= Northwestern League (1905–1917) =

Defunct minor league baseball league in the United States and Canada (1905–1917)

- Classification: Class B (1905–1917)
- Sport: Minor League Baseball
- First season: 1905
- Folded: 1917
- Replaced by: Pacific Coast International League
- President: William Henry Lucas (1905–1910); Robert Lindsay (1911); Dan Dugdale (1911); Fielder Jones (1912–1914); E.H. Hughes (1914); Bob Blewett (1915–1917)
- No. of teams: 21
- Country: United States of America
- Last champions: 4 Vancouver

The Northwestern League was a professional sports league in minor league baseball that operated from 1905 to 1917. It was represented by teams based in British Columbia, Montana, Oregon, and Washington. The league became the Pacific Coast International League in 1918.

== Teams ==
21 teams played in the league throughout its existence. Those teams include the: Aberdeen Black Cats (1905, 1917), Bellingham Gillnetters (1905), Everett Smokestackers (1905), Spokane Indians (1905–1917), Vancouver Horse Doctors (1905, 1907), Victoria Legislators (1905), Butte Miners (1906–1908, 1916–1917), Grays Harbor Lumbermen (1906), Tacoma Tigers (1906–1917), Seattle Siwashes (1907–1908), Grays Harbor Grays (1908–1909), Vancouver Beavers (1908–1911, 1914, 1916–1917), Portland Colts (1909, 1912–1914), Seattle Turks (1909), Seattle Giants (1910–1917), Portland Pippins (1911), Victoria Bees (1911–1915), Vancouver Champions (1912, 1915), Vancouver Bees (1913), Ballard Pippins (1914), a Great Falls, Montana team (1916) and Great Falls Electrics (1917).

== League champions ==
For most of the league's history, there were no official playoffs following the regular season. The only season with a playoff was 1915. Therefore, the team that finished in first place was often the de facto league champion.

The Everett Smokestackers were the league's first champions, finishing in first place in the four team league in 1905. In 1906, the Tacoma Tigers finished in first place, and in 1907, the Aberdeen Black Cats took the crown. The Vancouver Beavers finished in first place in 1908 and again in 1911 and 1914. The Seattle Turks won in 1909 and the Spokane Indians in 1910. In 1912, the Seattle Giants were first, while in 1913 the Vancouver Bees finished on top.

In 1915, the league played its only official playoff, which matched the first-place Seattle Giants against the second-place Tacoma Tigers. The Giants won the playoff three games to two, though it was presumably supposed to be at least a seven-game series - however, the playoff was abandoned during game six when a dispute broke out.

The Spokane Indians finished in first place in 1916 and the Great Falls Electrics finished in first place in 1917.

== Cities represented ==
- Aberdeen, WA: Aberdeen Black Cats 1907, 1915; Aberdeen Grays 1908–1909
- Aberdeen, WA & Hoquiam, WA: Grays Harbor Grays 1906
- Ballard, WA: Ballard Pippins 1914
- Bellingham, WA: Bellingham Yankees 1905
- Butte, MT: Butte Miners 1906–1908, 1916–1917
- Everett, WA: Everett Smokestackers 1905
- Great Falls, MT: Great Falls Electrics 1916–1917
- Portland, OR: Portland Colts 1909, 1912–1914; Portland Pippins 1911
- Seattle, WA: Seattle Siwashes 1907–1908; Seattle Turks 1909; Seattle Giants 1910–1917
- Spokane, WA: Spokane Indians 1905–1917
- Tacoma, WA: Tacoma Tigers 1906–1917
- Vancouver, BC: Vancouver Horse Doctors 1905, 1907; Vancouver Beavers 1908–1911, 1914, 1916–1917; Vancouver Champions 1912, 1915; Vancouver Bees 1913;
- Victoria, BC: Victoria Legislators 1905; Victoria Bees 1911–1915

== Standings & statistics ==
=== 1905 Northwestern League ===
schedule pt 1 - pt 2

Team standings	W	L	PCT	GB	Managers
Everett Smokestackers	60	37	.619	–	Billy Hulen
Bellingham Yankees	49	48	.505	11	Kirby Drennen / Frederick Clarke
Vancouver Horse Doctors	45	52	.464	15	John McCloskey
Victoria Legislators / Spokane Indians	41	58	.414	20	G.G. Howlett / Ed Hutchinson / Charles McIntyre

Victoria (14–38) moved to Spokane July 11.
Season shortened to September 11.
Playoffs: None. First half finished in a tie. League decided if Everett won second half, Everett would be champion. Everett won the second half.

Player statistics
Player	Team	Stat	Tot	Player	Team	Stat	Tot
Kirby Drennan	Bellingham	BA	.320	Carl Druhot	Bellingham	W	18
Billy Hulen	Everett	Runs	85	Hick Belt	Everett	W	18
Ed Hutchinson	Vict/Spoke	Hits	107	Ira Harmon	Vancouver	SO	194
Joe Marshall	Vancouver	HR	7	John McInnis	Everett	Pct	.800; 12–3

=== 1906 Northwestern League ===
schedule

Team standings	W	L	PCT	GB	Managers
Tacoma Tigers	54	36	.600	–	Mike Lynch
Butte Miners	43	42	.506	8.5	Charles McIntyre
Grays Harbor Grays	41	47	.466	12	Robert Brown / Bill Hurley
Spokane Indians	37	50	.425	15½	Bill Hurley / Matthew Stanley

Player statistics
Player	Team	Stat	Tot	Player	Team	Stat	Tot
Mike Lynch	Tacoma	BA	.355	Ike Butler	Tacoma	W	20
Mike Lynch	Tacoma	Runs	76	Irv Higginbotham	Tacoma	SO	153
Mike Lynch	Tacoma	Hits	130	Oscar Bandelin	Butte	Pct	.733; 11–4
Mike Lynch	Tacoma	HR	7				

=== 1907 Northwestern League ===
schedule

Team standings	W	L	PCT	GB	Managers
Aberdeen Black Cats	85	51	.625	–	Robert Brown
Tacoma Tigers	90	59	.604	1½	George Shreeder
Seattle Siwashes	83	65	.561	8	Dan Dugdale
Butte Miners	70	73	.490	18½	Russ Hall
Spokane Indians	68	76	.472	21	E.E. Quinn
Vancouver Horse Doctors	34	106	.243	53	Parke Wilson / Butch McIntyre / James Evans / Con Strothers / William Hurley

Player statistics
Player	Team	Stat	Tot	Player	Team	Stat	Tot
Ed Householder	Aberdeen	BA	.347	Ike Butler	Tacoma	W	32
Hunky Shaw	Tacoma	Runs	105	Irv Higginbotham	Aberdeen	SO	295
Hunky Shaw	Tacoma	Hits	174	Bill Brinker	Aberdeen	Pct	.714; 15-6
John Clynes	Tacoma/Vancouver	HR	10				

=== 1908 Northwestern League ===
schedule

Team standings	W	L	PCT	GB	Managers
Vancouver Beavers	85	62	.578	–	Richard Dickson
Tacoma Tigers	74	66	.529	7½	Mike Lynch
Aberdeen Grays	73	69	.514	9½	Robert Brown
Spokane Indians	72	75	.490	13	E.E. Quinn
Butte Miners	63	73	.463	16½	Russ Hall
Seattle Siwashes	65	87	.428	22½	Dan Dugdale

Player statistics
Player	Team	Stat	Tot	Player	Team	Stat	Tot
Steamer Flanagan	Vancouver	BA	.352	George Engel	Vancouver	W	22
Ham Hyatt	Vancouver	Runs	102	Ed Erickson	Vancouver	W	22
Ham Hyatt	Vancouver	Hits	185	Spec Harkness	Butte	W	22
Ham Hyatt	Vancouver	HR	15	Gus Thompson	Grays Harbor	SO	263
				George Engel	Vancouver	Pct	.733; 22-8

=== 1909 Northwestern League ===
schedule

Team standings	W	L	PCT	GB	Managers
Seattle Turks	109	58	.653	–	Mike Lynch
Spokane Indians	100	66	.602	8½	Robert Brown
Aberdeen Grays	78	81	.491	27	Pants Rowland
Portland Colts	79	88	.473	30	Perle Casey
Vancouver Beavers	70	96	.422	38½	Lou Nordyke
Tacoma Tigers	64	111	.366	49	Russ Hall / Jerry Hurley / Ike Butler

Player statistics
Player	Team	Stat	Tot	Player	Team	Stat	Tot
Pug Bennett	Seattle	BA	.314	Gus Thompson	Seattle	W	26
Pug Bennett	Seattle	Runs	111	Jesse Baker	Tacoma/Spokane	SO	249
Pug Bennett	Seattle	Hits	201	Frank Allen	Seattle	Pct	.769; 20-6
George Capron	Seattle	HR	15				

=== 1910 Northwestern League ===
schedule

Team standings	W	L	PCT	GB	Managers
Spokane Indians	96	65	.596	–	Harry Ostdiek
Vancouver Beavers	89	71	.556	6½	Robert Brown
Tacoma Tigers	73	84	.465	21	Cliff Blankenship
Seattle Giants	61	99	.381	34½	Mike Lynch / Fred Wood

Player statistics
Player	Team	Stat	Tot	Player	Team	Stat	Tot
Lou Nordyke	Spokane	BA	.290	Jesse Baker	Spokane	W	28
Charles Swain	Vancouver	Runs	88	Jesse Baker	Spokane	SO	227
Lou Nordyke	Spokane	Hits	163	Jesse Baker	Spokane	Pct	.737; 28-10
Charles Swain	Vancouver	HR	11				

=== 1911 Northwestern League ===
schedule

Team standings	W	L	PCT	GB	Managers
Vancouver Beavers	103	61	.628	–	Kitty Brashear
Spokane Indians	96	71	.574	8½	Harry Ostdiek
Seattle Giants	90	77	.533	14½	Jack Tighe / Frank Raymond
Portland Pippins	84	77	.521	17½	Nick Williams
Tacoma Tigers	81	84	.490	22½	Mike Lynch
Victoria Bees	41	125	.247	63	T.S. McPherson

Player statistics
Player	Team	Stat	Tot	Player	Team	Stat	Tot
Art Bues	Seattle	BA	.352	Ralph Willis	Spokane	W	23
Phil Cooney	Spokane	Runs	130	George Engel	Vancouver	Pct	.786; 22-6
Art Bues	Seattle	Hits	219				
Art Bues	Seattle	HR	27				
Pug Bennett	Vancouver	SB	64				

=== 1912 Northwestern League ===
schedule

Team Standings	W	L	PCT	GB	Managers
Seattle Giants	99	66	.600	–	Jack Barry / Frank Raymond
Spokane Indians	95	72	.568	5	Harry Ostdiek
Vancouver Champions	94	73	.563	6	Kitty Brashear
Portland Colts	74	88	.457	23½	Nick Williams
Victoria Bees	72	93	.436	27	Lou Nordyke
Tacoma Tigers	62	104	.373	37½	Mike Lynch

Player statistics
Player	Team	Stat	Tot	Player	Team	Stat	Tot
Jack Meek	Victoria	BA	.344	Bill James	Seattle	W	26
Hap Myers	Spokane	Runs	121	Bill James	Seattle	SO	201
Hap Myers	Spokane	Hits	207	Bill James	Seattle	Pct	.765; 26-8
Les Mann	Seattle	HR	23				
Hap Myers	Spokane	SB	116				

=== 1913 Northwestern League ===
schedule

Team standings	W	L	PCT	GB	Managers
Vancouver Bees	99	66	.600	–	Robert Brown
Portland Colts	86	73	.541	10	Nick Williams
Seattle Giants	89	78	.533	11	Frank Raymond
Victoria Bees	81	90	.474	21	Mike Lynch / Del Delmas
Tacoma Tigers	75	96	.439	27	Joe McGinnity
Spokane Indians	70	97	.419	30	Harry Ostdiek / Watt Powell / Mike Lynch

Player statistics
Player	Team	Stat	Tot	Player	Team	Stat	Tot
Jack Meek	Victoria	BA	.358	Erv Kantlehner	Victoria	W	23
Charles Swain	Victoria	Runs	112	Erv Kantlehner	Victoria	SO	253
Ed Kippert	Vancouver	Hits	202	Clyde Hall	Vancouver	Pct	.696; 16-7
Charles Swain	Victoria	HR	34				

=== 1914 Northwestern League ===
schedule

Team standings	W	L	PCT	GB	Managers
Vancouver Beavers	96	56	.632	–	Robert Brown
Seattle Giants	95	61	.609	3	Frank Raymond
Spokane Indians	84	68	.553	12	Mike Lynch
Victoria Bees	64	87	.424	31½	Del Delmas
Tacoma Tigers	64	93	.408	34½	Joe McGinnity / Russ Hall
Portland Colts / Ballard Pippins	58	96	.377	39	Nick Williams

Portland (36–60) moved to Ballard July 20.

Player statistics
Player	Team	Stat	Tot	Player	Team	Stat	Tot
Emil Frisk	Vancou/Spokane	BA	.322	Wheezer Dell	Seattle	W	21
Kid Butler	Spokane	Runs	95	Stan Coveleski	Spokane	SO	214
Emil Frisk	Vancou/Spokane	Hits	178	Oscar Harstad	Vancouver	Pct	.867; 13-2
Charles Swain	Seattle	HR	12				

=== 1915 Northwestern League ===
schedule

Team standings	W	L	PCT	GB	Managers
Seattle Giants	88	68	.564	–	Frank Raymond
Tacoma Tigers	86	72	.544	3	Russ Hall / Joe McGinnity
Spokane Indians	81	74	.523	6½	Bob Wicker
Vancouver Champions	74	79	.484	12½	Hank Scharnweber
Aberdeen Black Cats #	46	62	.426	NA	Charley Stis / Pug Bennett
Victoria Bees	41	61	.402	NA	Martin Nye

Victoria and Aberdeen folded August 1.
Playoff: Seattle 3 games, Tacoma 2; abandoned after sixth game ended in dispute.

Player statistics
Player	Team	Stat	Tot	Player	Team	Stat	Tot
Ed Kippert	Sea/Aber/Tacoma	BA	.332	Richard Kaufman	Tacoma	W	25
Jack Smith	Aberdeen/Seattle	Runs	99	Duster Mails	Seattle	SO	250
Ted Kaylor	Spokane/Victoria	Hits	197	Chuck Rose	Seattle	Pct	.667; 20-10
Bill Brinker	Vancouver	HR	11				

=== 1916 Northwestern League ===
schedule

Team standings	W	L	PCT	GB	Managers
Spokane Indians	79	48	.622	–	Nick Williams
Butte Miners	68	59	.535	11	Joe McGinnity
Tacoma Tigers	63	61	.508	14½	Russ Hall
Great Falls Electrics	60	61	.496	16	Dick Hurley / Herb Hester
Seattle Giants	60	72	.455	21½	Frank Raymond
Vancouver Beavers	50	79	.388	30	Robert Brown

Player statistics
Player	Team	Stat	Tot	Player	Team	Stat	Tot
Ed Kippert	Butte	BA	.358	Suds Sutherland	Tacoma	W	23
Roy Grover	Butte	Runs	119	Rudy Kallio	Great Falls	SO	190
Rod Murphy	Vancouver	Hits	182	Suds Sutherland	Tacoma	Pct	.767; 23-7
Dave Hillyard	Butte	HR	17				
Dave Hillyard	Butte	RBI	101				

=== 1917 Northwestern League ===
schedule

Team standings	W	L	PCT	GB	Managers
Great Falls Electrics	42	29	.592	–	Herb Hester
Seattle Giants	46	34	.575	½	Bill Leard / Rube Gardner
Tacoma Tigers	38	35	.521	5	Frank Raymond
Spokane Indians	36	41	.468	9	Nick Williams
Butte Miners	31	38	.449	10	Joe McGinnity / Cliff McCarl
Vancouver Beavers	33	49	.402	14½	Robert Brown

Season was shortened to July 15 with National Association approval.

Player statistics
Player	Team	Stat	Tot	Player	Team	Stat	Tot
Harry Harper	Tacoma	BA	.382	Herman Pillette	Tacoma	W	13
Charles Jackson	Spokane	Runs	74	Jim Clark	Great Falls	W	13
Harry Harper	Tacoma	Hits	113	Harry Gardner	Great Falls/Tacoma	SO	108
Dave Hillyard	Butte	HR	12	Pat Eastley	Seattle	Pct	.750; 9–3

== Baseball Hall of Fame alumni ==
- Dave Bancroft, 1913 Portland Colts
- Stan Coveleski, 1913–1914 Spokane Indians
- Harry Heilmann, 1913 Portland Colts
- George Kelly, 1914–1915 Victoria Bees
- Joe McGinnity, 1913–1915 Tacoma Tigers, 1916–1917 Butte Miners, 1917 Great Falls Electrics
