= List of professional sports teams in British Columbia =

British Columbia is the third-most populated province in Canada and has a rich history of professional sports. Most professional sports teams in the province reside in the major metropolitan areas of Vancouver.

== Active teams ==
Vancouver has professional teams in four sports: ice hockey, baseball, football and football.

=== Major league teams ===
British Columbia is home to three major professional sports teams. All of the teams play in Vancouver.

Canadian football
League	Team	City	Stadium	Capacity
CFL	BC Lions	Vancouver	BC Place	54,500
Ice hockey
League	Team	City	Arena	Capacity
NHL	Vancouver Canucks	Vancouver	Rogers Arena	18,871
Soccer
League	Team	City	Stadium	Capacity
MLS	Vancouver Whitecaps FC	Vancouver	BC Place	54,500

=== Other professional sports teams ===
==== Men's leagues ====
Baseball
League	Team	City	Stadium	Capacity
NWL (A)	Vancouver Canadians	Vancouver	Nat Bailey Stadium	6,500
Basketball
League	Team	City	Arena	Capacity
CEBL	Vancouver Bandits	Langley	Langley Events Centre	5,276
Ice hockey
League	Team	City	Arena	Capacity
AHL	Abbotsford Canucks	Abbotsford	Rogers Forum	7,000
Soccer
League	Team	City	Stadium	Capacity
MLSNP	Whitecaps FC 2	Burnaby	Swangard Stadium	5,288
CPL	Vancouver FC	Langley	Willoughby Community Park	6,600
CPL	Pacific FC	Langford	Starlight Stadium	6,000
Lacrosse
League	Team	City	Stadium	Capacity
NLL	Vancouver Warriors	Vancouver	Rogers Arena	18,910

==== Women's leagues ====
Ice hockey
League	Team	City	Arena	Capacity
PWHL	Vancouver Goldeneyes	Vancouver	Pacific Coliseum	16,281
Soccer
League	Team	City	Stadium	Capacity
NSL	Vancouver Rise FC	Burnaby	Swangard Stadium	5,288

=== Map of cities with a professional sports team ===
Location with a professional sports team

== Former teams ==
=== Major league teams ===
Basketball
League	Team	City	Years
NBA	Vancouver Grizzlies	Vancouver	1995-2001
Canadian football
League	Team	City	Years
WIFU	Vancouver Grizzlies	Vancouver	1941
Ice hockey
League	Team	City	Years
PCHA	New Westminster Royals	New Westminster	1911-1914
PCHA	Vancouver Millionaires	Vancouver	1911-1922
PCHA	Vancouver Maroons	Vancouver	1922-1924
PCHA	Victoria Aristocrats	Victoria	1911-1916; 1918-1923
PCHA	Victoria Cougars	Victoria	1923-1924
WCHL	Vancouver Maroons	Vancouver	1924-1926
WCHL	Victoria Cougars	Victoria	1924-1926
WHA	Vancouver Blazers	Vancouver	1973-1975

=== Other former professional sports teams ===
Baseball
League	Team	City	Years
PCL (AAA)	Vancouver Mounties	Vancouver	1956-1962; 1965-1969
PCL (AAA)	Vancouver Canadians	Vancouver	1978-1999
WIL (A/B/Ind.)	Vancouver Beavers	Vancouver	1922
WIL (A/B/Ind.)	Vancouver Maple Leafs	Vancouver	1937-1938
WIL (A/B/Ind.)	Vancouver Capilanos	Vancouver	1939-1942; 1946-1954
WIL (A/B/Ind.)	Victoria Athletics	Victoria	1946-1951
WIL (A/B/Ind.)	Victoria Tyees	Victoria	1952-1954
NWL (A)	New Westminster Frasers	New Westminster	1974
NWL (A)	Victoria Mussels	Victoria	1978-1979
NWL (A)	Victoria Blues	Victoria	1980
NoWL (B)	Vancouver Horse Doctors	Vancouver	1905; 1907
NoWL (B)	Vancouver Beavers	Vancouver	1908-1911; 1914; 1916-1917
NoWL (B)	Vancouver Champions	Vancouver	1912; 1915
NoWL (B)	Vancouver Bees	Vancouver	1913
NoWL (B)	Victoria Legislators	Victoria	1905
NoWL (B)	Victoria Bees	Victoria	1911-1915
PC-IL (B)	Vancouver Beavers	Vancouver	1918; 1920-1921
PC-IL (B)	Victoria Islanders	Victoria	1920
PC-IL (B)	Victoria Bees	Victoria	1921
NW-IL (B)	Vancouver Beavers	Vancouver	1919
NW-IL (B)	Victoria Tyees	Victoria	1919
PNWL (Ind.)	Victoria Chappies	Victoria	1896
CBL (Ind.)	Kelowna Heat	Kelowna	2003
CBL (Ind.)	Victoria Capitals	Victoria	2003
Basketball
League	Team	City	Years
WBL	Vancouver Nighthawks	Vancouver	1988
Cricket
League	Team	City	Years
GT20	Surrey Jaguars	Surrey	2023-2024
GT20	Vancouver Knights	Vancouver	2018-2024
Ice hockey
League	Team	City	Years
AHL	Abbotsford Heat	Abbotsford	2009-2014
ECHL	Victoria Salmon Kings	Victoria	2004-2011
PCHL	New Westminster Royals	New Westminster	1945-1952
PCHL	Vancouver Lions	Vancouver	1928-1931; 1936-1941
PCHL	Vancouver Canucks	Vancouver	1945-1952
PCHL	Victoria Cubs	Victoria	1928-1930
PCHL	Victoria Cougars	Victoria	1949-1952
NWHL	Vancouver Lions	Vancouver	1933-1936
WHL	New Westminster Royals	New Westminster	1952-1959
WHL	Vancouver Canucks	Vancouver	1952-1970
WHL	Victoria Cougars	Victoria	1952-1961
WHL	Victoria Maple Leafs	Victoria	1964-1967
WWHL	British Columbia Breakers	Langley	2004-2009
Inline hockey
League	Team	City	Years
RHI	Vancouver Voodoo	Vancouver	1993-1996
Lacrosse
League	Team	City	Years
NLL	Vancouver Ravens	Vancouver	2002-2004
Soccer
League	Team	City	Years
NPSL	Vancouver Royals	Vancouver	1968
NPSL	Vancouver Whitecaps	Vancouver	1974-1984
USA	Vancouver Royal Canadians	Vancouver	1967
APSL	Vancouver 86ers	Vancouver	1993-1994
A-League	Vancouver 86ers	Vancouver	1995-2000
A-League	Vancouver Whitecaps	Vancouver	2001-2004
USL-1	Vancouver Whitecaps	Vancouver	2005-2010
USLC	Whitecaps FC 2	Vancouver	2015-2017
CSL	Vancouver 86ers	Vancouver	1987-1992
CSL	Victoria Vistas	Victoria	1989-1990
W-League	Vancouver Breakers	Burnaby	2001-2002
W-League	Vancouver Whitecaps Women	Burnaby	2003-2012
W-League	Victoria Highlanders Women	Victoria	2011-2012

== See also ==
- Professional sports in Canada
- List of professional sports teams in Canada by city
