= List of baseball parks in Vancouver =

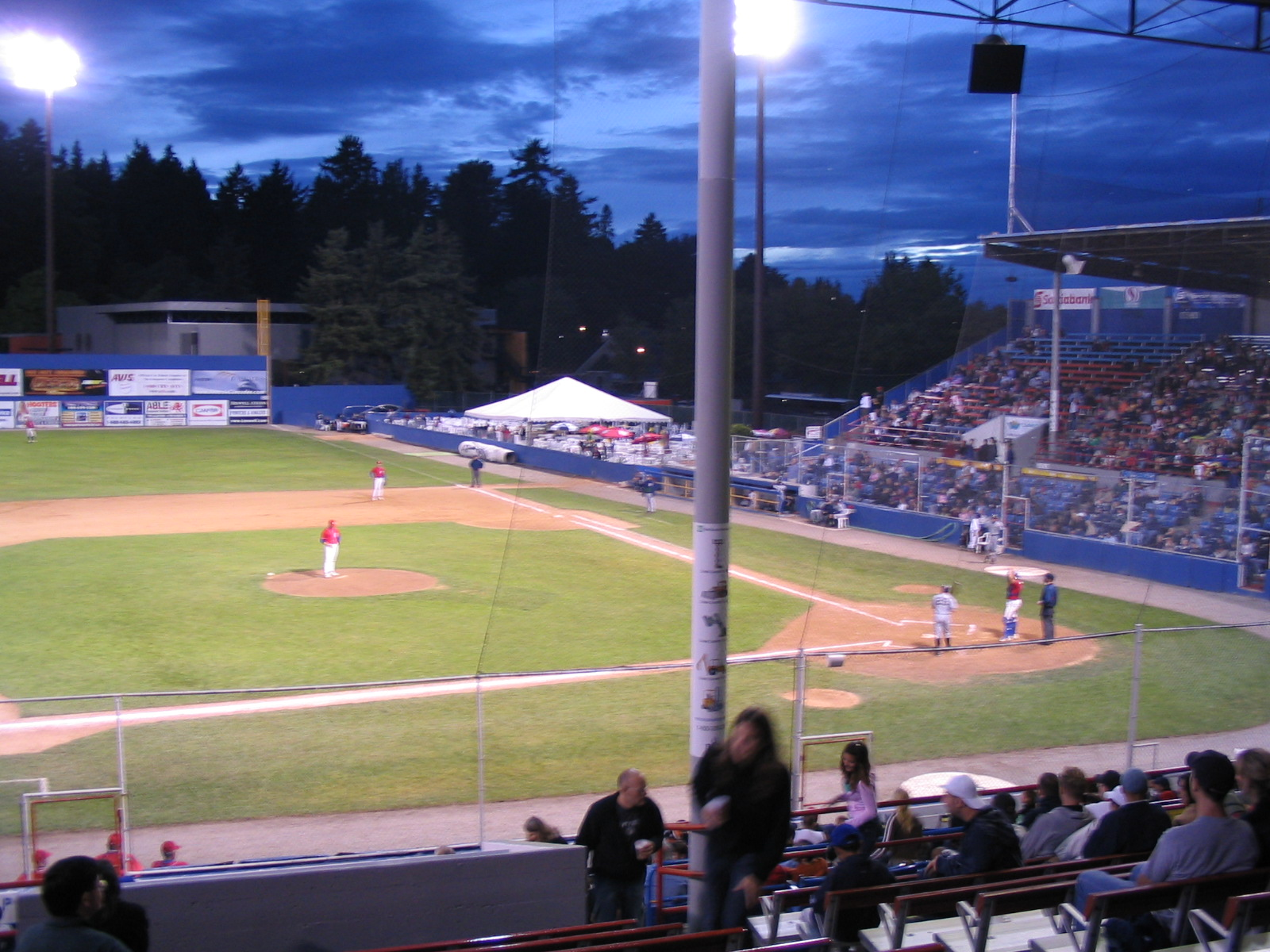
Nat Bailey Stadium

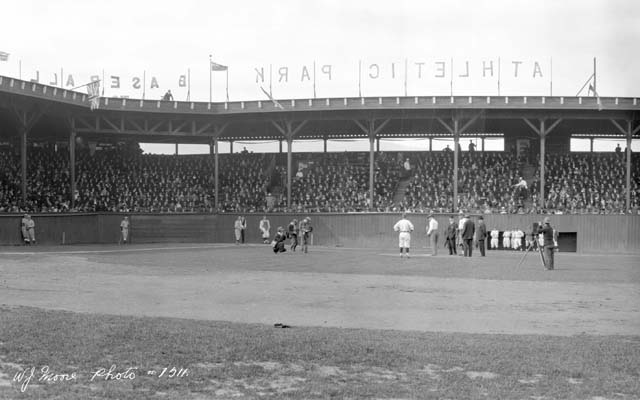
Athletic Park

This is a list of venues used for professional baseball in Vancouver, British Columbia, Canada.

== List ==
Venue	Location	Home of	Status
Athletic Park (renamed Sick's Capilano Stadium)	Hemlock Street (west, first base); 6th Avenue (south, right field); Birch Street (east, left field); railroad tracks (northeast); 5th Avenue imaginary line (north, third base)	Vancouver Beavers: NWL / Pacific Coast International League (1913–1919); PCIL (1920–1922); Western International League (1939–1950)	Closed (currently commercial and residential)
BC Place	North side of False Creek		
Nat Bailey Stadium (formerly Capilano Stadium)	4601 Ontario Street (east, third base); Midlothian Street (southwest, center field); Hillcrest Park and DinMont Avenue (northwest, first base)	Vancouver Mounties: Pacific Coast League (1956–1962); PCL (1965–1969); Vancouver Canadians: PCL (1978–1999); Northwest League (2000–2020, 2022–present)	
Oppenheimer Park	Japantown (Paueru-Gai) in Downtown Eastside	Asahi baseball team (prior to World War II)	
Recreation Park	Homer Street (northwest, first base); Smithe Street (northeast, third base); Hamilton / Mainland Street (southeast, left field); Nelson / Cambie Street (southwest, right field)	Vancouver Beavers – Northwestern League (1905–1912)	Closed (currently office buildings and the small Yaletown Park)

== See also ==
- Lists of baseball parks
