= Seattle Turks =

Minor league baseball team (1909)

The Seattle Turks were a minor league baseball team based in Seattle, Washington that played in the 1909 Northwestern League season. In their only year with the Turks name, the team won the league title with a record of 109–58.

The team was owned by Dan Dugdale, who previously called his Seattle teams the Clamdiggers and Siwashes. In 1910, a fan contest led the team to be renamed the Seattle Giants. The team played at Yesler Way Park, built by Dugdale.

The team's offense was led by Pug Bennett and Emil Frisk, who both hit over .300. Pitcher Gus Thompson had 26 wins and Frank Allen had 20 wins. The team had six players who played in major leagues: Bennett, Frisk, Thompson, Lee Magee, Bert Whaling, and Mike Lynch, who was also the team's manager.

On June 29, 2013, the Seattle Mariners team wore Seattle Turks throwback uniforms in a game against the Chicago Cubs. The Mariners' home field was renamed Yesler Way Park for the game.
