= Baseball in Vancouver =

Professional baseball has been played in Vancouver, British Columbia, since 1905. The city currently has Minor League Baseball's (MiLB) only Canadian franchise, the Vancouver Canadians. The city has had many amateur, semi-professional, and university teams as well.

== Veterans, Canucks, and Beavers (1905–1922) ==
Recreation Park was the first venue in the city for professional baseball. Constructed by a group of local businessmen between Smithe, Nelson, Homer, and Hamilton streets, its grand opening was on May 11, 1905, and was designated as a civic holiday. Its first home team was the Vancouver Veterans, managed by John McCloskey, and a member of the Northwestern League, a Class B league. The Veterans played in 1905, sat out the 1906 season due to financial problems, and returned in 1907 as the Canucks. The team was renamed the Beavers in 1908, and continued to play until 1922, moving to Athletic Park in 1913. Recreation Park was dismantled due to Vancouver's real estate boom that began in 1909, which led its owners to sell the appreciated land off in smaller parcels for development.

== Asahi (1914–1941) ==
The Asahi team was a Japanese–Canadian team that played in multiple leagues, between 1914 and 1941, at the Powell Street Grounds, in Japantown. The team won titles in 1919, 1926, 1930, 1933, and from 1937 to 1941. It disbanded after the attack on Pearl Harbor, due to Japanese internment.

== Western International League (1922, 1937–1954) ==
The Vancouver Beavers played one season in the Western International League, in 1922, before the WIL ceased operations. When the WIL reformed in 1937, Vancouver fielded two teams in it: the Vancouver Maple Leafs in 1937 and 1938, and the Vancouver Capilanos from 1939 to 1942, and from 1946 to 1954. The Capilanos won four WIL pennants, in 1942, 1947, 1949, and 1954.

== UBC Thunderbirds (1950s–1966, 1996–present) ==
The University of British Columbia's (UBC) Thunderbirds baseball team played from the 1950s until, due to budget cuts, the team was disbanded in 1966. The team was re-formed in 1996. The team is the only Canadian member of the National Association of Intercollegiate Athletics (NAIA), and has qualified for the NAIA World Series tournament in 2006 and 2025.

== Pacific Coast League (1956–1969, 1978–1999) ==
Even though the Capilanos were the final champions of the WIL, Vancouver was not part of its reformation into the Northwest League (NWL), due to the NWL's shedding of all of its Canadian teams in order to focus on the American Pacific Northwest. Vancouver was without professional baseball in 1955, but in 1956, the highest calibre of minor league play, in the form of the Open classification Pacific Coast League, came to British Columbia, when the Oakland Oaks transferred there as the Vancouver Mounties. The Mounties played in the PCL from 1956 through 1962, and from 1965 through 1969.

The Vancouver Canadians of the Pacific Coast League played at Nat Bailey Stadium from 1978 to 1999. Initially a Triple-A affiliate of the Oakland Athletics, the Canadians later affiliated with the Milwaukee Brewers from 1979 to 1986, the Pittsburgh Pirates in 1987, the Chicago White Sox from 1988 to 1992, the California/Anaheim Angels from 1993 to 1998, and the Athletics again in 1999. Just days after winning the 1999 Triple-A World Series, owner Art Savage moved the team to Sacramento, where it was renamed to the Sacramento River Cats for the 2000 season.

== Northwest League (2000–present) ==
The Southern Oregon Timberjacks relocated in 1999 to become the new Vancouver Canadians, and the renamed team began play at Nat Bailey Stadium in 2000, in the Northwest League, then a Class A Short Season league. Since 2021, the Northwest League is part of High-A baseball. The Northwest League Canadians were affiliated with the Athletics from 2000 to 2010, and since 2011 have been an affiliate of the Toronto Blue Jays.

== Potential Major League Baseball expansion team ==
With the construction of the domed, multipurpose BC Place stadium beginning in 1981 as part of Vancouver's hosting preparations for Expo 86, Jim Pattison, owner of the PCL Canadians, had begun aggressively pursuing a Major League Baseball (MLB) expansion team or a relocation candidate to play in BC Place. The Seattle Mariners had reportedly considered playing up to 15 games a year in Vancouver amid struggling attendance, but this ultimately never materialized. BC Place has hosted multiple MLB exhibition games, with the most recent being a series between the Toronto Blue Jays, Montreal Expos, Seattle Mariners, and Colorado Rockies in April 1994.

Vancouver has been mentioned as a potential expansion city by MLB commissioner Rob Manfred, as well as various journalistic insiders, on multiple occasions, as recently as May 2026.
