= Ballard Pippins =

- 1914; Ballard, Washington

Minor league affiliations
- Class: Class B (1914)
- League: Northwestern League (1914)

Major league affiliations
- Team: None

Minor league titles
- League titles (0): None

Team data
- Name: Ballard Pippins (1914)
- Ballpark: Dugdale Field (1914)

The Ballard Pippins were a minor league baseball team based in Ballard, Washington. In 1914, the Pippins played a partial season as members of the Class B level Northwestern League in their only season of play.

The Ballard Pippins hosted their minor league home games at Dugdale Field.

== History ==
Minor league baseball began in the Ballard, Washington neighborhood of Seattle, Washington in 1914. The Ballard "Pippins" became members of the six–team Class B level Northwestern League when the Portland franchise relocated during the season. The Seattle Giants, Spokane Indians, Tacoma Tigers, Vancouver Beavers and Victoria Bees joined Ballard in 1914 league play after the move.

During the 1914 season, Portland Colts owner William W. McCredie reportedly sold the Colts to timber mogul Quinn Farr, who relocated the franchise to the Ballard, Seattle, Washington neighborhood, his hometown. McCredie claimed the Portland franchise was going to be revoked for the 1915 season because travel expenses to the city were too high. The move gave Seattle two local minor league franchises in 1914.

The Ballard use of the "Pippins" moniker corresponds with local agriculture in the region. By definition, a "pippin" refers to varieties of apples.

On July 20, 1914, the Portland Colts Northwestern League franchise relocated to Ballard, Washington with a record of 36–60. After compiling a 22–36 record while based in Ballard, the Colts/Pippins team finished last in the final six–team Northwestern League final standings. The Pippins placed sixth in the final standings with an overall record of 58–96, finishing 39.0 games behind the first place Vancouver Beavers. Nick Williams was the team manager in both locations. In the final league standings, Vancouver (96–56), Seattle Giants (95–61), Spokane Indians (84–68), Victoria Bees (64–87) and Tacoma Tigers (64–93) finished ahead of Ballard.

The Ballard Pippins franchise folded following the 1914 season, replaced in the six–team 1915 Northwestern League by the Aberdeen Black Cats.

Ballard has not hosted another minor league baseball team since the Pippins folded. The once independent city was annexed by Seattle in 1907. As of 2026, it hosts two amateur soccer teams, Ballard FC and Salmon Bay FC.

== The ballpark ==
The Ballard Pippins reportedly played 1914 minor league home games at the "Ballard Base Ball Field"/Dugdale Field. The ballpark was reportedly located at Rainier Avenue & McClellan Street and was the future site of Sick's Stadium, eventual home of the major league Seattle Pilots.

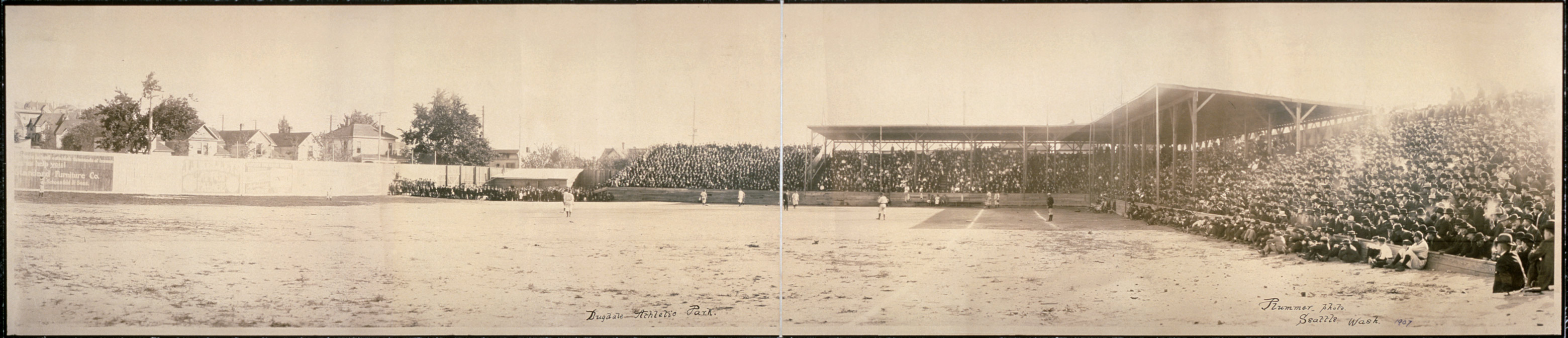
(1907) Dugdale Field. Seattle, Washington.

== Year-by-year records ==
Year	Record	Finish	Manager	Playoffs/Notes
1911	58–96	6th	Nick Williams	Portland (36–60) moved to Ballard July 20

== Notable alumni ==
- Ray Callahan (1914)
- Oscar Jones (1914)
- Howie Haworth (1914)
- Elmer Leonard (1914)
- Bill McCorry (1914)
- Milo Netzel (1914)
- Buck Stanley (1914)

== See also ==
- Ballard Pippins players
- List of professional baseball stadiums in Seattle
