= 1904 Tacoma Tigers season =

1904 Tacoma Tigers
- League: Pacific Coast League
- Ballpark: Tacoma Baseball Park
- City: Tacoma, Washington
- Record: 130–94
- League place: 1st
- Owners: Mike Fisher
- Managers: Mike Fisher

The 1904 Tacoma Tigers season was the first season for the Tacoma Tigers baseball team after relocating from Sacramento, California. Playing in the Pacific Coast Conference (PCL), the Tigers compiled a 130–94 record and won the pennant.

The team had been the Sacramento Senators in 1903. Mike Fisher, sometimes spelled Mique Fisher, was the team's owner and manager. In December 1903, Fisher announced he was moving the team to Tacoma, Washington. Fisher said at the time that the team was unable to make money in Sacramento.

The 1904 PCL season was divided into two parts with a plan to have the leader in the first part play the leader in the second part in a championship series. Tacoma had the best record in the first part of the season. In a controversial decision, one of Tacoma's victories over Portland was disallowed, creating a tie with the Los Angeles Angels for the second part. The Angels and Tigers then met in a championship series in the first half of December 1904. In the 10-game series, Tacoma won five games, Los Angeles won four games, and one game ended in a tie with the game being called due to darkness at the end of the ninth inning. Because neither team won a majority of the ten games, the decision was put to PCL's directors to award the pennant. On December 15, 1904, the directors met in San Francisco and awarded the pennant to Tacoma.

== Pitchers ==
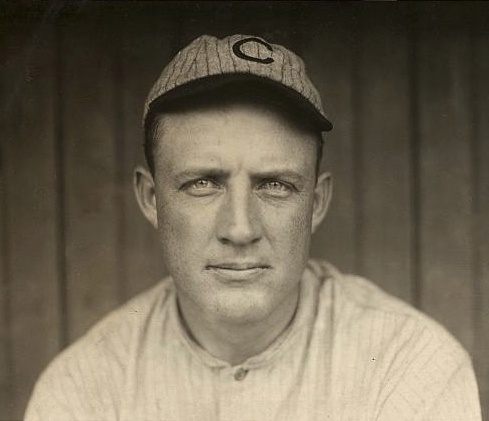
Orval Overall

Bobby Keefe, a native of Folsom, California, played for Sacramento in 1903 and followed as the team relocated to Tacoma. He appeared in 55 games in 1908 and compiled a 34–15 record with a 2.40 earned run average (ERA). He went on to play for the New York Yankees in 1907 and for the Cincinnati Reds in 1911 and 1912.

Orval Overall, a native of Farmersville, California, played his first season of professional baseball in 1904. He appeared in 61 games and compiled a 32–25 record with a 2.78 ERA.

Bill Thomas, a native of Florin, California, was also a member of the Sacramento club in 1903. In 1904, he appeared in 55 games for Tacoma, compiling a 27–24 record with a 2.87 ERA.

Jim St. Vrain, a Missouri native, spent a portion of the 1903 season with the Tacoma baseball team in the Pacific Northwest League. In 1904, he appeared in 38 games for Tacoma, compiling an 18–13 record with a 3.16 ERA.

== Infielders ==
The 1904 Tacoma team was led by an infield that included shortstop Truck Eagan. Eagan, a San Francisco native, played for Sacramento from 1901 to 1903. In 1904, he led the PCL with 24 home runs, nearly double the home run count of the runner up. He also led the team, and ranked third in the PCL, with a .311 batting average in 736 at bats. He also had 49 doubles, six triples, and a .492 slugging percentage.

The Tigers received strong support from three other infielders, each with at least 200 hits as follows:

- Third baseman Tommy Sheehan, a native of Sacramento, California, had played for Sacramento since 1900. In 1904, he appeared in 216 games, ranked third on the team with a .292 batting average, and led the team with 251 hits in 826 at bats.
- First baseman Lou Nordyke, an Iowa native, spent the 1903 season with the Spokane team in the Pacific Northwest League. In 1904, he placed second among Tacoma players with a .304 batting average and 227 hits in 744 at bats.
- Second baseman Pearl Casey, a Missouri native, played for Sacramento in 1902 and 1903. In 1904, he appeared in 213 games, compiled a .278 batting average and tallied 211 hits, including 32 doubles and seven triples.

Two players shared principal responsibility at the catcher position. Charlie Graham, a Sacramento native, had played for Sacramento in 1902 and 1903. In 1904, Graham appeared in 149 games and compiled a .246 average. Wallace Hogan, a native of Santa Clara, had played for Sacramento since 1901. In 1904, Hogan appeared in 127 games with a .206 batting average.

== Outfielders ==
Center fielder Mike Lynch, a Minnesota native, had played for the Tacoma team in the Pacific Northwest League in 1901 and 1903. He briefly played for the Chicago Orphans during the 1902 season. In 1904, he appeared in 219 games for Tacoma, led the club with 51 doubles, tallied 204 hits, and compiled a .254 batting average.

Left fielder George McLaughlin, a San Francisco native, had played for the Sacramento team since 1899. During the 1904 season, he appeared in 226 games, tallied 206 hits and six home runs, and compiled a .257 batting average and a .356 slugging percentage.

Right fielder Charles Doyle, a native of San Jose, California, had played for Sacramento since 1898. In 1904, he appeared in 181 games and had a .233 batting average.

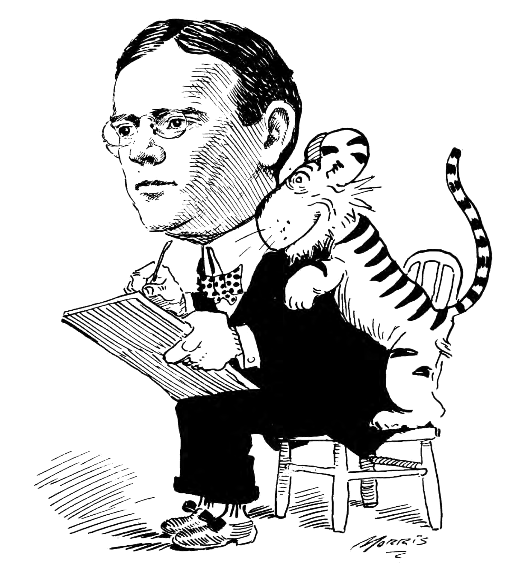
Cartoonist Edward S. "Tige" Reynolds cartoonist for the Tacoma Ledger with his tiger character, inspired by the home team.

== 1904 PCL standings ==
Team	W	L	Pct.	GB
Tacoma Tigers	130	94	.580	--
Los Angeles Angels	119	98	.548	7.5
Seattle Indians	115	105	.523	13.0
Oakland Oaks	115	110	.511	
San Francisco Stars	101	117	.463	
Portland Browns	80	136	.370	46.0

== Statistics ==
=== Batting ===
Note: Pos = Position; G = Games played; AB = At bats; H = Hits; Avg. = Batting average; HR = Home runs; SLG = Slugging percentage

Pos	Player	G	AB	H	Avg.	HR	SLG
SS	Truck Eagan	200	736	229	.311	24	.492
1B	Lou Nordyke	200	742	227	.306	3	.399
3B	Tommy Sheehan	216	825	241	.292	1	.375
2B	Pearl Casey	213	759	211	.278	1	.343
LF	George McLaughlin	226	803	206	.257	6	.356
CF	Mike Lynch	219	807	204	.253	5	.349
RF	Charles Doyle	181	774	180	.233	0	.274
C	Charlie Graham	149	488	120	.246	3	.307
C	Wallace Hogan	127	422	87	.206	0	.239

=== Pitching ===
Note: G = Games pitched; IP = Innings pitched; W = Wins; L = Losses; PCT = Win percentage; ERA = Earned run average; SO = Strikeouts

Player	G	IP	W	L	PCT	ERA	SO
Bobby Keefe	50	438.2	34	15	.694	2.40	
Orval Overall	61	510.2	32	25	.561	2.78	
Bill Thomas	55	422.2	27	24	.529	2.87	
Jim St. Vrain	38	302.0	18	13	.581	3.16	
Jack Fitzgerald	34	273.2	17	12	.586	3.26	
