= Yakima Indians (baseball) =

- 1920–1921; Yakima, Washington

Minor league affiliations
- Class: Class B (1920–1921)
- League: Pacific Coast International League (1920–1921)

Major league affiliations
- Team: None

Minor league titles
- League titles (1): 1921

Team data
- Name: Yakima Indians (1920–1921)
- Ballpark: Athletic Field (1920–1921)

The Yakima Indians were a minor league baseball team based in Yakima, Washington.

In 1920 and 1921, the "Indians" played as members of the Class B level Pacific Coast International League, winning the 1921 league championship.

The Yakima Indians hosted home minor league games at the Athletic Field, known today as Lions Park.

== History ==
The Yakima Indians were preceded in local minor league baseball play by the 1913 and 1914 North Yakima Braves, who played as charter members of the six–team Class D level Western Tri-State League. The league folded following the 1914 season, after not being able to raise funds to continue play. Western Tri-State League president Roy W. Ritner stated that the failure of the league to return to play was due to the North Yakama, and Walla Walla clubs not wanting to work together.

In 1920, the Yakima "Indians" resumed minor league play in Yakima, as the Indians became members of the six-team Class B Level Pacific Coast International League. The Pacific International Coast International League had evolved from the 1919 Northwest International League that played without a Yakima franchise.

The Yakima "Indians" nickname corresponds with local history and culture. The Yakama are a Native American tribe based in the region.

The Seattle Giants, Spokane Indians, Tacoma Tigers, Vancouver Beavers and Victoria Islanders teams joined Yakima in beginning league play on May 5, 1920.

In their first season of play in the Pacific Coast International League, Yakima placed second in the 1920 league standings. The Indians ended their 1920 season with a record of 65–48, playing the season under manager Frank "Tealy" Raymond. Yakima finished 3.0 games behind the first place Victoria Islanders in the six–team league.

Paul Strand of Yakima won the 1920 Pacific Coast International League batting title, hitting .339, while his Indians teammate Charles Gorman scored 101 runs to lead the league. James Harrigan of Yakima had 156 total hits, most in the league.

The Yakima Indians won the league championship in 1921, in the final season of play for the Pacific Coast International League, which reduced two teams to become a four-team league. Yakima won the league championship, finishing in first place with a final record of 79–36, playing the season under returning manager Teally Raymond. Yakima finished 16.5 games ahead the second place Tacoma Tigers, as the four–team league held no playoffs. The league had adopted a split-season format, but Yakima was in first place in both halves, negating a playoff series.

George Lafayette of Yakima hit .428 to capture the 1912 league batting title. Lafayette also led the Pacific Coast International League with 132 runs scored and 179 total hits. Yakima pitcher Guy Cooper won 22 games with 162 strikeouts to lead the league in both categories.

After compiling a two-season record of 144–84, Yakima was unable to defend their 1921 championship, when the Pacific Coast International League did not return to play in 1922. The Tacoma Tigers and Vancouver Beavers franchises became members of the 1922 Western International League, while the Yakima and Victoria Bees teams did not resume play.

Yakima next hosted minor league baseball sixteen years later, when the 1937 Yakima Pippins began a 14-year tenure as members of the Western International League.

== The ballpark ==
In 1920 and 1921, the Yakima Indians hosted home minor league home games at the Athletic Field. In the era, the site was bordered by 6th Avenue, West Pine Street & West Maple Street at South 6th Avenue & South 5th Avenue. The site is still in use today as a public park, known as Lions Park. The park is adjacent to A.C. Davis High School (Washington), which was first constructed in 1905 and is located at 202 South 6th Avenue. Lions Park is located at 509 West Pine Street in Yakima, Washington.

== Timeline ==
Year(s)	# Yrs.	Team	Level	League	Ballpark
1920–1921	1	Yakima Indians	Class D	Pacific Coast International League	Athletic Field

== Year–by–year records ==
Year	Record	Finish	Manager	Playoffs/Notes
1920	65–48	2nd	Teally Raymond	No playoffs held
1921	79–36	1st	Teally Raymond	League champions

== Notable alumni ==
- Charlie Barnabe (1920)
- Guy Cooper (1921)
- Carter Elliott (1921)
- Hugh McMullen (1920)
- Paul Strand (1920)

== See also ==
- Yakima Indians players
