= Portland Colts =

- 1909–1914; (1909, 1911, 1912, 1913, 1914); Portland, Oregon

Minor league affiliations
- Previous classes: Class B
- League: Portland Beavers (unofficial) (1909, 1911–14); Northwestern League (1909, 1911–14)

Major league affiliations
- Previous teams: Cleveland Indians (unofficial) (1911–14)

Minor league titles
- League titles: None

Team data
- Previous parks: Vaughn Street Park (1909, 1911–14); McKenna Park (hosted exhibition games in 1911)

The Portland Colts were a minor league baseball team based in Portland, Oregon for five seasons (1909, 1911–14) in the Class B Northwestern League. The Colts served as an unofficial farm team for the Portland Beavers and the Cleveland Indians. The Colts and Beavers shared Vaughn Street Park. The franchise was established in 1909 by William Wallace McCredie, who was the owner of the Beavers and a sitting Congressman. The team was disbanded after their first season, with McCredie selling several players to the Beavers. McCredie originally said he did not want to run two teams, but changed his mind in 1911 when he placed a bid for a Northwestern League franchise. The league penalized McCredie with a US$1,000 re-entry fee and adopted new rules when it came to selling players from your team.

In 1911, the Portland team was not officially named, but the "Colts" nickname returned at the start of the 1912 season. The Colts had two managers over their five seasons, Pearl Casey (1909) and Nick Williams (1911–14). Towards the end of the 1914 season, McCredie sold the team to timber mogul Quinn Farr who relocated the team to his native Ballard, Washington and changed their name to the Ballard Pippins. National Baseball Hall of Fame and Museum members Harry Heilmann and Dave Bancroft played for the Colts. Several other Major League Baseball alumni graced the Colts roster throughout their five seasons of existence. Aside from playing in the Northwestern League the Colts also played several exhibition games including one during the 1913 season against the Chicago American Giants of the Negro leagues.

== History ==
Before the start of the 1909 season, the Colts held their training camp in Ashland, Oregon. The team toured several Oregon towns including Jacksonville and Grants Pass and played baseball teams composed of locals. The Colts first game was played on April 4, 1909 against the Seattle Turks at Dugdale Field in front of 8,000 attendees. Seattle defeated Portland, 5–2. The Colts home opener in Portland was held before the Portland Beavers home opener on May 11, 1909 at Vaughn Street Park. The games would be preceded by a parade for each teams. The Colts parade consisted of 60 automobiles. John F. Carroll threw out the ceremonial first pitch to district attorney George G. Cameron. The Colts won their home opener 3–2 against the Tacoma Tigers. The Northwestern League teams, including Portland, started attracting gamblers who made wagers on the games at local tobacco stores. In August 1909, the Colts traded Bill Chenault, Phil Cooney and Tom Murray to the Pacific Coast League (PCL) Portland Beavers in exchange for Charlie Armbruster and Dick Breen. For the entire 1909 season, Pearl Casey served as the Colts player-manager and led the club to a 79–88 record. In January 1910, the Colts owner William W. McCredie, who also owned the Beavers, decided to disband the team due to the strain of managing two teams playing on the same field. McCredie did claim that the Portland Colts turned a profit in their first season. The president of the league, William H. Lucas, said he was disappointing that Portland was abandoning its efforts to keep their second minor league team. He subsequently announced he was moving the league offices from the city of Portland to a city that housed a Northwest League team.

Despite giving the Northwestern League franchise up in 1910, William W. McCredie looked to return a second team to Portland for the 1911 season. It was agreed upon by the league after Portland paid a US$1,000 entry fee. To avoid conflicts with Pacific Coast League games played at Vaughn Street Park the Northwestern League agreed to let PCL games get higher priority if any scheduling errors arose. McCredie agreed to a waiver clause that stated if he was to disband his team again, other Northwestern League teams would be able to buy their players before an outside league. The reason for this rule was because McCredie dumped all of his players from the 1909 season, even adding some to his PCL team for discounted prices. The team held work outs at Columbia University before the start of the 1911 season. Due to conflicts with the PCL schedule, the Northwestern League team played 15 weeks in other cities as opposed to nine weeks at home in 1911. Portland played at McKenna Park in the University Park neighborhood on Sunday exhibition games during the season.

At the end of the 1912 Northwestern League season the Colts played an exhibition game against the Portland Beavers at Vaughn Street Park. Colts owner William W. McCredie requested an exhibition game be played against the Negro league Chicago American Giants in 1913. Later, the Northwestern League scheduled every team in the league play an exhibition game against the Negro league team. In 1914, the Colts held their annual training camp in Santa Rosa, California. During the 1914 mid-season, McCredie sold the Colts to timber mogul Quinn Farr who announced his intention of relocation the team to Ballard, Washington. The reason for the sale of the team, McCredie claimed, was due to the fact Portland's franchise was going to be revoked for the 1915 season because opponents travel expenses to the city were too high.

== Notable players ==
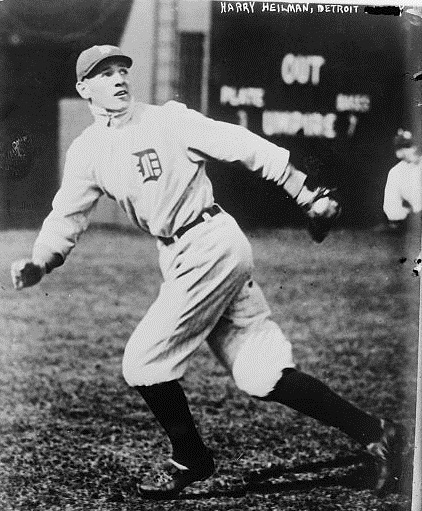
National Baseball Hall of Fame and Museum member Harry Heilmann played for the Portland Colts during the 1913 season

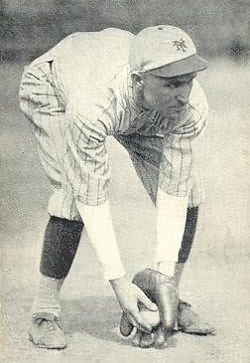
Dave Bancroft played three years in Portland, Oregon, one with the Colts.

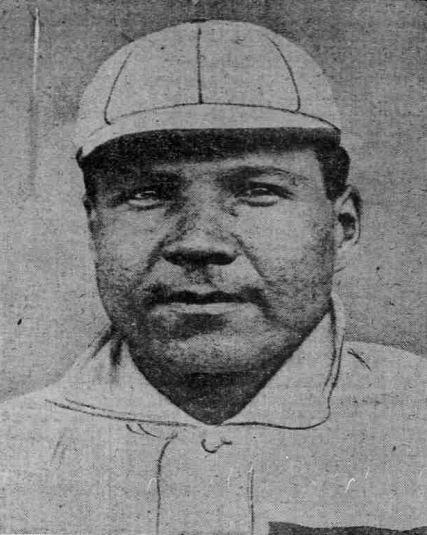
Ed Pinnance, the first Native American to play in Major League Baseball, was a member of the Colts in 1909.

HOF	Indicates a member of the National Baseball Hall of Fame.

Name	Position	Year(s)	Ref
Dave Bancroft HOF	Shortstop	1913	
Jack Bradley	Catcher	1911	
Ray Callahan	Pitcher	1912	
Al Carson	Pitcher	1913	
Jack Fournier	First baseman	1909	
Howie Haworth	Catcher	1914	
Harry Heilmann HOF	Outfielder	1913	
Oscar Jones	Pitcher	1914	
Jack Kibble	Infielder	1912	
Ed Kinsella	Pitcher	1909	
Fred Lamlein	Pitcher	1911	
Chris Mahoney	Outfielder	1912	
Carl Mays	Pitcher	1913	
Kid Mohler	Second baseman	1913	
Charlie Mullen	First baseman	1909	
Milo Netzel	Outfielder	1913–14	
Ned Pettigrew	Outfielder	1911	
Ed Pinnance	Pitcher	1909	
Tom Seaton	Pitcher	1909	
Buck Stanley	Pitcher	1913	
Jesse Stovall	First baseman	1911	

== Records ==
=== Single-season records ===
This is a list of leaders of single-season statistics for the Portland Colts.

Year	Player	Category	Record
1913	Harry Heilmann	Batting average	.305
1911	Howard Mundorff	Hits	184
1912	Edward Fries	At-bats	660
1911	Howard Mundorff	Doubles	36
1912	Bill Speas	Triples	11
1912	Lee Strait	Home runs	21
1909	Ed Kinsella	Wins	23
1909, 1914	Ed Pinnance, Elmer Leonard	Losses	18

== See also ==
- History of baseball in Portland, Oregon
- Portland Beavers
