= Lee Magee =

American baseball player and manager (1889–1966)

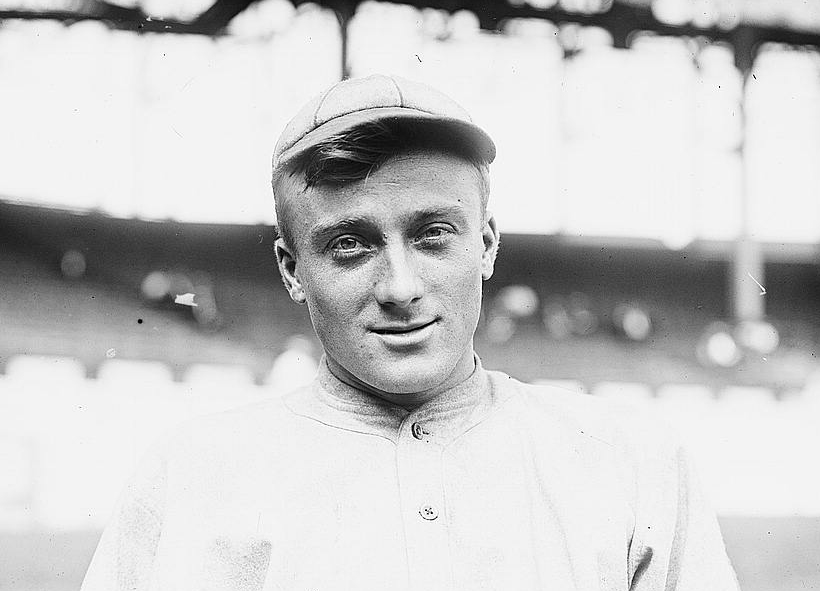
- Magee in 1913
- Second baseman / Outfielder
- Born: June 4, 1889; Cincinnati, Ohio, U.S.
- Died: March 14, 1966 (aged 76); Columbus, Ohio, U.S.
- Batted: Switch Threw: Right

MLB debut
- July 4, 1911, for the St. Louis Cardinals

Last MLB appearance
- September 28, 1919, for the Chicago Cubs

MLB statistics
- Batting average: .276
- Home runs: 12
- Runs batted in: 277
- Stats at Baseball Reference
- Managerial record at Baseball Reference

Teams
- As player: St. Louis Cardinals (1911–1914); Brooklyn Tip-Tops (1915); New York Yankees (1916–1917); St. Louis Browns (1917); Cincinnati Reds (1918); Brooklyn Robins (1919); Chicago Cubs (1919); As manager: Brooklyn Tip-Tops (1915)

Leo Christopher "Lee" Magee (born Leopold Christopher Hoernschemeyer; June 4, 1889 – March 14, 1966) was an American Major League Baseball player and manager between 1911 and 1919. While he played the majority of his professional games in the outfield, he also played the infield frequently. In 1915, he was a player/manager for the Brooklyn Tip-Tops of the Federal League for most of the season. The team was 53–64 under his management.

Magee was later banned from baseball for his ties to gamblers and match fixing, but would later be posthumously reinstated in 2025.

== Professional career ==
Magee signed with the Seattle Turks of the Northwestern League for the 1909 season. The Oregonian noted "To provide against a possible loss of [Pug] Bennett, [Dan] Dugdale signed Lee Magee, a fast youngster, who so far has justified the advance press dope of his touters that he handles himself in the field like Johnny Evers." On August 19, 1909, Magee was sold to the St. Louis Cardinals by the Seattle Turks of the Northwestern League.

In 1915, Magee was sued by the St. Louis Cardinals after he jumped to the Brooklyn Tip-Tops in the Federal League. James A. Gilmore, president of the Federal League, instructed Magee to ignore the suit.

In 1015 games over nine seasons, Magee posted a .276 batting average (1031-for-3741) with 467 runs, 133 doubles, 54 triples, 12 home runs, 277 RBI, 186 stolen bases and 265 bases on balls. Defensively, he finished his career with an overall .962 fielding percentage.

=== Banishment ===
As a ballplayer with the Chicago Cubs, Magee and Hal Chase of the Philadelphia Phillies were accused of fixing a game on August 31, 1919, by the Cook County, Illinois, grand jury investigating the Black Sox scandal. In response Cubs president Bill Veeck released Magee. Magee filed suit against the Cubs for $9,500 in lost wages and bonuses in 1920. He claimed to have damning evidence which would be the "biggest bomb in baseball history". The jury ruled in favor of the Cubs on June 9, 1920.

Magee was reinstated by Commissioner Rob Manfred on May 13, 2025, along with other deceased players who were on the ineligible list.

== Personal life ==
Magee was accused by Fred W. Kleine of St. Louis, Missouri in a reply to his wife Harriet Kleine's petition for divorce, with a charge that Harriet would meet Magee and other baseball players at Robison Field and bring them home. In one instance in May 1910, Fred W. Kleine claimed he found his wife drinking beer with Magee, Jack Bliss and Kitty Knight. Another instance, according to Fred W. Kleine, his wife had to assist an inebriated Magee down their stairs. All of the players denied wrongdoing, but said they had been guests at the Kleine's house, which was across the street from the ballpark. Magee responded that it was a leg injury that made him require assistance down the Kleine's stairs. The Oregonian noted that "Magee's name in a divorce suit along with other ball players, is not much of a surprise. Lee was a handsome boy and women admired him. He had an escapade on a sleeping car when he was playing first [base] for Seattle, that took diplomacy on the part of president Dugdale to smooth over."

Magee married Beatrice Rogers in 1917 and during this time Magee petitioned the court in Cincinnati to legally change his name from Leopold Christopher Hoernschemeyer to Lee Magee. According to The Oregonian this was done so his wife would be known as Mrs. Magee following their marriage. Magee died on March 14, 1966 at St. Anthony's Hospital in Columbus, Ohio after a brief illness. Magee would be buried at Saint Joseph Cemetery in Lockbourne, Ohio.

== See also ==
- List of Major League Baseball career stolen bases leaders
- List of Major League Baseball player-managers
