= Everett Smokestackers =

- 1905; Everett, Washington

Minor league affiliations
- Class: Class B (1905)
- League: Northwestern League (1905)

Major league affiliations
- Team: None

Minor league titles
- League titles (1): 1905

Team data
- Name: Everett Smokestackers (1905)
- Ballpark: Fairgrounds Stadium (1905)

The Everett Smokestackers were a minor league baseball team based in Everett, Washington. In 1905, the Smokestackers played as members of the Class B level Northwestern League, winning the league championship in their only season of play. Everett hosted home games at Fairgrounds Stadium.

Many decades later, the Everett Smokestackers were succeeded in minor league play by the 1984 Everett Giants, who began play as members of the Class A level Northwest League.

== History ==
Minor league baseball began in Everett, Washington in 1905. The Everett Smokestackers franchise were charter members of the reformed four–team Class B level Northwestern League. The Smokestackers were joined by the Bellingham Yankees, Vancouver Horse Doctors and Spokane Indians in completing 1910 league play.

The Everett use of the "Smokestackers" moniker corresponds to local business and industry in the era. With numerous factories on the waterfront in the era in Everett, Washington, the city became known as the "City of Smokestacks."

On the home opening day on May 13, 1905, Bellingham reportedly drew over 5,000 fans for the home opener. It was noted that local businesses closed at 2:30 P.M for the home game and that the local sawmills also closed at 12:00P P.M. Everett defeated the Bellingham Yankees 9–3 in their home opener.

After beginning league play on May 9, 1905, the Everett Smokestackers won the Northwestern League championship, as the planned season schedule was shortened to ending on September 11, 1905. Everett placed first in the final league standings with a record of 60–37, playing the season under manager Billy Hulen. Everett finished 11.0 games ahead the second place Bellingham Yankees (49–48) in the final standing as the league had no playoffs due to Everett winning both halves of the split–season schedule. It was reported that the first–half season schedule ended in a tie between Vancouver and Everett. As Everett won the second half, the championship was awarded to Everett. The Vancouver Horse Doctors (45–52) and Spokane Indians (41–58) followed in the final league overall standings. Pitcher Hick Belt of Everett led the Northwestern League with 18 wins.

After winning the 1905 championship, the Everett franchise did not return to play in the 1906 Northwestern League season, as Spokane was the only surviving franchise. The 1906 Northwestern League continued as a four–team league, with a lineup of the Butte Miners, Grays Harbor Grays, Spokane Indians and Tacoma Tigers, with Tacoma winning the championship.

In 1984, minor league baseball returned to Everett, Washington as the Everett Giants franchise began play. The Everett Giants became members of the Northwest League, a Class A level league.

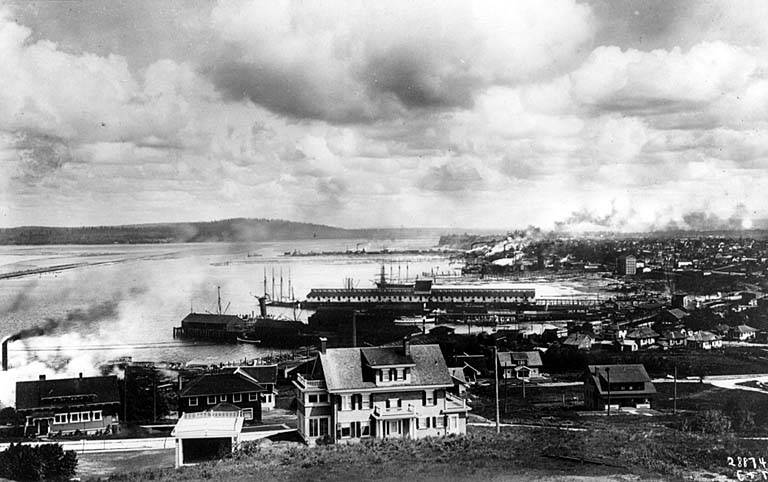
(1914) Everett waterfront and Port Gardner Bay. Everett, Washington.

== The ballpark ==
The 1905 Everett Smokestackers played home minor league games at Fairgrounds Stadium. The ballpark was located at Broadway Avenue & Everett Avenue in Everett.

== Year–by–year record ==
Year	Record	Finish	Manager	Playoffs/Notes
1905	60–37	1st	Billy Hulen	League champions

== Notable alumni ==
- Bill Brinker (1905)
- George Bristow (1905)
- Jack Burns (1905)
- Heinie Heitmuller (1905)
- Billy Hulen (1905, MGR)
- Dave Rowan (1905)
