= Phil Cooney =

Phil Cooney may refer to:

- Philip Cooney (born 1959), American lobbyist
- Phil Cooney (baseball) (1882–1957), baseball player
