= Mose Solomon =

American baseball player (1900-1966)

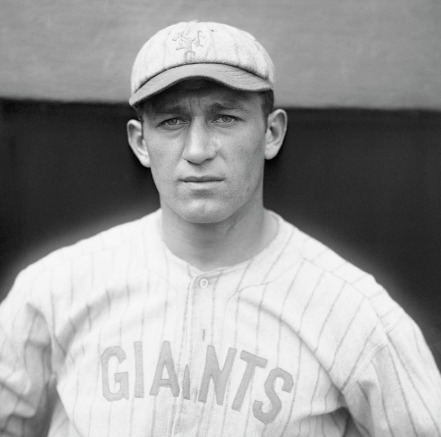
- Solomon in 1923
- Outfielder
- Born: December 8, 1900; New York, New York
- Died: June 25, 1966 (aged 65); Miami, Florida
- Batted: Left Threw: Left

Professional debut
- MiLB: 1921, for the Vancouver Beavers
- MLB: September 30, 1923, for the New York Giants

Last appearance
- MiLB: 1929, for the Canton Terriers
- MLB: October 7, 1923, for the New York Giants

MiLB statistics
- Games: 606
- Batting average: .320
- Home runs: 71

MLB statistics
- Batting average: .375
- Home runs: 0
- Runs batted in: 1
- Stats at Baseball Reference

Teams
- New York Giants (1923)

Career highlights and awards
- Set minor league home run record, with 49 (1923)

Mose Hirsch Solomon, nicknamed the Rabbi of Swat (December 8, 1900 – June 25, 1966) was an American left-handed baseball player. In 1923, he hit 49 home runs in the minors, a new minor league record. He briefly played for the New York Giants in Major League Baseball in 1923.

== Early and personal life ==
Solomon, who was Jewish, was born on Hester Street on the Lower East Side in New York City. His parents were Benjamin (born in Russia; a peddler and junk dealer) and Anna (Hertz) Solomon (born in Austria), and were observant Jews. While Solomon was young, the family moved to Columbus, Ohio. His childhood nickname was "Hickory". He attended Columbus Commerce High School, where he was All-City in baseball and football. His brother became an Ohio champion boxer, fighting under the name Henry Sully.

He became a professional football player, playing as a ringer with Jim Thorpe on the Carlisle Indian School team.

Solomon married the former Gertrude Nachmanovitz. They moved to Miami, Florida, where Solomon became a building contractor. Solomon died there on June 25, 1966, of heart failure.

== Minor leagues ==
=== Prior to major league career ===
Solomon began his professional career with the Vancouver Beavers of the Pacific Coast International League in 1921. He hit .313 with 13 home runs in 115 games, batting left-handed and playing first base and outfield. In 1922, he playing again with Vancouver, and then with the Tacoma Tigers.

In 1923 Solomon hit 49 home runs (a new minor league record, breaking the old minor league record of 45 set in 1895) in 108 games for the Class C Southwestern League Hutchinson Wheat Shockers in Kansas. He also had a .421 batting average, leading the league, while he played primarily first base and right field. In 527 at bats, he also led the league in runs, hits (222), doubles (40), total bases (439), and slugging percentage (.833), and had 15 triples.

=== After major league career ===
From 1924 to 1928, Solomon again played in the minor leagues, never advancing past class AA. He batted over .300 with a number of teams, "but a broken collarbone suffered in a football game in 1924 made it difficult for him to pull the ball, and he never again hit more than seven home runs in a season." In 1924 he played for the Toledo Mud Hens, Bridgeport Bears, Waterbury Brasscos, and Pittsfield Hillies, in 1925 he played for Toledo again, the Hartford Senators, and the Albany Senators. He then played for Albany in 1926-28, and for the Canton Terriers in his last year in 1929, at 28 years of age.

== Major leagues ==
In September 1923 the New York Giants bought out his contract, and signed the muscular 22-year-old Solomon to a major league contract. The Sporting News ran the headline that Giants scout "Dick Kinsella Finds That $100,000 Jew". Due to antisemitic remarks about Solomon being Jewish, he had been in a number of fights in the minor leagues. Dick Kinsella observed that: "In every case Solomon has won the fight."

The New York Giants had been looking for a star Jewish player to attract fans the way Babe Ruth did for the New York Yankees. With a great deal of publicity, team manager John McGraw introduced Solomon to the press as the "Rabbi of Swat". The press accordingly nicknamed the native New Yorker that, as well as "the Jewish Babe Ruth". Manager McGraw told the press "We appreciate that many of the fans in New York are Jews, and we have been trying to land a prospect of Jewish blood." He became the most talked-about player on the team, and attendance shot up.

Solomon made his major league debut in right field at the Polo Grounds on September 30, 1923. He drove in the game-winning run in the 10th inning to give the Giants a walk-off victory. However, Solomon's batting skills could not compensate for his poor fielding average of only .833 (one error out of six plays), and McGraw kept him languishing on the team's bench. At the plate, Solomon had a .375 batting average (three-for-eight, with one double and one RBI) in his two major league games. He was sold by the Giants after the 1923 season, to Toledo of the minor league American Association.

Years later, an article in Sports Illustrated noted: "He was a designated hitter, born 73 years too soon".

== See also ==
- Jews and Baseball: An American Love Story, 2010 documentary
- List of Jewish Major League Baseball players
