= Jesse Baker (pitcher) =

American baseball player (1888–1972)

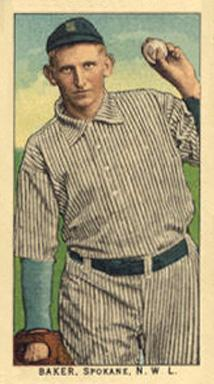
- Pitcher
- Born: June 3, 1888; Anderson Island, Washington
- Died: September 26, 1972 (aged 84); Tacoma, Washington
- Batted: Left Threw: Left

MLB debut
- April 23, 1911, for the Chicago White Sox

Last MLB appearance
- September 4, 1911, for the Chicago White Sox

MLB statistics
- Win–loss record: 2–7
- Earned run average: 3.93
- Strikeouts: 51
- Stats at Baseball Reference

Teams
- Chicago White Sox (1911)

Jesse Ormond Baker (June 3, 1888 – September 26, 1972) was a pitcher in Major League Baseball. He played for the Chicago White Sox in 1911 and also spent seven years in the minor leagues. Baker was 5 feet, 11 inches tall and weighed 188 pounds.

== Career ==
Baker was born in a log cabin on Anderson Island, Washington. He started his professional baseball career in 1908 with the Northwestern League's Tacoma Tigers. That season, he had a win–loss record of 10–14. In 1909, he played for the Tigers again before being traded to the Spokane Indians in the middle of the season. He went 14–26 to lead the league in losses but also had 249 strikeouts to top the circuit in that category, as well.

In 1910, Baker had arguably his best season, as he went 28–10 and led the Northwestern League in innings pitched (335.1) and wins. The American League's Chicago White Sox purchased his release, in August, for $6,000 and two other players.

On April 23, 1911, Baker made his debut with the White Sox and became the first player from Pierce County, Washington, to appear in the major leagues. He started eight games for Chicago that year, relieved in 14 games, and finished 2–7 with a 3.93 earned run average. That was the only year he played in the majors.

Baker then spent the next two seasons in the Pacific Coast League, winning a total of 23 games there. He finished his professional baseball career back in the Northwestern League in 1914. Overall, he pitched in 225 minor league games and had a win–loss record of 91–91 to go along with his 2–7 major league mark.

Baker died in Tacoma, Washington, in 1972, and was buried in Mountain View Memorial Park.
