= Pacific Coast International League =

- Formerly: Northwestern League
- Classification: Class B (1918, 1920–1921)
- Sport: Minor League Baseball
- First season: 1918
- Folded: 1921
- Replaced by: Western International League
- President: Bob Blewett (1918); Louis H. Burnett (1920–1921)
- No. of teams: 9
- Country: Canada; United States of America
- Most titles: 1 Seattle Giants (1918); Victoria Islanders (1920); Yakima Indians (1921)
- Related competitions: Northwest International League (1919)

The Pacific Coast International League was a minor league baseball league that played between 1918 and 1922. The Class B level league franchises were based in the Northwest United States and British Columbia.

== History ==
The Pacific Coast International League was a re–branding of the former Northwestern League and was known as the Northwest International League in 1919. In 1922, the name was changed to the Western International League.

Teams in the league included the Aberdeen Black Cats, Portland Buckaroos, Seattle Giants, Spokane Indians, Tacoma Tigers, Vancouver Beavers, Victoria Islanders and Yakima Indians.

As the Northwest International League, it consisted of two Washington–based teams and two Canada-based teams: the Seattle Drydockers, Tacoma Tigers, Vancouver Beavers and Victoria Tyrees. On June 8, 1919, the league disbanded, with the Beavers in first place. Therefore, they were the de facto league champions. The Tigers finished in last place with a 5–17 record. Wally Hood, who played in the major leagues from 1920 to 1922, spent time in the league.

Hall of Fame baseball pitcher Joe McGinnity played for the Vancouver Beavers in 1918.

== Cities represented ==
- Aberdeen, WA: Aberdeen Black Cats 1918
- Portland, OR: Portland Buckaroos 1918
- Seattle, WA: Seattle Giants 1918, 1920
- Spokane, WA: Spokane Indians 1918, 1920
- Tacoma, WA: Tacoma Tigers 1918, 1920–1921
- Vancouver, BC: Vancouver Beavers 1918, 1920–1921
- Vancouver, WA: Vancouver Beavers 1918
- Victoria, BC: Victoria Islanders 1920; Victoria Bees 1921
- Yakima, WA: Yakima Indians 1920–1921

== Standings and statistics ==
=== 1918 Pacific Coast International League ===
schedule

Team standings	W	L	PCT	GB	Managers
Seattle Giants	40	28	.588	–	Bill Leard
Portland Buckaroos	37	28	.569	1.5	Bill Fisher
Aberdeen Black Cats	32	35	.478	7.5	Dick Egan
Vancouver Beavers / Vancouver (WA) Beavers	26	39	.388	16.0	Robert Brown; James A. Hamilton
Tacoma Tigers	13	9	.591	NA	Bill Speas
Spokane Indians	9	16	.360	NA	Nick Williams

Tacoma and Spokane disbanded May 26; Vancouver, British Columbia (26–28) moved to Vancouver, Washington June 25.
The league suspended operations July 7.

Player statistics
Player	Team	Stat	Tot	Player	Team	Stat	Tot
Cliff Lee	Portland	BA	.359	Cyrus Young	Seattle	W	13
Bob Smale	Seattle	Runs	62	Frank Rapp	Portland	SO	80
Bevo LeBourveau	Seattle	Hits	91	Cyrus Young	Seattle	Pct	.867; 13–2
Bill Fisher	Portland	HR	4				

=== 1920 Pacific Coast International League ===
schedule

Team standings	W	L	PCT	GB	Managers
Victoria Islanders	69	46	.600	–	Bill Leard
Yakima Indians	65	48	.575	3.0	Frank Raymond
Vancouver Beavers	65	50	.565	4.0	Bob Brown / William Kirby
Tacoma Tigers	66	53	.555	5.0	Bobby Vaughn
Spokane Indians	56	58	.491	12.5	Cliff Blankenship
Seattle Giants	24	90	.211	44.5	Dave Hillyard / Bill Kenworthy / Bill Hoffman

No Playoffs Scheduled.

Player statistics
Player	Team	Stat	Tot	Player	Team	Stat	Tot
Paul Strand	Yakima	BA	.339	Bert Cole	Tacoma	W	24
Charlie Gorman	Yakima	Runs	101	Harry Morton	Victoria	SO	198
Jim Harrigan	Yakima	Hits	156	Bert Cole	Tacoma	Pct	.774; 24–7
Tiny Graham	Tacoma	Hits	156				
Lee Dempsey	Victoria	HR	19				

=== 1921 Pacific Coast International League ===
schedule

Team standings	W	L	PCT	GB	Managers
Yakima Indians	79	36	.687	–	Frank Raymond
Tacoma Tigers	63	53	.543	16.5	Charles Mullen
Victoria Bees	45	71	.388	34.5	Cliff Blankenship / Elmer Hansen
Vancouver Beavers	45	72	.385	35.0	Billy Purtell

No Playoffs Scheduled.

Player statistics
Player	Team	Stat	Tot	Player	Team	Stat	Tot
George Lafayette	Yakima	BA	.428	Guy Cooper	Yakima	W	22
George Lafayette	Yakima	Runs	132	Guy Cooper	Yakima	SO	162
George Lafayette	Yakima	Hits	179	Henry Robcke	Tacoma	Pct	.762 16–5
Ed Handley	Victoria	HR	15				
