= Bob Brown (baseball, born 1876) =

American-born Canadian baseball player, manager, and team owner

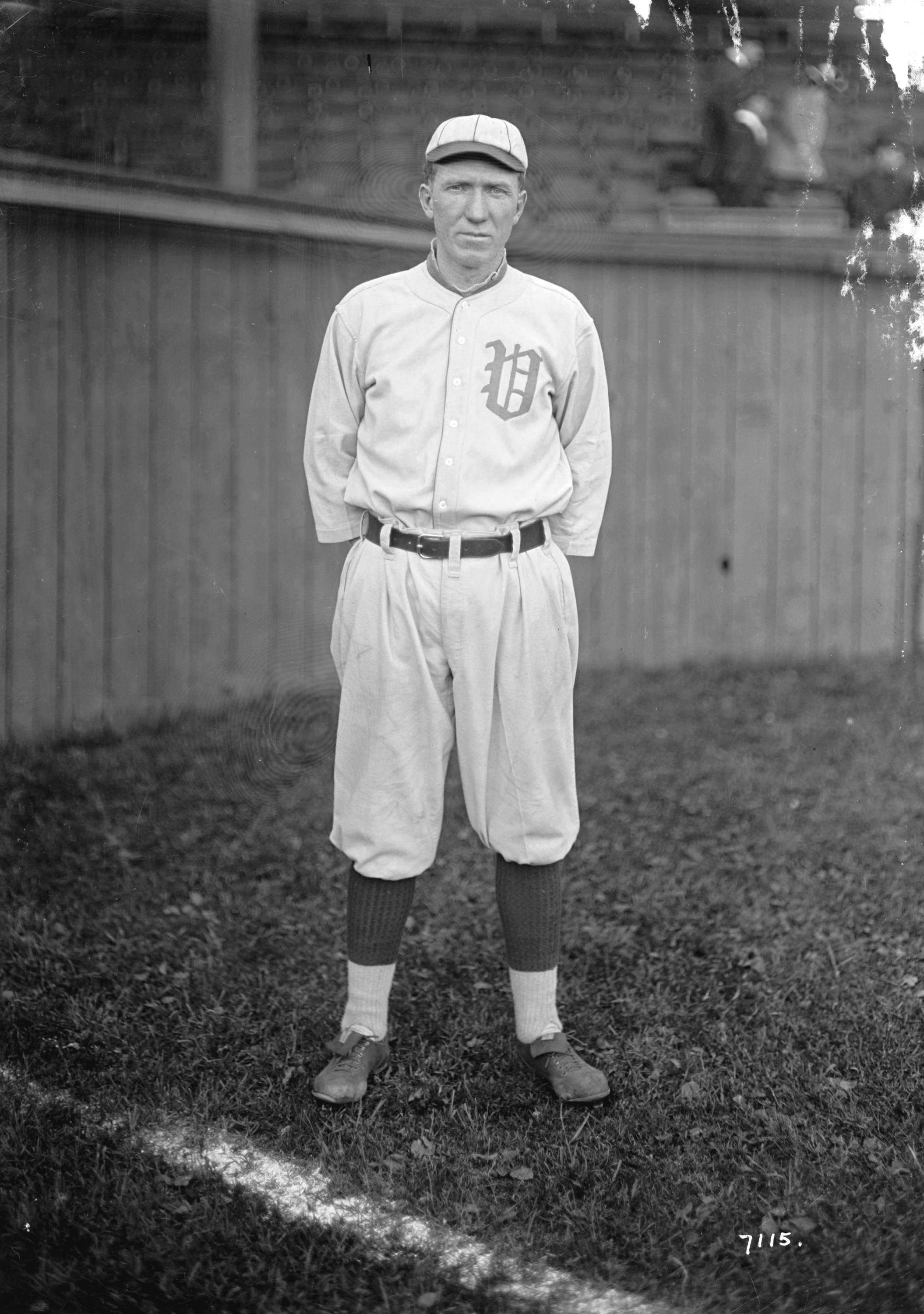
- Brown in 1919, as manager of the Vancouver Beavers
- Outfielder / Middle infielder / Manager / Owner
- Born: July 5, 1876; Scranton, Pennsylvania, U.S.
- Died: June 17, 1962 (aged 85); Vancouver, British Columbia, Canada
- Batted: Unknown Threw: Right

Member of the Canadian

Baseball Hall of Fame
- Induction: 1989

Robert Paul Brown (July 5, 1876 – June 17, 1962) was an American-born Canadian professional baseball player, manager, and team owner. He was active in minor league baseball in various capacities from 1900 through 1953, appearing in over 600 games as player and managing for at least 14 seasons. He was a graduate of the University of Notre Dame and served in the U.S. military during the Spanish–American War.

== Baseball career ==
As a player, Brown was listed at 5 feet 8 inches (1.73 m) and 156 pounds (71 kg); he threw right-handed. He played primarily as an outfielder and middle infielder. Note that minor league baseball records from the era that Brown was a player and manager are often incomplete.

=== Player ===
Brown's professional baseball career spanned 1900 to 1917, with gaps, and a final season in 1926. In 1900, he started his minor career with the Helena Senators, where he was teammates with Joe Tinker. Early career stops included Pendleton, Oregon; Portland, Oregon; and Aberdeen, Washington, where in 1904, where he was catcher, manager and ran a shoe store. His longest stay with a single team was with the Aberdeen Pippins of the Southwest Washington League during 1903–1905. Baseball records do not list him as playing professionally during 1908; he returned to play in 1909 with the Spokane Indians and in 1910 with the Vancouver Beavers. After not playing professionally during 1911–1914, he resumed playing with Vancouver in 1915 and 1916, and in Fort Dodge, Iowa, in 1917. Records also show him playing 34 games in the Southwestern League in 1926, when he was also manager of the team based in Ponca City, Oklahoma. Brown appeared in at least 666 minor league games as a player.

=== Manager ===
Brown was a manager for all or part of 14 seasons, as early as 1902 and as late as 1926. For many of those season, he was also a player. He first managed the Pendleton team in 1902, and then managed every season from 1904 through 1911, including four seasons in Aberdeen. After managing in Vancouver in 1910 and 1911, he did not manage for four seasons, then returned to manage in Vancouver during 1916, 1917, 1920, and 1922. His final season as a manager was 1926 with Ponca City, also his final season as a player.

=== Owner ===
Between the 1909 and 1910 seasons, Brown took over sixty percent ownership of the Vancouver Beavers for $500, moving to Canada to take on the role of the team's player-manager. While Brown owned the Beavers, manager Kitty Brashier guided the team to Northwestern League championships in 1911; the Beavers were also champions in 1913 and 1914, while the team was second in the league in 1912.

Brown also owned the Vancouver Beavers (later the Vancouver Capilanos). As a promoter, he organized the first night baseball game played in Canada, in 1930. Brown had built 5,000-seat Athletic Park on land leased from the Canadian Pacific Railway. The park opened 18 April 1913. The Beavers moved from Recreation Park that same year. He also initiated the building of Capilano Stadium, a 5,157-seat baseball stadium which opened 1951 in Vancouver.

Brown retired as owner of the Capilanos in 1953, the year he became President of the Western International League, a post he held only one year. He was named honorary league president in 1954, and honorary president of the Vancouver Mounties in 1956.

=== Honours ===
In 1952, Sporting News named Brown one of the ten best general managers in baseball. In 1966, Brown was inducted as an inaugural member into the BC Sports Hall of Fame in the baseball category, and in 1989 he was inducted into the Canadian Baseball Hall of Fame as a builder. The Vancouver Canadians mascot is named “Bob Brown Bear” in honour of him.

== Personal life ==
Born on July 5, 1876, in Scranton, Pennsylvania, Brown attended the University of Notre Dame during the 1890s, where he played football with the Fighting Irish and won varsity letters in football and baseball. In 1898, he enlisted in the United States Army to fight in the Spanish–American War. He graduated from Notre Dame in 1900. Brown died on June 23, 1962, in St. Paul's Hospital, Vancouver.
