= Northwest International League =

- Formerly: Pacific Coast International League
- Classification: Class B (1919)
- Sport: Minor League Baseball
- First season: 1919
- Folded: June 8, 1919
- Replaced by: Pacific Coast International League
- President: J. M. Osmond (1919)
- No. of teams: 4
- Country: Canada; United States of America
- Most titles: 1 Vancouver Beavers (1919)

The Northwest International League was a minor league baseball league that played briefly in the 1919 season. The four–team Class B level league evolved from the 1918 Pacific Coast International League, with franchises based in Washington and British Columbia.

== History ==
In 1919, the Pacific Coast International League, which was formerly the Northwestern League, changed its name to become the "Northwest International League" for the 1919 season, before reverting to the Pacific Coast International League name for the 1920 season. J. M. Osmond served as president of the 1919 Northwest International League.

Beginning play on April 23, 1919, the Northwest International League consisted of two Washington–based teams and two Canada–based teams. The Seattle Giants, Tacoma Tigers, Vancouver Beavers and Victoria Tyrees were the league members.

On June 5, 1919, the Tacoma Tigers franchise folded, leaving the league with three remaining teams. On June 8, 1919, the league disbanded. The Vancouver Beavers finished in 1st place with a 20–14 record, ending the season 1.0 game ahead of 2nd place Seattle (16–12) and 2.0 games ahead of 3rd place Victoria (14–12). The Tacoma Tigers finished in last place with a 5–17 record.

The Pacific Coast International league reformed for the 1920 season.

== Cities represented ==
- Seattle, WA: Seattle Giants 1919
- Tacoma, WA: Tacoma Tigers 1919
- Vancouver, BC: Vancouver Beavers 1919
- Victoria, BC: Victoria Tyees 1919

== Standings & statistics ==
1919 Northwest International League
schedule

Team name	W	L	PCT	GB	Managers
Vancouver Beavers	20	14	.588	–	Bill Speas
Seattle Giants	16	12	.571	1	Joe Devine
Victoria Tyees	14	12	.538	2	Duncan Hamilton
Tacoma Tigers	5	17	.227	9	Walter Cadman

Tacoma disbanded June 5. League to disbanded June 8.

Player statistics
Player	Team	Stat	Tot	Player	Team	Stat	Tot
George Armstrong	Victoria	BA	.435	Babe Gibson	Seattle	PCT	.727 8–3
Carl Hinkle	Victoria	Runs	31	Wayne Barham	Vancouver	PCT	.727 8–3
Bill Speas	Vancouver	Hits	44				
Carl Hinkle	Victoria	HR	9				
