= Harry Ostdiek =

American baseball player (1881–1956)

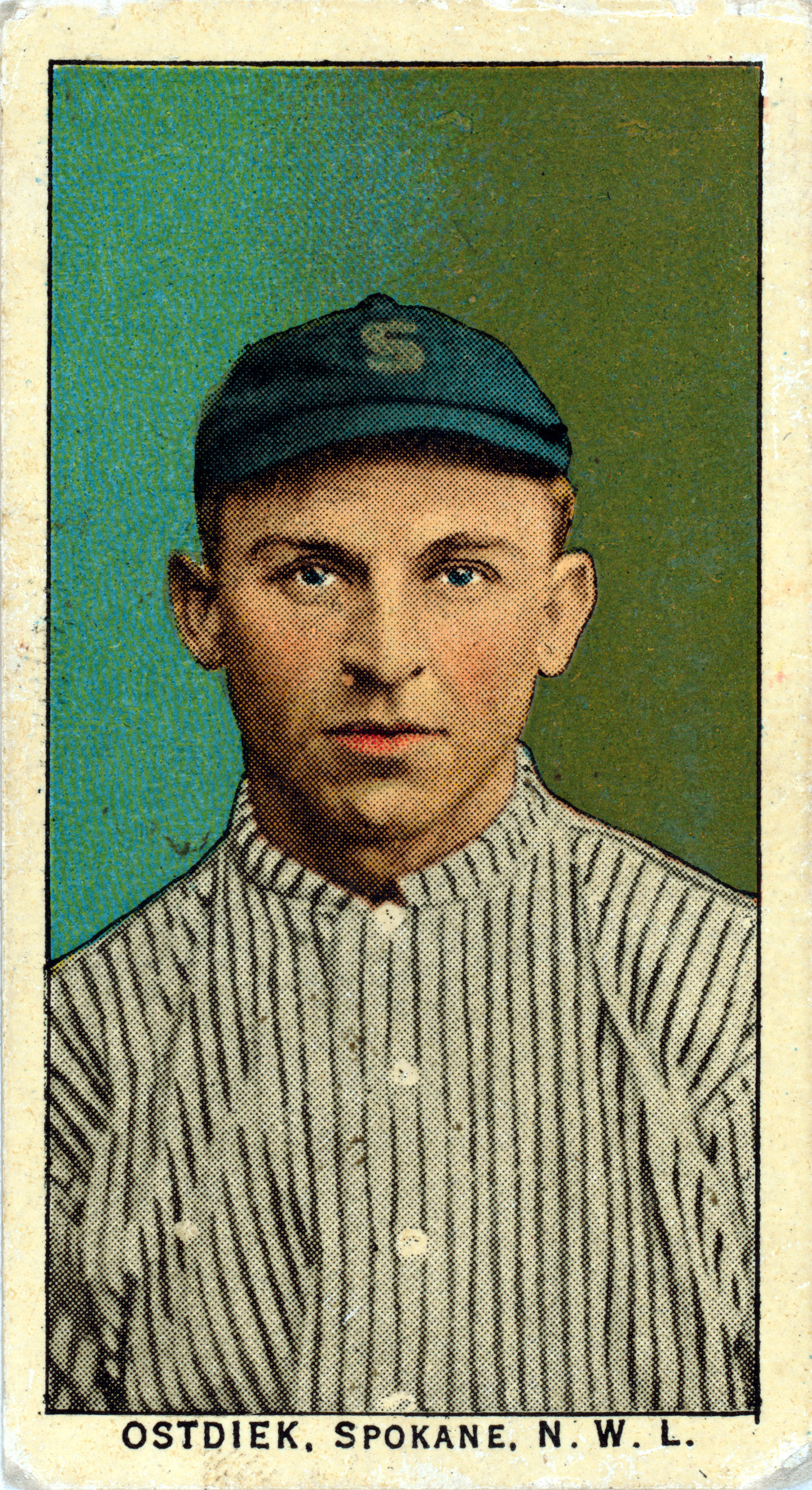
- Catcher
- Born: April 12, 1881; Ottumwa, Iowa, U.S.
- Died: May 6, 1956 (aged 75); Minneapolis, Minnesota, U.S.
- Batted: Right Threw: Right

MLB debut
- September 10, 1904, for the Cleveland Naps

Last MLB appearance
- October 7, 1908, for the Boston Red Sox

MLB statistics
- Batting average: .143
- Home runs: 0
- Runs batted in: 3
- Stats at Baseball Reference

Teams
- Cleveland Naps (1904); Boston Red Sox (1908)

Henry Girard Ostdiek (April 12, 1881 – May 6, 1956) was an American reserve catcher in Major League Baseball who played for the Cleveland Naps (1904) and Boston Red Sox (1908) during his major league career. Listed at 5 ft 11 in (1.80 m), 185 pounds (84 kg), Ostdiek batted and threw right-handed. He was born in Ottumwa, Iowa.

In an eight-game career, Ostdiek was a .143 hitter (3-for-21) with three RBI, one run, and one triple without a home run. In eight catching appearances, he posted a .935 fielding percentage, committing three errors in 46 chances.

Ostdiek died at the age of 75 in Minneapolis, Minnesota.
