= Art Bues =

American baseball player (1888–1954)

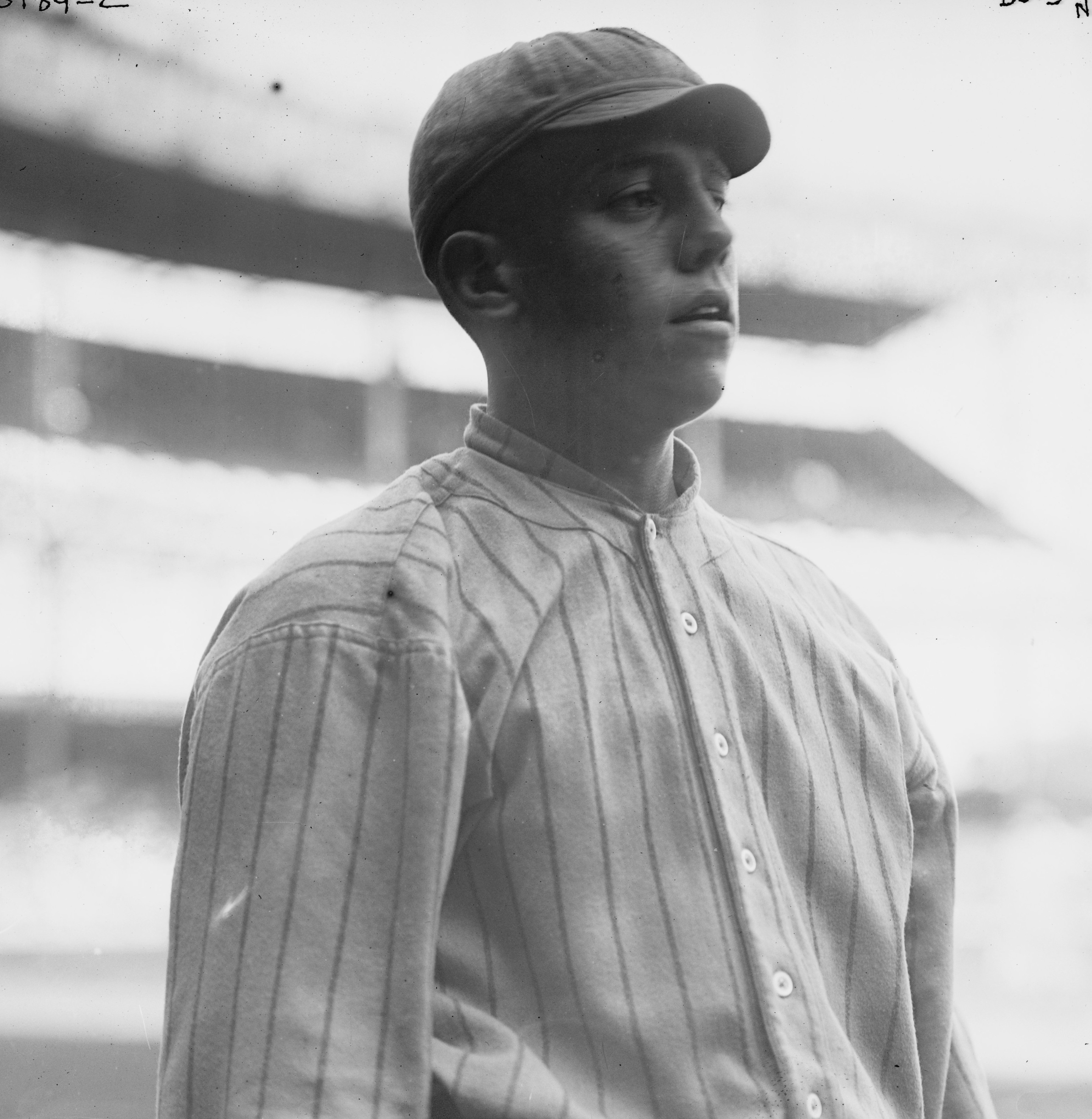
- Third baseman / Second baseman
- Born: March 3, 1888; Milwaukee, Wisconsin, U.S.
- Died: November 7, 1954 (aged 66); Whitefish Bay, Wisconsin, U.S.
- Batted: Right Threw: Right

MLB debut
- April 17, 1913, for the Boston Braves

Last MLB appearance
- October 4, 1914, for the Chicago Cubs

MLB statistics
- Fielding average: .968
- Putouts: 14
- Batting average: .217
- Stats at Baseball Reference

Teams
- Boston Braves (1913); Chicago Cubs (1914)

Arthur Frederick Bues (March 3, 1888 – November 7, 1954) was an American Major League Baseball third baseman. He was born on March 3, 1888, in Milwaukee, Wisconsin. He batted and threw right-handed, weighed 184 pounds (83 kg), and was 5 feet 11 inches (1.80 m). Bues was considered one of the best third basemen in the country during his career. Bues was the nephew of George Stallings. Bues originally played for Kansas City of the American Association and made his Major League debut on April 17, 1913, for the Boston Braves. He had just 1 at bat in 2 games. In 1914 he played for the Chicago Cubs in 14 games. He had 45 at-bats with 10 hits. He recorded no home runs and 4 RBIs.

Art Bues died on November 7, 1954, in Whitefish Bay, Wisconsin.
