= Athletic Park (Vancouver) =

Sports facility in Vancouver, Canada

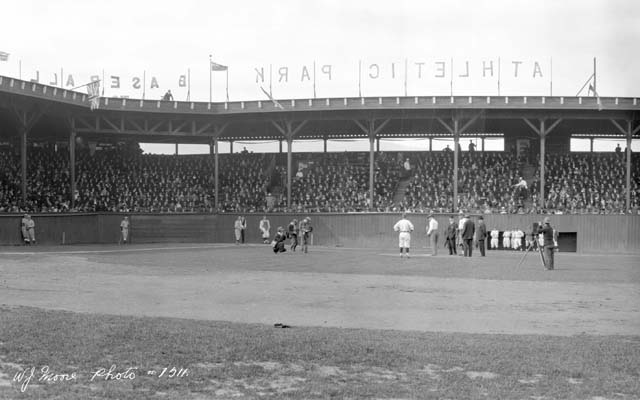
- Opening dedication of Athletic Park in Vancouver in 1913.
- Interactive map of Athletic Park
- Location: West 6th Avenue and Hemlock Street, Vancouver, BC, Canada
- Coordinates: 49°15′58.9″N 123°08′08.2″W
- Owner: Canadian Pacific Railway 1913-1944, Emil Sick 1944-1951.
- Operator: Bob Brown 1913-1944 on lease.
- Capacity: 6,000
- Surface: Grass

Construction
- Groundbreaking: 1910
- Opened: April 17, 1913
- Renovated: 1926 and 1945 after fires

Tenant
- Baseball: Vancouver Beavers (Northwestern League) 1913-1922. Vancouver Capilanos Western International Baseball League 1939-1950 Football: UBC Thunderbirds 1924-1930

Athletic Park was a sports facility in Vancouver, British Columbia, Canada mainly used for baseball but also hosted soccer, football, lacrosse, bike races, and rallies.

== Opening day ==
Bob Brown, the man who would later be known as Vancouver's "Mr. Baseball" cleared the stadium site himself, and was responsible for the building of the structure made entirely out of wood.

Athletic Park replaced Recreation Park. It was on a narrow block bounded by Hemlock Street (west, first base); 6th Avenue (south, a very short right field); Birch Street (east, left field); railroad tracks (northeast); and 5th Avenue imaginary line (north, third base). Newspaper advertisements typically gave the location as "5th and Hemlock". Today, the bend that the joins 4th avenue to 6th avenue under the hemlock viaduct goes right through the Athletic Parks’ former footprint.

The park opened April 17, 1913, with a baseball game featuring the Vancouver Beavers who defeated the Tacoma Tigers 8–4 before a then-record 5,663 spectators. The opening of the facility was launched with an hour-long civic parade, which according to the Vancouver Province, "...commenced at the post office promptly at 2 o'clock and wended its way along Cordova to Main, along Main to Hastings and west along Hastings to Granville and then proceeded up Granville to Fifth Avenue and the ball park."

The first admission prices were 25 and 50 cents.

== Significant events ==
After staging an "all-star" game on Christmas Day 1923, in January and February 1924 the first organized league of "Canadian Rugby-Football" in the province of British Columbia was played out of Athletic Park featuring UBC, Knights of Columbus, Y.M.C.A and King George Grads. The odd dates on the calendar for the games were due to baseball limiting access to the new game. The founding of the four team league is regarded by both the UBC Thunderbirds and Football BC as the start of organized football for both operations.

The first baseball game played under the lights in Canada was won by the Vancouver Firemen 5-3 over Vancouver Arrows, July 3, 1931. In second part of the double header, Vancouver Athletic Club beat B.C. Telephone 1-0. Both games were five innings.

Babe Ruth played at Athletic Park on October 19, 1934, along with his team of "American League All-Stars" that included Lou Gehrig, Lefty Gomez, Charlie Gehringer, Heinie Manush, Lefty O'Doul, and manager Connie Mack.

== Fire and rebuilding ==
There were two fires at Athletic Park followed by two rapid rebuilds. The first was in 1926. The second on February 28, 1945, caused $50,000 worth of damage. By then, Emil Sick owned the ball club and the park, which he had renamed Sick's Capilano Stadium in 1944.

The park was demolished in 1951 to allow the Hemlock viaduct to be built. The soil from the park was taken to the newly built Capilano Stadium (II), later renamed Nat Bailey Stadium.
