= Bobby Keefe =

American baseball player (1882–1964)

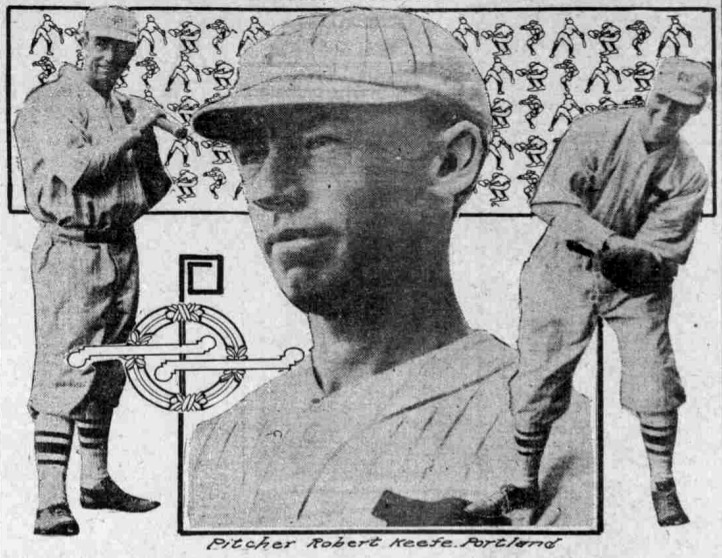
- Pitcher
- Born: June 16, 1882; Folsom, California, U.S.
- Died: December 6, 1964 (aged 82); Sacramento, California, U.S.
- Batted: Right Threw: Right

MLB debut
- April 15, 1907, for the New York Highlanders

Last MLB appearance
- July 26, 1912, for the Cincinnati Reds

MLB statistics
- Win–loss record: 16–21
- Earned run average: 3.14
- Strikeouts: 154
- Stats at Baseball Reference

Teams
- New York Highlanders (1907); Cincinnati Reds (1911–1912)

Robert Francis Keefe (June 16, 1882 – December 6, 1964) was an American pitcher in professional baseball. He played in Major League Baseball (MLB) for the New York Highlanders and Cincinnati Reds.

== Baseball career ==
Keefe was born in Folsom, California, in 1882. In 1902, he graduated from Santa Clara College, where he was a star pitcher.

Keefe started his professional baseball career with the Sacramento Senators in 1903, the first year of the Pacific Coast League (PCL). The following year, the Sacramento franchise moved to Tacoma, Washington, and Keefe spent two seasons with the Tacoma Tigers. In 1904, he had 438.2 innings pitched, a win–loss record of 34–15, and a 2.40 earned run average (ERA). He had the second-most wins in the PCL and helped the Tigers win the league championship. In 1905, Keefe had 468.2 innings pitched and went 30–22 with a 1.61 ERA. He had the second-most wins in the PCL again.

Keefe then played for the Montreal Royals of the Eastern League from 1906 to 1910. In 1907, he also played for the American League's New York Highlanders. Keefe had 57.2 innings pitched, a 3–5 record, and a 2.50 ERA during his first major league season.

In 1911, Keefe made it back to the majors with the National League's Cincinnati Reds. He had his best season in MLB in 1911, going 12–13 with a 2.69 ERA in 234.1 innings pitched. The following year, he went 1–3 with a 5.24 ERA in 68.2 innings pitched and never played in the majors again.

Keefe played in the minor leagues from 1913 to 1915 and again in 1921 before leaving professional baseball.

== Later life ==
While playing for the Cincinnati Reds, Keefe met Margaret Carroll, who later became his wife. The couple raised four children: Helen Roberta Keefe, Carol B. Keefe, Robert Gael Keefe, and John Franklin Keefe.

After his baseball career ended, Keefe returned to the Folsom area, where he worked for the Natomas Gold Dredging Company. He later became the county assessor for East Sacramento County. For several years, he was in charge of the water system for the Folsom area. For 11 years, he served as the postmaster for the city of Folsom, retiring in 1956. He retired to the Land Park section of Sacramento.

Keefe died at his home on December 5, 1964 after a lengthy illness. His funeral was held on the morning of December 9 in Folsom and he was buried at St. John's Catholic Cemetery.
