= Ike Butler =

American baseball player (1873–1948)

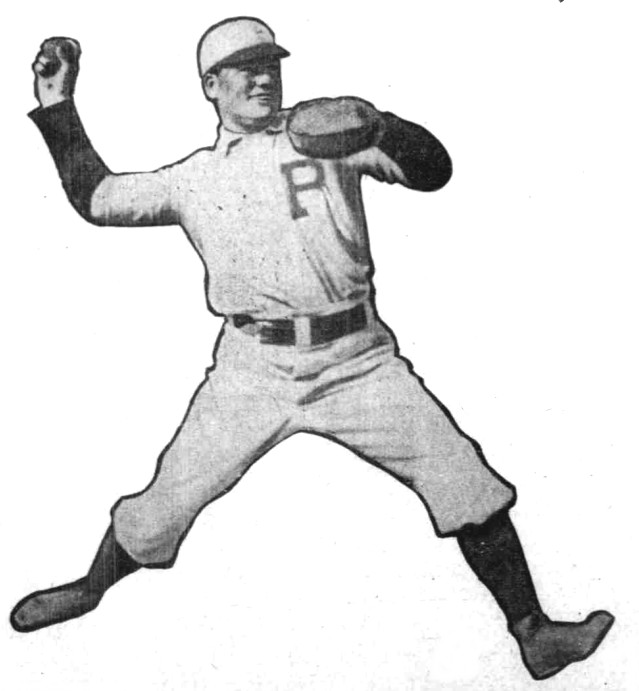
- Pitcher
- Born: August 22, 1873; Langston, Michigan, U.S.
- Died: March 17, 1948 (aged 74); Oakland, California, U.S.
- Batted: Unknown Threw: Right

MLB debut
- August 5, 1902, for the Baltimore Orioles

Last MLB appearance
- September 29, 1902, for the Baltimore Orioles

MLB statistics
- Win–loss record: 1–10
- Earned run average: 5.34
- Strikeouts: 13
- Stats at Baseball Reference

Teams
- Baltimore Orioles (1902)

Isaac Burr Butler (August 22, 1873 – March 17, 1948) was an American Major League Baseball pitcher. Butler played for the Baltimore Orioles in 1902. In 16 career games, he had a 1–10 record, with a 5.34 ERA. He threw right-handed.
