= Ham Hyatt =

American baseball player (1884–1963)

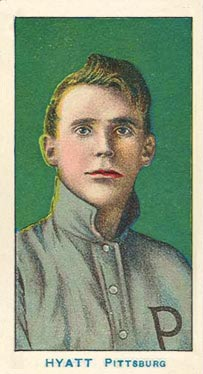
- First baseman / Outfielder
- Born: November 1, 1884; Buncombe County, North Carolina, U.S.
- Died: September 11, 1963 (aged 78); Liberty Lake, Washington, U.S.
- Batted: Left Threw: Right

MLB debut
- April 15, 1909, for the Pittsburgh Pirates

Last MLB appearance
- September 2, 1918, for the New York Yankees

MLB statistics
- Batting average: .267
- Home runs: 10
- Runs batted in: 146
- Stats at Baseball Reference

Teams
- Pittsburgh Pirates (1909–1910, 1912–1914); St. Louis Cardinals (1915); New York Yankees (1918)

Career highlights and awards
- World Series champion (1909)

Robert Hamilton Hyatt (November 1, 1884 – September 11, 1963) was an American professional baseball first baseman. He played in Major League Baseball (MLB) from 1909 to 1918 for the Pittsburgh Pirates, St. Louis Cardinals, and New York Yankees.

Hyatt started his professional baseball career with the Vancouver Beavers of the Northwestern League. In 1908, he hit .323 with 15 home runs; he led the league in hits, home runs, and runs scored. He was purchased by the Pittsburgh Pirates after the season.

From 1909 to 1914, Hyatt served mostly as a pinch hitter for the Pirates; Steve Treder of The Hardball Times credits him as baseball's first pinch-hitting specialist. His 181 OPS+ in 1913 is the highest for a single season of any player deployed in this role. Hyatt also had one-year stints playing for the St. Louis Cardinals and the New York Yankees. After his time in the major leagues ended, Hyatt played in the minors. He spent 1920–1923 with the Pacific Coast League's Vernon Tigers, hitting over .300 each year.

Hyatt became a sheriff's deputy in Grays Harbor County, Washington before becoming a Washington State Highway Patrol officer in 1929. He would remain a police officer until 1947. He became ill and was hospitalized in early September 1963 at Deaconess Hospital in Spokane, Washington. He died on September 11, 1963. His funeral would be held at Sacred Heart Catholic Church in Spokane with his funeral at Holy Cross Cemetery, also in Spokane.
