= Tige Reynolds =

American cartoonist

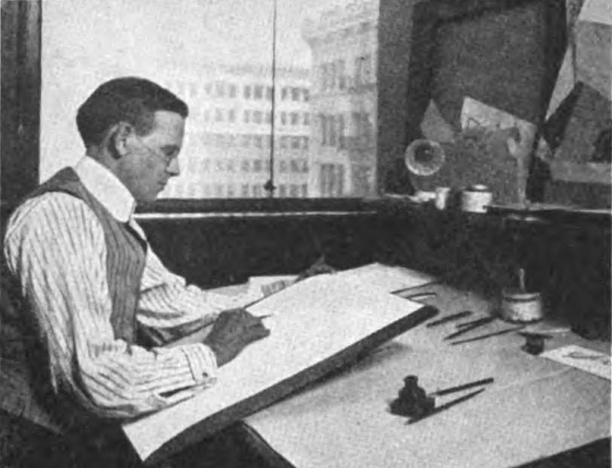

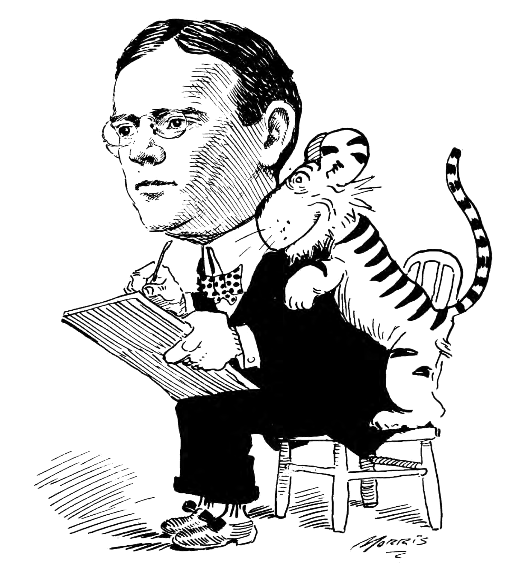
Cartoonist Edward S. "Tige" Reynolds, as seen by William Charles Morris

Edward Samuel "Tige" Reynolds (December 11, 1877 – April 26, 1931) was an American cartoonist, most known for his work in the Portland Oregonian, where he worked from 1911 until his death. Born in Oskaloosa, Iowa, he began his newspaper work in California, and eventually worked for the San Francisco Evening Post, Fresno Evening Democrat, Tacoma Ledger, and the Vancouver Province before settling at the Oregonian.
