= Lou Nordyke =

American baseball player (1876–1945)

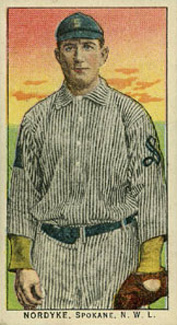
- First baseman
- Born: August 7, 1876; Brighton, Iowa, U.S.
- Died: September 27, 1945 (aged 69); Los Angeles, California, U.S.
- Batted: Right Threw: Right

MLB debut
- April 18, 1906, for the St. Louis Browns

Last MLB appearance
- June 27, 1906, for the St. Louis Browns

MLB statistics
- Games played: 25
- Hits: 13
- Batting average: .245
- Stats at Baseball Reference

Teams
- St. Louis Browns (1906)

Louis Ellis Nordyke (August 7, 1876 – September 27, 1945) was an American Major League Baseball first baseman who played for the St. Louis Browns for one season, from April 18 to June 27, 1906. He was sold to the Browns by the Tacoma Tigers of the Pacific Coast League, after having previously been on their Champion 1904–1905 team. He was a popular player with both fans and his fellow players in 1903, when he played for the Spokane Indians, also of the PCL. Nordyke later rejoined the team in 1909, and won the league's batting championship. He also played for the 1907 St. Paul Saints. In total, Nordyke played professional baseball from 1901 to 1914.

After his baseball career, he spent time as a security guard at a bank. Nordyke died at the age of 69, of a heart attack in Los Angeles. His remains were cremated and interred at Forest Lawn Memorial Park in Glendale, California.
