= Buck Stanley =

American baseball player (1889-1940)

- Pitcher
- Born: November 13, 1889; Washington, D.C., U.S.
- Died: August 13, 1940 (aged 50); Norfolk, Virginia, U.S.
- Batted: Left Threw: Left

MLB debut
- September 12, 1911, for the Philadelphia Phillies

Last MLB appearance
- October 9, 1911, for the Philadelphia Phillies

MLB statistics
- Games played: 4
- Innings pitched: 11.1
- Earned run average: 6.35
- Stats at Baseball Reference

Teams
- Philadelphia Phillies (1911)

John Leonard "Buck" Stanley (November 13, 1889 – August 13, 1940) was an American pitcher in Major League Baseball. He played for the Philadelphia Phillies in 1911.
