= Pug Bennett =

American baseball player (1874–1935)

- Second baseman
- Born: February 20, 1874; Ponca, Nebraska, U.S.
- Died: September 12, 1935 (aged 61); Kirkland, Washington, U.S.
- Batted: Left Threw: Right

MLB debut
- April 12, 1906, for the St. Louis Cardinals

Last MLB appearance
- September 20, 1907, for the St. Louis Cardinals

MLB statistics
- Batting average: .248
- Home runs: 1
- Runs batted in: 55
- Stats at Baseball Reference

Teams
- St. Louis Cardinals (1906–1907)

Justin Titus "Pug" Bennett (February 20, 1874 – September 12, 1935) was an American second baseman in Major League Baseball (MLB). He was the starting second baseman for the St. Louis Cardinals throughout the 1906 season, as well as for part of the 1907 campaign. Bennett went to Blackburn College.

== Professional career ==
Bennett made his professional debut for Kokomo/Mattoon for the Illinois/Indiana league in 1899. However, much of his statistical information is incomplete. Bennett would toil in the minor leagues for the next several seasons, spending time with Toledo of the Interstate League, then moving on to the Southern Association, in which he spent the majority of his career, playing for the Shreveport Giants and New Orleans Pelicans in 1902. He played the 1903 season for the Atlanta Crackers. In 1904, his journeyman career continued as he applied his craft for the Nashville Volunteers. While Bennett was quality hitter, batting over .300 for many of his previous seasons, his late start in baseball was working against him. He did not make his professional debut until he was 25. In 1905, Bennett was 31 years old playing for the Seattle Siwashes of the Pacific Coast League. Despite the team having players like Rube Vickers and Bill Kemmer that had major league experience, the Siwashes were the worst team in the league, finishing in last place. Bennett would be rewarded as his contract was purchased by the St. Louis Cardinals of the National League. However, the Cardinals were a terrible team managed by John McCloskey, who was given the job despite having a losing record as a manager.

Bennett, who had been a prolific hitter in the minors, could only muster a .248 batting average over two season. However, he was the Cardinals' starting second baseman during his only two years in the major leagues. He was replaced by Billy Gilbert, who like Bennett was a journeyman player on the south side of 30. Bennett returned to the minor leagues, never again to reach the majors. At 34, he returned to Seattle, only to play for the Turks of the Northwestern League. In 1917, at the age of 43, Bennett pulled the plug on his career, retiring after playing for the Vancouver Beavers.
