= Bill Leard =

American baseball player (1885-1970)

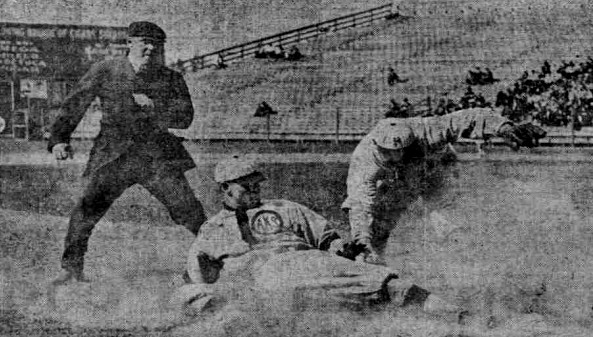
- Leard slides into third
- Second baseman
- Born: October 14, 1885; Oneida, New York, U.S.
- Died: January 15, 1970 (aged 84); San Francisco, California, U.S.
- Batted: Right Threw: Right

MLB debut
- July 21, 1917, for the Brooklyn Robins

Last MLB appearance
- July 25, 1917, for the Brooklyn Robins

MLB statistics
- Batting average: .000
- Home runs: 0
- Runs batted in: 0
- Stats at Baseball Reference

Teams
- Brooklyn Robins (1917)

William Wallace Leard (October 14, 1885 in Oneida, New York – January 15, 1970 in San Francisco, California), nicknamed "Wild Bill", was an American former professional baseball player who played second base in three games for the 1917 Brooklyn Robins.

He was later a minor league manager from 1917 to 1927.
