= Victoria Tyees =

Canadian minor league baseball team

The Victoria Tyees were a minor league baseball team based in Victoria, British Columbia. They originally played in the Class B level Northwest International League in 1919. From 1952 to 1954, a team of the same name played in the Class A level Western International League. In 1954, they were affiliated with the Portland Beavers. They played their home games at Royal Athletic Park.

== Notable players ==
- Jim Clark, Dain Clay, Cecil Garriott, Jay Heard, Eddie Lake, Steve Mesner and Neill Sheridan played for the team.
