= Emil Frisk =

American baseball player (1874–1922)

- Outfielder
- Born: October 15, 1874; Kalkaska, Michigan, US
- Died: January 27, 1922 (aged 47); Seattle, Washington, US
- Batted: Left Threw: Right

MLB debut
- September 2, 1899, for the Cincinnati Reds

Last MLB appearance
- April 23, 1907, for the St. Louis Browns

MLB statistics
- Batting average: .267
- Home runs: 4
- Runs batted in: 45
- Stats at Baseball Reference

Teams
- Cincinnati Reds (1899); Detroit Tigers (1901); St. Louis Browns (1905, 1907)

John Emil Frisk (October 15, 1874 – January 27, 1922) was a pitcher and outfielder in Major League Baseball. He played for the Cincinnati Reds, Detroit Tigers, and St. Louis Browns. Frisk also had a long career in the minor leagues, where he won three batting titles and became the first minor league baseball player to accumulate over 2,000 career hits.

== Career ==
Frisk was born in Kalkaska, Michigan. After playing for semiprofessional teams, he started his organized baseball career in 1898, as a pitcher. That season, he went 14-3 with a 2.79 earned run average for the Canadian League's Hamilton Hams. He also batted .311. In 1899, he went to the Detroit Tigers of the Western League before being purchased by the Cincinnati Reds in August. He went 3-6 for Cincinnati and was then returned to Detroit. In 1900, Frisk went 6-9. The Western League had become the American League, and 1901 was its first year as a "major" league. Frisk hit .313 early that season, but had a mediocre record as a pitcher and was released in July.

Frisk then spent 1901 to 1903 with the Denver Grizzlies of the new Western League. During this period, he converted into a full-time outfielder. In 1902, he had his breakout season, batting .373 with 14 home runs and leading the league in both categories. His slugging percentage was .618. It had been a smooth transition from pitching, but in 1903 Frisk slumped down to .273 and subsequently moved to the Pacific Coast League. In 1904, he batted .336 with the Seattle Siwashes to win another batting championship. He was drafted by the St. Louis Browns that fall.

Frisk's only full season in Major League Baseball was 1905. He hit .261 with three home runs; those were not impressive numbers, but they were not bad for that era. Frisk's OPS+ was over 100. His fielding percentage was below average, however, and he went back down to the minor leagues in 1906. He bounced from the American Association's St. Paul Saints to the Browns in both 1906 and 1907 and played his last major league game on April 23, 1907. In 158 career major league games, Frisk had 135 hits. He then spent most of the next decade in the Northwestern League.

In 1908, Frisk rejoined the Seattle Siwashes. He batted just .264 that season, but then increased his average to .307 in 1909, which ranked him second in the batting race. He played for the Spokane Indians in 1910 and 1911, and he moved around from Spokane, Seattle, and the Vancouver Beavers from 1912 to 1915. He won his third and final batting title in 1914, when he hit at a .320 clip. That season, he became the first baseball player in history to get 2,000 hits in the minor leagues.

Nicknamed the "Wagner of the minors", Frisk was a consistent hitter. He hit safely over 120 times in every season from 1906 to 1914. In 1915, at the age of 40, he batted .272 and then retired from baseball. He finished his career with a .301 average in the minors. In 2003, baseball writer Bill James named him as the best minor league player of the 1900–1909 decade.

Frisk worked as a carpenter in the off seasons, and after his baseball days, he worked as a table operator for the Pacific Coast Company. He had a wife and one son.

Frisk died in Seattle in 1922.
