= Gus Thompson =

American baseball player (1877–1958)

- Pitcher
- Born: June 22, 1877; Humboldt, Iowa, U.S.
- Died: March 28, 1958 (aged 80); Kalispell, Montana, U.S.
- Batted: Right Threw: Right

MLB debut
- August 31, 1903, for the Pittsburgh Pirates

Last MLB appearance
- September 21, 1906, for the St. Louis Cardinals

MLB statistics
- Win–loss record: 4–13
- Earned run average: 4.07
- Strikeouts: 58
- Stats at Baseball Reference

Teams
- Pittsburgh Pirates (1903); St. Louis Cardinals (1906)

John Gustav Thompson (June 22, 1877 – March 28, 1958) was an American pitcher in Major League Baseball. He played for the Pittsburgh Pirates and St. Louis Cardinals.

After his professional baseball career ended, Thompson moved to Kalispell, Montana around 1909 with his wife who was from Kalispell and remained there until his death nearly 50 years later in 1958. He was called "the father of baseball in Kalispell". He ran a pool hall, cigar store and a sports bar.
