= Billy Hulen =

American baseball player (1870–1947)

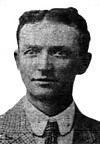
- Shortstop
- Born: March 12, 1870; Dixon, California, U.S.
- Died: October 2, 1947 (aged 77); Santa Rosa, California, U.S.
- Batted: Left Threw: Left

MLB debut
- May 2, 1896, for the Philadelphia Phillies

Last MLB appearance
- May 12, 1899, for the Washington Senators

MLB statistics
- Batting average: .246
- Home runs: 0
- Runs batted in: 41
- Stats at Baseball Reference

Teams
- Philadelphia Phillies (1896); Washington Senators (1899)

William Franklin "Kid" Hulen (March 12, 1870 – October 2, 1947) was an American shortstop in Major League Baseball. He played for the Philadelphia Phillies and the Washington Senators. He stood at 5'8" and weighed 148 lbs.

== Career ==
Hulen was born in Dixon, California. He got his start in organized baseball in 1892, for the Los Angeles Seraphs of the California League. In 1895, at the age of 25, Hulen batted .369 for the Western League's Minneapolis Millers. He made his major league debut the following season with the Philadelphia Phillies.

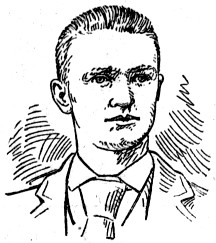
A lithograph of Hulen in 1892.

Hulen batted .265 for Philadelphia. He went back to the Western League for the following two seasons and then returned to the National League in 1899 with the Washington Senators. In 19 games, he batted just .147 and never played in the majors again. Hulen is probably best known for being the last regular left-handed shortstop in MLB history. He also holds the lefty record for the most games played (73 in 1896) at the position.

Hulen played for and managed various minor league teams from 1900 to 1913. He managed future Hall of Famer Joe Tinker in 1900 and later recommended Tinker to the Western League. In 1904, he managed Everett to a league championship.

Hulen was reported missing in February 1906; he had apparently failed to visit his wife in Oregon and could not be located. Foul play was suspected. A year later, he was discovered playing baseball under an assumed name in Medicine Hat, Canada, and his wife then filed for divorce, citing desertion.

Hulen began using his real name again in 1908. He managed in Spokane, Washington; Medicine Hat; and Regina, Saskatchewan over the next several years.

Hulen died in Santa Rosa, California, in 1947. He was buried in Cypress Hill Memorial Park.
