= Aberdeen Black Cats =

- 1903–1918; (1903-1908, 1910, 1912, 1915, 1918); Aberdeen, Washington

Minor league affiliations
- Previous classes: Class B (1915, 1918); Class D (1910, 1912); Class B (1907-1908); Class D (1903-1906)
- League: Pacific Coast International League (1918)
- Previous leagues: Northwestern League (1915); Washington State League (1910, 1912); Northwestern League (1907-1908); Southwest Washington League (1903-1906)

Team data
- Previous names: Aberdeen Black Cats (1910, 1912, 1915, 1918); Aberdeen Grays/Harbor Grays (1908); Aberdeen Black Cats (1907); Aberdeen Pippins (1903-1906)

The Aberdeen Black Cats were a minor league baseball team, based in Aberdeen, Washington that played sporadically in various Washington based leagues between 1903 and 1918.
