= Recreation Park (Vancouver) =

Baseball venue in Vancouver, Canada

Coordinates: 49.27770°N 123.11859°W

Recreation Park in 1907

Recreation Park was a baseball park in Vancouver, British Columbia. It was the home field of the Vancouver Beavers of the Northwestern League from 1905 through 1912.

The field was on a block bounded by Homer Street (northwest, first base); Smithe Street (northeast, third base); Hamilton Street / Mainland Street (southeast, left field); and Nelson Street / Cambie Street (southwest, right field). Coincidentally, that location is about three blocks west-northwest of the eventual site of BC Place.

== History ==
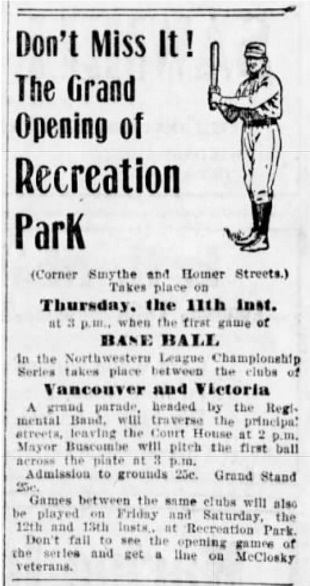
Opening Day ad for Recreation Park

The ballpark was built during a two-month period in the late winter and early spring of 1905. The first game was played on May 11, with Vancouver defeating Victoria 4-2.

Construction began in early March. The location was stated as "between Smithe Street and False Creek, and bound east and west by Cambie [now Nelson] and Homer Streets respectively. The promoters intend to have the finest park in Western Canada." False Creek being some distance away, the southeast border is usually given as Hamilton Street.

The structure was described this way: "The stand will be L-shaped, 75 feet on Smythe [sic] by 70 feet on Homer Street. Another feature will be a raised terrace all round the field. The bleachers will be along Smythe [sic] Street."

On the eve of the scheduled opening, the hype accelerated somewhat, as it was declared "the finest ball park west of Chicago."

In advertisements, the ballpark location was usually given as either "Smythe and Homer Streets" or "Smithe and Homer Streets". (The street is now consistently spelled Smithe.)

The Vancouver Beavers, a charter member of the new league, were moderately successful during their years at Recreation Park. They won the league championship in 1908 and 1911. They would go on to win two more league titles after their move to Athletic Park in 1913.

After the closure of Recreation Park, the lot was cleared and developed. It is now occupied by office buildings, with a small concrete-covered park in the southeast corner, called Yaletown Park.
