= Phil Cooney (baseball) =

American baseball player (1882-1957)

- Third baseman
- Born: September 14, 1882; New York, New York, U.S.
- Died: October 6, 1957 (aged 75); New York, New York, U.S.
- Batted: Left Threw: Right

MLB debut
- September 27, 1905, for the New York Highlanders

Last MLB appearance
- September 27, 1905, for the New York Highlanders

MLB statistics
- Batting average: .000
- Hits: 0
- At-Bats: 3
- Stats at Baseball Reference

Teams
- New York Highlanders (1905)

Philip Clarence Cooney (September 14, 1882 – October 6, 1957) was an American Major League Baseball player. He was a third baseman for the New York Highlanders for one game in the 1905 season. Cooney had no hits in three at-bats.

On June 17, 1917, he was the first Western League player to have an unassisted triple play.

He was born and died in New York, New York, and was Jewish.
