= Seattle Giants =

Minor league baseball team

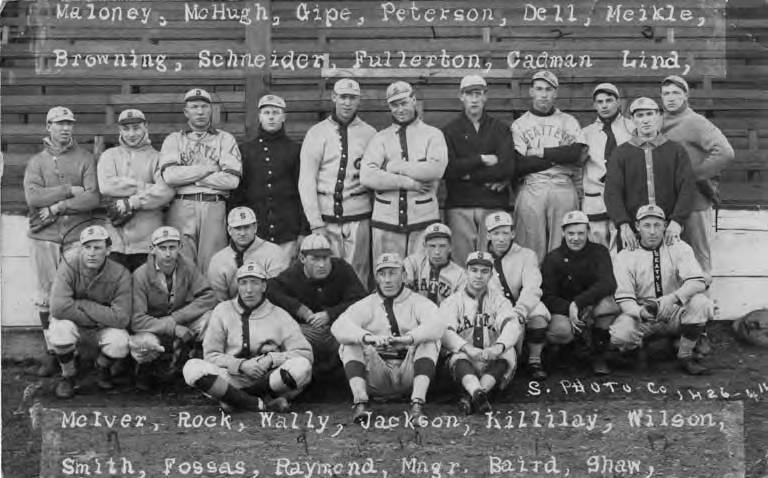
Seattle Giants, 1912

The Seattle Giants were a minor league baseball team that played in various leagues from 1910 to 1920. Based in Seattle, Washington, United States and owned by Dan Dugdale, they played in the Northwestern League from 1910 to 1917, the Pacific Coast International League in 1918 and 1920, and the Northwest International League in 1919. Two of their ballparks were Yesler Way Park and Dugdale Field. In 1919, they were also known as the Seattle Drydockers.
