= Dan Dugdale =

American baseball player and manager (1864–1934)

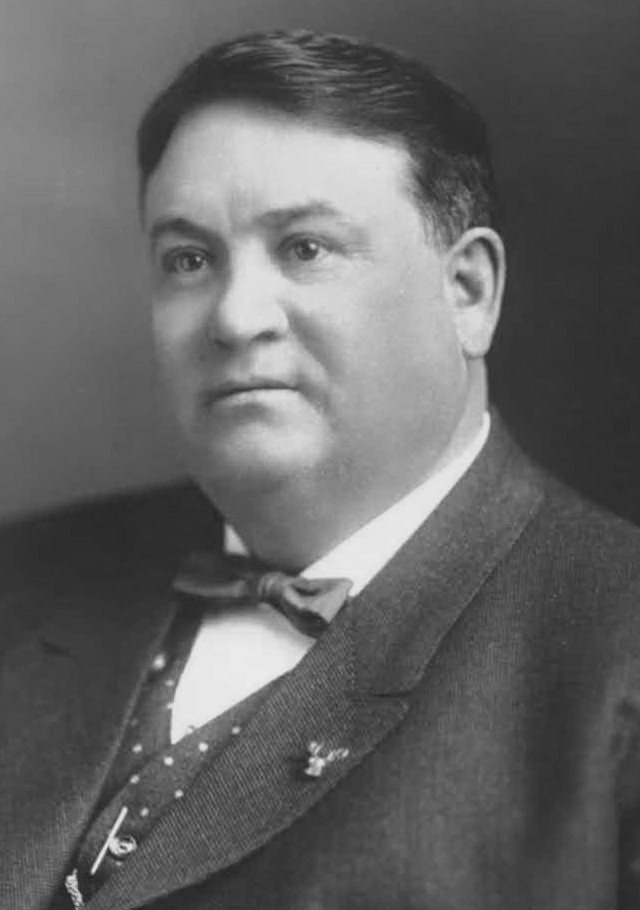
- Catcher
- Born: October 28, 1864; Peoria, Illinois
- Died: March 9, 1934 (aged 69); Seattle, Washington
- Batted: Right Threw: Unknown

MLB debut
- May 20, 1886, for the Kansas City Cowboys

Last MLB appearance
- September 30, 1894, for the Washington Senators

MLB statistics
- Batting average: .224
- Home runs: 0
- Runs batted in: 18
- Stats at Baseball Reference

Teams
- Kansas City Cowboys (1886); Washington Senators (1894)

Daniel Edward Dugdale (October 28, 1864 – March 9, 1934) was a Major League Baseball catcher. He played for the 1886 Kansas City Cowboys and 1894 Washington Senators in the National League. He continued to play ball in the minor leagues through 1897, primarily in the Western Association. He managed in the minors with the Peoria Distillers (player/manager) in 1896-97, Seattle Clamdiggers (1898, 1901–02), Seattle Chinooks (1903), Portland Browns (1904), Seattle Siwashes (1907–08) and Seattle Giants (1911).

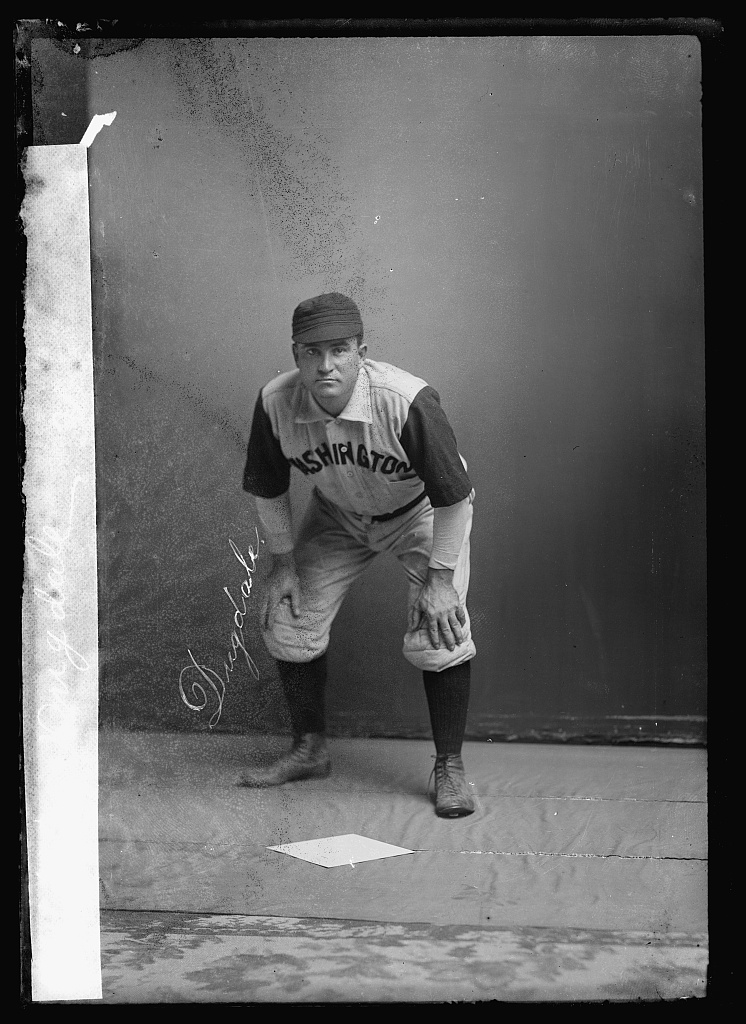
Dan Dugdale Catcher for the Washington Senators

He became involved in Seattle's real estate market and became fairly wealthy. He used his wealth to build several baseball stadiums in the Seattle area. The main stadium in Seattle bore his name until it was destroyed in 1932.

== Sources ==
- Career statistics from Baseball Reference · Baseball Reference (Minors) · Retrosheet · Baseball Almanac
