= Mike Lynch (outfielder) =

American baseball player (1875–1947)

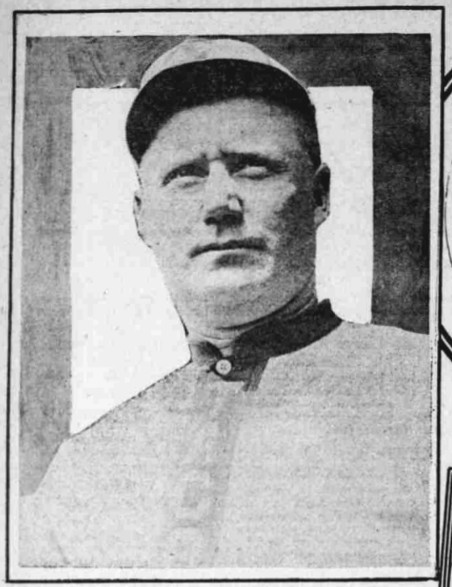
- Outfielder
- Born: September 10, 1875; St. Paul, Minnesota, U.S.
- Died: April 2, 1947 (aged 71); Jennings Lodge, Oregon, U.S.
- Batted: Unknown Threw: Right

MLB debut
- April 24, 1902, for the Chicago Orphans

Last MLB appearance
- May 5, 1902, for the Chicago Orphans

MLB statistics
- Batting average: .143
- Home runs: 0
- Runs batted in: 0
- Stats at Baseball Reference

Teams
- Chicago Orphans (1902)

Michael Joseph Lynch (September 10, 1875 – April 2, 1947) was an American center fielder for the Chicago Orphans baseball team in 1902.

In 1906, Lynch led the Northwestern League in batting average (.355), slugging percentage (.505), hits (130) and home runs (7) as a member of the Tacoma Tigers. Lynch began managing Tacoma in 1906 and held managerial role in the Northwestern League until 1914.

Lynch led the Spokane Indians to a Northwestern League pennant victory in 1909.
