= Vancouver Mounties =

- 1956–1969; (1956–1962, 1965–1969); Vancouver, British Columbia

Minor league affiliations
- Previous classes: Triple-A (1958–1962; 1965–1969); Open (1956–1957)
- League: Pacific Coast League (1956–1962; 1965–1969)

Major league affiliations
- Previous teams: Seattle Pilots and Montreal Expos (1969); Kansas City/Oakland Athletics (1965–1968); Minnesota Twins (1962); Milwaukee Braves (1961); Baltimore Orioles (1956–1960)

Team data
- Previous names: Vancouver Mounties (1956–1962; 1965–1969)
- Previous parks: Capilano Stadium

The Vancouver Mounties were a high-level Minor League Baseball club based in Vancouver, British Columbia, that played in the Pacific Coast League (PCL) from 1956–62 and 1965–69. Its home field was Capilano Stadium. During the Mounties' first two seasons, 1956–57, the PCL still was a member of an experimental organized baseball ranking, the Open Classification, as it made a bid for Major League status. However, in 1958 the PCL reverted to Triple-A when the Dodgers and Giants moved to California.

With their two terms during the 1950s and 1960s, Mounties were the first and second of Vancouver's three Triple-A baseball teams. The city had previously hosted numerous clubs at lower levels, including the Horse Doctors (1905; 1907), Beavers (1908–17 and 1922, although the team was alternatively known as the "Champions" and "Bees" in 1912–13 and 1915), Maple Leafs (1937) and Capilanos (1939–42; 1946–54). The Capilanos, owned by Seattle brewer Emil Sick, were a Western International League farm club of Sick's PCL Seattle Rainiers and named after his Vancouver brewery. Sick also built Capilano Stadium, which opened in 1951.

== History ==
The Mounties were affiliated with a number of Major League Baseball parent clubs: the Baltimore Orioles, Milwaukee Braves, Minnesota Twins, the Athletics of both Kansas City and Oakland, and as a co-op club working with the expansion Seattle Pilots and Montreal Expos in 1969.

The first edition of the Mounties was created after the 1955 season when the Oakland Oaks, a PCL member since 1903, relocated because of falling attendance and a dilapidated home stadium. But the 1956 Mounties, a last-place team, drew only 53,000 fans—almost a third of the Oaks' home gate during their last year in the San Francisco Bay Area. However, a contending team in 1957 caused a spike in attendance to over 300,000 fans, tops in the Pacific Coast League. This pattern continued through 1962: Vancouver fans supported the Mounties during years when they ranked high in the PCL standings, and stayed away when the team was at the bottom.

In 1962, the Mounties finished seventh in the eight-team league in both win–loss record (72–79) and attendance (88,000). During the off-season, massive changes swept the minor leagues. The Triple-A American Association folded its tent completely. Four of the Association's six franchises survived, including the Dallas-Ft. Worth Rangers, which joined the 1963 Pacific Coast League—where it displaced the Mounties and inherited their Twins' affiliation and playing roster.

However, this same franchise would struggle in Dallas in 1964 and return the PCL to Vancouver the following season to become the second edition of the Mounties. Attendance held at between 120,000 and 140,000 fans for competitive, but non-playoff, clubs from 1965 to 1967, but below .500 seasons in both 1968 and 1969 dropped fan support to 83,000, then 63,000 paying customers. In 1970, the club moved to Salt Lake City and became the Angels.

Vancouver was without professional baseball in the 1970s until 1978, when it received an expansion PCL franchise, the Vancouver Canadians, owned by Harry Ornest. After 22 seasons, the club moved south after 1999 to Sacramento and became the River Cats. They were immediately replaced by the current Canadians franchise in 2000, in the High-A (formerly Class-A short season) Northwest League.

== Notable alumni ==
- George Bamberger, manager and longtime MLB pitching coach
- Sal Bando, All-Star third baseman
- Jim Bouton, pitcher, author of landmark book Ball Four; his two-week stint with the club in April 1969 forms part of the book
- Ed Charles, third baseman, 1969 "Miracle Mets'
- Pat Gillick, Hall of Fame executive
- Bobby Knoop, All-Star second baseman
- Tony La Russa, Hall of Fame manager who racked up over 2,900 wins in 35 MLB seasons
- Charley Lau, influential hitting coach
- Denis Menke, All-Star shortstop
- Lefty O'Doul, manager; at age 59, during his term as skipper of the 1956 Mounties, O'Doul (who batted .349 in 970 MLB games over 11 seasons), tripled as a pinch hitter in his lone at bat — the last hit of his baseball career
- Blue Moon Odom, All-Star pitcher
- Brooks Robinson, Hall of Fame third baseman

== Yearly record ==
Year	Record	Finish Full Season	Attendance	Manager	Postseason
1956	67–98	Eighth	52,893	Lefty O'Doul	No playoffs held
1957	97–70	Second	306,145	Charlie Metro	No playoffs held
1958	79–73	Third	245,590	Charlie Metro	No playoffs held
1968	82–69	Second	238,970	Charlie Metro	No playoffs held
1960	68–84	Seventh	144,278	George Staller	No playoffs held
1961	87–67	Second	200,143	Billy Hitchcock	No playoffs held
1962	72–79	Seventh	88,075	Jack McKeon	No playoffs held
1965	77–69	Third (West Division)	124,048	Haywood Sullivan; Bobby Hofman	DNQ
1966	77–71	Second (West Division)	121,482	Mickey Vernon	DNQ
1967	77–69	Third (West Division)	143,541	Mickey Vernon	DNQ
1968	58–88	Sixth (West Division)	82,028	Mickey Vernon	DNQ
1969	77–71	Second (tied) (North Division)	62,666	Bob Lemon	DNQ

== See also ==
- Vancouver Beavers
- Vancouver Canadians
