= Vancouver Beavers =

The Vancouver Beavers were a Class-B minor league baseball team based in Vancouver, British Columbia that played on and off from 1908 to 1922. The team played in the Northwestern League, Pacific Coast International League, Northwest International League and Western International League. In early years, their games were staged at Recreation Park. From 1913 on, they played their home games at Athletic Park.

In 1910, Bob Brown bought a 60% share of the team for $500. He moved to Vancouver, British Columbia, Canada to take on the role of the team's playing manager. While Brown owned the Beavers, manager Kitty Brashier guided the team to Northwestern League championships in 1911; the Beavers were also champions in 1913 and 1914, while the team was second in the league in 1912.

Later Chicago Cubs pitcher Walter "Dutch" Ruether pitched for the Beavers in 1914-15. Carl Mays, famous for throwing at batters, also played several seasons with the Beavers. Other members of the club included Chief Meyers, Dave Bancroft, Wimpy Quinn, Mose Solomon, and Bill Sayles. Hall of Fame baseball pitcher Joe McGinnity played for the team in 1918.
