= List of Nashville Sounds team records =

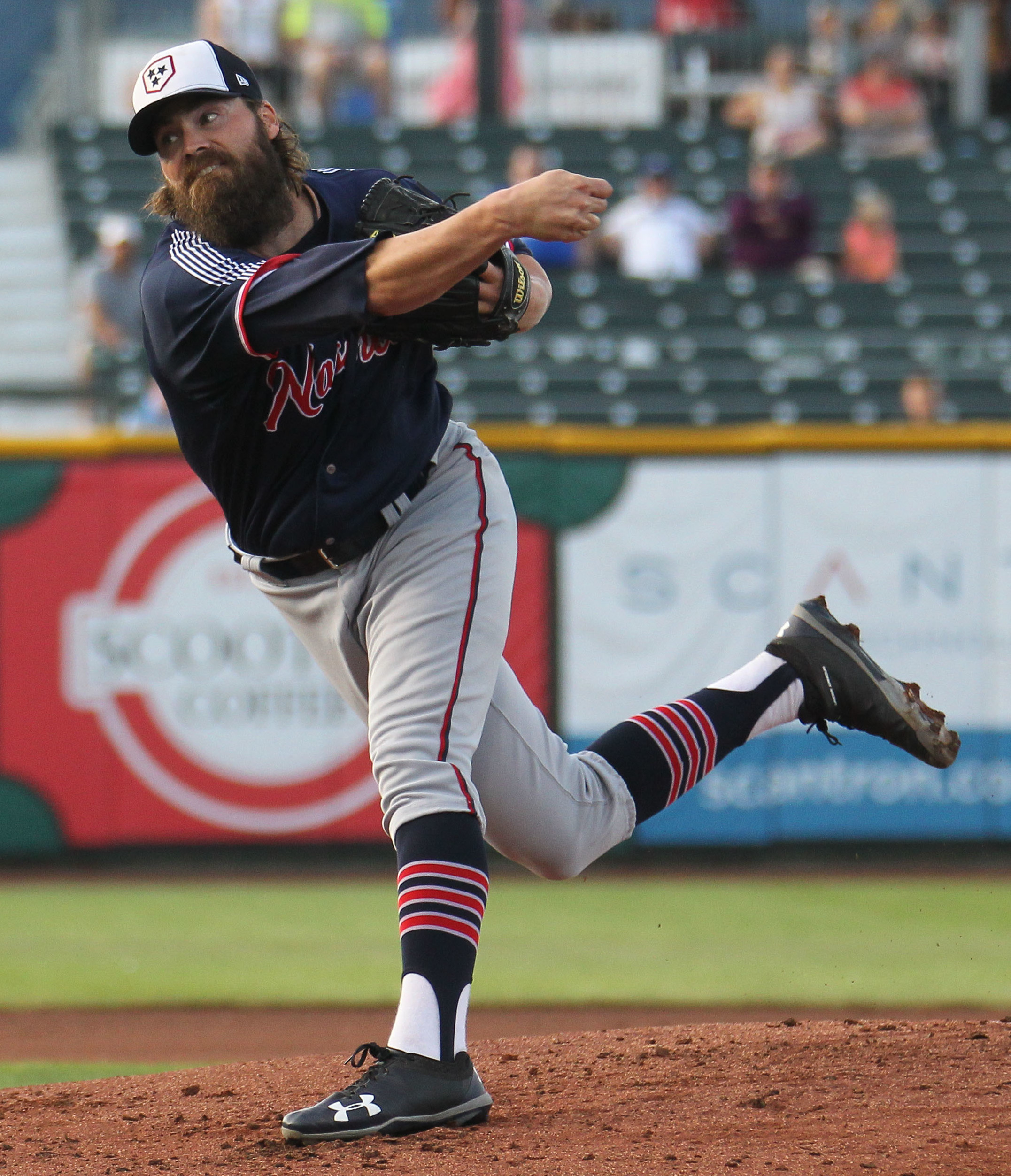
Tim Dillard is the Sounds' career leader in wins (48), games pitched (242), innings pitched (710), and strikeouts (437).

The Nashville Sounds Minor League Baseball team has played in Nashville, Tennessee, since being established in 1978 as an expansion team of the Double-A Southern League. They moved up to Triple-A in 1985 as members of the American Association, joined the Pacific Coast League in 1998, and were placed in the Triple-A East in 2021 before it was renamed the International League in 2022. In the history of the franchise, numerous players and teams have set records in various statistical areas during single games, entire seasons, or their Sounds careers.

Of the nine Sounds who hold the 19 career records tracked by the team, Tim Dillard holds the most, with seven. He is followed by Skeeter Barnes and Chad Hermansen, with three each; and Keith Brown, Mark Corey, Hugh Kemp, Otis Nixon, Tike Redman, and Joey Wendle, with one apiece. Including single-season and single-game records, Dillard holds the most franchise records, with eight. He is followed by Jamie Werly, with six; and Steve Balboni and Skeeter Barnes, who hold four records each.

Combined, the team and individual players hold 30 league records: 13 in the Southern League, one in the American Association, and 16 in the Pacific Coast League. Individual players hold five Southern League, one American Association, and two Pacific Coast League records. The franchise set the Southern League season attendance record in 1980 and the single-game attendance record in 1982. Many of the Pacific Coast League records were set on May 5–6, 2006, when the Sounds participated in a 24-inning game against the New Orleans Zephyrs, which matched the longest game, in terms of innings played, in the league's history.

== Key ==
Key
*	Tie between two or more players/teams
§	Southern League record
‡	American Association record
†	Pacific Coast League record

== Individual career records ==
These are records of players who lead in distinct statistical categories over their careers with the Sounds.

=== Career batting ===
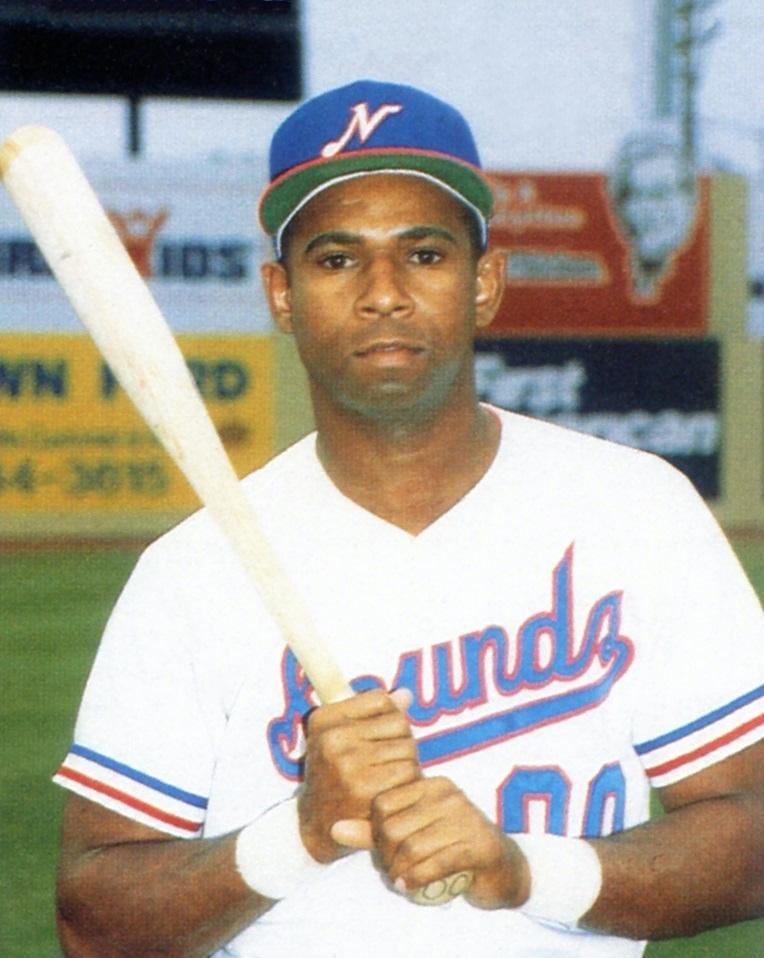
Skeeter Barnes is the career leader in games played (514), at bats (1,848), and hits (517).

Individual career batting records
Statistic	Player	Record	Sounds career	Ref.
Games played	Skeeter Barnes	514	1979, 1988–1990	
At bats	Skeeter Barnes	1,848	1979, 1988–1990	
Runs	Chad Hermansen	303	1998–2002	
Hits	Skeeter Barnes	517	1979, 1988–1990	
Doubles	Joey Wendle	102	2015–2017	
Triples	Tike Redman	32	2000–2003, 2009	
Home runs	Chad Hermansen	92	1998–2002	
Runs batted in	Chad Hermansen	286	1998–2002	
Stolen bases	Otis Nixon	133	1981–1982	

=== Career pitching ===
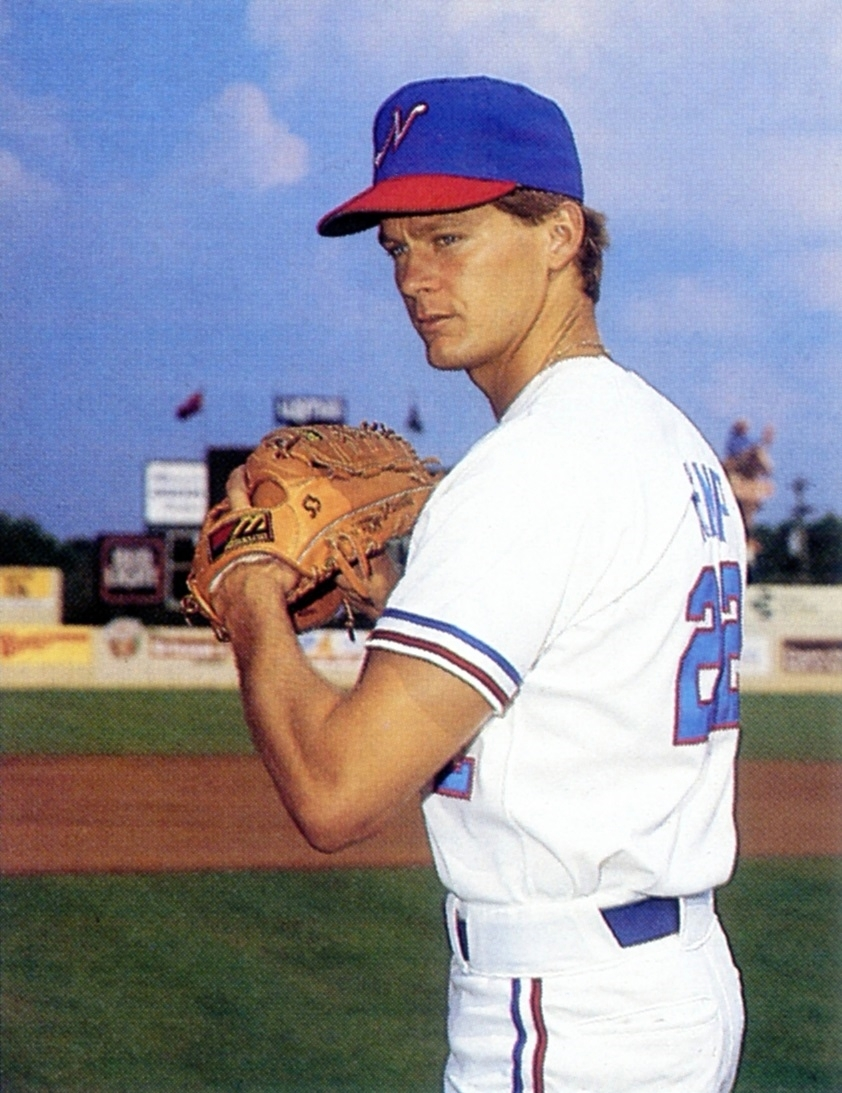
Hugh Kemp is the career leader in games started (73).

Individual career pitching records
Statistic	Player	Record	Sounds career	Ref.
Wins	Tim Dillard	48	2007–2014, 2019	
Losses	Keith Brown	38	1988–1992	
Games pitched	Tim Dillard	242	2007–2014, 2019	
Games started	Hugh Kemp	73	1987–1989	
Saves	Mark Corey	46	2003–2004	
Innings pitched	Tim Dillard	710	2007–2014, 2019	
Runs allowed	Tim Dillard	395	2007–2014, 2019	
Home runs allowed	Tim Dillard	62	2007–2014, 2019	
Walks	Tim Dillard	233	2007–2014, 2019	
Strikeouts	Tim Dillard	437	2007–2014, 2019	

== Individual single-season records ==
These are records of individual players who lead in distinct statistical categories over a single season.

=== Single-season batting ===
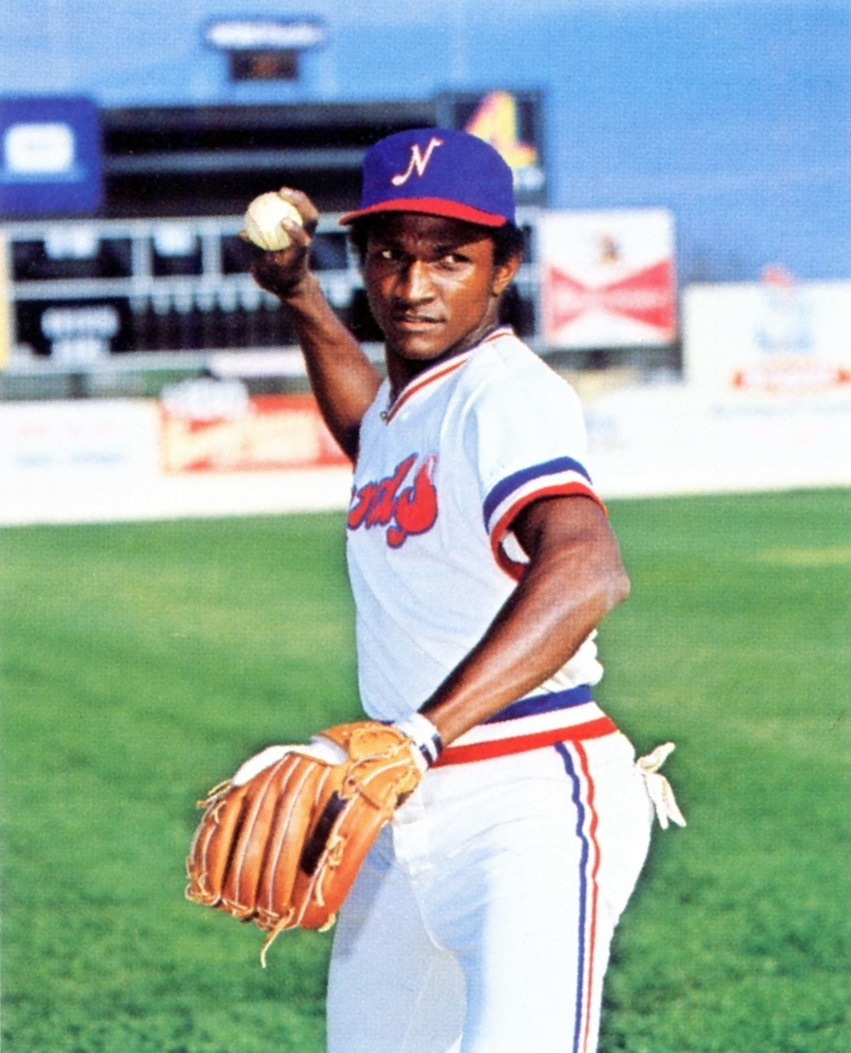
Otis Nixon set the single-season stolen bases record (72) in 1981.

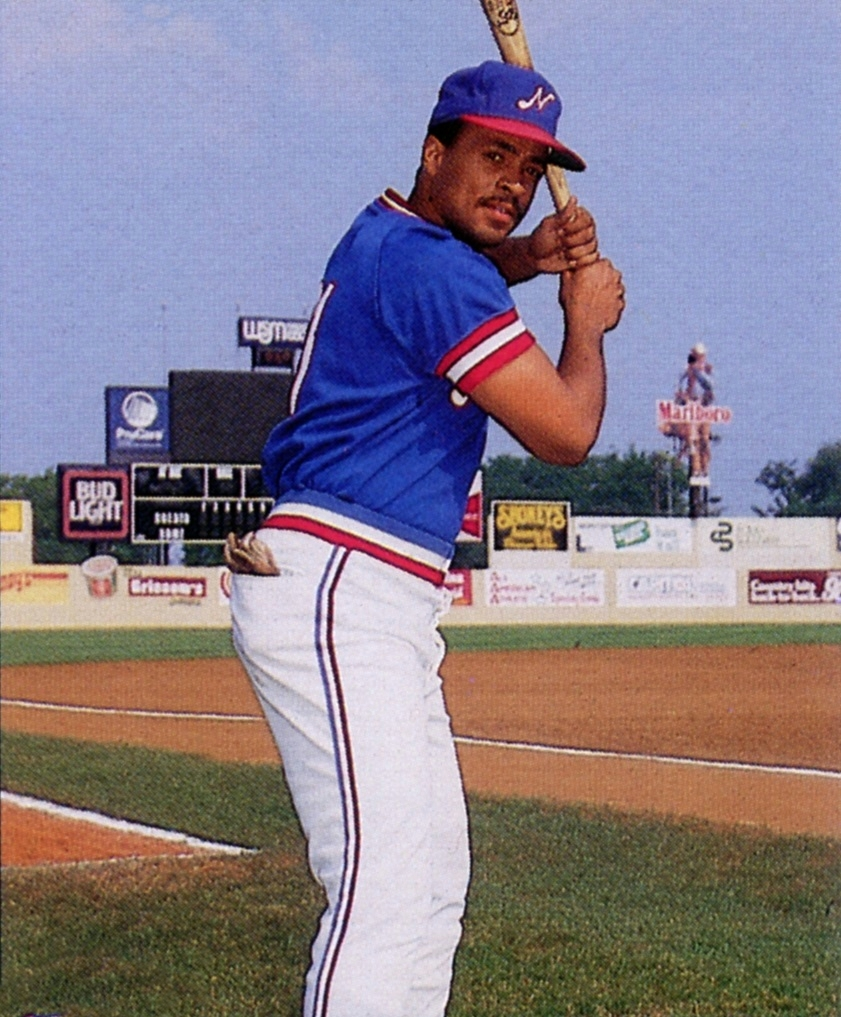
Bruce Fields set the single-season batting average record (.368) in 1986.

Individual single-season batting records
Statistic	Player	Record	Season	Ref.
Batting average	Bruce Fields	.368	1986	
Games played	Skeeter Barnes	145*	1979	
Games played	Gene Menees	145*	1979	
At bats	Norberto Martin	580	1993	
Runs	Ted Wilborn	106	1981	
Hits	Norberto Martin	179	1993	
Total bases	Steve Balboni	288*	1980	
Total bases	Brian Dayett	288*	1982	
Doubles	Joey Wendle	42	2015	
Triples	Jorge Mateo	16	2018	
Home runs	Steve Balboni	34*	1980	
Home runs	Brian Dayett	34*	1982	
Runs batted in	Steve Balboni	122	1980	
Sacrifice hits	Alcides Escobar	19	2009	
Sacrifice flies	Nate Chapman	9*	1982	
Sacrifice flies	Iván Cruz	9*	1999	
Sacrifice flies	Mendy López	9*	2002	
Sacrifice flies	Steve Lombardozzi Jr.	9*	2018	
Sacrifice flies	Brock Wilken	9*	2026	
Hit by pitch	Drew Denson	35	1994	
Walks	Jon Singleton	117	2022	
Strikeouts	Sheldon Neuse	172	2018	
Stolen bases	Otis Nixon	72	1981	

=== Single-season pitching ===
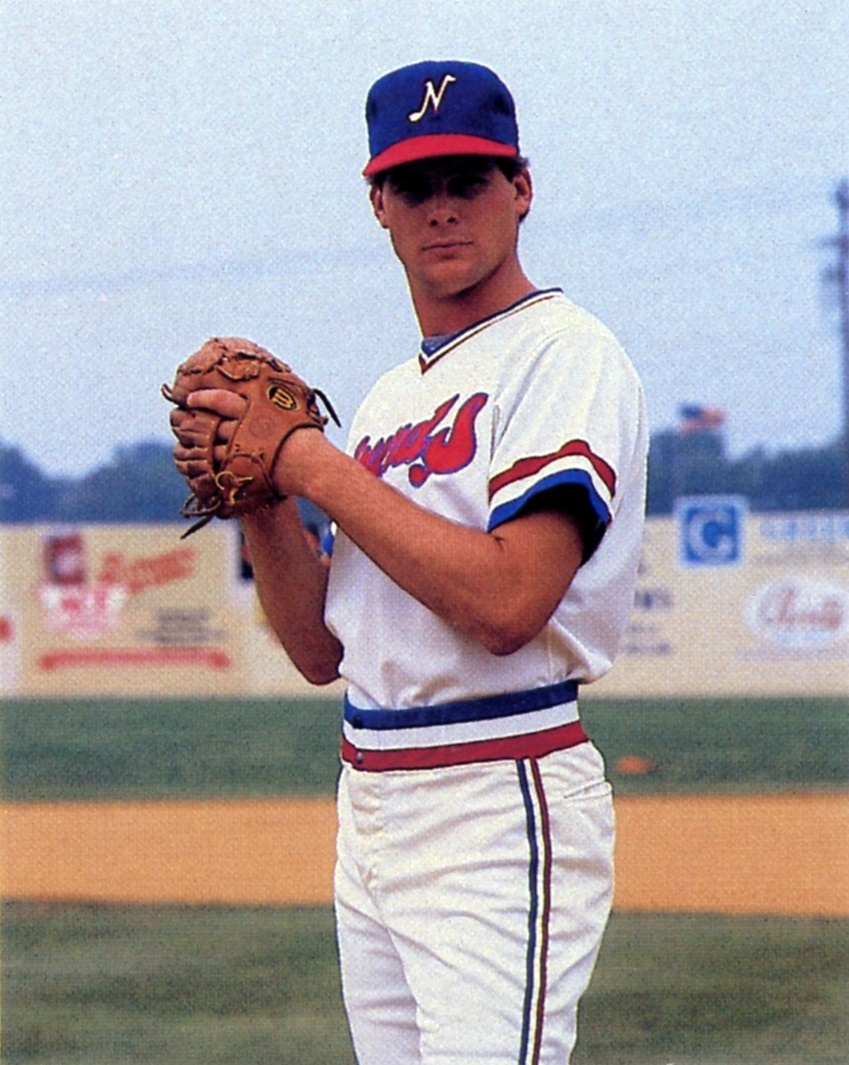
Clay Christiansen (shown) and Stefan Wever tied for the single-season wins record (16) in 1982.

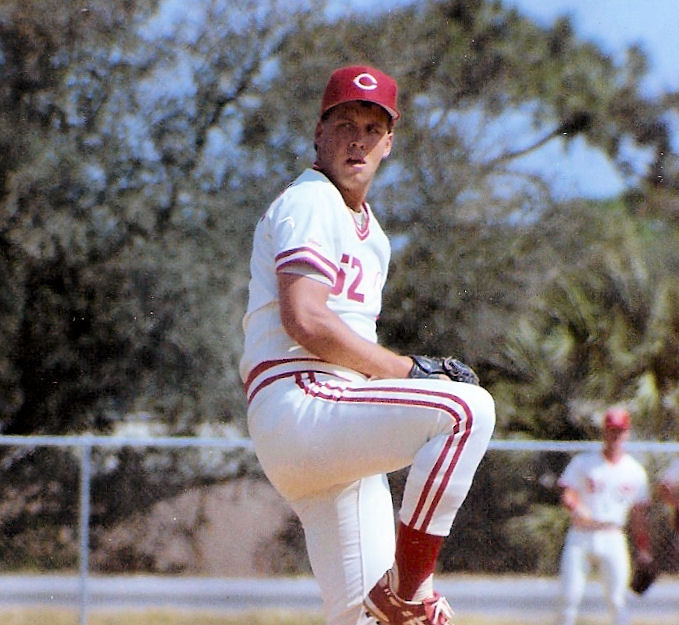
Chris Hammond set the single-season earned run average record (2.17) in 1990.

Individual single-season pitching records
Statistic	Player	Record	Season	Ref.
Wins	Clay Christiansen	16*	1982	
Wins	Stefan Wever	16*	1982	
Losses	Zach Kroenke	16	2013	
Earned run average	Chris Hammond	2.17	1990	
Games pitched	Geoff Combe	66	1978	
Games started	Ben Callahan	29*	1982	
Games started	Clay Christiansen	29*	1982	
Games started	Stefan Wever	29*	1982	
Games started	Luis Vasquez	29*	1989	
Games started	Rodney Imes	29*	1990	
Complete games	Jamie Werly	18	1981	
Saves	Mark Corey	30	2003	
Innings pitched	Jamie Werly	222 1/3	1981	
Runs allowed	Ben Callahan	109	1982	
Earned runs	Tony McKnight	102	2002	
Home runs allowed	James Baldwin	27*	1995	
Home runs allowed	Jeff Housman	27*	2005	
Hit batsmen	Tim Dillard	20	2019	
Walks	Mike Bertotti	105	1997	
Strikeouts	Jamie Werly	193	1981	
Wild pitches	Clay Christiansen	18	1982	

== Individual single-game records ==
These are records of individual players who lead in distinct statistical categories for a single game.

=== Single-game batting ===
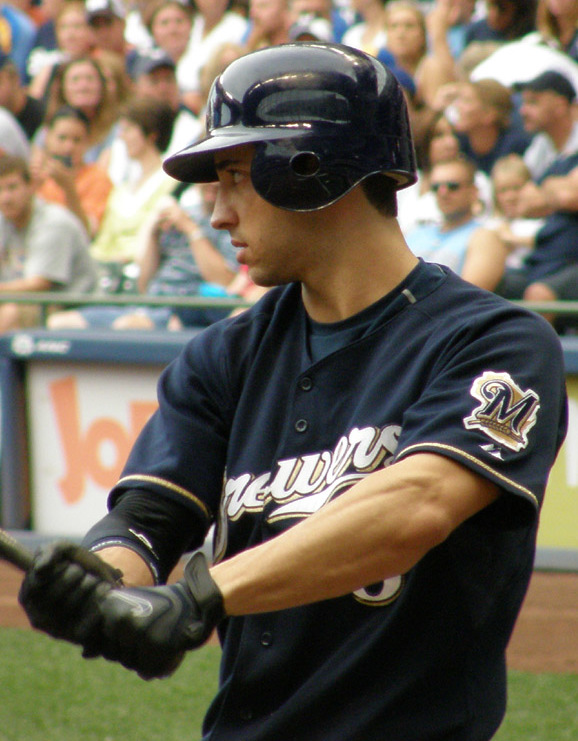
Ryan Braun hit 3 home runs on April 14, 2007.

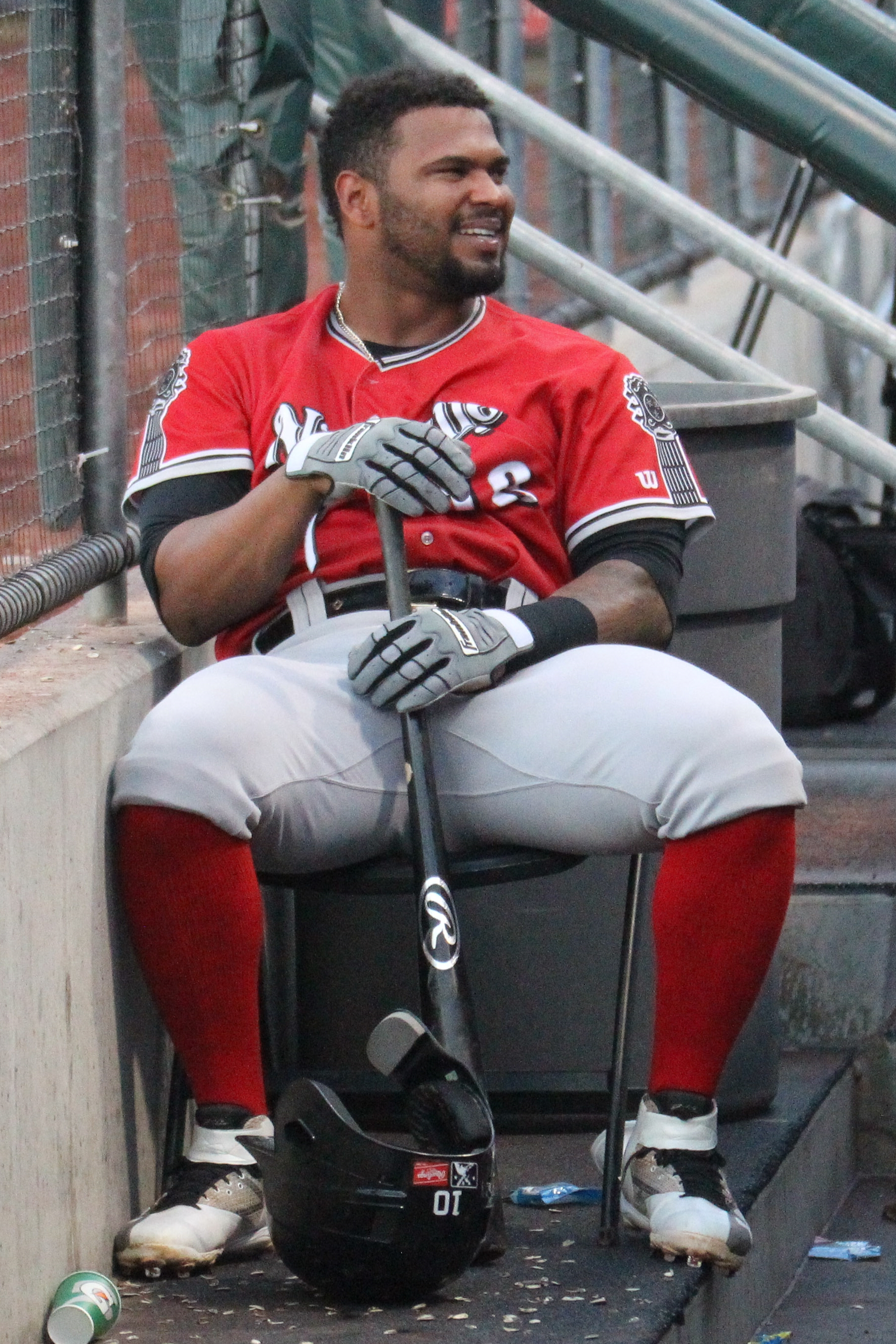
Anthony García collected 8 RBI on July 17, 2018.

Individual single-game batting records
Statistic	Player	Record	Date	Opponent
At bats	Chris Barnwell	11	May 5, 2006	New Orleans Zephyrs
Runs	Adrian Brown	5*	May 12, 1999	Tucson Sidewinders
Runs	Erick Almonte	5*	July 5, 2011	Memphis Redbirds
Runs	Taylor Green	5*	July 28, 2011	Oklahoma City RedHawks
Hits	Various (8 players)	5*	Various (8 occasions)	—
Doubles	Tim Laker	4	August 30, 1998	New Orleans Zephyrs
Triples	Various (13 players)	2*	Various (13 occasions)	—
Home runs	Steve Balboni	3*	May 1, 1980	Knoxville Blue Jays
Home runs	Dan Pasqua	3*	September 3, 1984	Memphis Chicks
Home runs	Darnell Coles	3*	April 10, 1992	Denver Zephyrs
Home runs	Craig Wilson	3*	June 6, 2000	Tucson Sidewinders
Home runs	Ryan Braun	3*	April 14, 2007	New Orleans Zephyrs
Home runs	Russell Branyan	3*	May 16, 2008	New Orleans Zephyrs
Home runs	Matt Chapman	3*	September 3, 2016	New Orleans Zephyrs
Home runs	Luke Adams	3*	June 21, 2026	Memphis Redbirds
Runs batted in	Anthony García	8	July 17, 2018	Omaha Storm Chasers
Stolen bases	Esteury Ruiz	5	September 14, 2022	Jacksonville Jumbo Shrimp
Walks	Various (31 players)	4*	Various (31 occasions)	—
Strikeouts	Brad Nelson	7^{†}	May 5, 2006	New Orleans Zephyrs
Strikeouts (9 inn.)	Various (2 players)	5*	Various (2 occasions)	—

=== Single-game pitching ===
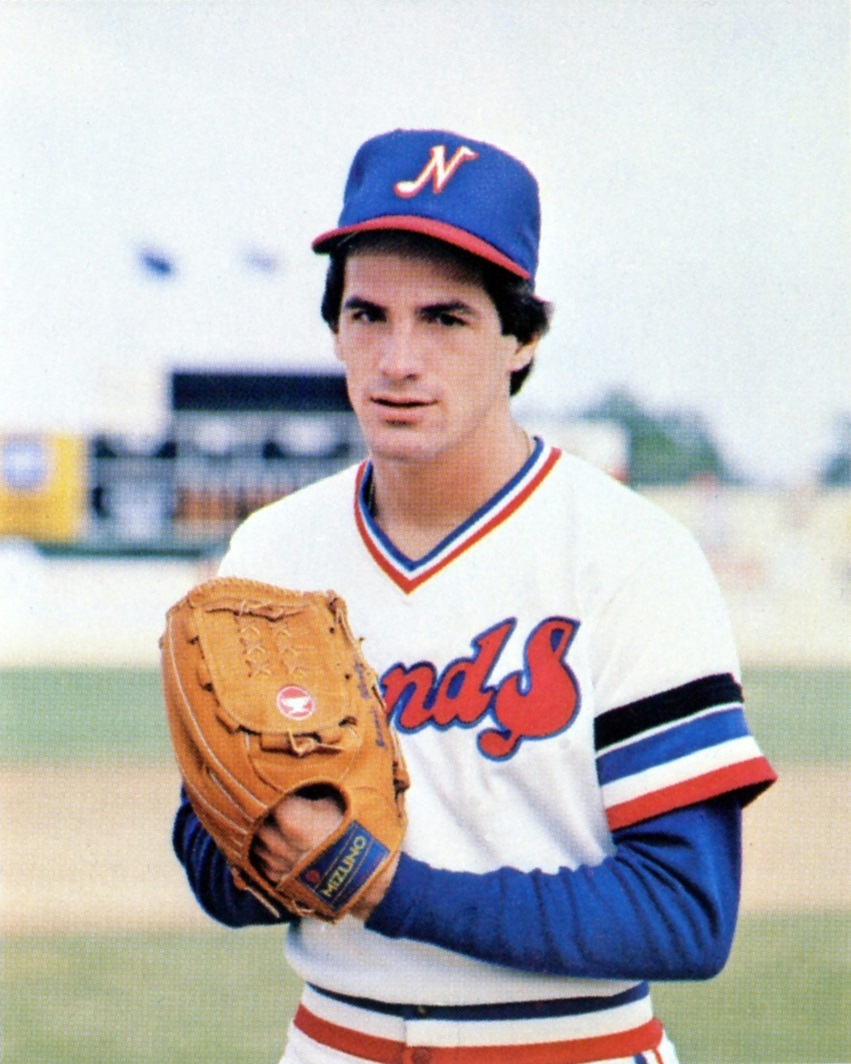
Jamie Werly struck out 15 batters on August 28, 1981.

Individual single-game pitching records
Statistic	Player	Record	Date	Opponent
Strikeouts	Jamie Werly	15*	August 28, 1981	Charlotte O's
Strikeouts	Luis Vasquez	15*	June 29, 1989	Columbus Clippers
Strikeouts	John Wasdin	15*	April 7, 2003	Albuquerque Isotopes
Walks	Bryan Kelly	10*	May 4, 1986	Buffalo Bisons
Walks	Chris Hammond	10*	May 26, 1989	Pawtucket Red Sox
Runs allowed	Jamie Werly	14	August 18, 1981	Birmingham Barons
Hits allowed	Jamie Werly	16	August 18, 1981	Birmingham Barons

== Team season records ==
These are records of Sounds teams with the best and worst performances in distinct statistical categories over a single season.

=== Season general ===
Team season general records
Statistic	High	Season(s)	Low	Season(s)
Wins	97	1980	57	2013
Losses	87	2013	46	1980
Winning percentage	.678	1980	.396	2013
Streaks (win/loss)	15*	1999, 2018, 2021	12	1987
Home wins	51	1980	28	2000
Home losses	43	2000	20	1980
Home winning percentage	.718	1980	.394	2000
Road wins	47	2016	23	1986
Road losses	48*	1986, 2013	23	2016
Road winning percentage	.671	2016	.324	1986
Extra-inning games	17*	1980, 1988, 2004, 2012, 2023, 2024	5	2014
Extra-inning wins	14	1980	1*	2013, 2014
Extra-inning losses	11*	1986, 2004, 2012	3	1980
Extra-inning winning percentage	.824	1980	.100	2013
One-run games	52	2011	29	2023
One-run wins	32	1980	13	2008
One-run losses	31	2006	10^{§}	1980
One-run winning percentage	.707	1989	.342	2008

=== Season batting ===
Team season batting records
Statistic	High	Season(s)	Low	Season(s)
Batting average	.289	1999	.241	2021
At bats	5,029	2022	4,174	2021
Runs	809	2022	489	1978
Hits	1,383	2011	1,006	2021
Total bases	2,266	1999	1,458	1978
Doubles	292	1999	172	1991
Triples	60*	1979, 1980	18	2002
Home runs	183*	1999, 2023	36	1978
Runs batted in	761	1999	421	1978
Sacrifice hits	92	2009	7	2022
Sacrifice flies	54*	1986, 1999	23	1991
Hit by pitch	103	2026	23*	1985, 1988
Walks	680	1984	368	1996
Intentional walks	48	1979	3*	2022, 2023, 2025
Strikeouts	1,379	2025	624	1987
Stolen bases	316	2025	57	2016
Caught stealing	86	1980	21	2016
Runners left on base	1,156	1984	917	2014

=== Season pitching ===
Team season pitching records
Statistic	High	Season(s)	Low	Season(s)
Earned run average	5.46	2019	3.13	1980
Complete games	63	1983	0*	2021, 2024, 2025
Shutouts	16	2025	1	1999
Saves	46	1994	12	1983
Innings pitched	1,304 2/3	2022	1,112	2021
Hits allowed	1,364	2004	1,019	2021
Runs allowed	814	2019	520	1978
Earned runs	732	2019	421	1978
Home runs allowed	175	2019	54	1978
Hit batsmen	96	2019	15	1979
Walks	666	1984	356	2002
Intentional walks	79^{§}	1978	1	2023
Strikeouts	1,320	2026	708	1983
Wild pitches	91	2000	40	2003
Balks	71	1988	2	2006

=== Season fielding ===
Team season fielding records
Statistic	High	Season(s)	Low	Season(s)
Fielding percentage	.985	2022	.958	1984
Putouts	3,914	2022	3,336	2021
Assists	1,657	1982	1,096	2021
Errors	240^{§}	1984	78	2022
Double plays	168	2010	90	1979
Triple plays	2	2011	0*	1978, 1979, 1980, 1981, 1983, 1984, 1985, 1987, 1988, 1989, 1990, 1992, 1993, 1995, 1996, 1997, 1998, 1999, 2001, 2002, 2003, 2004, 2006, 2007, 2009, 2010, 2014, 2016, 2017, 2018, 2019, 2021, 2022, 2023, 2024, 2025, 2026
Passed balls	30	2013	3	2019

== Team single-game records ==
These are records of Sounds teams which lead in distinct statistical categories for a single game.

=== Single-game batting ===
Team single-game batting records
Statistic	Record	Date	Opponent
At bats	81^{†}	May 5, 2006	New Orleans Zephyrs
Runs	20*	May 31, 1981	Knoxville Blue Jays
Runs	20*	May 20, 2000	Colorado Springs Sky Sox
Hits	24*	May 20, 2000	Colorado Springs Sky Sox
Hits	24*	May 21, 2000	Colorado Springs Sky Sox
Hits	24*	August 4, 2011	Colorado Springs Sky Sox
Doubles	8*	June 2, 1981	Birmingham Barons
Doubles	8*	May 22, 1994	Oklahoma City 89ers
Doubles	8*	May 1, 2002	Oklahoma RedHawks
Doubles	8*	May 27, 2003	Iowa Cubs
Doubles	8*	August 10, 2011	Reno Aces
Doubles	8*	May 27, 2015	Sacramento River Cats
Triples	4*	May 1, 1987	Denver Zephyrs
Triples	4*	June 25, 1990	Oklahoma City 89ers
Home runs	7	April 20, 2025	Charlotte Knights
Stolen bases	8	September 19, 2025	Louisville Bats
Walks	14	June 3, 2021	Charlotte Knights
Strikeouts	29^{†}	May 5, 2006	New Orleans Zephyrs
Strikeouts (9 inn.)	18	May 31, 2025	Indianapolis Indians
Runners left on base	22	May 5, 2006	New Orleans Zephyrs
Runners left on base (9 inn.)	20	April 18, 1979	Jacksonville Suns

=== Single-game pitching ===
Team single-game pitching records
Statistic	Record	Date	Opponent
Runs allowed	20*	August 19, 2013	Round Rock Express
Runs allowed	20*	August 25, 2014	Sacramento River Cats
Hits allowed	24*	May 27, 2012	Round Rock Express
Hits allowed	24*	August 25, 2014	Sacramento River Cats
Hits allowed	24*	May 3, 2019	Memphis Redbirds
Walks	15	April 28, 2019	Iowa Cubs
Strikeouts	20	June 26, 1993	Oklahoma City 89ers

== Attendance records ==
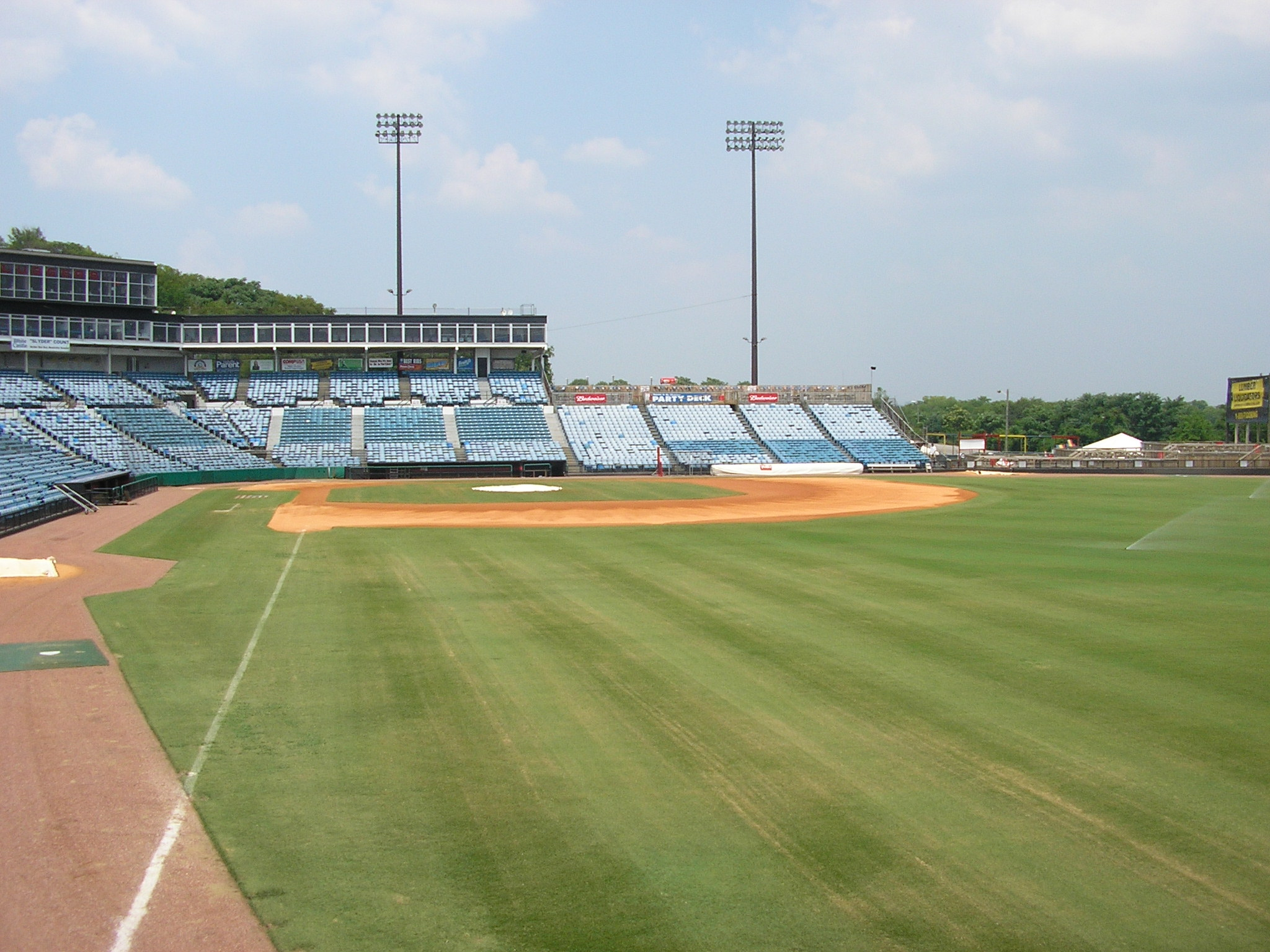
Herschel Greer Stadium, home of the Sounds from 1978 to 2014

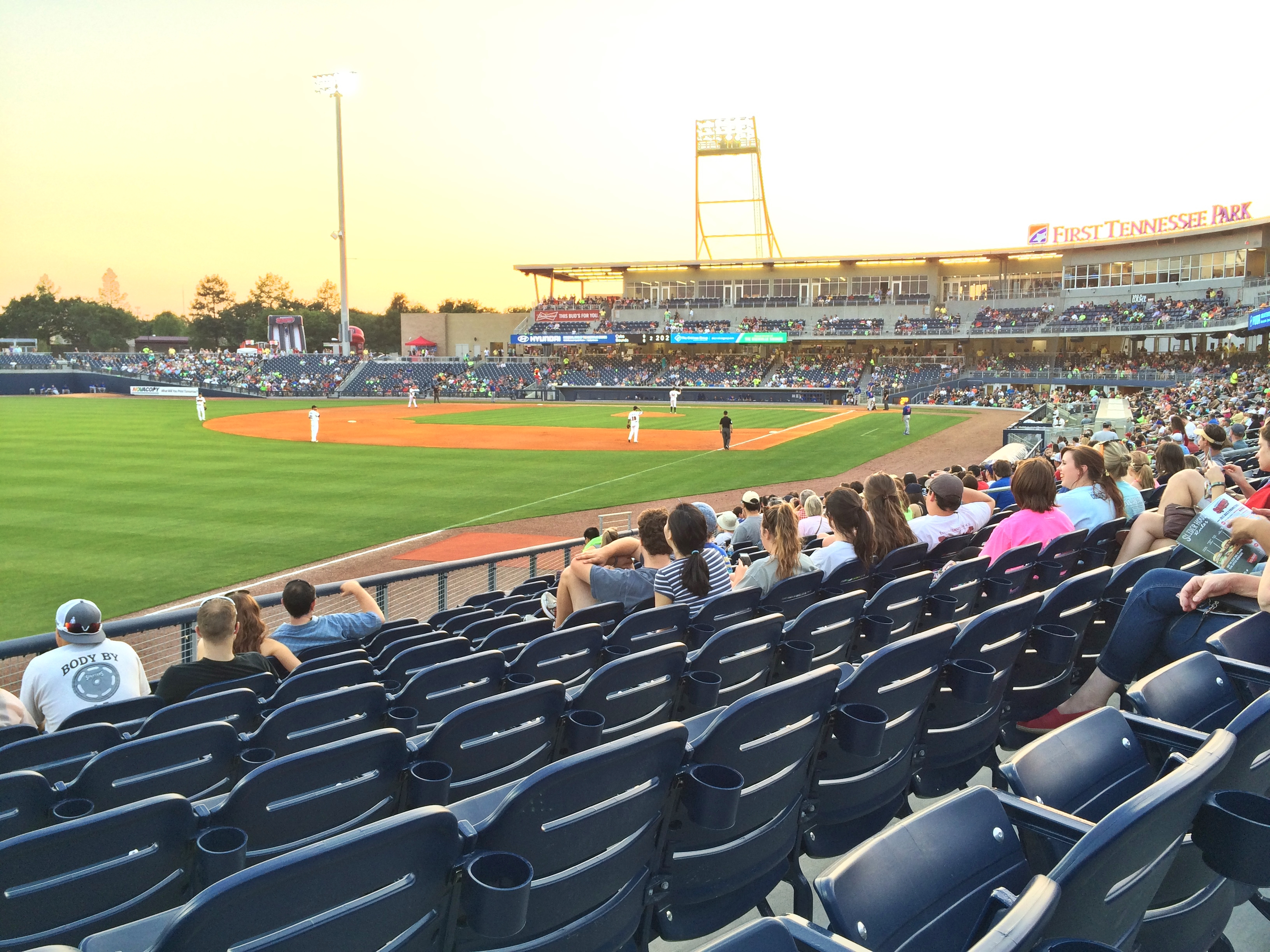
First Horizon Park, home of the Sounds since 2015

These are records of attendance at Sounds home games. The team originally played at Herschel Greer Stadium from 1978 to 2014. They have played at First Horizon Park since 2015.

Attendance records
Season	Attendance	Openings	Average	Cumulative total
1978	380,159	71	5,354	380,159
1979	515,488	70	7,364	895,647
1980	575,676^{§}	71	8,108	1,471,323
1981	567,994	74	7,676	2,039,317
1982	532,449	75	7,099	2,571,766
1983	500,048	77	6,494	3,071,814
1984	376,440	76	4,953	3,448,254
1985	364,225	72	5,059	3,812,479
1986	364,614	69	5,284	4,177,093
1987	378,715	69	5,489	4,555,808
1988	317,785	70	4,540	4,873,593
1989	457,854	73	6,272	5,331,447
1990	605,122	76	7,962	5,936,569
1991	454,575	72	6,651	6,391,144
1992	489,991	72	6,805	6,881,135
1993	438,745	72	6,094	7,319,880
1994	300,821	72	4,178	7,620,701
1995	355,133	72	4,932	7,975,834
1996	303,407	72	4,214	8,279,241
1997	269,186	72	3,739	8,548,427
1998	323,068	72	4,487	8,871,495
1999	335,901	71	4,731	9,207,396
2000	269,682	69	3,908	9,477,078
2001	305,385	69	4,426	9,782,463
2002	322,059	69	4,668	10,104,522
2003	387,345	67	5,781	10,491,867
2004	405,536	67	6,053	10,897,403
2005	419,412	69	6,078	11,316,815
2006	410,569	69	5,950	11,727,384
2007	411,959	70	5,885	12,139,343
2008	354,662	67	5,293	12,494,005
2009	305,434	68	4,492	12,799,439
2010	319,235	67	4,765	13,118,674
2011	335,143	69	4,857	13,453,817
2012	321,042	67	4,792	13,774,859
2013	355,003	70	5,071	14,129,892
2014	323,961	66	4,909	14,453,823
2015	565,548	71	7,965	15,019,371
2016	504,060	71	7,099	15,523,431
2017	593,679	67	8,861	16,117,110
2018	603,135	70	8,616	16,720,245
2019	578,291	67	8,631	17,298,536
2020 (Note: The 2020 season was cancelled due to the COVID-19 pandemic before it began.)	—	—	—	17,298,536
2021	436,868	65	6,721	17,735,404
2022	555,576	73	7,611	18,290,980
2023	556,962	72	7,736	18,847,942
2024	500,241	71	7,046	19,348,183
2025	500,002	71	7,042	19,848,185
2026	487,071	72	6,765	20,335,256
Totals	20,335,256	3,383	6,011	—

== Miscellaneous records ==
These are records of individual players and Sounds teams that do not fit into any of the preceding categories.

=== Individual ===
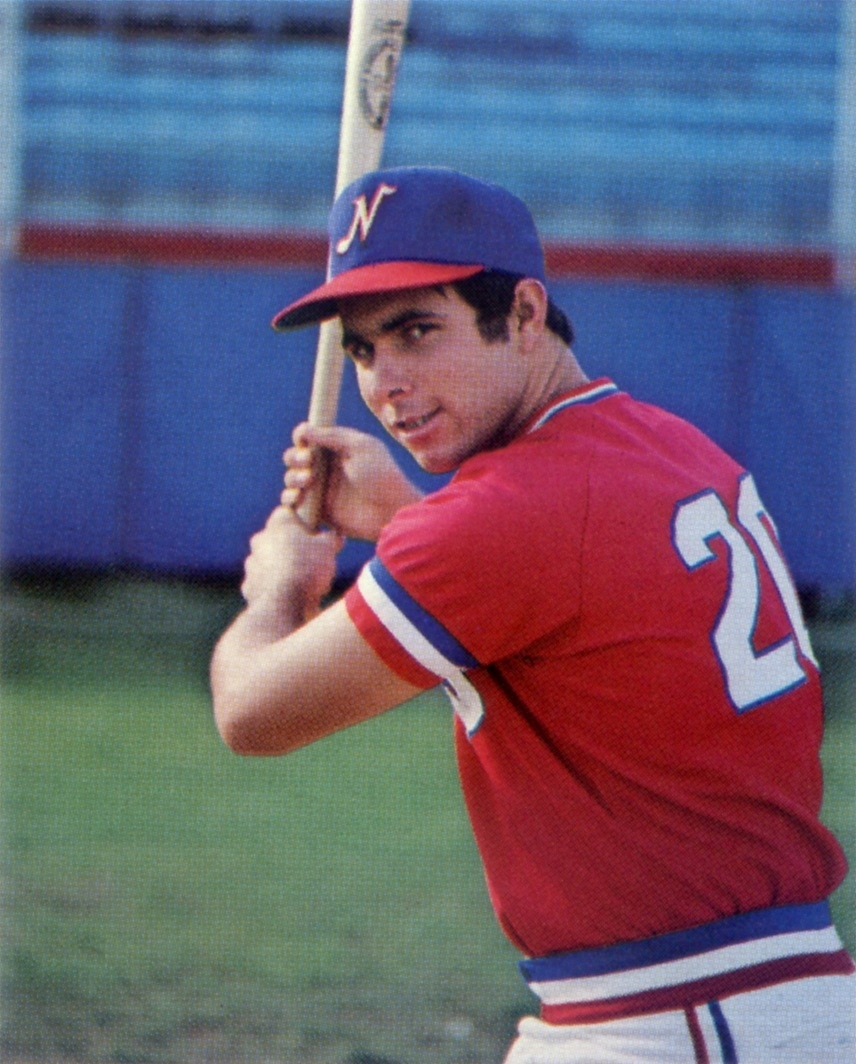
Dave Van Gorder played in 131 games as catcher in 1979, tying a Southern League record.

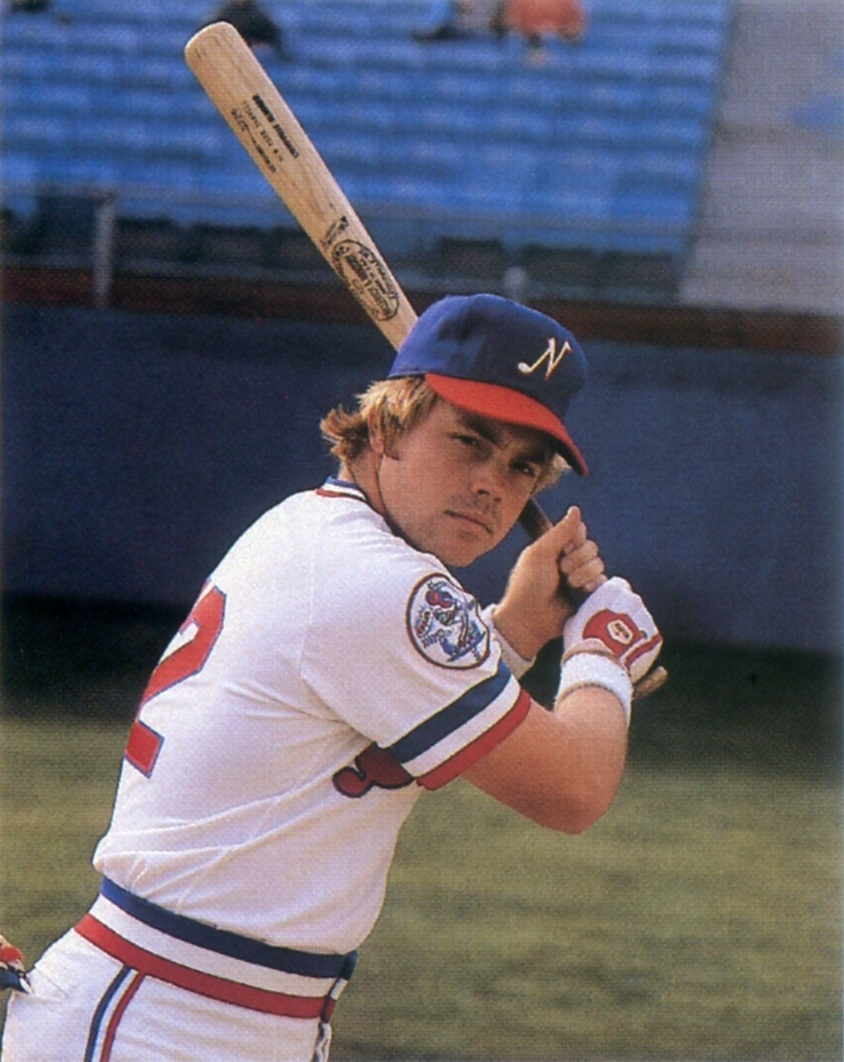
Buck Showalter hit 155 singles in 1980, a Southern League record.

Miscellaneous individual records
Statistic	Player	Record	Date(s)	Opponent	Ref(s).
Intentional walks (inning; pitcher)	Geoff Combe	3^{§}*	April 17, 1978	Knoxville Sox	
Intentional walks (season; pitcher)	Geoff Combe	18^{§}	1978	—	
Wild pitches (game)	Bruce Berenyi	5^{§}*	May 23, 1978	Columbus Astros	
Games as catcher (season)	Dave Van Gorder	131^{§}*	1979	—	
Singles (season)	Buck Showalter	155^{§}	1980	—	
Errors by a shortstop (season)	Otis Nixon	56^{§}	1981	—	
Putouts by an outfielder (game)	Jeff Williams	12^{§}*	August 31, 1984	Memphis Chicks	
Consecutive strikeouts (pitcher)	Scott Service	10^{‡}	August 16/18, 1992	Buffalo Bisons	
Consecutive innings with no walks (pitcher)	Brian Meadows	70 2/3^{†}	July 17, 2002–July 18, 2003	Various	

=== Team ===
Miscellaneous team records
Statistic	Record	Date(s)	Opponent	Ref.
Consecutive postseason appearances	6^{§}*	1979–1984	—	
Longest game (innings)	24^{†}*	May 5, 2006	New Orleans Zephyrs	
Players used (game; both teams)	40^{†}*	May 5, 2006	New Orleans Zephyrs	
Pitchers used (game)	9^{†}*	May 5, 2006	New Orleans Zephyrs	
Pitchers used (game; both teams; 9 inn.)	14^{†}	April 11, 1998	Colorado Springs Sky Sox	
Pitchers used (game; both teams; 9 inn.)	14^{†}	June 24, 2003	Colorado Springs Sky Sox	
Pitchers used (game; both teams)	17^{†}	May 5, 2006	New Orleans Zephyrs	
Strikeouts (batting; game; both teams)	48^{†}	May 5, 2006	New Orleans Zephyrs	
Strikeouts (pitching; game; both teams)	48^{†}	May 5, 2006	New Orleans Zephyrs	
At bats (game; both teams)	166^{†}	May 5, 2006	New Orleans Zephyrs	
Assists (game)	28^{†}*	May 5, 2006	New Orleans Zephyrs	
Assists (game; both teams)	53^{†}	May 5, 2006	New Orleans Zephyrs	
Highest attendance (game)	22,315^{§}	August 18, 1982	Columbus Astros	
Lowest attendance (game)	0^{†}	June 14, 2008	Iowa Cubs	
