= List of Pacific Coast League records =

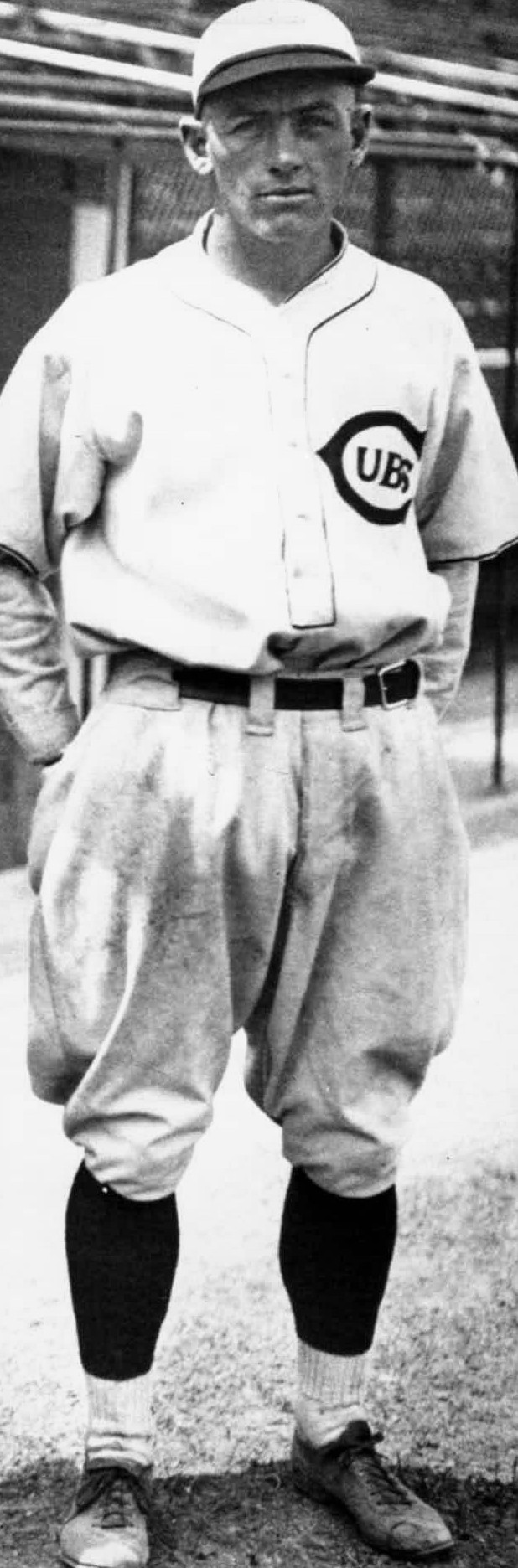
Jigger Statz holds eight PCL career batting records: games played (2,790), at bats (10,657), runs (1,996), hits (3,356), total bases (4,405), singles (2,563), doubles (595), and triples (137).

The Pacific Coast League (PCL) is a Minor League Baseball league operating at the Triple-A level. It was founded in 1903 as circuit of six teams on the West Coast of the United States. After the cancellation of the 2020 season, the league was known as the Triple-A West in 2021 before reverting to the Pacific Coast League name in 2022. This list documents the PCL's top players and teams in particular statistical areas.

The mild climate of the West Coast, especially California, allowed the league to play longer seasons, sometimes starting in late February and ending as late as the beginning of December. Teams regularly played between 170 and 200 games in a season until the late 1950s. This abundance of games and playing time is one reason that a number of league records were set during the first half of the 20th century.

== Table key ==
*	Tie between two or more players/teams

== Career records ==
These are records of individual players with the best performance in particular statistical categories during a single season organized by vintage era (1903–1957) and modern era (1958–present).

=== Career batting ===
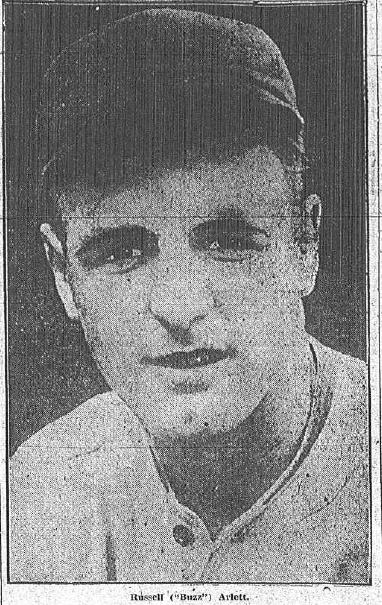
Buzz Arlett holds the PCL career records in home runs (251) and runs batted in (1,188).

Statistic	Player	Record	Season	Team(s)	Ref.
Games played	Jigger Statz	2,790	1920–21, 1925–26, 1929–42	Los Angeles Angels	
At bats	Jigger Statz	10,657	1920–21, 1925–26, 1929–42	Los Angeles Angels	
Runs	Jigger Statz	1,996	1920–21, 1925–26, 1929–42	Los Angeles Angels	
Hits	Jigger Statz	3,356	1920–21, 1925–26, 1929–42	Los Angeles Angels	
Total bases	Jigger Statz	4,405	1920–21, 1925–26, 1929–42	Los Angeles Angels	
Singles	Jigger Statz	2,563	1920–21, 1925–26, 1929–42	Los Angeles Angels	
Doubles	Jigger Statz	595	1920–21, 1925–26, 1929–42	Los Angeles Angels	
Triples	Jigger Statz	137	1920–21, 1925–26, 1929–42	Los Angeles Angels	
Home runs	Buzz Arlett	251	1918–30	Oakland Oaks	
Runs batted in	Buzz Arlett	1,188	1918–30	Oakland Oaks	
Stolen bases	Billy Lane	468	1916–17, 1919–20; 1921–26	Oakland Oaks; Seattle Rainiers/Indians	
Sacrifice hits	Eddie Mulligan	390	1919–20; 1923–27; 1929–32, 1935; 1932; 1932–33; 1934; 1935; 1936–38	Salt Lake City Bees; San Francisco Seals; Mission Reds; Seattle Indians; Portland Beavers; Oakland Oaks; Hollywood Stars; San Diego Padres	

=== Career pitching ===
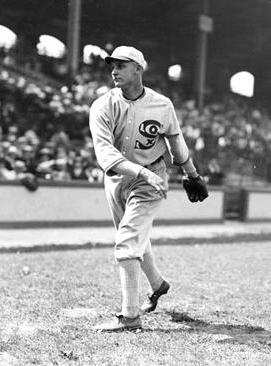
Frank Shellenback holds the PCL career pitching records in complete games (364), wins (296), and innings pitched (4,184.1).

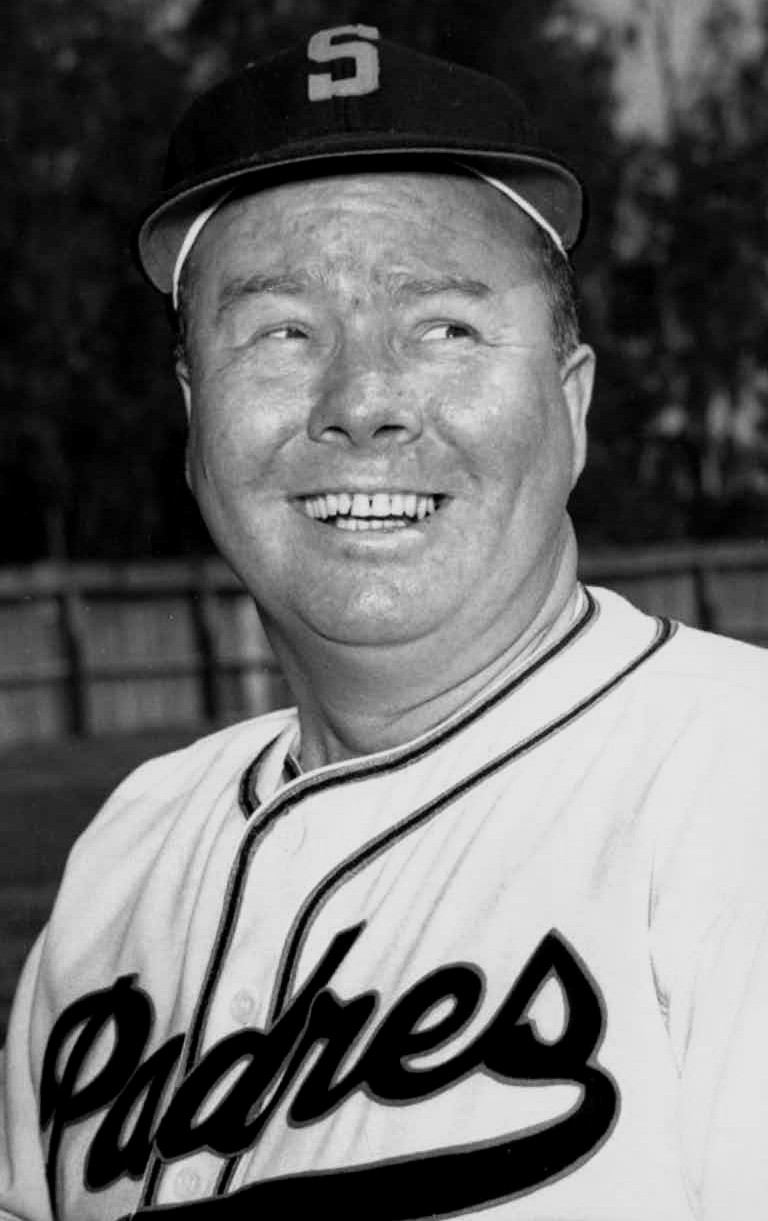
Dick Barrett holds the PCL career pitching record in strikeouts (1,866).

Statistic	Player	Record	Season	Team(s)	Ref.
Games	Herman Pillette	708	1920–21, 1925; 1926–33; 1933–35; 1935; 1936–42; 1943–45	Portland Beavers; Mission Bells/Reds; Seattle Indians; Hollywood Stars; San Diego Padres; Sacramento Solons	
Complete games	Frank Shellenback	364	1920–24; 1925; 1926–35; 1936–38	Vernon Tigers; Sacramento Senators; Hollywood Stars; San Diego Padres	
Wins	Frank Shellenback	296	1920–24; 1925; 1926–35; 1936–38	Vernon Tigers; Sacramento Senators; Hollywood Stars; San Diego Padres	
Losses	Spider Baum	235*	1903–05; 1909–12; 1912–13; 1914–19; 1919–20	Los Angeles Angels; Sacramento Sacts; Vernon/Venice Tigers; San Francisco Seals; Salt Lake City Bees	
Losses	Herman Pillette	235*	1920–21, 1925; 1926–33; 1933–35; 1935; 1936–42; 1943–45	Portland Beavers; Mission Bells/Reds; Seattle Indians; Hollywood Stars; San Diego Padres; Sacramento Solons	
Innings pitched	Frank Shellenback	4,184.1	1920–24; 1925; 1926–35; 1936–38	Vernon Tigers; Sacramento Senators; Hollywood Stars; San Diego Padres	
Strikeouts	Dick Barrett	1,866	1935–42; 1946; 1947–49; 1949–50; 1950	Seattle Indians/Rainiers; Portland Beavers; Seattle Rainiers; San Diego Padres; Hollywood Stars	

=== Career fielding ===
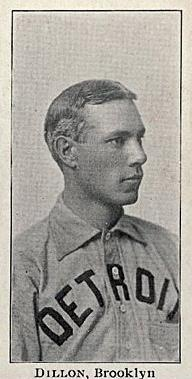
Frank Dillon holds the career fielding records among first basemen in putouts (14,441), assists (1,060), and chances accepted (15,501).

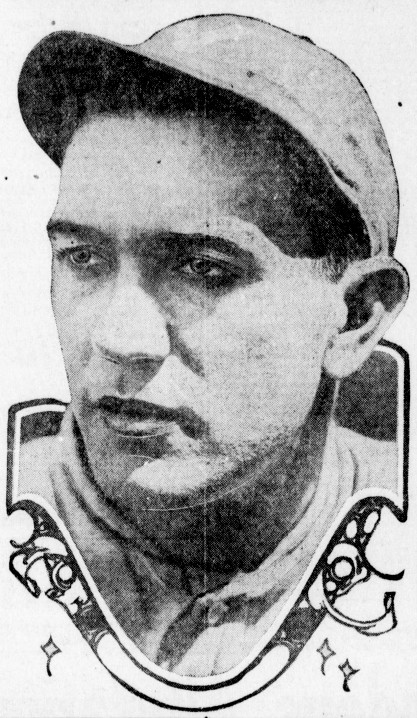
Ray French holds the career fielding records among shortstops in putouts (4,410), assists (7,179), and chances accepted (11,589).

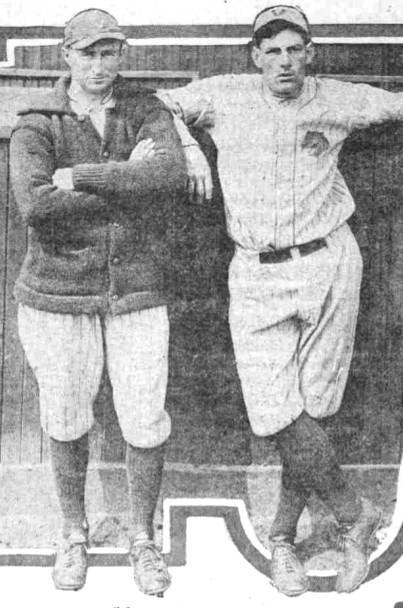
Truck Hannah (right) holds the career fielding records among catchers in putouts (6,816), assists (1,649), and chances accepted (8,465).

Statistic	Player	Record	Season	Team(s)	Ref.
Putouts, pitcher	Tony Freitas	262	1929–32, 1937–42, 1946–50	Sacramento Senators/Solons	
Putouts, catcher	Truck Hannah	6,816	1914; 1915–17; 1921–25; 1925; 1926–35	Sacramento Senators/Solons; Salt Lake City Bees; Vernon Tigers; Portland Beavers; Los Angeles Angels	
Putouts, first baseman	Frank Dillon	14,441	1903, 1905–13, 1915	Los Angeles Angels	
Putouts, second baseman	Jimmie Reese	4,771	1920, 1933–36; 1924–29; 1937–38	Los Angeles Angels; Oakland Oaks; San Diego Padres	
Putouts, third baseman	Eddie Mulligan	2,221	1919–20; 1923–27; 1929–32, 1935; 1932; 1932–33; 1934; 1935; 1936–38	Salt Lake City Bees; San Francisco Seals; Mission Reds; Seattle Indians; Portland Beavers; Oakland Oaks; Hollywood Stars; San Diego Padres	
Putouts, shortstop	Ray French	4,410	1919; 1921–23; 1925–34; 1934	Seattle Rainiers; Vernon Tigers; Sacramento Senators; Oakland Oaks	
Putouts, outfielder	Jigger Statz	6,872	1920–21, 1925–26, 1929–42	Los Angeles Angels	
Assists, pitcher	Spider Baum	1,308	1903–05; 1909–12; 1912–13; 1914–19; 1919–20	Los Angeles Angels; Sacramento Sacts; Vernon/Venice Tigers; San Francisco Seals; Salt Lake City Bees	
Assists, catcher	Truck Hannah	1,649	1914; 1915–17; 1921–25; 1925; 1926–35	Sacramento Senators/Solons; Salt Lake City Bees; Vernon Tigers; Portland Beavers; Los Angeles Angels	
Assists, first baseman	Frank Dillon	1,060	1903, 1905–13, 1915	Los Angeles Angels	
Assists, second baseman	Jimmie Reese	5,119	1920, 1933–36; 1924–29; 1937–38	Los Angeles Angels; Oakland Oaks; San Diego Padres	
Assists, third baseman	Eddie Mulligan	4,762	1919–20; 1923–27; 1929–32, 1935; 1932; 1932–33; 1934; 1935; 1936–38	Salt Lake City Bees; San Francisco Seals; Mission Reds; Seattle Indians; Portland Beavers; Oakland Oaks; Hollywood Stars; San Diego Padres	
Assists, shortstop	Ray French	7,179	1919; 1921–23; 1925–34; 1934	Seattle Rainiers; Vernon Tigers; Sacramento Senators; Oakland Oaks	
Assists, outfielder	Jigger Statz	263	1920–21, 1925–26, 1929–42	Los Angeles Angels	
Chances accepted, pitcher	Spider Baum	1,531	1903–05; 1909–12; 1912–13; 1914–19; 1919–20	Los Angeles Angels; Sacramento Sacts; Vernon/Venice Tigers; San Francisco Seals; Salt Lake City Bees	
Chances accepted, catcher	Truck Hannah	8,465	1914; 1915–17; 1921–25; 1925; 1926–35	Sacramento Senators/Solons; Salt Lake City Bees; Vernon Tigers; Portland Beavers; Los Angeles Angels	
Chances accepted, first baseman	Frank Dillon	15,501	1903, 1905–13, 1915	Los Angeles Angels	
Chances accepted, second baseman	Jimmie Reese	9,890	1920, 1933–36; 1924–29; 1937–38	Los Angeles Angels; Oakland Oaks; San Diego Padres	
Chances accepted, third baseman	Eddie Mulligan	6,983	1919–20; 1923–27; 1929–32, 1935; 1932; 1932–33; 1934; 1935; 1936–38	Salt Lake City Bees; San Francisco Seals; Mission Reds; Seattle Indians; Portland Beavers; Oakland Oaks; Hollywood Stars; San Diego Padres	
Chances accepted, shortstop	Ray French	11,589	1919; 1921–23; 1925–34; 1934	Seattle Rainiers; Vernon Tigers; Sacramento Senators; Oakland Oaks	
Chances accepted, outfielder	Jigger Statz	7,135	1920–21, 1925–26, 1929–42	Los Angeles Angels	

== Individual single-season records ==
These are records of individual players with the best performance in particular statistical categories during a single season organized by vintage era (1903–1957) and modern era (1958–present).

=== Single-season batting ===
==== 1903–1957 ====
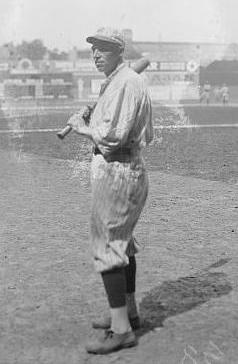
Jimmy Johnston of the San Francisco Seals stole 124 bases in 1913.

Statistic	Player	Record	Season	Team	Ref.
Batting average	Ox Eckhardt	.414	1933	Mission Reds	
Games played	William Devereaux	228	1904	Oakland Oaks	
At bats	George Van Haltren	933	1904	Seattle Siwashes	
Runs	Tony Lazzeri	202	1925	Salt Lake City Bees	
Hits	Paul Strand	325	1923	Salt Lake City Bees	
Total bases	Ike Boone	553	1929	Mission Reds	
Singles	Phil Nadeau	233	1903	Portland Browns	
Doubles	Paul Waner	75	1925	San Francisco Seals	
Triples	Brooks Holder	24	1939	San Francisco Seals	
Home runs	Tony Lazzeri	60	1925	Salt Lake City Bees	
Runs batted in	Tony Lazzeri	222	1925	Salt Lake City Bees	
Stolen bases	Jimmy Johnston	124	1913	San Francisco Seals	
Sacrifice hits	Buzzy Wares	74	1910	Oakland Oaks	
Walks^{[a]}	Max West	201	1949	San Diego Padres	
Strikeouts	Steve Bilko	150	1957	Los Angeles Angels	

- ^{a} No records available prior to 1940

==== 1958–present ====
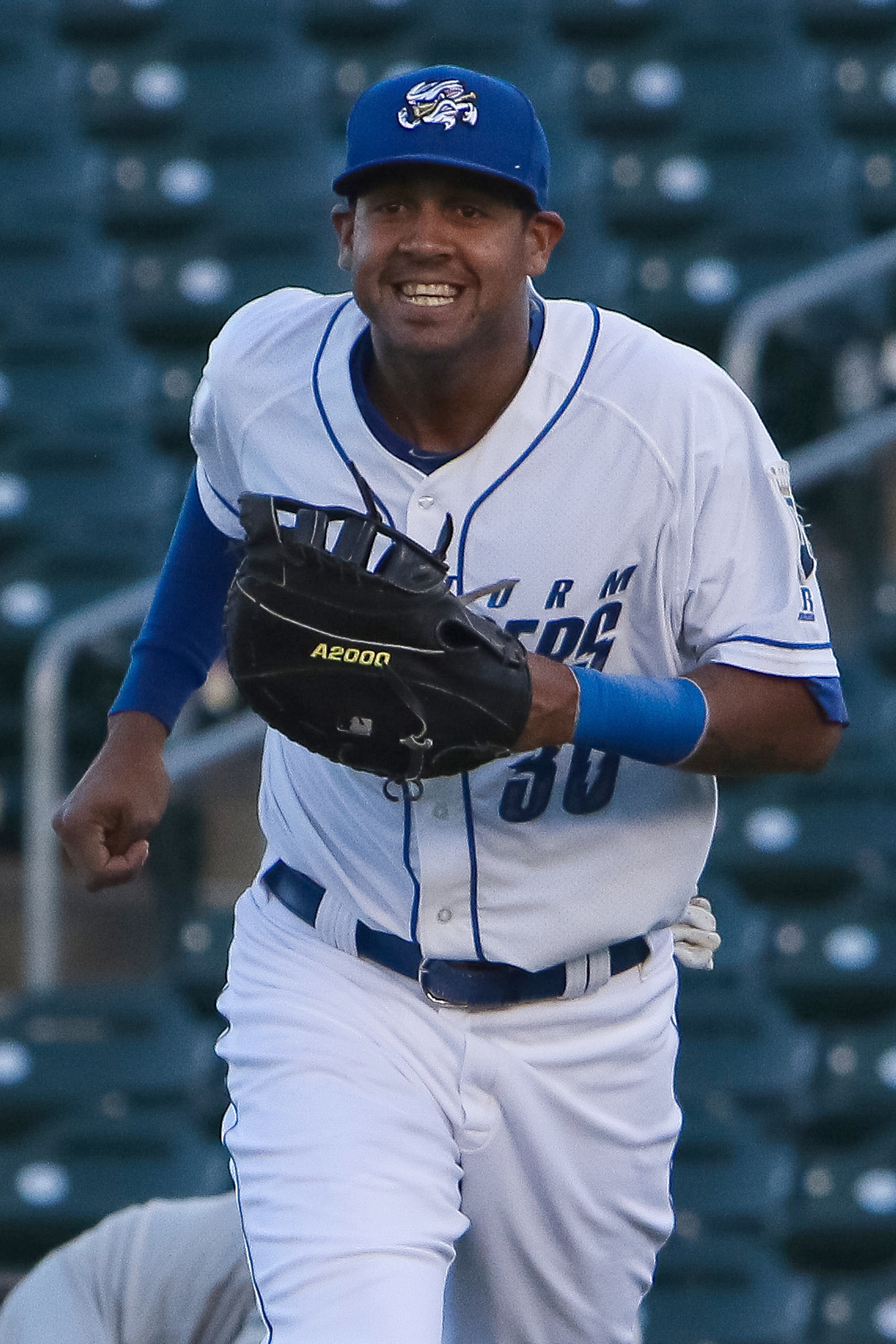
José Martínez of the Omaha Storm Chasers had a .384 batting average in 2015.

Statistic	Player	Record	Season	Team	Ref.
Batting average	José Martínez	.384	2015	Omaha Storm Chasers	
At bats	Jesús Alou	648	1963	Tacoma Giants	
Runs	Billy Sample	141	1978	Tucson Toros	
Hits	Willie Davis	216	1960	Spokane Indians	
Total bases	Bill McNulty	363	1974	Sacramento Solons	
Doubles	Walt Williams	54*	1966	Tulsa Oilers	
Doubles	Delwyn Young	54*	2007	Las Vegas 51s	
Triples	Willie Davis	26	1960	Spokane Indians	
Home runs	Bill McNulty	55^{[a]}	1974	Sacramento Solons	
Home runs	Ron Kittle	50	1982	Edmonton Trappers	
Runs batted in	Ron Kittle	144	1982	Edmonton Trappers	
Stolen bases	Kim Allen	84	1980	Spokane Indians	
Sacrifice hits	Ronald Torreyes	21	2014	Oklahoma City RedHawks	
Sacrifice flies	Ron Roenicke	16	1981	Albuquerque Dukes	
Walks	Bobby Klaus	154	1966	San Diego Padres	
Hit by pitch	Carlos Quentin	31	2006	Tucson Sidewinders	
Strikeouts	A.J. Zapp	184	2004	Tacoma Rainiers	
Grounded into double play	Yangervis Solarte	29	2012	Round Rock Express	

- ^{a} Left field at Sacramento's Hughes Stadium was less than the 250 feet (76 m) feet prescribed in Official Baseball Rule 1.04.

=== Single-season pitching ===
==== 1903–1957 ====
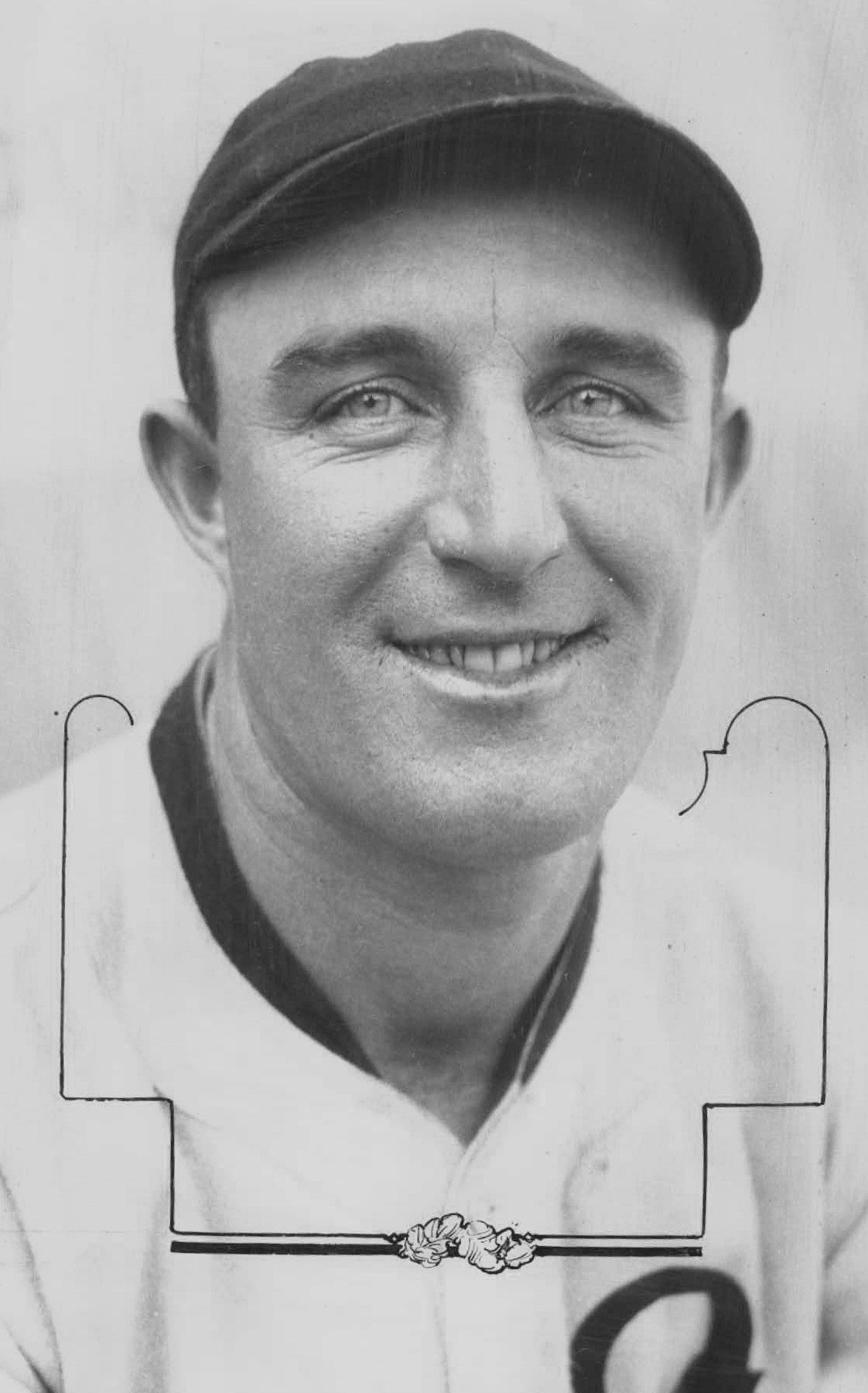
George Boehler of the Oakland Oaks allowed 190 earned runs in 1925.

Statistic	Player	Record	Season	Team	Ref.
Games	Bob Anderson	70	1956	Los Angeles Angels	
Complete games	Jimmy Whalen	55*	1904	San Francisco Seals	
Complete games	Oscar Jones	55*	1906	Seattle Siwashes	
Wins	Doc Newton	39*	1904	Los Angeles Angels	
Wins	Rube Vickers	39*	1906	Seattle Siwashes	
Losses	Ike Butler	32	1904	Portland Browns	
Saves	Bob Anderson	25	1956	Los Angeles Angels	
Shutouts^{[a]}	Jimmy Whalen	14*	1905	San Francisco Seals	
Shutouts^{[a]}	Vean Gregg	14*	1910	Portland Beavers	
Innings pitched	Rube Vickers	518.2	1906	Seattle Siwashes	
Runs	Oscar Graham	292	1903	Oakland Oaks	
Earned runs	George Boehler	190	1925	Oakland Oaks	
Earned run average^{[b]}	Jack Quinn	1.48	1918	Vernon Tigers	
Hits allowed	Ike Butler	491	1903	Portland Browns	
Strikeouts	Rube Vickers	411	1906	Seattle Siwashes	
Walks	Oscar Graham	233	1903	Oakland Oaks	
Hit batsmen	Oscar Graham	49	1903	Oakland Oaks	
Wild pitches	Ed Willett	28	1910	Vernon Tigers	

- ^{a} No records available 1903, 1907–1909, 1911–1913
- ^{b} No records available prior to 1914

==== 1958–present ====
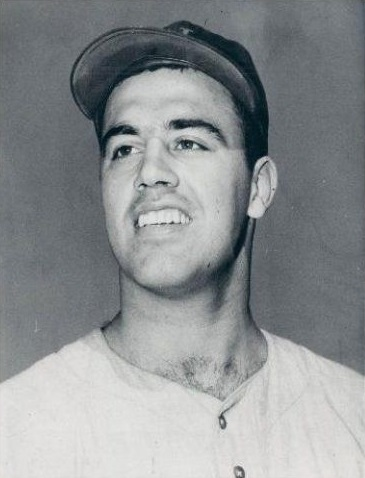
Dave Giusti of the Oklahoma City 89ers pitched 7 Shutouts in 1963.

Statistic	Player	Record	Season	Team	Ref.
Games	Ken Rowe	88	1964	Spokane Indians	
Complete games	Bob Garibaldi	20	1970	Phoenix Giants	
Wins	Mark Bomback	22	1979	Vancouver Canadians	
Losses	Lew Krausse Jr.	19	1964	Dallas Rangers	
Saves	Ryan Speier	33*	2007	Colorado Springs Sky Sox	
Saves	Chris Hatcher	33*	2013	New Orleans Zephyrs	
Shutouts	Dave Giusti	7	1963	Oklahoma City 89ers	
Innings pitched	Rich Robertson	256	1968	Phoenix Giants	
Runs	Carl Austerman	157	1975	Sacramento Solons	
Earned runs	Carl Austerman	131	1975	Sacramento Solons	
Earned run average	Dick Hall	1.87	1959	Salt Lake City Bees	
Hits allowed	Chi-Chi Olivo	279	1963	Denver Bears	
Home runs allowed	Tom Hausman	50^{[a]}	1974	Sacramento Solons	
Home runs allowed	Kris Wilson	39	2004	Omaha Royals	
Strikeouts	Al Stanek	220*	1964	Tacoma Giants	
Strikeouts	Juan Berenguer	220*	1979	Tacoma Tugs	
Walks	Sam McDowell	152	1961	Salt Lake City Bees	
Wild pitches	Jaime Cocanower	32	1987	Albuquerque Dukes	
Balks	Mike Loynd	21	1988	Tucson Toros	

- ^{a} Left field at Sacramento's Hughes Stadium was less than the 250 feet (76 m) feet prescribed in Official Baseball Rule 1.04.

== Team single-season records ==
These are records of individual players with the best performance in particular statistical categories during a single season organized by vintage era (1903–1957) and modern era (1958–present).

=== Single-season batting ===
==== 1903–1957 ====
Statistic	Team	Record	Season
Batting average	Salt Lake City Bees	.327	1923
At bats	Seattle Siwashes	7,623	1904
Runs	Salt Lake City Bees	1,416	1924
Hits	Salt Lake City Bees	2,395	1923
Total bases	Salt Lake City Bees	3,648	1923
Singles	San Francisco Seals	1,693	1923
Doubles	Salt Lake City Bees	556	1924
Triples	San Francisco Seals	114	1931
Home runs	Salt Lake City Bees	204	1923
Runs batted in^{[a]}	Salt Lake City Bees	1,294	1924
Stolen bases	Sacramento Senators	422	1903
Sacrifice hits	Oakland Oaks	324	1927
Walks^{[b]}	San Francisco Seals	875	1950

- ^{a} No records available prior to 1921
- ^{b} No records available prior to 1939

==== 1958–present ====
Statistic	Team	Record	Season
Runs	Salt Lake Buzz	1,016	2000
Hits	Salt Lake Buzz	1,580	2000
Home runs	Sacramento Solons	305^{[a]}	1974
Home runs	El Paso Chihuahuas	258	2019
Hit by pitch	Omaha Royals	112	2002
Strikeouts	El Paso Chihuahuas	1,329	2018

- ^{a} Left field at Sacramento's Hughes Stadium was less than the 250 feet (76 m) feet prescribed in Official Baseball Rule 1.04.

=== Single-season pitching ===
Statistic	Team	Record	Season
Strikeouts	Fresno Grizzlies	1,330	2018

=== Single-season fielding ===
Statistic	Team	Record	Season
Fielding percentage	Round Rock Express	.986	2019
Putouts	San Francisco Seals	6,284	1905
Assists	Portland Beavers	3,477	1914
Chances accepted	San Francisco Seals	9,350	1905
Errors	Portland Browns	669	1904
Passed balls^{[a]}	Spokane Indians	51	1970
Double plays	Seattle Indians	239	1931

- ^{a} No records available prior to 1940
