= Jerry Goff =

American baseball player (born 1964)

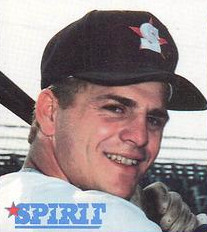
- Goff in 1988
- Catcher
- Born: April 12, 1964 (age 62); San Rafael, California, U.S.
- Batted: Left Threw: Right

MLB debut
- May 15, 1990, for the Montreal Expos

Last MLB appearance
- May 12, 1996, for the Houston Astros

MLB statistics
- Batting average: .215
- Home runs: 7
- Runs batted in: 19
- Stats at Baseball Reference

Teams
- Montreal Expos (1990, 1992); Pittsburgh Pirates (1993–1994); Houston Astros (1995–1996)

Jerry Leroy Goff (born April 12, 1964) is an American former professional baseball catcher. He played in Major League Baseball (MLB) for the Montreal Expos, Pittsburgh Pirates, and Houston Astros. He was listed at 6 ft 3 in (1.91 m) and 207 pounds. In his last major league game, Goff tied two other players for the major league record for most passed balls in a single game post-1900. He is the father of NFL quarterback Jared Goff.

== Amateur career ==
Goff was drafted twice as a player while attending San Rafael High School, by the Oakland Athletics in 1983 and the New York Yankees in 1984, but elected instead to attend the University of California, Berkeley. He is ninth in career home runs for Cal (29; tied with Josh Satin). Goff was drafted in the third round of the 1986 Major League Baseball draft, 63rd overall, by the Seattle Mariners. He agreed to sign and went professional.

== Professional career ==
Goff struggled with a low batting average while advancing through Seattle's minor league system, but also showed good power.

The Montreal Expos acquired him from Seattle in exchange for Pat Pacillo on February 27, 1990, and he made his Major League Baseball debut with them on May 15 of that year. Goff recorded his first major league hit on May 18, 1990, against San Francisco Giants pitcher Rick Reuschel at Candlestick Park. He returned to the minors for 1991, but spent parts of the next six years as a backup catcher for the Expos, Pittsburgh Pirates, and Houston Astros.

On May 12, 1996, Goff allowed six passed balls in a single game: two each in the first, third, and fourth innings, which tied him with catchers Rube Vickers and Geno Petralli for the single-game modern-era major league record. Goff had two hits in the game, including a home run, but his miscues led to five unearned runs for the Expos, who went on to win the game 8–7. The Astros sent Goff to Triple-A on May 17, and he never appeared in another big league game. In total, he appeared in 90 games in his major league career, and batted .215 with a .320 on-base percentage and a .336 slugging percentage in 214 at bats.

Goff played one more season of professional baseball in 1997. While with the independent Amarillo Dillas, Goff was selected to the Texas–Louisiana League All-Star team. The last healthy position player remaining on the roster, Goff entered the game as a pinch hitter in the ninth inning and hit a game-winning double.

Working as a firefighter in 2001, Goff was still playing semi-pro baseball for the Novato Knicks, an exhibition team based in Marin County, California.

== Personal life ==
Goff lives in Novato, California with his wife. He has two children, Lauren and Jared. Jared Goff played quarterback for the California Golden Bears from 2013 to 2015 and was selected by the Los Angeles Rams as the first overall pick in the 2016 NFL draft.
