= Cack Henley =

American baseball player

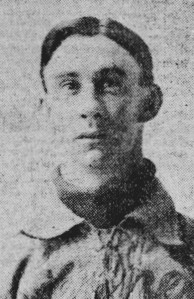
- Henley in 1910
- Pitcher
- Born: June 21, 1884; Sacramento, California, US
- Died: July 9, 1929 (aged 45); Sacramento, California, US
- Batted: Right Threw: Right

Member of the Pacific Coast League

Baseball Hall of Fame
- Induction: 2003

Clarence T. "Cack" Henley (June 21, 1884 – July 9, 1929) was an American professional baseball pitcher. He played for the San Francisco Seals and Venice / Vernon Tigers of the Pacific Coast League from 1905 to 1915. He is a member of the PCL Hall of Fame.

== Early life and career ==
Henley was born in Sacramento, California. He worked with his father as a bricklayer, while he began his baseball career as a pitcher. In 1903, he pitched in an outlaw league.

== Pacific Coast League ==
Henley joined the San Francisco Seals of the Pacific Coast League in 1905. He played for the Pueblo Indians of the Western League and the Sacramento Cordovas of the California League due to the 1906 San Francisco fire during the 1906 season, but returned to the Seals the next year.

On June 8, 1909, Henley pitched a 24-inning complete game shutout against the Oakland Oaks, with the Seals winning the game 1–0. This is the longest complete game shutout in baseball history. He finished the 1909 season with a 31–10 win–loss record; his .756 winning percentage was the best in the PCL. Henley won 34 games in the 1910 season, setting a PCL record.

After the 1913 season, San Francisco traded Henley and Roy McArdle to the Venice Tigers for Spider Baum. Henley did not report to the Tigers in 1916 due to a salary dispute, as the Tigers wanted to cut his salary. He signed on with the Sacramento franchise in the independent Trolley League. Henley also played for the Colusa Prune Pickers of the Trolley League in 1916.

Henley had a career record of 218–174 (.556) in the PCL.

== Later life ==
After he retired from baseball, Henley drove a school bus in Fruitridge Pocket, California. Henley died on July 9, 1929, during an operation.

Henley was inducted into the Pacific Coast League Hall of Fame in 2003.
