= Clay Christiansen =

American baseball player (born 1958)

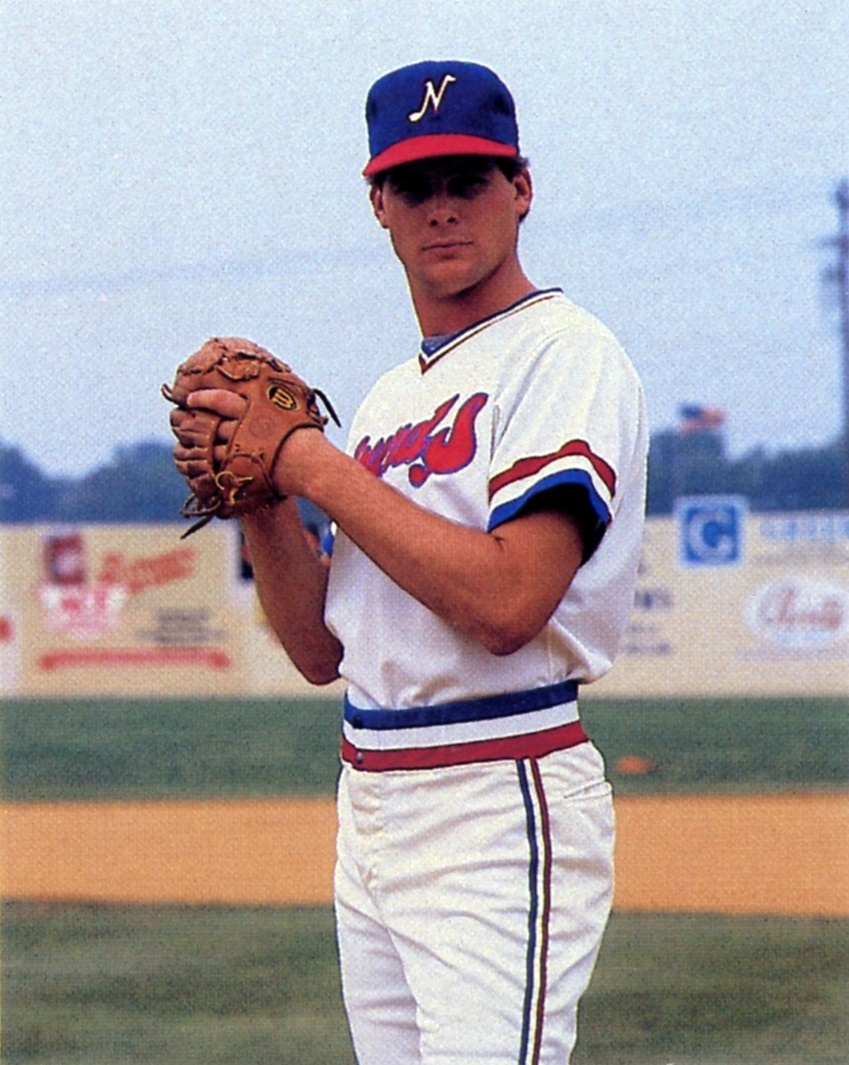
- Christiansen with the Nashville Sounds in 1982
- Pitcher
- Born: June 28, 1958 (age 68); Wichita, Kansas, U.S.
- Batted: Right Threw: Right

MLB debut
- May 10, 1984, for the New York Yankees

Last MLB appearance
- September 29, 1984, for the New York Yankees

MLB statistics
- Win–loss record: 2–4
- Earned run average: 6.05
- Strikeouts: 27
- Stats at Baseball Reference

Teams
- New York Yankees (1984)

Clay C. Christiansen (born June 28, 1958) is an American former professional baseball pitcher. He played in Major League Baseball (MLB) for the New York Yankees during the 1984 season. He was drafted by the Yankees in the 15th round of the 1980 amateur draft. Christiansen played his first professional season with their Class-A (Short Season) Oneonta Yankees in 1980, and his last with the Houston Astros' Triple-A Tucson Toros in 1988.

Christiansen graduated from Columbus Unified High School in Columbus, Kansas, in 1976. In addition to being an American Legion baseball standout, he was the quarterback of the football team, played basketball and participated in track and field. In his senior year he set a new school record for discus throwing.

After high school, Christiansen attended the University of Kansas in Lawrence, Kansas, where he was a member of the Jayhawks baseball team prior to embarking on his professional career.

== Life after baseball ==
Christiansen is married to local Kansas City sportscaster Karen Kornacki. He currently works for Pepsi in Olathe, Kansas as an install driver for the vending department.
