= Spider Baum =

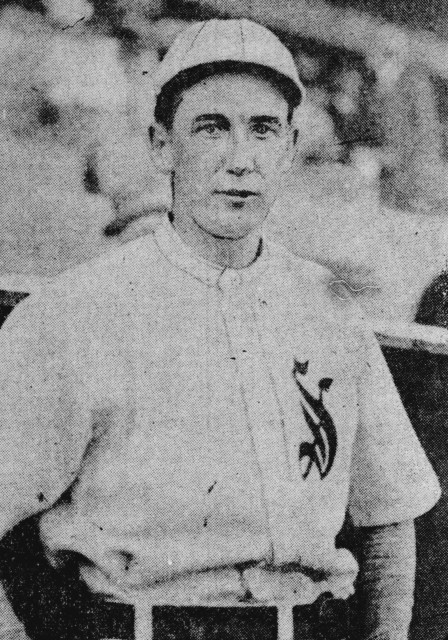
- Pitcher
- Born: May 28, 1882; San Francisco, California, U.S.
- Died: June 28, 1955 (aged 73); Renton, Washington, U.S.
- Batted: Right Threw: Right

Charles Adrian "Spider" Baum (May 28, 1882 – June 28, 1955) was an American professional baseball pitcher. He played for 19 years from 1902 to 1920, including 15 years in Pacific Coast League (PCL) with the Los Angeles Angels (1903–1905), Sacramento Sacts (1909–1912), Vernon/Venice Tigers (1912–1913), San Francisco Seals (1914–1919), Salt Lake City Bees (1919–1920). He compiled a career win–loss record of 302-250.

After the 1913 season, the Tigers traded Baum to the San Francisco Seals for Cack Henley and Roy McArdle. He won 30 games in 1915 and had nine seasons in which he won at least 20 games. When he retired after the 1920 season, he held the record with 261 wins in PCL games. His record was broken in 1934 by Frank Shellenback. He has been inducted into the Pacific Coast League Hall of Fame.

After retiring as a player, Baum became a baseball executive. He was the vice president and secretary of the Salt Lake City club in the late 1920s and continued in that role when the club moved west and became the Hollywood Stars. He later served as vice president of the San Diego Padres baseball club from 1937 to 1938 and president from 1938 to 1939.

Baum joined the Rohr Aircraft Corporation in 1940.

His son, Jack, was killed in September 1943 while participating in a bombing mission over Germany.

Baum died in 1955 in Renton, Washington, at age 73.
