= Jigger Statz =

American baseball player (1897–1988)

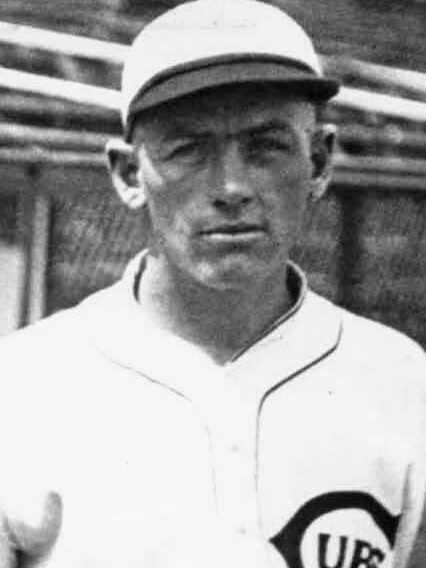
- Statz in 1922
- Outfielder
- Born: October 20, 1897; Waukegan, Illinois, U.S.
- Died: March 16, 1988 (aged 90); Corona del Mar, California, U.S.
- Batted: Right Threw: Right

MLB debut
- July 30, 1919, for the New York Giants

Last MLB appearance
- September 30, 1928, for the Brooklyn Robins

MLB statistics
- Batting average: .285
- Home runs: 17
- Runs batted in: 215
- Stats at Baseball Reference

Teams
- New York Giants (1919–1920); Boston Red Sox (1920); Chicago Cubs (1922–1925); Brooklyn Robins (1927–1928)

Arnold John "Jigger" Statz (October 20, 1897 – March 16, 1988) was an American professional baseball outfielder, manager and scout. He threw and batted right-handed and was listed as 5 feet 7 inches (1.70 m) tall and 150 pounds (68 kg).

Statz appeared in 683 games played in Major League Baseball, but had a lengthy and notable career for the Los Angeles Angels of the Pacific Coast League, playing in almost 2,800 games. As of 2021, he is one of only nine players known to have amassed at least 4,000 combined hits in professional baseball across all leagues (major, minor, and international).

== Early life ==
Arnold John Statz was born on October 20, 1897 in Waukegan, Illinois to John and Sarah (née Tooman) Statz. He was the middle child, with four sisters, and named for his father's brother. His father was a machinist and the son of German immigrants to the United States, while his mother was the daughter of Irish immigrants. The family briefly relocated to Alabama, where Statz was nicknamed "Chigger" for his small size.

At the age of 12, Statz relocated with his family to Worcester, Massachusetts, where his unfamiliar nickname was respelled as "Jigger." He began playing baseball in Worcester at St. Paul's School and Classical High School and worked at Worcester Country Club as a caddy. As a young man, Statz was more renowned for his golf than baseball, setting a course record at the club and competing for a national title. After enrolling at the College of the Holy Cross, where he played on successful teams for coach Jesse Burkett, he continued to make headlines for his golfing abilities.

Though he signed with the New York Giants in 1919, Statz continued his studies at Holy Cross and graduated with his class in 1921.

== Baseball career ==
=== New York Giants (1919–20) ===
Statz made his debut for the Giants on July 30, 1919. He hit .300 in his first season with 18 hits in 21 games and was compared to fellow rookie Frankie Frisch. In 1920, he started for the Giants in center field on Opening Day against the Boston Braves and had a strong game, going 2-for-4 with a triple and a two-RBI single. However, he struggled through June, when the Giants placed him on waivers with a batting average of .133.

=== Boston Red Sox (1920) ===
On June 7, 1920, Statz was claimed off waivers by the Boston Red Sox. He played sparingly and only had three at-bats before he was sold within weeks to the Los Angeles Angels of the Pacific Coast League. Initially, it appeared that he would only be sent to Los Angeles for additional experience before being called back to the Red Sox in the fall. However, Statz would play most of his remaining career with the Angels.

=== First stint with Los Angeles Angels (1920–21) ===
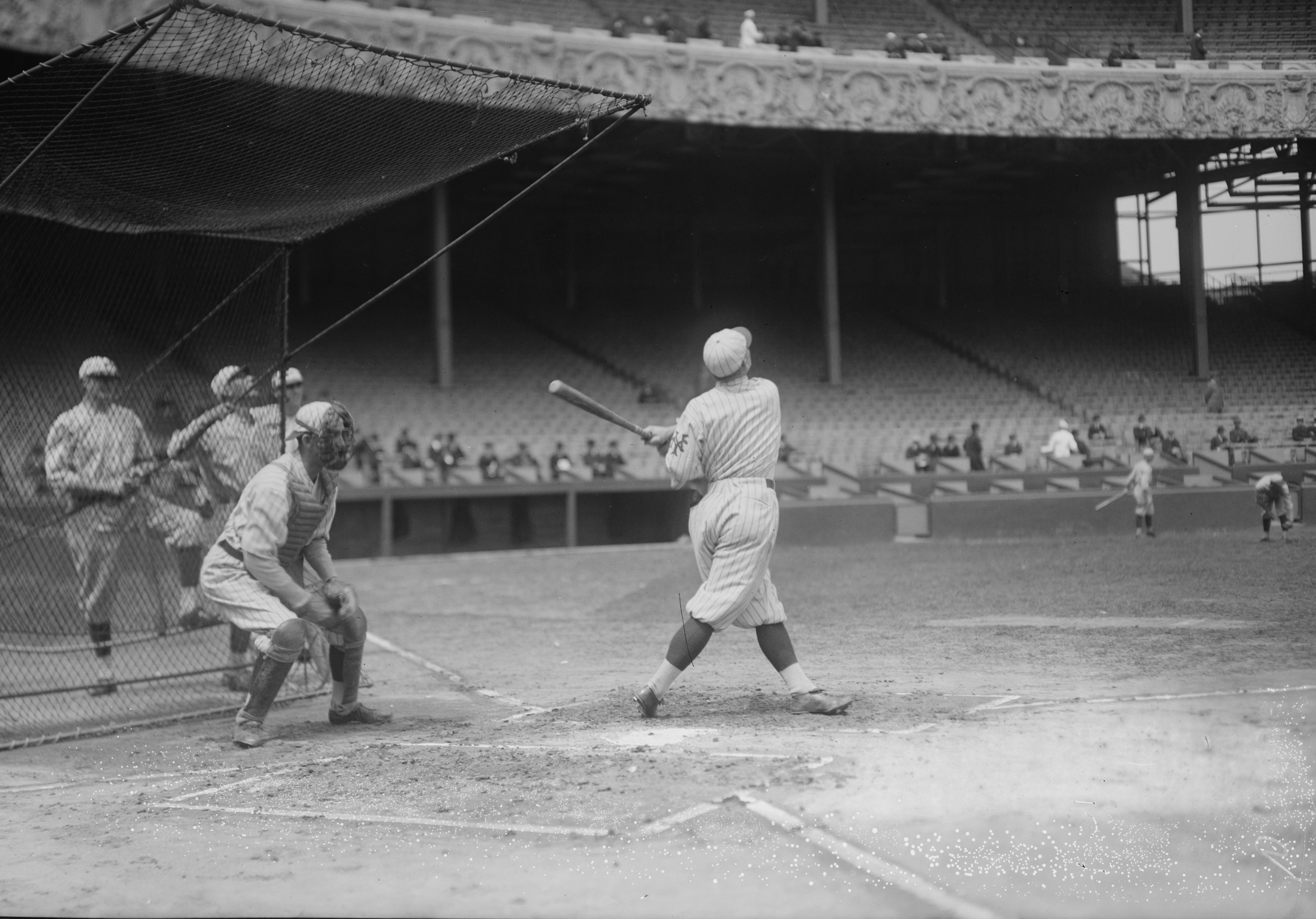
Statz taking batting practice for the New York Giants in 1920.

Statz played in 101 games for the Angels in 1920, hitting his first professional home run on August 1 in Seattle and batting .236. In 1921, he improved significantly, hitting .310 in 153 games and leading the league with 13 stolen bases. The Los Angeles Times referred to Statz as a "second Ty Cobb."

=== Chicago Cubs (1922–25) ===
Before the 1922, Statz and pitcher Vic Aldridge were traded to the Chicago Cubs (which were also owned by Angels owner William Wrigley) for five players and $50,000 cash. Statz played well in Chicago, hitting .293 before breaking his right wrist in a game against the Pittsburgh Pirates on July 5. After returning on August 8, he finished the season with a .297 batting average over 110 games.

In 1923, Statz had his best season in the major leagues, playing in all 154 games with a .319 batting average, 10 home runs and 70 runs batted in. He led the league in at-bats with 655. His statistics declined in 1924 and further in 1925, when he was given his unconditional release back to the Angels on May 30, after 38 games. After considering retirement to work in the insurance business, Statz joined the Angels in June 1925.

=== Second stint with Los Angeles Angels (1925–27) ===
Upon his return to the Angels for the remainder of the 1925 season, Statz hit only .264. He spent the offseason competing in numerous golf tournaments in the Los Angeles area, where he performed strongly. He returned to the Angels in strong form and won the 1926 Pacific Coast League Most Valuable Player award, hitting.364 and committing only two errors across 199 games. He led the league with 291 base hits, 18 triples, and 68 doubles. In mid-September, the rights to his contract was purchased by the Brooklyn Robins.

=== Brooklyn Robins (1927–28) ===
Before he joined the Robins for the 1927 season, the team attempted to unsuccessfully trade him to the Oakland Oaks for Buzz Arlett and rejected an offer from the Angels to buy him back for $8,000. He ultimately hit .274 and scored 64 runs, though he drove in only 21.

On May 3 and 4, Statz made two game-saving, ninth-inning catches against his former team and cross-town rivals, the Giants. In the first game, he caught a deep line drive from Ty Tyson, who represented the winning run, with one out and a runner on first. Fred Lieb of the New York Evening Post compared the catch to one made by Dode Paskert in the 1911 World Series as the second-best he had ever seen. In the second game, Statz corralled a 460-foot fly ball off the bat of pinch hitter Jack Cummings to preserve a tie; the Robins lost in extra innings.

Before the 1928 season, Statz held out for a larger contract, and the Robins placed him on waivers on March 3, leading him to end his holdout. He had limited playing time, backing up star hitter Max Carey in centerfield, and hit only .234 in 77 games. On December 11, his contract was sold to the Angels once again. Although he was widely regarded as the best defensive outfielder in the sport, the Robins hoped he would work on his hitting. However, Statz never played another game in the major leagues and finished his career by playing the next fourteen seasons for the Angels.

=== Los Angeles Angels (1929–42) ===
Returning to the Angels for the 1929 season, Statz was a consistent performer for the remainder of his career. He averaged more than 157 games per season and typically hit well over .300. During his final tenure with the team, he led the PCL in runs at least four times. The Angels won the championship in 1933 and 1934. They also won a pennant in 1938.

After the 1939 season, Statz was named player-manager. In his final season, 1942, he managed the Angels within one game of the PCL pennant. He was asked to resign, and he did so on October 6, ending his playing career.

=== Other baseball activities ===
While still for the Angels, Statz played himself in the 1929 Paramount film, Fast Company, which was remade in 1933 as Elmer, the Great. In 1952, he served as a technical advisor for The Winning Team, a fictionalized Warner Bros. biography of Grover Cleveland Alexander which starred Ronald Reagan.

In December 1946, he joined the Cubs organization as the team's professional West Coast scout. He reportedly scouted Lou Stringer and Lou Novikoff during a 25-year career as a scout for the organization. From 1948 to 1949, he also managed the Visalia Cubs.

In 1980, Statz was a panelist at the Society for American Baseball Research national convention in Los Angeles.

=== Legacy ===
Statz still holds numerous professional baseball records.

Statz is one of only nine players (along with Pete Rose, Ty Cobb, Ichiro Suzuki, Hank Aaron, Minnie Miñoso, Julio Franco, Derek Jeter, and Stan Musial) known to have recorded at least 4,000 hits in professional baseball across all leagues.

Statz was elected to the inaugural class of the Pacific Coast League Hall of Fame in 1943. As of 2026, he holds the PCL records for games played (2,790), hits (3,356), doubles (597), triples (136), and runs scored (1,996). He holds the American professional baseball records for runs scored (2,372) and outfield putouts (8,625), and only Pete Rose has played more games or taken more at-bats professionally in the United States than Statz.

== Personal life and death ==
Statz was married in 1921 in Los Angeles. His parents relocated to Los Angeles in 1939.

In early 1943, Statz served as personnel director for the Plomb Tool Company, which manufactured hand tools for the armed forces during World War II.

Statz died of prostate cancer on March 16, 1988 at his home in Corona del Mar, California.
