= Chad Hermansen =

American baseball player (born 1977)

- Outfielder
- Born: September 10, 1977 (age 47); Salt Lake City, Utah, U.S.
- Batted: Right Threw: Right

MLB debut
- September 7, 1999, for the Pittsburgh Pirates

Last MLB appearance
- April 17, 2004, for the Toronto Blue Jays

MLB statistics
- Batting average: .195
- Home runs: 13
- Runs batted in: 34
- Stats at Baseball Reference

Teams
- Pittsburgh Pirates (1999–2002); Chicago Cubs (2002); Los Angeles Dodgers (2003); Toronto Blue Jays (2004)

Chad Bruce Hermansen (born September 10, 1977) is an American former Major League Baseball outfielder.

== Career ==
Hermansen played amateur ball as a shortstop at Green Valley High School of Henderson, Nevada, and the Pittsburgh Pirates selected him in the first round of the June draft, with the tenth overall pick. After signing with the Pirates, Hermansen immediately emerged as a top prospect. He was a South Atlantic League All-Star in 1997, and after moving to the outfield the next year, a Pacific Coast League All Star and the Pirates' Minor League Player of the Year in 1999. He earned a promotion to the major leagues at the end of that season, and made his debut against the San Diego Padres on September 7, 1999.

Hermansen was viewed as the Pirates' center fielder of the future, but he struggled to establish himself and lost his starting job early in 2000. He spent parts of the next three seasons bouncing back and forth between the Pirates and Triple-A, and then was traded to the Chicago Cubs for Darren Lewis on July 31, 2002. Lewis chose to retire rather than report to the Pirates, so the teams made a follow-up trade involving minor league players Aron Weston, Ricardo Palma, and Tim Lavery two weeks later. Hermansen spent the remainder of the season with the Cubs, and then was traded to the Los Angeles Dodgers on December 4. The Cubs received Eric Karros and Mark Grudzielanek, while the Dodgers also received Todd Hundley. Hermansen played in eleven games for the Dodgers in 2003, and appeared in four more with the Toronto Blue Jays the following year.

Signed by the Campeche Pirates of the Mexican League in 2005, Hermansen was released after batting only .182 in eleven games. He next signed with the Elmira Pioneers, but played in no games before being signed by the San Diego Padres organization. The Padres immediately released Hermansen, however, citing arm problems as their concern. In 2006, Hermansen played for the Sioux Falls Canaries of the newly formed American Association.

Hermansen began the 2007 season playing for the Albuquerque Isotopes, the Triple-A affiliate of the Florida Marlins, though he was not on the Marlins' 40-man roster. He was acquired by the New York Mets on August 7 for a player to be named later. Hermansen signed a minor league contract with the Los Angeles Angels of Anaheim during the 07-08 offseason, but was released during spring training.

Hermansen is now an instructor at the Frozen Ropes Training Center in Henderson, NV. He is a member of the Latter-day Saint church and is married with 4 children. He also works for the NCSA (the National Collegiate Scouting Association). As of the 2015 season, he is an area scout for the Angels.
