= Rube Vickers =

American baseball player (1879–1958)

- Pitcher
- Born: May 17, 1879; Hillsdale, Michigan, U.S.
- Died: December 9, 1958 (aged 79); Belleville, Michigan, U.S.
- Batted: Left Threw: Right

MLB debut
- September 21, 1902, for the Cincinnati Reds

Last MLB appearance
- October 2, 1909, for the Philadelphia Athletics

MLB statistics
- Win–loss record: 22–27
- Earned run average: 2.93
- Strikeouts: 213
- Stats at Baseball Reference

Teams
- Cincinnati Reds (1902); Brooklyn Superbas (1903); Philadelphia Athletics (1907–1909)

Harry Porter "Rube" Vickers (May 17, 1879 – December 9, 1958) was an American professional baseball pitcher who played in Major League Baseball for the Brooklyn Superbas, Cincinnati Reds, and Philadelphia Athletics during the early 20th century. He holds numerous Pacific Coast League single-season pitching records, as well as the modern-era National League record for most passed balls in a game as a catcher.

== Professional career ==
=== Early career ===
Vickers started his career in organized professional baseball in 1900, when he played for the Toledo Mud Hens and the New Castle Quakers of the Interstate League. Two years later, he appeared as a pitcher for the Rock Island Islanders and the Terre Haute Hottentots of the Illinois-Indiana-Iowa League.

=== Cincinnati Reds ===
Near the end of the 1902 season, Vickers started three games for the Cincinnati Reds, each resulting in a complete game loss. He struck out six and walked eight, and posted a 6.00 earned run average (ERA) in 21 innings pitched.

Cincinnati's last game of 1902 was scheduled for October 4 against the Pittsburgh Pirates, who had clinched the National League pennant. Although the weather was rainy and the field was muddy and wet, Pirates owner Barney Dreyfuss insisted on playing the game, wanting his team to set a record by winning 103 games. In protest, Reds manager Joe Kelley submitted a lineup card with his players out of position, including Rube Vickers at catcher. Vickers caught two innings, during which he set the single-game modern-era MLB record for passed balls with six, a mark which has since been tied but not surpassed. He was replaced after two innings by Heinie Peitz, an actual catcher, but the Pirates had taken a 7–1 lead and went on to win the game.

=== Brooklyn Superbas ===
On February 17, 1903, the Reds sold Vickers to the Brooklyn Superbas. He appeared in 5 games for Brooklyn, four as a pitcher and one as a center fielder, and had a 10.93 ERA in 14 innings.

=== Return to the minor leagues ===
While not playing for the Superbas in 1903, Vickers pitched for the Holyoke Paperweights of the Connecticut League, with whom he threw 287 innings and had a 22–10 win–loss record. He pitched for the Paperweights again in 1904, and recorded 17 wins and 10 losses in 239 innings.

Vickers began the 1905 season with Holyoke as well, and went 11–7 in 171 innings for the Paperweights. However, he also played for a team that represented the independent Northern New York League in Burlington, Vermont, which earned him the nickname "Kangaroo" (for what fans considered "contract jumping"). Midway through the season, he was acquired by the Seattle Siwashes of the Pacific Coast League (PCL). In his first year with Seattle, Vickers posted a 12–6 win–loss record and a 1.83 ERA in 157 2/3 innings.

Vickers played the entire 1906 season with the Siwashes, during which he set several Pacific Coast League records. He pitched in a record 64 games, during which he threw over 500 innings, which is both a PCL record and the highest total for any pitcher in organized baseball in the modern era. Vickers' win–loss record was 39–20; his 39 victories led the league and are tied with Doc Newton for the PCL record. He struck out over 400 batters, which led the league and set another PCL record. In addition, Vickers led the league with 11 shutouts.

In 1907, Vickers moved to the Williamsport Millionaires of the Tri-State League. In 39 games, he had 25 wins, which led the league. After their season ended, Vickers was signed by the Philadelphia Athletics.

=== Philadelphia Athletics ===
Vickers pitched in 10 games for the Athletics in 1907. On October 5, he achieved the feat of winning two games in one day in a doubleheader against the Washington Senators. Vickers pitched 11 1/3 scoreless innings of relief in the first game, which Philadelphia won 4–2, and pitched a perfect five innings in the second game, a 4–0 Philadelphia victory that was shortened due to darkness. These were his only two wins for the Athletics that season, which he finished with a 3.40 ERA (below average according to ERA+) in 50 1/3 innings.

In 1908, Vickers served as the workhorse of the Athletics pitching staff. He pitched 317 innings over 53 games (34 starts) and led the Athletics in both wins and losses with a 18–19 record. His ERA was 2.21, and he led the American League with 17 games finished.

Vickers could not repeat his success in 1909. He appeared in just 18 games for the Athletics, winning two games and losing two. Vickers recorded his second win of the season, and the last of his major league career, on October 2, 1909, the final day of the season, in the second game of a doubleheader against the Washington Senators.

=== Later career ===
After the 1909 season, Athletics manager Connie Mack sent Vickers to the Baltimore Orioles of the Eastern League. In 1910, he had 25 wins for the Orioles, but also led the league with 24 losses. In 1911, Vickers led the Eastern League with 32 wins and 369 innings pitched. In 1912, he had a 13–14 win–loss record in 43 games.

Vickers pitched in five games for the Jersey City Skeeters in 1914.

Vickers managed the Kalamazoo Celery Pickers of the Central League for part of the 1920 season.

== See also ==
- List of Pacific Coast League records
