= Passed ball =

Baseball statistic

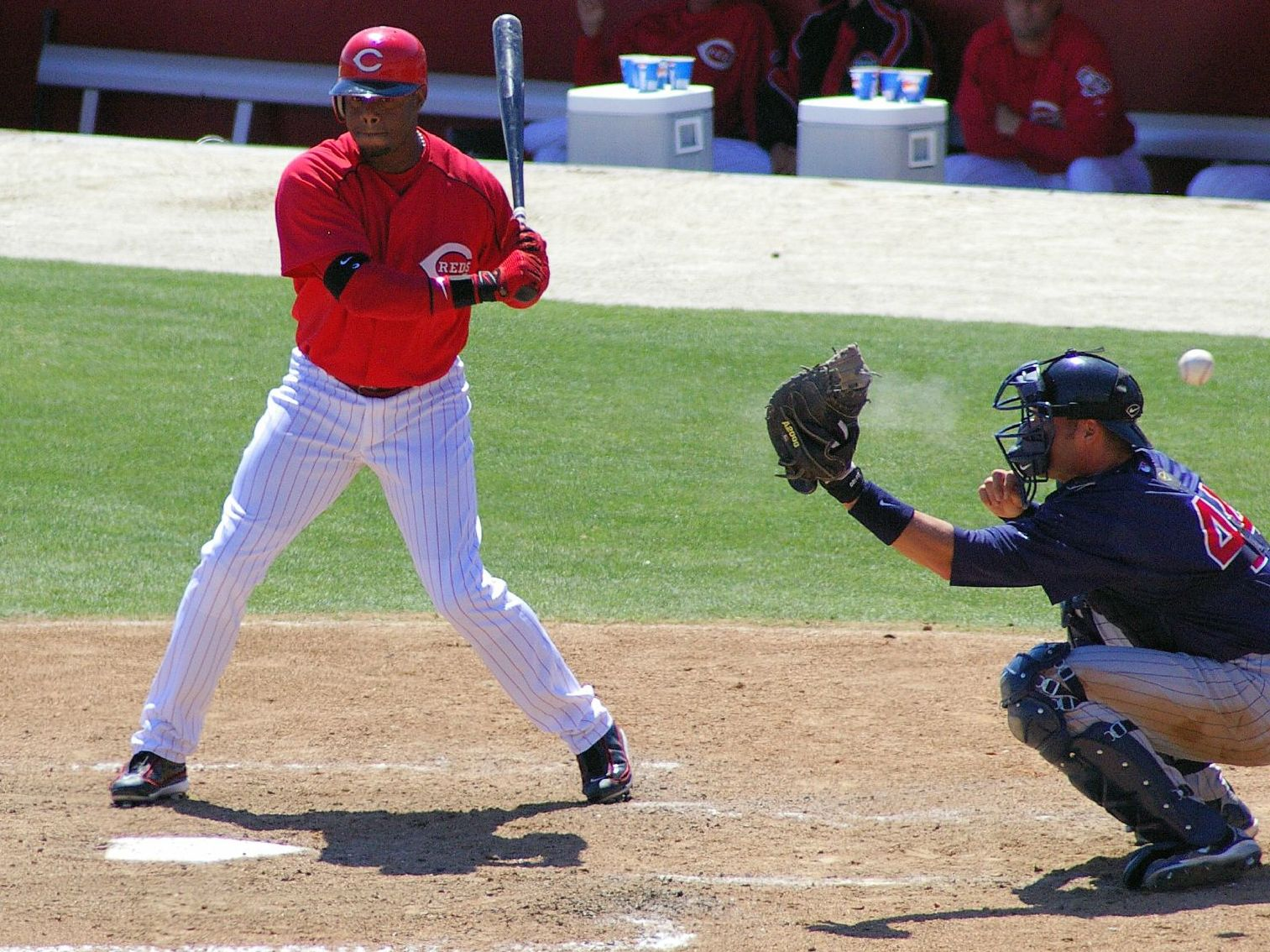
Rob Bowen (right) of the Minnesota Twins allows a pitch to deflect off his glove during a 2006 spring training game

In baseball, a catcher is charged with a passed ball when he fails to hold or control a legally pitched ball that, with ordinary effort, should have been maintained under his control, and, as a result of this loss of control, the batter or a runner on base advances. A runner who advances due to a passed ball is not credited with a stolen base unless he breaks for the base before the pitcher begins his delivery.

== History ==
A passed ball may be scored when a base runner reaches the next base on a bobble or missed catch by the catcher, or when the batter–runner reaches first base on an uncaught strike three (see also Strikeout).

A closely related statistic is the wild pitch. As with many baseball statistics, whether a pitch that gets away from a catcher is a passed ball or wild pitch is at the discretion of the official scorer. Typically, pitches that are deemed to be ordinarily catchable by the catcher, but are not, are ruled passed balls; pitches that get by the catcher that are thought to have required extraordinary effort by the catcher in order to stop them are wild pitches. If the pitch was so low as to touch the ground, or so high that the catcher has to rise out of his crouched position to get to it, or so wide that the catcher has to lunge for it, it is usually then considered a wild pitch and not a passed ball.

A run scored due to a passed ball is not recorded as an earned run. However, a run scored due to a wild pitch is recorded as an earned run.

Passed balls and wild pitches are considered to be part of the act of pitching rather than fielding. Thus they are kept as separate statistics and are not recorded as errors.

There tends to be a higher incidence of passed balls when a knuckleballer is pitching. The physics that make a knuckleball so difficult to hit make it similarly difficult to catch. While teams with a knuckleballer on their pitching staff often employ a special "knuckleball catcher" who is equipped with a knuckleball mitt, similar to a first baseman's glove, it is still extremely difficult to catch.

== Records ==
The MLB career record for passed balls allowed is 763 by Pop Snyder, while Rudy Kemmler set the single season record of 114 in 1883. The single season record in the modern era is 35, set by Geno Petralli in 1987. The record for passed balls in a single game, six, was set by Rube Vickers in 1902 and later tied by Petralli in 1987 and Jerry Goff in 1996. The record for passed balls in a single inning is four, and is jointly held by Petralli, Ray Katt, and Ryan Lavarnway, all three of whom were catching knuckleball pitchers (Charlie Hough, Hoyt Wilhelm, and Steven Wright, respectively).

== See also ==
- Bye (cricket) – cricket term for an unhit, uncaught ball
