= 1964 in baseball =

The following are the baseball events of the year 1964 throughout the world.

== Champions ==
=== Major League Baseball ===
- World Series: St. Louis Cardinals over New York Yankees (4–3); Bob Gibson, MVP
- All-Star Game, July 7 at Shea Stadium: National League, 7–4; Johnny Callison, MVP

=== Other champions ===
- College World Series: Minnesota
- Japan Series: Nankai Hawks over Hanshin Tigers (4–3)
- Little League World Series: Mid Island, Staten Island, New York
- Senior League World Series: Massapequa, New York

== Awards and honors ==
- Baseball Hall of Fame
  - Luke Appling
  - Red Faber
  - Burleigh Grimes
  - Tim Keefe
  - Heinie Manush
  - John Ward
  - Miller Huggins (manager)

Baseball Writers' Association of America Awards
BBWAA Award	National League	American League
Rookie of the Year	Dick Allen (PHI)	Tony Oliva (MIN)
Cy Young Award	—	Dean Chance (LAA)
Most Valuable Player	Ken Boyer (STL)	Brooks Robinson (BAL)
Gold Glove Awards
Position	National League	American League
Pitcher	Bobby Shantz (PHI/CHC/STL)	Jim Kaat (MIN)
Catcher	Johnny Edwards (CIN)	Elston Howard (NYY)
1st Base	Bill White (STL)	Vic Power (PHI (Note: Power was traded from the Angels to NL team Philadelphia Phillies on September 9, 1964.)/LAA/MIN)
2nd Base	Bill Mazeroski (PIT)	Bobby Richardson (NYY)
3rd Base	Ron Santo (CHC)	Brooks Robinson (BAL)
Shortstop	Rubén Amaro (PHI)	Luis Aparicio (BAL)
Outfield	Roberto Clemente (PIT)	Vic Davalillo (CLE)
Outfield	Curt Flood (STL)	Al Kaline (DET)
Outfield	Willie Mays (SF)	Jim Landis (CWS)

== Statistical leaders ==
	American League		National League	
Stat	Player	Total	Player	Total
AVG	Tony Oliva (MIN)	.323	Roberto Clemente (PIT)	.339
HR	Harmon Killebrew (MIN)	49	Willie Mays (SF)	47
RBI	Brooks Robinson (BAL)	118	Ken Boyer (STL)	119
W	Dean Chance (LAA) Gary Peters (CWS)	20	Larry Jackson (CHC)	24
ERA	Dean Chance (LAA)	1.65	Sandy Koufax (LAD)	1.74
K	Al Downing (NYY)	217	Bob Veale (PIT)	250

== Major league baseball final standings ==
=== American League final standings ===
American League
Team	W	L	Pct.	GB	Home	Road
New York Yankees	99	63	.611	—	50‍–‍31	49‍–‍32
Chicago White Sox	98	64	.605	1	52‍–‍29	46‍–‍35
Baltimore Orioles	97	65	.599	2	49‍–‍32	48‍–‍33
Detroit Tigers	85	77	.525	14	46‍–‍35	39‍–‍42
Los Angeles Angels	82	80	.506	17	45‍–‍36	37‍–‍44
Cleveland Indians	79	83	.488	20	41‍–‍40	38‍–‍43
Minnesota Twins	79	83	.488	20	40‍–‍41	39‍–‍42
Boston Red Sox	72	90	.444	27	45‍–‍36	27‍–‍54
Washington Senators	62	100	.383	37	31‍–‍50	31‍–‍50
Kansas City Athletics	57	105	.352	42	26‍–‍55	31‍–‍50

Locations of teams for the 1962–1964 American League seasons
American League

=== National League final standings ===
National League
Team	W	L	Pct.	GB	Home	Road
St. Louis Cardinals	93	69	.574	—	48‍–‍33	45‍–‍36
Philadelphia Phillies	92	70	.568	1	46‍–‍35	46‍–‍35
Cincinnati Reds	92	70	.568	1	47‍–‍34	45‍–‍36
San Francisco Giants	90	72	.556	3	44‍–‍37	46‍–‍35
Milwaukee Braves	88	74	.543	5	45‍–‍36	43‍–‍38
Pittsburgh Pirates	80	82	.494	13	42‍–‍39	38‍–‍43
Los Angeles Dodgers	80	82	.494	13	41‍–‍40	39‍–‍42
Chicago Cubs	76	86	.469	17	40‍–‍41	36‍–‍45
Houston Colt .45s	66	96	.407	27	41‍–‍40	25‍–‍56
New York Mets	53	109	.327	40	33‍–‍48	20‍–‍61

Locations of teams for the 1964 National League season
National League

== Nippon Professional Baseball final standings ==
=== Central League final standings ===
Central League	G	W	L	T	Pct.	GB
Hanshin Tigers	140	80	56	4	.588	—
Taiyo Whales	140	80	58	2	.580	1.0
Yomiuri Giants	140	71	69	0	.507	11.0
Hiroshima Carp	140	64	73	3	.467	16.5
Kokutetsu Swallows	140	61	74	5	.452	18.5
Chunichi Dragons	140	57	83	0	.407	25.0

=== Pacific League final standings ===
Pacific League	G	W	L	T	Pct.	GB
Nankai Hawks	150	84	63	3	.571	—
Hankyu Braves	150	79	65	6	.549	3.5
Toei Flyers	150	78	68	4	.534	5.5
Tokyo Orions	150	77	68	5	.531	6.0
Nishitetsu Lions	150	63	81	6	.438	19.5
Kintetsu Buffaloes	150	55	91	4	.377	28.5

== Events ==
=== January ===
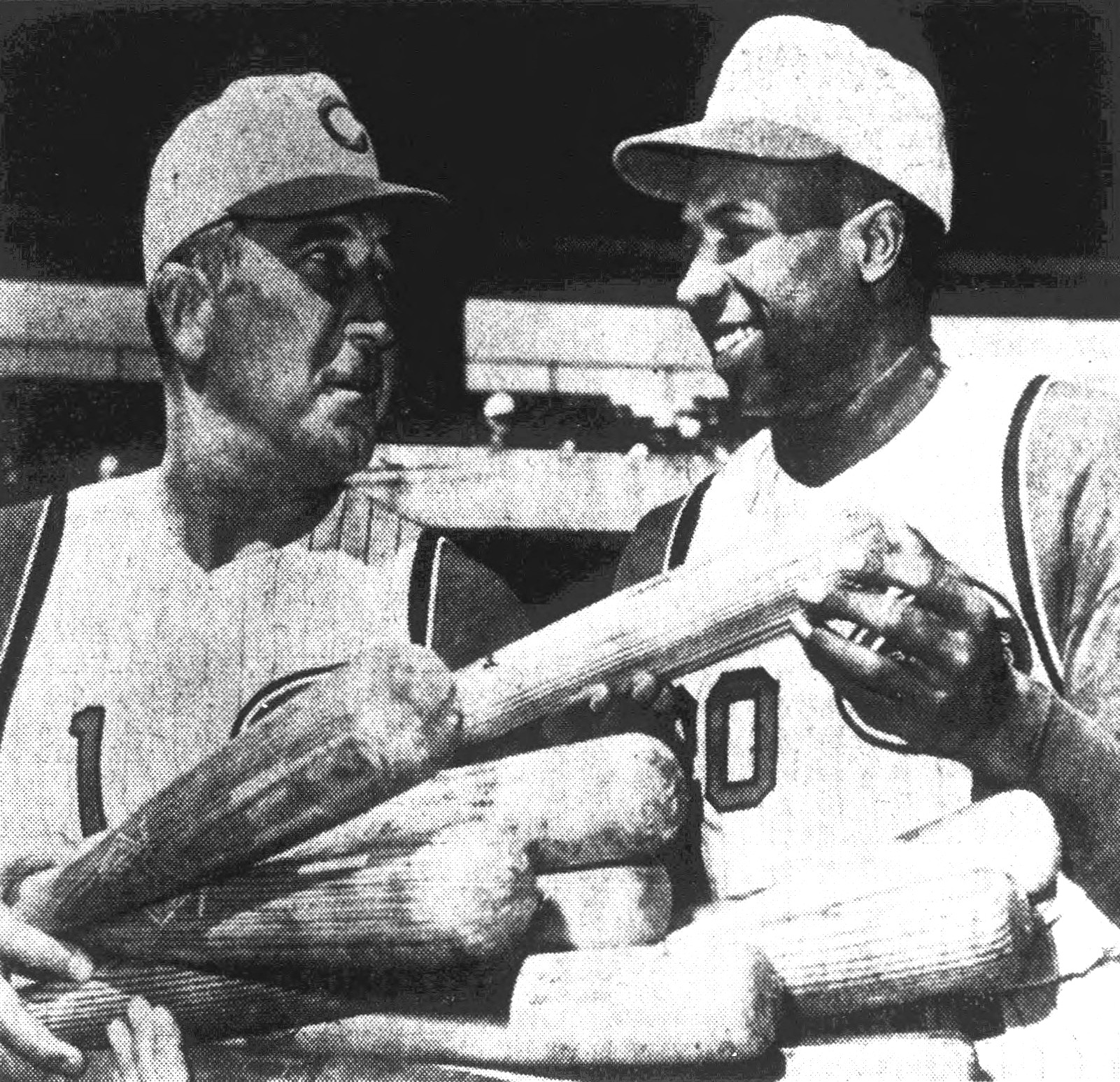
Fred Hutchinson (#1) with future Hall of Famer Frank Robinson in 1963

- January 3 – The Cincinnati Reds announce that manager Fred Hutchinson, 44, has contracted lung cancer; at a news conference in his native city of Seattle, the former MLB pitcher says he will begin two months of radiology treatment immediately and plans to be ready when the Reds' spring training camp opens in Florida on February 29.
- January 6:
  - Owner Charlie Finley signs a two-year pact to move his Athletics‚ pending American League approval‚ from Kansas City, Missouri to Louisville, Kentucky.
  - The Chicago White Sox introduce their new powder-blue road uniforms.
- January 9 – The Philadelphia Phillies release first baseman Frank Torre.
- January 14 – The Pittsburgh Pirates sign pitcher Dock Ellis as a free agent.
- January 15 – Willie Mays‚ the highest-paid player in baseball‚ signs a $105‚000 contract with the Giants.
- January 16 – American League owners vote 9–1 against Charlie Finley's attempt to move his club to Louisville. Finley is given an ultimatum to sign a lease in Kansas City or lose his franchise.
- January 20 – The Houston Colt .45s acquire veteran shortstop Eddie Kasko from the Cincinnati Reds for pitchers Jim Dickson and Wally Wolf, plus cash considerations.
- January 28 – Cincinnati center fielder Vada Pinson is cleared of assault charges stemming from a September 5‚ 1963 incident when local sportswriter Earl Lawson does not pursue charges further.
- January 29 – Pitcher-author Jim Brosnan is given permission by the Chicago White Sox to make his own deal with another team. His in-season writing has been censured by Sox general manager Ed Short.
- January 30 – The United States Senate Subcommittee on Monopolies begins hearings on baseball.

=== February ===
- February 2 – Red Faber, Burleigh Grimes, Tim Keefe, Heinie Manush, John Montgomery Ward, and Miller Huggins are elected to the Baseball Hall of Fame by the Special Veterans Committee.
- February 13 – Chicago Cubs second baseman Ken Hubbs, 22, a novice pilot and 1962's National League Rookie of the Year and NL Gold Glove winner, dies when his private plane crashes in a snowstorm near Provo, Utah. His body is recovered two days later; pallbearers at his February 20 funeral include Cubs' stars and future Hall of Famers Ernie Banks and Ron Santo.
- February 17:
  - Former Chicago White Sox shortstop Luke Appling is selected to the Hall of Fame by the Baseball Writers' Association of America in a runoff election. In 1953, the first year of eligibility for Appling, he received just two votes.
  - The St. Louis Cardinals reacquire outfielder Carl Warwick from the Houston Colt .45s for pitcher Chuck Taylor and outfielder Jim Beauchamp. Warwick will help the Redbirds win the 1964 World Series, setting a Fall Classic record for reaching first base consecutively as a pinch hitter.

=== March ===
- March 18 – Bolstering their bullpen, the Chicago White Sox acquire 35-year-old left-hander Don Mossi from the Detroit Tigers in a cash transaction.
- March 22 – The Milwaukee Braves sign outfielder Cito Gaston as an amateur free agent.
- March 23:
  - Finally, Charlie Finley gives in to American League pressure and signs a four-year lease with the municipal government to keep the Athletics in Kansas City. Finley wanted a two-year deal. His exasperated AL colleagues voted 9–1 that KC's offer was reasonable.
  - The San Francisco Giants sign pitcher Masanori Murakami‚ third baseman Tatsuhiko Tanaka‚ and catcher Hiroshi Takahashi, the first Japanese ballplayers ever to play for American teams. Murakami will play for the Fresno Giants and later the MLB Giants, while Tanaka and Takahashi play for the Magic Valley Cowboys.
- March 31:
  - The Washington Senators acquire pitcher Buster Narum from the Baltimore Orioles for a "player to be named later"/PTBNL, who turns out to be 20-year-old outfield prospect Lou Piniella.
  - The Chicago White Sox sell the contract of pitcher Mike Joyce to the New York Mets.

=== April ===
- April 1 – Cleveland Indians manager Birdie Tebbetts suffers a heart attack. Third-base coach George Strickland will fill in for three months until the 51-year old skipper returns to the team with limited duties.
- April 8 – Houston Colt .45s relief pitcher Jim Umbricht dies of cancer at the age of 33. In 1965, the franchise will retire his uniform number 32.
- April 9:
  - The Los Angeles Dodgers acquire well-traveled minor-league outfielder Lou Johnson from the Detroit Tigers' organization for relief pitcher and 1959 World Series hero Larry Sherry. Detroit even sends the Dodgers $10,000 in cash to sweeten the deal. To this point in his 12-season professional baseball career, Johnson, 29, has appeared in only 96 MLB games. But he will be recalled to the Dodgers in May 1965 to replace an injured Tommy Davis and help Los Angeles win two NL pennants and the 1965 World Series.
  - To the chagrin of special consultant Branch Rickey, the St. Louis Cardinals trade Jimmie Coker and Gary Kolb to the Milwaukee Braves for reserve catcher Bob Uecker. After introducing himself, the Redbirds' new backstop is quickly informed by Rickey. "I didn't want you. I wouldn't trade one Gary Kolb for a hundred Bob Ueckers".
- April 10 – Demolition of the Polo Grounds in Manhattan begins, using the same wrecking ball that demolished Ebbets Field in Brooklyn four years earlier.
- April 13:
  - Lyndon Johnson, the 36th U.S. President, throws out the ceremonial first pitch in 1964's traditional Presidential Opener before 40,145 at District of Columbia Stadium. The home-standing Washington Senators can muster only one hit, a third inning double by Claude Osteen, off Ken McBride and Julio Navarro, and fall to the Los Angeles Angels 4–0.
  - After beating the Reds 6–3 in the traditional home opener in Cincinnati, the Houston Colt .45s sit in first place in the National League for the only time under their original nickname. The next year the Colt .45s are renamed the Astros, to reflect Houston's status as the home of the NASA space program.
- April 14:
  - Sandy Koufax of the Los Angeles Dodgers goes all the way in his only Opening Day start, allowing no walks and beating the visiting St. Louis Cardinals, 4–0. Frank Howard homers for the Dodgers.
  - Meanwhile, the New York Mets sell the contract of 1950s Dodger legend Duke Snider, 37, to the San Francisco Giants. Snider will spend the last year of his 18-season, Hall-of-Fame MLB career with the arch-rival Giants, batting .210 largely as a pinch hitter.
- April 17 – The Mets play their first game at brand-new Shea Stadium and lose 4–3 to the Pittsburgh Pirates before 48,736. Willie Stargell hits the first home run in the stadium's history, a second-inning solo shot off the Mets' Jack Fisher. In the first-ever "Kiner's Korner" from Shea, Ralph Kiner's guest is Casey Stengel. Two days later, the Mets win their first of 1,859 victories at the stadium when they beat the Pirates 6–0 behind Al Jackson's six-hitter.
- April 21 – The Philadelphia Phillies purchase the contract of veteran relief pitcher Ed Roebuck from the Washington Senators. Roebuck, 32, will bolster the Phils' bullpen this season, working in 60 games and posting a 5–3 (2.21) record with 12 saves.
- April 23:
  - At Colt Stadium, Ken Johnson of the Houston Colt .45s no-hits his former team, the Cincinnati Reds, but loses 1–0. Two ninth-inning errors allow the Reds to score the game's lone run: a two-base throwing error by Johnson himself on Pete Rose's ground ball, and the second by Nellie Fox on Vada Pinson's grounder, which scores Rose. To date, the game is the only one in Major League history whose losing pitcher had pitched a nine-inning no-hitter. The no-hitter is the first of three in MLB this season—all of them thrown by National League hurlers.
  - The New York Mets pick up third baseman Charley Smith, 26, from the Chicago White Sox for shortstop Humberto "Chico" Fernández, minor-league catcher Bobby Catton, and cash.
- April 24 – Willie Mays reaches base five times in five plate appearances—two singles, two bases on balls, and a solo homer—and scores five runs in the San Francisco Giants' 15–5 romp over the Reds at Crosley Field.
- April 28 – The Los Angeles Angels acquire left-handed pitcher Willie Smith from the Detroit Tigers for right-hander Julio Navarro. An exceptional hitter among pitchers, Smith, 25, will become a full-time outfielder by mid-June to get his bat into the Angel lineup; he'll post a .301 batting average, best among the team's regulars, with 108 hits this season and remain a valuable outfielder and pinch hitter for the rest of his MLB career.

=== May ===
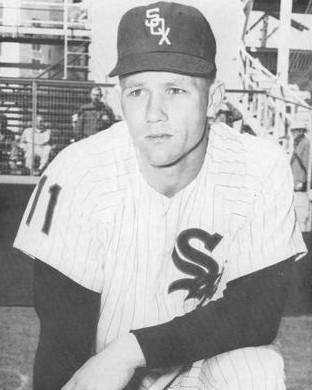
Dave Nicholson, who hit a 573 foot home run on May 6 which cleared the left field roof of Comiskey Park

- May 2 – The Minnesota Twins become the third club in MLB history to hit four consecutive home runs in the same inning, as Tony Oliva, Bob Allison, Jimmie Hall and Harmon Killebrew go deep in the top of the 11th inning in a 7–3 victory against the Kansas City Athletics. The Twins also become the first team to hit at least three consecutive home runs in an extra innings game. The Twins' six homers on the day (an accomplishment they'll match just 12 days from now, on May 14, in a nine-inning contest) are the most by a big-league team in one game in 1964.
- May 5 – Rookie right-hander Wally Bunker of the Baltimore Orioles pitches a one-hitter in the first start and second-ever appearance of his MLB career, defeating the Washington Senators 2–1 at Memorial Stadium. The Senators' lone hit belongs to Chuck Hinton, in the fourth inning, when Washington scores its lone run on an RBI groundout by Bill Skowron. Bunker, 19, will throw another one-hitter on July 3 against Kansas City, authoring two of MLB's 15 one-hit complete games of 1964. He is en route to a 19–5 (2.69) freshman campaign and a second-place finish in the American League Rookie of the Year voting.
- May 6 – Dave Nicholson of the Chicago White Sox hits a home run off of Athletics' pitcher Moe Drabowsky which either bounces atop and over the left-field roof of Comiskey Park or is said to have entirely cleared it. The home run is officially measured at 573 feet, one of baseball's longest of all time.
- May 8 – The Milwaukee Braves trade veteran shortstop Roy McMillan, 34, a three-time former Gold Glove Award winner, to the New York Mets for pitcher Jay Hook and outfielder Adrian Garrett (player to be named later/PTBNL).
- May 12 – The Braves release outfielder Gus Bell, 35, a four-time former NL All-Star and 15-year veteran.
- May 26:
  - Journeyman outfielder Jim King of the Washington Senators becomes the first of four major-leaguers to hit for the cycle in 1964; however, Washington falls to the Boston Red Sox 3–2 at Fenway Park. The Red Sox' starting pitcher, Earl Wilson, pitches a complete game win despite King's achievement.
  - The New York Mets find themselves on the right side of a "laugher," humbling the Chicago Cubs 19–1 at Wrigley Field. Their 23 hits and 19 runs set MLB team highs for 1964, while their victory margin is the greatest to date in the club's two-plus year history.
- May 31 – The second game of a doubleheader at Shea Stadium between the Mets and San Francisco Giants lasts 23 innings and an MLB-record seven hours and 23 minutes. The Giants eventually win it 8–6, on a two-run double by pinch hitter Del Crandall. The winning pitcher is future Hall of Famer Gaylord Perry, who throws ten shutout innings of relief. The doubleheader (swept by the Giants) clocks in at nine hours, 52 minutes of play—also the longest in MLB annals.

=== June ===
Hall of Famer Sandy Koufax

- June 2:
  - Lew Burdette's tenure with the St. Louis Cardinals lasts less than a calendar year when the 37-year-old hurler is dealt to the Chicago Cubs for fellow righty Glen Hobbie, 28. Each club will add a "PTBNL", outfielders Corky Withrow and Bob Will, to complete the transaction.
  - The New York Yankees sign 18-year-old amateur free agent shortstop Bobby Murcer, after a standout schoolboy career at Oklahoma City's Southeast High School.
- June 4 – Sandy Koufax pitches the third of his four career no hitters, to pace the Los Angeles Dodgers to a 3–0 victory over the Philadelphia Phillies at Connie Mack Stadium.
- June 8 – The Kansas City Athletics sign pitcher Catfish Hunter, 18, as an amateur free agent out of Perquimans County High School in North Carolina.
- June 10 – Eddie Lopat, manager of the last-place Kansas City Athletics (17–35), is fired and replaced by coach Mel McGaha.
- June 11 – Three American League teams make a tri-cornered trade in which the Minnesota Twins obtain second baseman Jerry Kindall and utilityman Frank Kostro, the Los Angeles Angels receive first baseman Vic Power and outfielder Lenny Green, and the Cleveland Indians get 2x AL All-Star second baseman Billy Moran.
- June 12 – The New York Mets sign 19-year-old southpaw Tug McGraw as an amateur free agent.
- June 15:
  - The Chicago Cubs trade outfielder Lou Brock and pitchers Jack Spring and Paul Toth to the St. Louis Cardinals for pitchers Ernie Broglio and Bobby Shantz and outfielder Doug Clemens. The swap eventually gains notoriety as perhaps the most lopsided in the history of baseball, as Brock goes on to a Hall of Fame career in St. Louis, while Broglio posts a 7–19 record in a Cubs uniform. Brock also is a key cog in the Redbirds' 1964 and 1967 World Series titles, and their 1968 NL championship.
  - The Minnesota Twins acquire right-hander Jim "Mudcat" Grant from the Cleveland Indians for pitcher Lee Stange and third baseman George Banks. Grant will win 21 games at the top of a pennant-winning starting rotation for the 1965 Twins.
- June 16 – Ken Boyer hits for the cycle in the Cardinals' 7–1 road victory over the Houston Colt .45s. The All-Star third baseman (and soon-to-be NL MVP) drives in three runs. Playing right field, Lou Brock starts his first game for St. Louis and goes two-for-three with a stolen base and run scored.
- June 22 – For the second time in nine days, the New York Yankees sweep a series from the Chicago White Sox, who are vying for the American League lead with the Bombers and Baltimore Orioles. Today, New York completes a four-game sweep at Comiskey Park after earlier taking all five contests of their series at Yankee Stadium from June 12–14 (which included two doubleheaders). The mid-season disaster will haunt the White Sox, who will finish just one game behind the Yankees when this season's pennant race concludes October 4.
- June 21 – On Father's Day at Shea Stadium, Jim Bunning fans ten, drives in two runs, and pitches the first perfect game (excluding Don Larsen's 1956 World Series effort, and Harvey Haddix's 1959 extra-innings loss) since Charlie Robertson's on April 30, 1922, as the Philadelphia Phillies beat the New York Mets 6–0. Bunning also becomes the first pitcher to throw no-hitters in both leagues, and Gus Triandos becomes the first catcher to catch a no-hitter in each league. Bunning throws just 90 pitches in winning his second no-hitter. The next time Bunning faces the Mets he will shut them out, the first no-hit pitcher in the 20th century to do that. The Mets fare little better in the nightcap, as 18-year-old rookie Rick Wise pitches into the seventh inning to win his first game, giving up just three hits and three walks (Johnny Klippstein hurls the final three frames). The Phillies increase their National League lead to two games over the San Francisco Giants.
- June 24:
  - The Minnesota Twins sign second baseman Rod Carew as an amateur free agent. Panamanian immigrant Carew, 19, is signed to a contract while playing sandlot baseball in New York City by an off-duty police officer who "moonlights" as a Twins scout.
  - Sought-after University of Wisconsin outfielder Rick Reichardt signs a then-record, $205,000 bonus contract to join the Los Angeles Angels as an amateur free agent. The highly publicized bonus will be the "last straw" that convinces MLB owners to end their bidding wars for amateur domestic talent and institute the Major League Baseball draft, which will take effect in June 1965.
- June 26
  - Hard-hitting sophomore Cleveland Indians third baseman Max Alvis, 26, is hospitalized in Boston after an attack of spinal meningitis. He will recover completely but miss six weeks of action.
  - At D.C. Stadium, American League umpire Alaric Smith ejects Baltimore Orioles manager Hank Bauer in the 13th inning of the Orioles' 9–4 victory for "talking to someone in the stands"—who turns out to be Bauer's boss, general manager Lee MacPhail.
  - Twins owner Calvin Griffith strengthens his bullpen by acquiring Al Worthington, 35, from the Cincinnati Reds in a cash transaction. Three days from today, Griffith will add another veteran National League relief pitcher by purchasing the contract of Johnny Klippstein, 36, from the Philadelphia Phillies.

=== July ===
- July 6 – The three-day All-Star break begins with the Philadelphia Phillies (47–28) holding a 1½-game lead over the San Francisco Giants (47–31) in the National League; the sluggish St. Louis Cardinals (39–40) are in fifth place, ten full games out. In the American League, the Baltimore Orioles (48–28) have a three-game bulge over two runners-up, the Chicago White Sox (44–30) and New York Yankees (45–31).
- July 7 – At Shea Stadium, Johnny Callison's ninth-inning three-run home run off Dick Radatz caps a four-run rally and gives the National League a 7–4 win over the American League in the All-Star Game. Callison is named Game MVP as the NL triumph evens the series at 17.
- July 13 – The contending White Sox swap first basemen with the Washington Senators, obtaining right-handed-hitting, native Chicagoan Bill Skowron, 33, from Washington for lefty-swinging Joe Cunningham, 32, and a PTBNL (young pitcher Frank Kreutzer). Skowron, who made seven AL All-Star teams during his nine-year tenure (1954–1962) with the New York Yankees, has slugged 13 homers in 73 games as a Senator this season.
- July 15 – At Metropolitan Stadium, Minnesota Twins pitcher Mudcat Grant serves up 13 singles and a walk during eight innings—but none of the Washington Senators batters comes around to score and the Senators leave 12 men on base. The 13 safeties allowed by Grant in his 6–0 shutout win rank one behind the MLB record.
- July 19 – Luis Tiant pitches a complete-game, four-hit shutout in his Major League debut, leading the Cleveland Indians to a 3–0 victory over Whitey Ford and the New York Yankees at Yankee Stadium. Tiant—who posted a 15–1 (2.04) record in 17 games at Triple-A Portland—allows just four singles while striking out 11.
- July 22 – Pittsburgh Pirates future Hall of Famer Willie Stargell hits for the cycle, scores four times, and drives in three runs to lead the Bucs to a 13–2 rout of the St. Louis Cardinals at Busch Stadium.
- July 23 – Rookie Bert Campaneris, 22, of the Kansas City Athletics becomes the second player in history to hit two home runs in his MLB debut, joining Bob Nieman, who did it in 1951. Campaneris victimizes future Hall of Famer Jim Kaat of the Minnesota Twins for each long ball; he also singles and steals a base; the Athletics win 4–3 at Metropolitan Stadium.
- July 28 – The major leagues celebrate the second "cycle" in seven days when Jim Fregosi of the Los Angeles Angels performs the feat at "Chavez Ravine". His four hits and two RBI give Dean Chance, who'll be this year's Cy Young Award winner, the margin of victory in a 3–1 triumph over the New York Yankees.

=== August ===
- August 4 – Alvin Dark, manager of the San Francisco Giants, is summoned by Commissioner of Baseball Ford Frick to his New York office to discuss remarks attributed to him in July by reporter Stan Isaacs of Newsday in which Dark criticized the "mental alertness" of African-American and Latin-American players. The Giants are one of the most multiracial and multicultural teams in MLB, including key players and team leaders like Jesús Alou, Orlando Cepeda, Jim Ray Hart, Juan Marichal, Willie Mays, Willie McCovey and José Pagán. Dark claims the Newsday story was a "misunderstanding" and his remarks had been "deformed."
- August 7 – The Philadelphia Phillies, leading the National League by 2½ games, fill a gap in their lineup by acquiring veteran power-hitter Frank Thomas from the New York Mets for pitcher Gary Kroll, third baseman Wayne Graham and cash. Thomas, 35, will take over as the Phils' regular first baseman and hit .302 with seven homers over the next month until he's sidelined by a fractured thumb.
- August 12:
  - Making his MLB debut, 22-year-old right-hander Mel Stottlemyre, just recalled from Triple-A Richmond, throws a complete-game 7–3 victory for his New York Yankees over the Chicago White Sox at Yankee Stadium. Mickey Mantle hits a home run from both sides of the plate for the tenth time in his career. Third-place New York (66–45) keeps pace with the league-leading Baltimore Orioles (71–43) and gains a game on the second-place ChiSox (69–45). Stottlemyre will win nine of 12 decisions as a starting pitcher, with five complete games and two shutouts, during this season's furious, three-team American League pennant scramble.
  - At Crosley Field, the Cincinnati Reds host an emotional, 45th-birthday tribute to their cancer-stricken manager, Fred Hutchinson, before their game with the Los Angeles Dodgers. Hutchinson has managed the Reds for 109 of their 115 games while undergoing treatment. But he will enter the hospital the next day to fight the disease for the rest of the baseball season, while coach Dick Sisler pilots the Reds. Hutchinson will resign as manager October 19; he passes away in Bradenton, Florida, on November 12.
- August 17 – With the fifth-place St. Louis Cardinals at 62–55 (.530) and nine games behind the Phillies, owner August A. Busch Jr. replaces general manager Bing Devine with Bob Howsam, former owner of the minor-league Denver Bears. The roster that Howsam inherits goes 31–14 (.689) to edge Philadelphia and Cincinnati for the National League pennant, and defeats the Yankees in the 1964 World Series. Devine, meanwhile, earns his second consecutive Major League Executive of the Year award from The Sporting News. He will join the New York Mets as assistant to club president George Weiss on September 29.

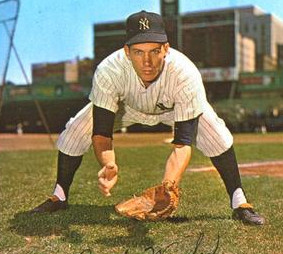
Phil Linz

- August 20 – At Comiskey Park, the Chicago White Sox complete a four-game sweep of the New York Yankees with a 5–0 shutout. As the Yankees' team bus heads to O'Hare International Airport after the game, infielder Phil Linz takes out a harmonica and plays a plaintive version of "Mary Had a Little Lamb". Manager Yogi Berra tells Linz to put the harmonica away. After Linz asks what Berra had said, Mickey Mantle tells Linz to "play it louder", which he does, prompting an unusually angry Berra to storm to the back to the bus and slap the harmonica out of Linz' hands; the instrument strikes Joe Pepitone's knee. The "Harmonica Incident" convinces the Yankee front office that Berra has lost control of the team and cannot command respect from his players. As a result, the decision is made to fire Berra at the end of the season.
- August 27 – The New York Mets sign Jerry Koosman as an amateur free agent.
- August 31 – Groundbreaking is held for the new Anaheim Stadium; it will open in 1966 as the home of the California Angels.

=== September ===
- September 1 – At Shea Stadium, pitcher Masanori Murakami of the San Francisco Giants becomes the first Japanese player to appear in the Major Leagues. He enters the game in the ninth inning of the Giants' 4–1 loss to the New York Mets and strikes out Charley Smith, the first batter he faces; Ed Kranepool also strikes out two batters later.
- September 5 – Locked in a three-team struggle for the American League pennant, the New York Yankees bolster their bullpen by acquiring hard-throwing right-hander Pedro Ramos from the Cleveland Indians for $75,000 and two players to be named later, pitchers Ralph Terry and Bud Daley. Ramos, 29, earns eight saves in 13 games over the next four weeks and goes 1–0 (1.25).
- September 7 – The Labor Day weekend ends with 1½ games separating the top three AL teams: the Baltimore Orioles (83–56), Chicago White Sox (84–58) and New York Yankees (80–56). In the National League, the Philadelphia Phillies (83–54) hold a 6½-game lead over three clubs virtually tied for second: the Cincinnati Reds and St. Louis Cardinals (both 77–61) and the Giants (78–62).
- September 9:
  - The Phillies acquire veteran first baseman Vic Power from the Los Angeles Angels as an emergency replacement for Frank Thomas, sidelined by a fractured thumb. Power, 36, is a seven-time AL Gold Glove Award winner but his offensive skills are in decline.
  - In tonight's game at Connie Mack Stadium, the Cardinals and Phillies go into extra innings tied at five. An error by third baseman Dick Allen leads to three unearned runs and the Cards score five in the 11th for a 10–5 victory.
- September 12 – Frank Bertaina of the Baltimore Orioles beats Bob Meyer of the Kansas City Athletics, 1–0, in a game in which both pitchers throw a one-hitter.
- September 17 – Seattle Mayor James d'Orma Braman publicly declares his intention to lure the Cleveland Indians to the city. The following month, the Indians' board of directors will announce the club will remain in Cleveland.
- September 19 – The Houston Colt .45s (61–88) change managers, with coach Lum Harris taking the reins from the team's first pilot, Harry Craft.
- September 20 – Jim Bunning strikes out John Roseboro in the ninth inning to preserve the visiting Philadelphia Phillies' 3–2 win over the Los Angeles Dodgers. The win comes after two straight losses (both charged to Jack Baldschun) and leaves the first-place Phils in front of the National League by 6½ games with 12 to play. When they return to Philadelphia in the early morning, 2,000 fans, including mayor James Tate, greet the team.
- September 21 – John Tsitouris hurls a 1–0 shutout for the Cincinnati Reds over Art Mahaffey and the first-place Phillies; Cincinnati rookie Chico Ruiz scores the only run when, with Frank Robinson at bat, he steals home with two outs in the sixth inning. The defeat launches the Phillies on a ten-game losing streak.
- September 27 – Johnny Callison hits three home runs, but the Phillies lose to the Milwaukee Braves 14–8. The Phils suffer the seventh loss in their ten-game losing streak, while the Reds sweep the New York Mets (4–1 and 3–1). The results knock Philadelphia out of first place, with the Reds replacing them—and the Phillies will never return to the top of the NL standings this season.

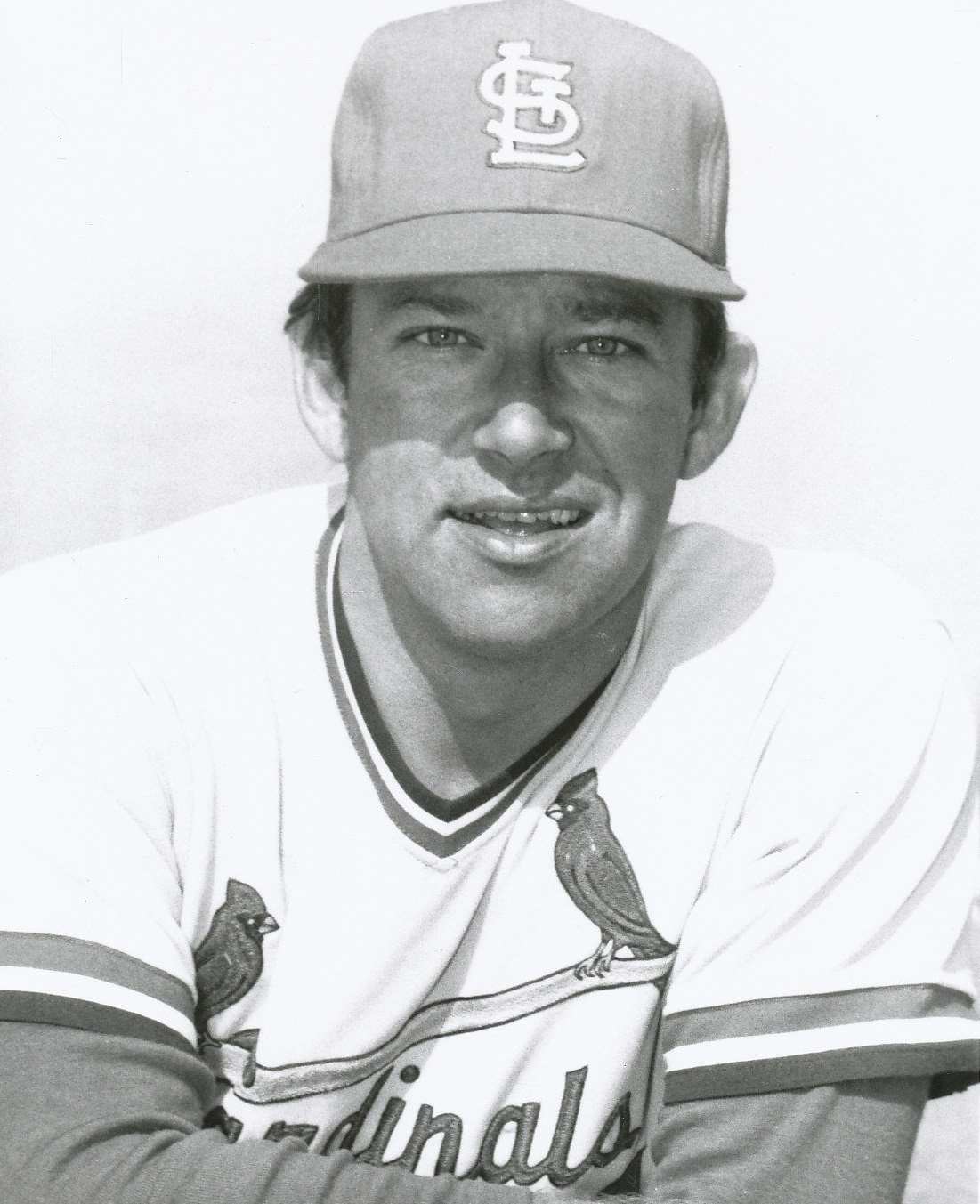
Ray Sadecki in 1975

- September 29 – The Pittsburgh Pirates blank Cincinnati 2–0 at Crosley Field (despite the Reds getting 11 hits off Bob Friend) to end the Reds' nine-game winning streak. Meanwhile, Ray Sadecki records his 20th victory as his St. Louis Cardinals defeat the Phillies 4–2 at Busch Stadium, the seventh win in the Cardinals' eight-game winning streak and the ninth loss in the Phillies' ten-game losing streak. The win vaults the Cardinals into a tie for first place with the Reds; St. Louis had been 11 games out of first on August 23.
- September 30 – Danny Murtaugh, 46, announces his pending retirement as manager of the Pittsburgh Pirates due to ill health after 7½ seasons, including their 1960 world championship campaign. But he will remain with team in a front-office post and return to the Pirates' helm three more times through 1976, and lead them to a second world title in 1971.

=== October ===
- October 1 – Johnny Pesky is fired as manager of the Boston Red Sox with two games remaining in his second season. Future Hall of Fame second baseman Billy Herman, 55, the Bosox' third-base coach, replaces Pesky.
- October 3:
  - The New York Yankees clinch their 15th American League pennant in 18 years, scoring five eighth-inning runs to break open a tie game and defeat the Cleveland Indians 8–3 in the Bronx. When the season ends tomorrow, New York's margin will be a single game over the Chicago White Sox and two lengths over the Baltimore Orioles.
  - As a result of the now-concluded Philadelphia Phillies' ten-game losing streak, the day begins with four teams still having a mathematical shot at the National League pennant, and a four-way tie is also still a possibility. But then one of the four, the San Francisco Giants, is eliminated with a 10–7 loss to the Chicago Cubs. At the end of the day, the Cincinnati Reds and St. Louis Cardinals are tied for first place, with the Phillies a game back. The scramble forces the NL to devise multiple emergency playoff scenarios.
- October 4:
  - The Phillies defeat the Reds 10–0 in the last regular-season game for both teams unless there is a playoff; with the Reds' loss, the Cardinals clinch a tie for the pennant. At the end of their game, the Phillies and Reds are a half-game back of the Cardinals, and await the result of the Redbirds' contest with the New York Mets at Busch Stadium.
  - Then the Cardinals—never in first place until the last week of the season—clinch their first pennant since 1946, tenth overall, with an 11–5 win over the last-place Mets, who had beaten the Redbirds twice in the two preceding days. St. Louis's triumph averts a three-way tie for the NL crown, with Philadelphia and Cincinnati finishing one game back in a second-place tie.
  - As soon as their season is completed, the San Francisco Giants fire manager Alvin Dark and replace him with Herman Franks, a coach whose links to the team extend to the Leo Durocher era in New York.
- October 11 – A team of U.S. college baseball players defeats a Japanese amateur all-star team, 6–2, in the lone game of baseball at the 1964 Summer Olympics, featured as a demonstration sport.
- October 14 – The Los Angeles Dodgers release infielder Jim Gilliam and outfielder Lee Walls; Gilliam will return to active status as a player-coach for the 1965 Dodgers. Also today, the Boston Red Sox release two veteran outfielders, Al Smith and Dick Williams; Williams will begin his Hall-of-Fame managerial career in 1965 at the helm of Boston's Triple-A Toronto affiliate.
- October 15 – The St. Louis Cardinals take an early lead in the deciding World Series Game 7 over the New York Yankees. Lou Brock hits a fifth-inning home run to give pitcher Bob Gibson a 6–0 lead. Mickey Mantle, Clete Boyer and Phil Linz homer for New York, but the Cardinals hold on to win 7–5 and their seventh Fall Classic. The Boyer brothers, the Yankees' Clete and the Cardinals' Ken, homer in their last career World Series plate appearance, a first in major league history.
- October 16 – The day after the Series' final game, the managerial posts of both pennant-winning teams are vacant. In the morning, Johnny Keane, manager of the victorious St. Louis Cardinals, resigns, much to the surprise of owner Gussie Busch; hours later, New York Yankees general manager Ralph Houk fires Yogi Berra, citing Berra's lack of control over his team and inability to command respect from his players.
  - Less than a week later, on October 20, Houk replaces Berra with Keane; the two had managed against each other in the Triple-A American Association during the mid-1950s.
  - The same day, Cardinals owner Busch, whose "secret" September discussions with Leo Durocher about becoming the Redbirds' 1965 manager may have prompted Keane's resignation, instead hires coach and popular former Cardinal star Red Schoendienst as the club's dugout boss for coming season.
  - Spurning the Yankees' offer of an off-field role, on November 17, Berra, 39, will sign a two-year contract as a playing coach with the New York Mets, reuniting him with Casey Stengel.
- October 19 – Harry "The Hat" Walker is named to succeed Danny Murtaugh as manager of the Pittsburgh Pirates. A gifted batting instructor and successful minor-league pilot, Walker's last MLB managerial assignment came with the Cardinals during the latter half of the 1955 season.
- October 30 - Joe Stanka is named MVP of the Pacific League of Nippon Professional baseball after leading the Nankai Hawks over the Yomiuri Giants in the 1964 Japan Series.

=== November ===
- November 2 – CBS Broadcasting Inc. becomes the first corporate owner of a Major League team after buying 80% of the New York Yankees assets for $11,200,000. Del Webb and Dan Topping each retain ten percent; CBS will acquire Webb's share in March 1965 and Topping's in September 1966 to assume sole ownership of the Yankees.
- November 9 – Dean Chance, 23-year-old Los Angeles Angels right-hander, is selected the ninth winner of the Cy Young Award, taking 17 of 20 first-place votes; Larry Jackson (two votes) and Sandy Koufax (one) are distant contenders. In 1964, Chance led the American League in games won (21), earned run average (1.65), complete games (15), shutouts (11), and innings pitched (2781/3); he even earned four saves. He will be the third and last AL hurler to win the all-MLB "CYA", which is dominated by National League moundsmen prior to its replacement by separate awards for each circuit in 1967.
- November 10 – The Milwaukee Braves sign a 25-year lease to play in the new Atlanta–Fulton County Stadium. The Braves' move has been rumored since 1963; this past season, they attracted 911,951 fans, sixth among the NL's ten teams.
- November 18 – Baltimore Orioles third baseman Brooks Robinson, who hit .317 with 28 home runs and 118 RBI, is named the American League's Most Valuable Player with 18 first-place votes and 269 points, becoming the first non-Yankee to win the award since Nellie Fox in 1959. The Yankees' Mickey Mantle (two votes, 171 points) and Elston Howard (124 points) are the runners-up. Robinson will be elected to the Baseball Hall of Fame in 1983.
- November 23 – After 20 seasons and 356 victories, most-ever by an MLB left-hander, Warren Spahn and the Braves sever their relationship when Milwaukee sells the future Hall of Famer's contract to the New York Mets. Spahn, 43, had posted his poorest season in 1964—going 6–13 (5.29) in 38 games. Determined to prolong his playing career, he had turned down the Braves' offer of three off-field jobs in their organization. The Mets name Spahn the club's playing pitching coach for 1965, and reunite him with Casey Stengel, his first big-league manager when Spahn broke in with the 1942 Boston Braves.

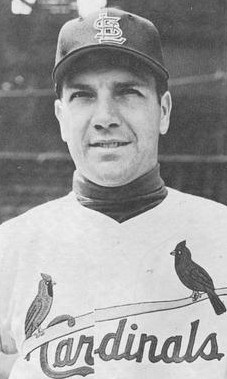
Ken Boyer

- November 24 – St. Louis Cardinals third baseman Ken Boyer, who hit .295 with 24 home runs and 119 RBI, is named the NL's Most Valuable Player with 14 first-place votes and 243 points, becoming the first Redbird MVP since Stan Musial won his third award in 1948. Johnny Callison (two votes, 187 points) and Boyer's teammate Bill White (two, 106) are the runners-up.
- November 28:
  - In a near-unanimous decision, Minnesota Twins outfielder and future Hall of Famer Tony Oliva is selected Rookie of the Year in the American League, capturing 19 of 20 votes; Wally Bunker heads one writer's ballot. Oliva, 26, led the AL in batting (.323), runs scored (109), and hits (217).
  - Another future Hall of Famer, the Philadelphia Phillies' Dick Allen, overwhelmingly wins the National League's "ROTY" balloting, taking 18 of 20 first-place votes; Rico Carty and Jim Ray Hart each receive one tally. Third baseman Allen, 22, led the NL in runs scored (125) and triples (13), and finished in the Top Ten in hits (201), batting (.318), and home runs (29).
- November 29 – In need of a regular first baseman, the Phillies acquire slugger Dick Stuart from the Boston Red Sox for southpaw pitcher Dennis Bennett. In his two seasons with Boston, Stuart has hit 75 home runs and amassed 232 RBI, but his lackadaisical defense has earned him the nickname "Doctor Strangeglove".
- November 30:
  - With Stuart's acquisition and Frank Thomas healthy again, the Phillies sell the contract of first baseman Vic Power back to the Los Angeles Angels. Philadelphia had obtained Power from the Angels in early September (for pitcher and PTBNL Marcelino López) in the aftermath of Thomas's injured thumb; Power batted only .208 with ten hits in 18 games during the NL stretch drive.
  - In the first-year professional player draft, among the 22 men selected are future Cy Young Award-winner Sparky Lyle (picked by the Boston Red Sox from the Baltimore Orioles) and three-time All-Star and 2x Gold Glove-winning second baseman Felix Millan (by the Milwaukee Braves from the Kansas City Athletics).

=== December ===
- December 1:
  - The Chicago White Sox trade former 20-game-winner Ray Herbert and first baseman/outfielder Jeoff Long to the Philadelphia Phillies for shortstop Lee Elia and outfielder Danny Cater.
  - The Washington Senators trade outfielder Chuck Hinton to the Cleveland Indians for first baseman Bob Chance and infielder Woodie Held.
  - The Houston Colt .45s officially change their nickname to Astros. The change coincides with the team's impending move from Colt Stadium to the Harris County Domed Stadium, also known as the Astrodome. A change in name for the three-year-old franchise is necessitated due to a dispute with the Colt firearm company; the Astros name is chosen due to Houston being the home of NASA's Manned Spacecraft Center.
- December 3 – The Phillies keep dealing, sending two youngsters, southpaw Rudy May and first baseman Costen Shockley, to the Los Angeles Angels for left-handed hurler Bo Belinsky.
- December 4:
  - Alarmed by the $205,000 signing bonus the Los Angeles Angels bestowed upon University of Wisconsin outfielder Rick Reichardt during the summer, MLB owners vote to implement an amateur free agent draft beginning in 1965. The inverse order of the previous year's standings will be used to select high school and college players. Drafts will occur in June and January, and each will have both primary and secondary phases, the latter for previously drafted, but unsigned, athletes. International free agents, from outside the U.S. and Canada, are not affected.
  - In the most significant trade of the winter meetings, the Los Angeles Dodgers trade pitchers Phil Ortega and Pete Richert, third baseman Ken McMullen, outfielder Frank Howard, and a player to be named later (first baseman Dick Nen) to the Washington Senators for southpaw pitcher Claude Osteen, third baseman John Kennedy and $100,000. Osteen, 25, will become the Dodgers' #3 starter, behind Sandy Koufax and Don Drysdale, and help his team win the 1965 World Series and 1966 National League pennant. Howard becomes a star in Washington, known as "The Capital Punisher," who slams 44 or more homers for three consecutive seasons (1968–1970), twice leading the American League in that statistic.
  - The Minnesota Twins acquire extremely versatile utility César Tovar from the Cincinnati Reds in exchange for pitcher Gerry Arrigo. Tovar will play eight seasons in Minnesota.
- December 7 – The World Series-champion St. Louis Cardinals and last-place New York Mets make a trade, with the Redbirds acquiring right-hander Tracy Stallard and infielder Elio Chacón for pitcher Gordie Richardson and outfielder Johnny Lewis.
- December 14 – The Reds trade former 20-game-winner Bob Purkey to the Cardinals for pitcher Roger Craig and outfielder Charlie James.
- December 17 – The New York Yankees fire longtime lead play-by-play announcer Mel Allen and replace him with former MLB catcher Joe Garagiola. Allen, first heard on Yankee games in 1939, is a national figure who has also described at least 17 World Series over the past 23 seasons. He will be the first-ever winner of a Ford C. Frick Award (along with Red Barber) in 1978.
- December 24 – The Kansas City Athletics sign amateur free agent pitcher Rollie Fingers, a June graduate of Southern California's Upland High School. Fingers, 18, is a future Hall of Famer, a three-time World Series champion, 7x All-Star, winner of a Cy Young Award and an MVP Award.

== Births ==
=== January ===
- January 2 – Colby Ward
- January 3
  - Howard Hilton
  - Luis Rivera
  - Russ Swan
- January 7
  - Allan Anderson
  - Dave Meads
- January 9 – Stan Javier
- January 13
  - José Núñez
  - Billy Jo Robidoux
- January 15 – Jeff Banister
- January 17 – Jeff Tabaka
- January 18 – Brady Anderson
- January 19
  - Mark Grater
  - Jim Morris
- January 20 – Ozzie Guillén
- January 22 – Wayne Kirby
- January 24 – Rob Dibble
- January 25 – Francisco Meléndez
- January 28 – Fredi González
- January 29 – John Habyan
- January 30 – Hipólito Peña

=== February ===
- February 4 – Jeff Gardner
- February 7 – Bien Figueroa
- February 8 – Edgar Díaz
- February 9 – Ed Whited
- February 12
  - Joe Bitker
  - Cameron Drew
- February 13 – Dann Howitt
- February 14
  - Keith Brown
  - Bill McGuire
- February 16 – Rico Rossy
- February 17 – Mike Campbell
- February 18 – Kevin Tapani
- February 24 – René Arocha
- February 25 – Rich Rowland

=== March ===
- March 2 – Tim Layana
- March 3 – Marvin Hudson
- March 4 – Tom Lampkin
- March 7 – Wayne Edwards
- March 8 – Lance McCullers
- March 13 – Will Clark
- March 19 – Jeff Hamilton
- March 26 – Mike Loynd
- March 28 – Mike Fitzgerald
- March 31
  - Chris Cron
  - Balvino Gálvez
  - Rafael Montalvo

=== April ===
- April 2 – Pete Incaviglia
- April 6 – Kenny Williams
- April 9 – Blaise Ilsley
- April 10 – Eric King
- April 11
  - Amalio Carreño
  - Bret Saberhagen
  - Wally Whitehurst
- April 12
  - Jerry Goff
  - Mike Macfarlane
- April 13 – Doug Strange
- April 19 – Scott Kamieniecki
- April 20 – Jimmy Jones
- April 22 – Jack Savage
- April 25 – Blaine Beatty
- April 28
  - Barry Larkin
  - Eric Nolte
- April 30 – Jeff Reboulet

=== May ===
- May 1
  - Dan Gakeler
  - José Lind
- May 8 – Dave Rohde
- May 11
  - Billy Bean
  - Trenidad Hubbard
  - Jeff Sellers
  - Bobby Witt
  - Floyd Youmans
- May 17 – Rob Nelson
- May 19 – Luis Aquino
- May 20
  - Gordon Dillard
  - Jeff Schwarz
- May 23 – Gino Minutelli
- May 26 – Willie Fraser
- May 28 – Duane Ward

=== June ===
- June 3 – Nelson Liriano
- June 4 – Steve Searcy
- June 6 – Edgar Cáceres
- June 11 – Ron Jones
- June 18 – Tommy Hinzo
- June 21 – Brad Moore
- June 22 – Jim Hunter
- June 28
  - Mark Grace
  - Kevin Reimer
- June 30 – Doug Dascenzo

=== July ===
- July 2
  - Jose Canseco
  - Ozzie Canseco
  - Joe Magrane
- July 3 – Warren Newson
- July 8
  - Bob Kipper
  - Ken Patterson
- July 12 – Mike Schwabe
- July 13 – Greg Litton
- July 14 – Darren Hall
- July 15 – Steve Cummings
- July 20
  - Mark Lee
  - Jim Lewis
- July 24 – Barry Bonds
- July 25 – José Bautista
- July 28
  - Bob Milacki
  - Terry Taylor

=== August ===
- August 2 – Cliff Young
- August 3 – Kevin Elster
- August 4
  - Rubén Rodríguez
  - B. J. Surhoff
- August 10
  - Andy Stankiewicz
  - Bill Wilkinson
- August 13
  - Jay Buhner
  - Gary Cooper
  - Tom Prince
- August 14
  - Mark Leonard
  - Tommy Shields
- August 15 – Jeff Huson
- August 16 – Rick Reed
- August 21 – Shawn Hillegas
- August 22 – Mike Everitt
- August 23 – Jeff Manto
- August 24 – Kip Gross
- August 26 – Chad Kreuter

=== September ===
- September 1
  - Luis Lopez
  - David West
- September 5 – Ron Rightnowar
- September 6 – Mike York
- September 7 – Sergio Valdez
- September 10 – Joe Kraemer
- September 11 – Ellis Burks
- September 13 – Greg Hibbard
- September 17 – Jim Pena
- September 18 – Dan Murphy
- September 24
  - Jim Neidlinger
  - Rafael Palmeiro
- September 26
  - Dave Martinez
  - Joe Skalski
- September 30
  - Doug Jennings
  - Scott Lusader

=== October ===
- October 1 – Roberto Kelly
- October 2
  - Randy Byers
  - Héctor Villanueva
- October 4
  - John Kiely
  - Mark McLemore
- October 5 – Terry Mathews
- October 7
  - Jim Bruske
  - Rich DeLucia
- October 13 – Chris Gwynn
- October 14 – Joe Girardi
- October 15 – John Barfield
- October 19 – Mike Pérez
- October 22 – Gerald Young
- October 25 – Takehiro Ishii
- October 26 – Steve Adkins
- October 28 – Lenny Harris
- October 31 – Steve Rosenberg

=== November ===
- November 1 – Eddie Williams
- November 9 – Kevin Mmahat
- November 10
  - Shawn Holman
  - Keith Lockhart
  - Junior Noboa
  - Kenny Rogers
- November 11 – Roberto Hernández
- November 12
  - Dave Otto
  - Gary Thurman
- November 15 – Daryl Irvine
- November 16
  - Dwight Gooden
  - Rob Mallicoat
- November 17 – Mitch Williams
- November 23 – José González
- November 24 – Bob Malloy
- November 25 – Mark Davis
- November 28
  - John Burkett
  - Craig Wilson

=== December ===
- December 2 – Chip Hale
- December 3
  - Jeff Carter
  - Steve Carter
  - Darryl Hamilton
- December 5 – Gene Harris
- December 6 – Kevin Campbell
- December 11 – Thomas Howard
- December 12 – Alonzo Powell
- December 13 – Steve Wilson
- December 14 – Mitch Lyden
- December 16 – Billy Ripken
- December 19 – Mike Fetters
- December 22 – Mike Jackson
- December 24
  - Carlos Diaz
  - Tim Drummond
- December 26 – Jeff King
- December 29
  - Craig Grebeck
  - Curt Hasler
  - Rod Nichols

== Deaths ==
=== January ===
- January [?] – Al Cabrera, 82, native of Spain (Canary Islands) who appeared in one game as shortstop for the St. Louis Cardinals on May 16, 1913.
- January 13 – Margaret Stefani, 46, All-Star infielder in the 1943 inaugural season of the All-American Girls Professional Baseball League.
- January 15
  - Ed Henderson, 79, who pitched in 1914 with the Pittsburgh Rebels and the Indianapolis Hoosiers of the Federal League.
  - Bob Larmore, 67, backup shortstop for the 1918 St. Louis Cardinals.
- January 16 – Howard Baker, 75, third baseman who played for the Cleveland Naps, Chicago White Sox and New York Giants in parts of three seasons spanning 1912–1915.
- January 17 – John Grimes, 94, who pitched in three games for the 1897 St. Louis Browns.
- January 31 – John Huber, 55, primarily a catcher and pitcher for Philadelphia of the Negro National League and Chicago, Birmingham, Memphis and Indianapolis of the Negro American League between 1941 and 1947.

=== February ===
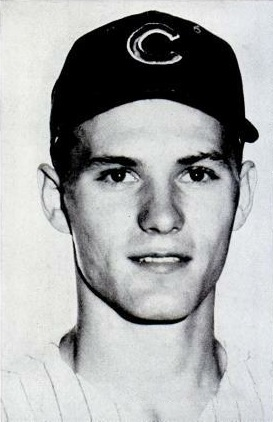
Ken Hubbs

- February 4 – Fred Smith, 85, pitcher for the 1907 Cincinnati Reds.
- February 12
  - Ted Pawelek, 44, catcher for the Chicago Cubs who played four MLB games during the 1946 season.
  - Al Pierotti, 68, pitcher for the Boston Braves from 1920 to 1921, who was also an offensive lineman in the American Professional Football League from 1920 through 1929.
- February 13 – Ken Hubbs, 22, Gold Glove-winning second baseman for the Chicago Cubs and the 1962 National League Rookie of the Year.
- February 14 – Bill Stewart, 69, National League umpire from 1933 to 1954 who worked four World Series, four All-Star Games and the 1951 NL pennant playoff; also a hockey coach and referee who led the Chicago Black Hawks to the 1938 Stanley Cup title.
- February 15 – Fred Trautman, 71, pitcher for the 1915 Newark Peppers of the Federal League.
- February 22
  - Kid Butler, 76, infielder for the 1907 St. Louis Browns.
  - Ike Samuels, 90, third baseman for the 1895 St. Louis Browns of the National League.
- February 24 – Henry Baldwin, 69, backup infielder for the 1927 Philadelphia Phillies.
- February 27 – Tony Smith, 79, shortstop for the AL Washington Senators (1907) and the NL Brooklyn Superbas/Dodgers (1910–1911).
- February 28 – Guy Ousley, 53, shortstop for Chicago of the Negro National League and Memphis and Louisville of the Negro Southern League in 1932–1933.

=== March ===
- March 2 – Fred Vaughn, 45, second baseman for the AL Washington Senators over parts of two seasons from 1944 to 1945.
- March 3 – Lefty Scott, 48, pitcher for the Philadelphia Phillies in the 1945 season.
- March 10 – Warren Shanabrook, 83, third baseman for the 1906 Washington Senators.
- March 13 – Mack Allison, 77, pitcher who played from 1911 through 1913 for the St. Louis Browns of the American League.
- March 19 – John Henry Lloyd, 79, Hall of Fame shortstop of the Negro leagues who was dubbed as the black Honus Wagner.

=== April ===
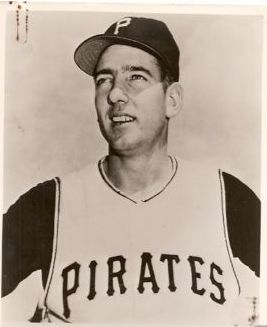
Jim Umbricht

- April 1 – Casey Hageman, 76, who pitched from 1911 through 1914 for the Boston Red Sox, St. Louis Cardinals and Chicago Cubs.
- April 5 – Bob Clemens, 77, outfielder who played with the St. Louis Browns in 1914.
- April 7 – Johnny Tillman, 70, pitcher who played for the St. Louis Browns in 1915.
- April 8
  - George Moriarty, 79, third baseman who played 1,075 gams for four MLB clubs, notably the 1909–1915 Detroit Tigers, and American League umpire (1917–1926 and 1929–1940), interrupting his officiating tenure to serve a two-year term as manager of 1927–1928 Tigers.
  - Mickey O'Neil, 63, catcher for the Boston Braves, Brooklyn Robins, Washington Senators and New York Giants, in a span of nine seasons from 1919 to 1927.
  - Jim Umbricht, 33, relief pitcher for the Houston Colt .45s, who battled back from cancer surgery to post a 4–3 record for the club in 1963.
- April 10 – Chief Yellow Horse, 66, pitcher for the Pittsburgh Pirates from 1921 to 1922; a Native American from the Pawnee tribe who was the first full-blooded American Indian to have played in Major League Baseball history.
- April 13 – Ed Pipgras, 59, pitcher in five games for the 1932 Brooklyn Dodgers; his brother was a mound star for the "Murderers' Row" Yankees of the late 1920s.
- April 14 – Enos Kirkpatrick, 79, third baseman who played from 1912 through 1915 for the Brooklyn Dodgers/Superbas and the Baltimore Terrapins.
- April 16
  - Charlie Case, 84, pitcher who played with the Cincinnati Reds in 1901 and for the Pittsburgh Pirates in 1906.
  - Gus Williams, 75, outfielder for the St. Louis Browns during five seasons from 1911 to 1915.
- April 17 – Kid Willson, 78, outfielder who played for the Chicago White Sox in part of two seasons spanning 1918–1927.
- April 20 – Eddie Dyer, 64, pitcher (1922–1927) and manager (1946–1950) for the St. Louis Cardinals who guided the team to the 1946 World Series title.
- April 22 – Herb Herring, 72, who made one pitching appearance for the Washington Senators in the 1912 season.

=== May ===
- May 2 – Sensation Clark, 61, who pitched for Pittsburgh, Memphis, Indianapolis and Cleveland of the Negro National League from 1922 to 1924.
- May 3 – Gerry Shea, 82, catcher for the 1905 St. Louis Cardinals.
- May 7 – Clyde Goodwin, 82, pitcher for the 1906 Washington Senators.
- May 9 – Chauncey Burkam, 71, pinch hitter for the St. Louis Browns in the 1915 season.
- May 10
  - Charlie Butler, pitcher for the 1933 Philadelphia Phillies.
  - George McConnell, 86, spitball specialist who pitched for five teams in a span of six seasons from 1909 to 1916.
- May 14 – Dave Altizer, 87, shortstop who played from 1906 through 1911 for four teams, most relevantly with the Washington Senators; one of the few major leaguers to have served in the United States Army during the Boxer Rebellion of 1899–1901.
- May 15 – Harley Boss, 55, first baseman who played for the Washington Senators and the Cleveland Indians in part of four seasons spanning 1928–1933.
- May 16 – Buzz Arlett, 65, called the Babe Ruth of the Minor Leagues; slugging outfielder/pitcher who hit .341 with 432 home runs and 1,976 RBI in a 19-year career, while posting a 108–93 pitching record with a 3.39 ERA; played in 121 games in the majors with the Philadelphia Phillies in 1931, batting .313 with 131 hits.
- May 20
  - Frank Moore, 86, pitcher for the 1905 Pittsburgh Pirates.
  - Cy Neighbors, 83, outfielder for the 1908 Pittsburgh Pirates.
- May 23 – Ernie Wolf, 75, pitcher who played for the Cleveland Naps in 1912.
- May 25 – Joe Martin, 88, backup outfielder who played for the Washington Senators and St. Louis Browns in the 1903 season.
- May 27 – Lou Jorda, 71, National League umpire who officiated in 2,508 contests over 18 seasons (1927–1931, 1940–1952), as well as in two World Series and two All-Star games.
- May 28 – Buzzy Wares, 78, shortstop for the St. Louis Browns from 1913 to 1914, later a longtime coach for the St. Louis Cardinals from 1930 to 1952, during which time the Cardinals won seven National League pennants and five World Series titles.
- May 29 – Eli Cates, 87, pitcher for the 1908 Washington Senators.
- May 31 – Rabbit Warstler, 60, middle infielder who played from 1930 through 1940 for the Boston Red Sox, Philadelphia Athletics, Boston Bees and Chicago Cubs.

=== June ===
- June 2 – Jack Kading, 79, first baseman who played with the Pittsburgh Pirates in 1910 and for the Chicago Chi-Feds in 1914.
- June 7 – Elmer Stricklett, 87, pitcher who played from 1904 through 1907 for the Chicago White Sox and Brooklyn Superbas.
- June 11 – Jack Blott, 61, catcher for the 1924 Cincinnati Reds, as well as a football coach in the Michigan and Wesleyan universities from 1924 through 1940.
- June 12
  - Bud Connolly, 63, shortstop for the 1925 Boston Red Sox.
  - Walter Zink, 66, pitcher for the 1921 New York Giants.
- June 15 – Jim Spotts, 55, catcher who appeared in three games at age 21 for the 1930 Philadelphia Phillies.
- June 16 – Dick Culler, 49, middle infielder and third baseman who played for the Philadelphia Athletics, Chicago White Sox, Boston Braves, Chicago Cubs and New York Giants in all or part of eight seasons spanning 1936–1949.
- June 27
  - John Shackelford, 58, third baseman for Cleveland (1924), Chicago (1926) and Birmingham (1930) of the Negro National League and Harrisburg (1925) of the Eastern Colored League; University of Michigan School of Law graduate who maintained longtime legal practices in Grand Rapids and Cleveland, and served as president of the United States League, a short-lived Negro leagues circuit, in 1945–1946.
  - Tex Wisterzil, 76, third baseman who played from 1914 to 1915 for the Brooklyn Tip-Tops, Chicago Whales and St. Louis Terriers of the outlaw Federal League.

=== July ===
- July 1 – Jay Rogers, 75, backup catcher for the 1914 New York Yankees.
- July 5 – Dick Attreau, 67, first baseman who played from 1926 to 1927 with the Philadelphia Phillies.
- July 7 – Glenn Gardner, 48, pitcher who played for the St. Louis Cardinals in the 1945 season.
- July 19 – Len Swormstedt, 85, pitcher for the Cincinnati Reds and the Boston Americans from 1901 to 1906.
- July 20
  - Bill Narleski, 64, shortstop who played in 135 games from 1929 to 1930 for the Boston Red Sox; father of Ray Narleski.
  - Bill Schardt, 78, pitcher who played from 1911 to 1912 for the Brooklyn Dodgers.
- July 25 – Mo Harris, 66, stalwart second baseman/outfielder in Black baseball for the Homestead Grays between 1918 and 1929 and Pittsburgh Crawfords in 1931.
- July 26 – Harry Smith, 74, pitcher for the 1912 Chicago White Sox.
- July 27
  - Dominic Mulrenan, 70, pitcher for the 1921 Chicago White Sox.
  - Lizzie Murphy, 70, billed as the Queen of Baseball, who played at first base in an exhibition game against the Boston Red Sox at Fenway Park on August 14, 1922, to become the first woman to play against a Major League Baseball team.
- July 29 – Vean Gregg, 79, pitcher for the 1915 and 1916 World Series Champions Boston Red Sox, who posted a career record of 92–63 with a 2.70 ERA, and also led the American League in ERA in 1911.
- July 30 – Jabbo Andrews, 56, hard-hitting outfielder who appeared for at least 11 different teams in five Negro leagues between 1930 and 1942; won 1933 batting title of the Negro National League with a .398 average.
- July – Marvin Barker, 52, All-Star outfielder who played 12 seasons for the New York Black Yankees between 1935 and 1948.

=== August ===
- August 4 – Jerry Standaert, 62, backup infielder who played for the Brooklyn Robins and Boston Red Sox in a span of three seasons from 1925 to 1929.
- August 5 – Ed Coleman, 62, right fielder who played from 1932 through 1936 for the Philadelphia Athletics and St. Louis Browns.
- August 6 – Curly Ogden, 63, pitcher who played from 1922 through 1926 for the Philadelphia Athletics and Washington Senators; member of 1924 world champion Senators.
- August 8 – Ches Buchanan, 56, pitcher for the Philadelphia Stars of the Negro National League (1935, 1940–1944).
- August 9 – Pete Johns, 76, backup infielder who played for the Chicago White Sox and St. Louis Browns between 1915 and 1918.
- August 17 – Happy Felsch, 72, center fielder and one of eight players banned from baseball for life for his role in the 1919 Black Sox Scandal.
- August 21 – J. L. Wilkinson, 86, owner of the Negro league Kansas City Monarchs from 1920 to 1948.
- August 30 – Bob Jones, 74, third baseman for the Detroit Tigers during nine seasons from 1917 to 1925.

=== September ===
- September 3 – Hank Ritter, 70, pitcher for the Philadelphia Phillies and New York Giants in a span of four seasons from 1912 to 1916.
- September 5 – Fred Stem, 78, first baseman who played for the Boston Doves of the National League from 1908 to 1909.
- September 8 – Buck Redfern, 62, backup infielder for the Chicago White Sox in the 1928 and 1929 seasons.
- September 9
  - Herschel Bennett, 67, outfielder who played for the St. Louis Browns from 1923 through 1927.
  - George Stueland, 65, pitcher for the Chicago Cubs in part of four season from 1921 to 1925.
- September 11
  - Red McDermott, 75, outfielder for the 1912 Detroit Tigers.
  - Tom Meany, 60, sportswriter for six New York newspapers, as well as Collier's magazine from 1923 to 1956; also publicity and promotions director for the New York Mets since their 1961 formation.
- September 16 – Herb Conyers, 43, first baseman who played in seven games for the Cleveland Indians in 1950; batting average champion of four different minor leagues between 1942 and 1948.
- September 18 – Frank Barron, 74, pitcher for the 1914 Washington Senators.
- September 22 – Red Torkelson, 70, pitcher for the Cleveland Indians in 1917.
- September 23 – Cy Barger, 79, dead ball era pitcher who played with four teams in three different leagues in a span of seven seasons from 1906 to 1915.
- September 26 – Paul Zahniser, 68, pitcher for the Washington Senators, Boston Red Sox, and Cincinnati Reds from 1923 to 1929.
- September 27 – Jud McLaughlin, 52, pitcher for the Boston Red Sox between 1931 and 1933.

=== October ===
- October 6
  - Dan Adams, 77, pitcher who played from 1914 to 1915 for the Kansas City Packers of the Federal League.
  - Barney Schreiber, 82, pitcher for the 1911 Cincinnati Reds.
- October 7 – Charlie Armbruster, 84, backup catcher who played from 1905 through 1907 for the Boston Americans and the Chicago White Sox.
- October 9 – Al Wingo, 66, outfielder for the Philadelphia Athletics and Detroit Tigers in a span of six seasons from 1919 to 1928, before joining the San Francisco Seals of the Pacific Coast League from 1929 to 1931.
- October 11 – Stan Gray, 75, first baseman who played for the Pittsburgh Pirates in 1912.
- October 13 – Scrappy Moore, 71, third baseman for the 1917 St. Louis Browns.
- October 14 – Tom "Big Train" Parker, 52, burly outfielder/pitcher for multiple teams in the Negro and independent leagues, notably the Homestead Grays, between 1931 and 1948; briefly managed 1943 Harrisburg Stars of the Negro National League.
- October 15 – Alex Evans, 68, who pitched for Atlantic City in the Eastern Colored League and Indianapolis and Memphis of the Negro National League in 1924.
- October 17 – Carson Bigbee, 69, outfielder who spent his entire Major League career with the Pittsburgh Pirates from 1916 through 1926, including the Pirates team that won the 1925 World Series title.
- October 19 – Grover Hartley, 76, long time backup catcher and coach who played for seven different clubs of the American and National leagues during eleven seasons spanning 1911–1934.
- October 20 – John Whitehead, 55, pitcher who played for the Chicago White Sox and St. Louis Browns in a span of seven seasons between 1935 and 1942.
- October 29 – William Sumrall, 47, pitcher for the 1938 New York Black Yankees and 1943 Memphis Red Sox.
- October 31 – Phyllis Bookout, 29, All-American Girls Professional Baseball League player.

=== November ===
- November 5 – Dutch Stryker, 69, pitcher who played with the Boston Braves in 1924 and for the Brooklyn Robins in 1926.
- November 6 – Buz Phillips, 60, pitcher in 14 games for the 1930 Philadelphia Phillies.
- November 10 – Emil Sick, 70, Seattle brewer who owned the minor-league Seattle Rainiers (1937–1960) and Vancouver Capilanos (1946–1954), and built Seattle's Sick's Stadium and Vancouver's Nat Bailey Stadium.
- November 11 – Oscar Stanage, 81, top-flight defensive catcher for the Cincinnati Reds in one game in 1906 and for the Detroit Tigers from 1909 to 1920 and in 1925; holds American League record for assists by a catcher in a season (212 in 1911).
- November 12 – Fred Hutchinson, 45, for whom the Seattle cancer research and therapy center is named and inspiration for the Hutch Award; manager of the Cincinnati Reds from mid-July 1959 until taking a medical leave for cancer treatments in mid-August 1964; led Reds to 1961 National League pennant; previously an All-Star pitcher (1939–1940 and 1946–1953) and manager (1952–1954) of the Detroit Tigers, and pilot of the St. Louis Cardinals (1956–1958), where he was selected 1957 MLB Manager of the Year.
- November 13 – Bris Lord, 81, outfielder who played for the Cleveland Naps, Philadelphia Athletics and Boston Braves in part of eight seasons spanning 1905–1913.
- November 16 – Yam Yaryan, 72, backup catcher for the Chicago White Sox in the 1921 and 1922 seasons.
- November 19 – Fred Hofmann, 70, who spent 36 years in the major leagues as a catcher, coach and scout, and also won two minor league pennants as a manager.
- November 22 – Willis Flournoy, 69, southpaw who pitched for the Hilldale Club, Brooklyn Royal Giants and Baltimore Black Sox between 1923 and 1932; led Eastern Colored League in earned run average (2.32) in 1926.
- November 27 – Art Gleeson, 58, play-by-play sportscaster who described MLB games for the New York Yankees (1951–1952), the Mutual Network Game of the Day (1953–1959), and Boston Red Sox (1960–1964).

=== December ===
- December 1 – Barbara Rotvig, 35, All-American Girls Professional Baseball League pitcher for the Kenosha Comets.
- December 5 – Ed Wingo, 69, Canadian catcher who played for the Philadelphia Athletics in the 1920 season.
- December 6 – Bobby Keefe, 82, pitcher who played for the New York Highlanders and Cincinnati Reds in a span of three seasons from 1907 to 1912.
- December 7 – Bill Karlon, 55, outfielder who played in two games for the New York Yankees in 1930.
- December 13 – Hank Erickson, 57, catcher for the 1935 Cincinnati Reds.
- December 15 – Paul Wachtel, 76, pitcher for the 1917 Brooklyn Robins.
- December 21 – Delos Brown, 72, pinch hitter who appeared in one game for the Chicago White Sox in 1914.
- December 22
  - Lou Fiene, 79, pitcher who played from 1906 through 1909 for the Chicago White Sox.
  - William Ross, 71, pitcher/outfielder who appeared in Black baseball between 1917 and 1930, most prominently for the 1924–1926 St. Louis Stars of the Negro National League.
- December 27
  - Art Phelan, 77, third baseman who played for the Cincinnati Reds and Chicago Cubs in part of five seasons spanning 1910–1915.
  - Tom Young, 62, lefty-swinging All-Star catcher who played in Black baseball between 1926 and 1941, notably for the Kansas City Monarchs (1926–1935).
- December 31
  - Bobby Byrne, 80, speedy third baseman who played eleven seasons from 1907 to 1917, most prominently with the 1909 Pittsburgh Pirates World Series champion team.
  - Red Rollings, 60, utility infielder/outfielder who played for the 1927–1928 Boston Red Sox and 1930 Boston Braves.
  - Doc Wallace, 71, shortstop who played for Philadelphia Phillies in the 1919 season.
