= List of baseball parks in Seattle =

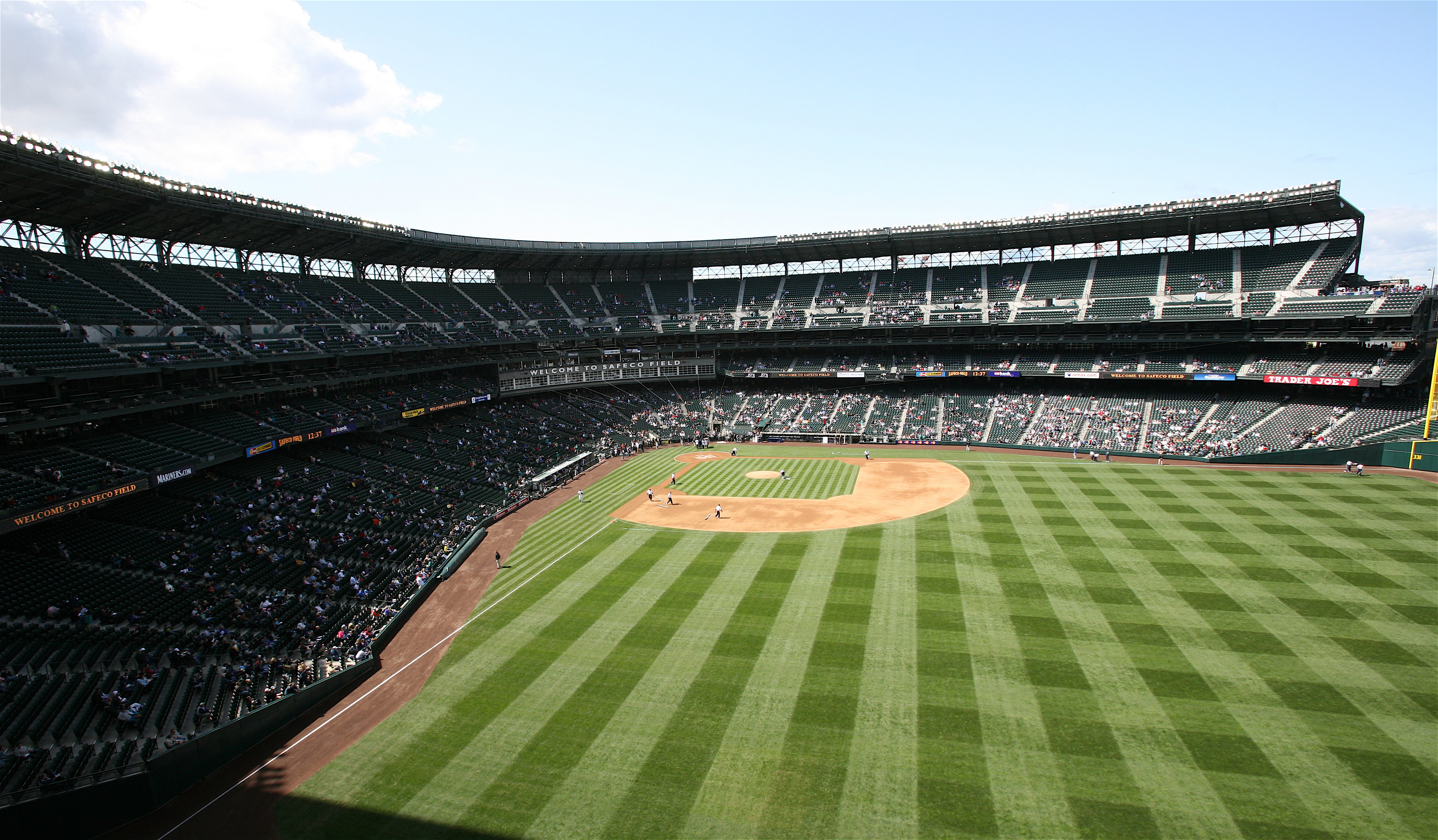
T-Mobile Park is the home of the Seattle Mariners.

The following is a list of current, and former professional baseball stadiums in Seattle, Washington. The list consists of only known stadiums. In all, there were nine known professional baseball parks in the city of Seattle. Of those nine, three stadiums have housed a Major League Baseball (MLB) franchise. The first stadiums was played on in 1892 by the Seattle Hustlers. The only current stadium is T-Mobile Park, the home of the Seattle Mariners of MLB.

== Stadiums ==
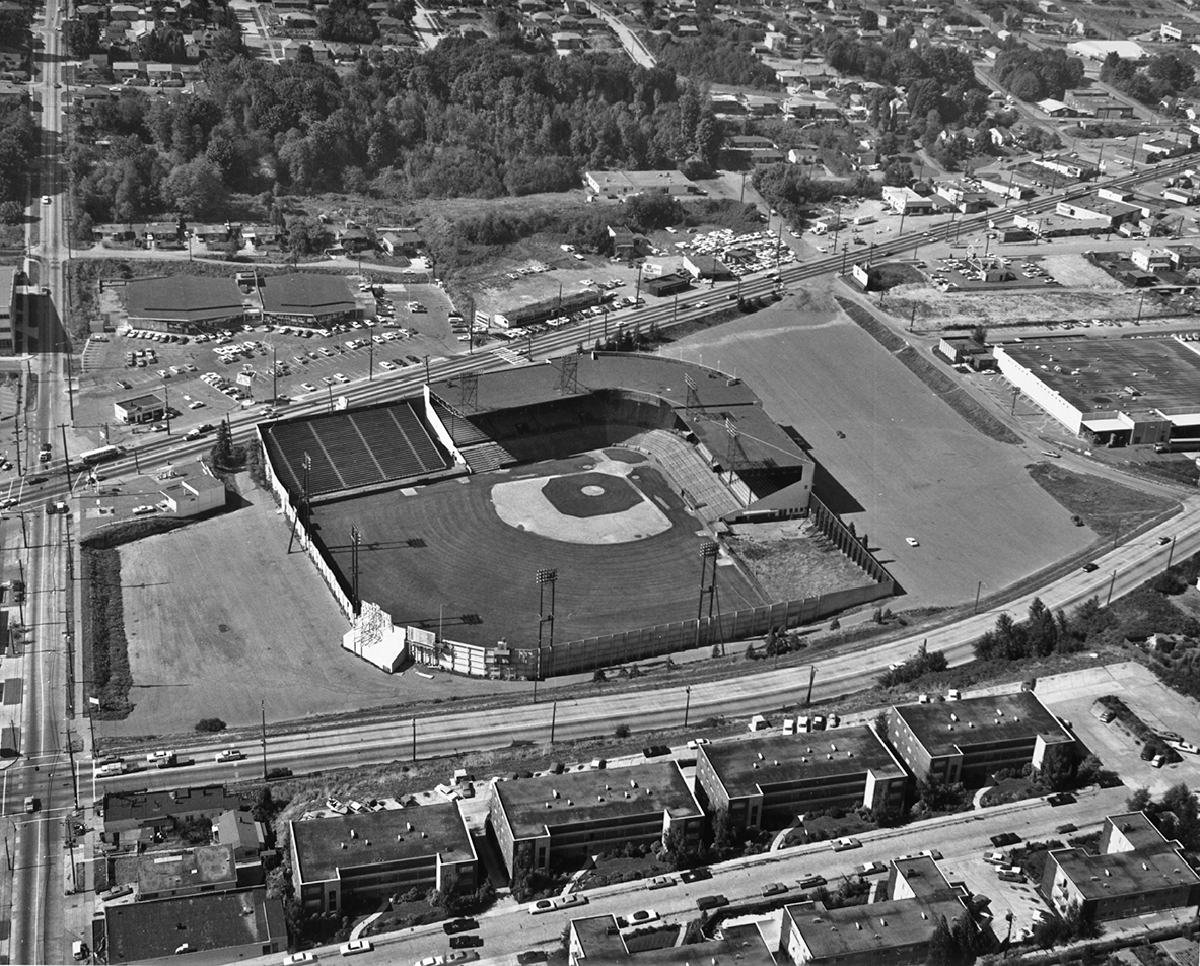
Sick's Stadium was built in 1938 and demolished in 1979.

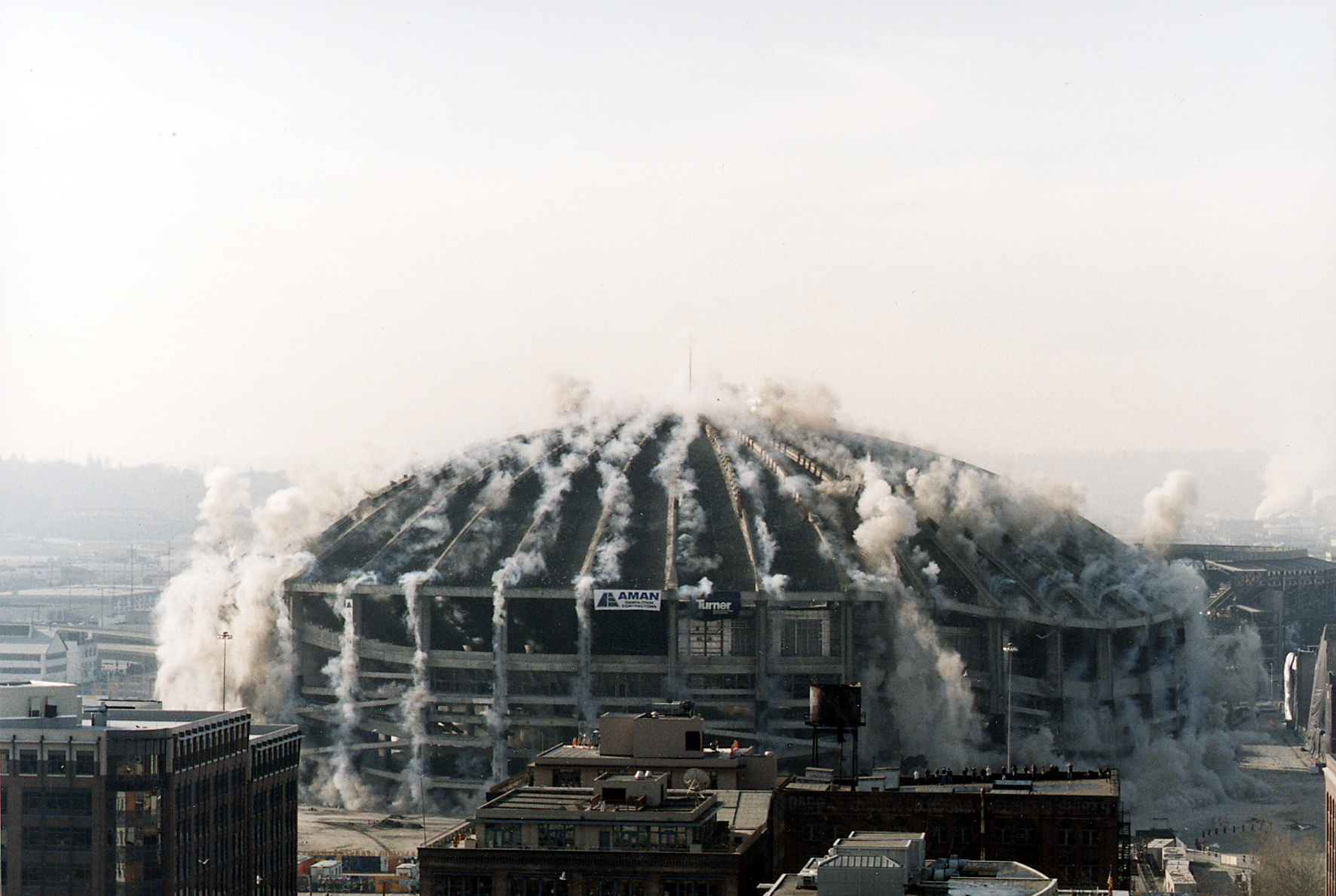
The Kingdome was imploded in 2000.

Stadium name	Year(s)	Capacity	Team(s)	Distance to Center Field	Ref
Madison Park	1892	N/A	Seattle Hustlers	N/A	
YMCA Field	1896–1903	N/A	Seattle Yannigans/Rainmakers, Seattle Clamdiggers, Seattle Chinooks	N/A	
Recreation Park Base Ball Grounds	1905	N/A	Seattle Siwashes	N/A	
Yesler Way Park	1907–1912	N/A	Seattle Siwashes, Seattle Turks, Seattle Giants	N/A	
Dugdale Field	~1900–1932	15,000	Seattle Giants, Ballard Pippins	N/A	
Civic Field	1932–1938	15,000	Seattle Indians, Seattle Rainiers	N/A	
Sick's Stadium	1938–1979	25,420	Seattle Rainiers, Seattle Angels, Seattle Pilots, Seattle Steelheads	405 feet (123 m)	
Kingdome	1976–2000	59,166	Seattle Mariners	405 feet (123 m)	
T-Mobile Park	1999–present	47,943	Seattle Mariners	409 feet (125 m)	

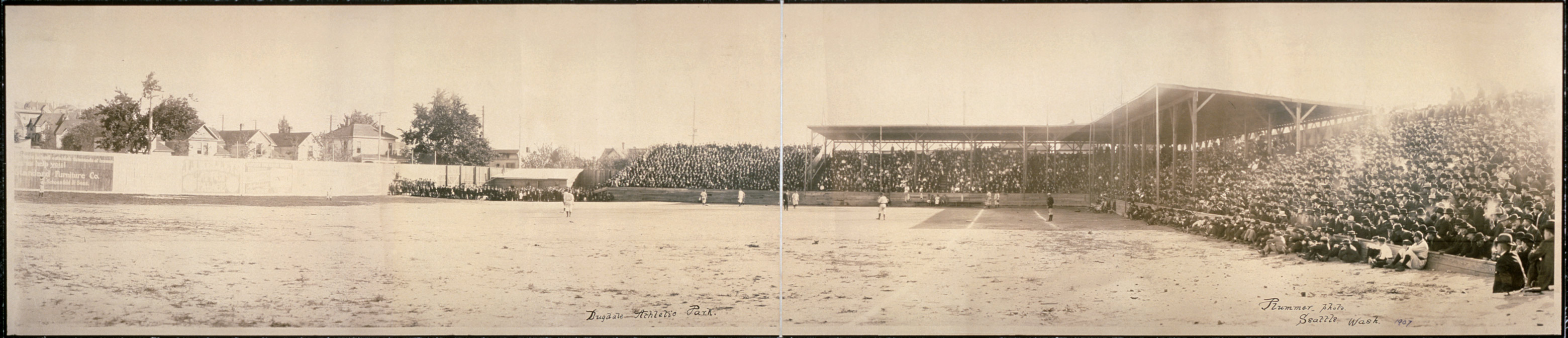
A panoramic view of Dugdale Field.

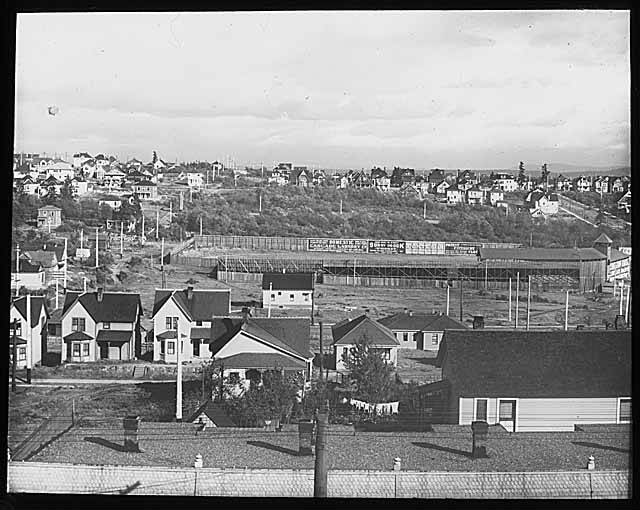
YMCA Field at 14th and Jefferson (1902)

YMCA Field, also known as Athletic Park, opened in 1895 at the corner of 14th and Jefferson streets, the ballpark closed after the 1903 season. Today, Seattle University's Championship Field soccer stadium occupies a large portion of the site of YMCA Field.

Dan Dugdale, who played on and owned several early Seattle professional teams, built Yesler Way Park and Dugdale Field. Dugdale Field burned down due to arson in 1932, so the Seattle minor league team relocated Civic Field, on the site of Memorial Stadium.

== See also ==
- List of current Major League Baseball stadiums
