= Seattle Rainiers =

- 1919–1976; (1919–1968, 1972–1976); Seattle, Washington

Team logo	Cap insignia

Minor league affiliations
- Previous classes: Class A – short season (1972–1976); Triple-A (1958–1968); Open (1952–1957); Triple-A (1945–1951); Double-A (1919–1945)
- League: Northwest League (1972–1976)
- Division: PCL West (1963–1968), NWL North (1972, 1975–1976), NWL West (1973–1974)
- Previous leagues: Pacific Coast League (1903–1906, 1919–1968); Northwestern League (1907–1918)

Major league affiliations
- Previous teams: Independent (1975–1976) Cincinnati Reds (1973–1974); Co-op (1972); Los Angeles / California Angels (1965–1968); Boston Red Sox (1961–1964); Cincinnati Redlegs/Reds (1956–1960); Detroit Tigers (1948); Boston Braves (1935, 1946)

Minor league titles
- League titles: 1909, 1912, 1915, 1924, 1940, 1941, 1942, 1951, 1955, 1966
- Division titles: 1966

Team data
- Previous names: Seattle Angels (1965–1968) Seattle Indians (1922–1937) Seattle Rainiers (1919–1922) Seattle Purple Sox (1919) Seattle Giants (1910–1920) Seattle Turks (1909) Seattle Siwashes (1903–1908)
- Colors: Red, navy blue, white
- Previous parks: Sick's Stadium (1938–1968, 1972–1976); Dugdale Field (1913–1932); Yesler Way Park (1907–1912)

The Seattle Rainiers, originally named the Seattle Indians and also known as the Seattle Angels, were a Minor League Baseball team in Seattle, Washington, that played in the Pacific Coast League from 1903 to 1906 and 1919 to 1968. They were previously named for the indigenous Native American population of the Pacific Northwest and changed their name after being acquired by the Rainier Brewing Company, which was named for nearby Mount Rainier.

== History ==
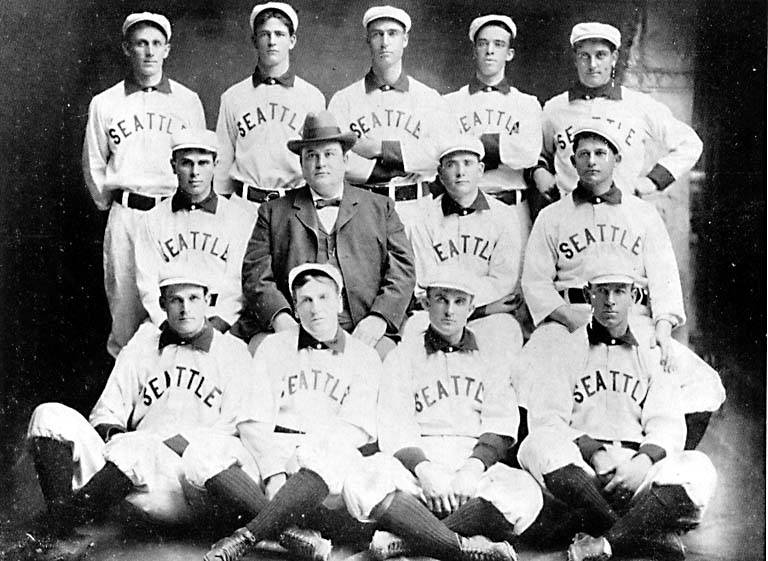
The 1902 Seattle Clamdiggers

Along with the Los Angeles Angels, Portland Beavers, Oakland Oaks, Sacramento Solons, and San Francisco Seals, Seattle was a charter member of the Pacific Coast League (PCL) which was founded in 1903, after the California League and the Pacific Northwest League merged. They were known in the Pacific Northwest League as the Seattle Clamdiggers. Though the team finished second in 1906, the PCL contracted from six teams to four after the season (mainly due to the failures of the Sacramento franchise). For the next 11 seasons, the team played in the Northwestern League, at the time a Class B league. Until 1908, the team was known as the Seattle Siwashes. In 1909, they won 109 games as the Seattle Turks. After a fan contest, the team was renamed the Seattle Giants. In 1913, owner Dan Dugdale built Dugdale Field, replacing Yesler Way Park, which he had built in 1907. Dugdale sold the team in January 1919.

Seattle re-entered the PCL in 1919 with Portland (which had dropped out of the league after 1917), bringing the number of teams in the league to eight. Seattle finished in last place that year, but jumped to second in 1920. During this transitional time, the team had different nicknames, including the Rainiers and Purple Sox before becoming the Indians in 1922. In 1924, the Indians won their first PCL pennant, clinching the title on the last day of the 202-game season.

For more than a decade after their championship run, the Indians were mired in the second division year after year. In July 1932, an arsonist burned the 15,000-seat Dugdale Field to the ground. Located at Rainier and McClellan Streets, it had been built in 1913. For the next six years, the team played at Civic Stadium, which had grassless, hardpan dirt playing field.

The team's fortunes improved in 1938 when Emil Sick, owner of Seattle's Rainier Brewing Company, bought the Indians from owner Bill Klepper for $100,000 and renamed them the Seattle Rainiers. He began construction of Sick's Stadium, a 15,000-seat facility on the site of old Dugdale Field. Sick invested in the team, and it bore results. The Rainiers finished first in 1939, 1940 and 1941. They lost the postseason series in 1939, but won pennants in 1940 and 1941. In 1942 and 1943, the Rainiers finished in third place, but did win another PCL pennant in 1942.

After a few lean years, the Rainiers won PCL flags in 1951 and 1955, the last pennants won under Sick's ownership. After the 1960 season, the team was sold to the Boston Red Sox. The Red Sox in turn sold the Rainiers to the Los Angeles/California Angels in 1965, who renamed the team the Seattle Angels, as they were known during their last four seasons.

The last hurrah for the Rainiers-turned-Angels came in 1966, when the Seattle Angels won the championship of the PCL's new Western Division (the PCL had absorbed former American Association teams in the midwestern and southwestern parts of the United States). In the playoffs, the Angels defeated the Eastern Division champion Tulsa Oilers, for Seattle's last PCL pennant.

The team's last year was 1968, in which they finished in eighth place overall. Seattle had been granted an expansion team in the American League, the ill-fated Seattle Pilots, which began play in 1969. The Pilots would last but one year in Seattle, before a bankruptcy court sold the team to a group headed by Bud Selig and were moved to Milwaukee in 1970.

== The Class A Rainiers ==
After the Pilots left, Seattle was without professional baseball for the first time since 1900. Following a two-year void, Art Peterson, a teacher who lived near Sacramento, California, bought the Bend Rainbows of the Class A Northwest League. He moved the team to Seattle, renamed them the Rainiers, and signed a deal to play in Sicks' Stadium, where the team inherited the Pilots' old offices. The Rainiers played five seasons in the NWL between 1972 and 1976 with two winning seasons.

The team was a co-op operation in 1972, drawing players primarily from the San Francisco and Baltimore minor league systems. Managed by former St. Louis Cardinals pitcher Ray Washburn, the Rainiers went into a tailspin in August and finished last in the NWL North Division. The Cincinnati Reds picked up Seattle as an affiliate for the next two seasons. The Rainiers came in with two second-place showings as the team groomed future major league pitchers Manny Sarmiento, Mike Armstrong, and outfielder Lynn Jones during that time, as well as manager Greg Riddoch. Peterson went the independent route for 1975 and 1976, signing his own players. One of those was outfielder Casey Sander, a Seattle native who played one season in 1975 before embarking upon an acting career, eventually landing a regular role in the ABC sitcom Grace Under Fire. The 1976 team had the best showing of the Rainiers' five-season run, finishing second by one game to the Portland Mavericks in the NWL's Northern Division.

On September 1, 1976, Seattle shut out Portland 2-0, with local product George Meyring winning the final professional baseball game in Sicks' Stadium.

In 1977, another American League expansion team was awarded to Seattle, the Seattle Mariners.

== Season-by-season record ==
Season	PDC	Division	Finish	Wins	Losses	Win%	Postseason	Manager	Attendance
Seattle Rainiers
1920			3rd	102	91	.528		Buzzy Wares	284,950
1921			4th	103	82	.557		Duke Kenworthy	235,096
Seattle Indians
1922			4th	90	107	.457		Walter McCredie, Bert Adams	166,817
1923			4th	99	97	.505		Harry Wolverton, Red Killefer	153,258
1924			1st	109	91	.545	League champions by virtue of best record	Red Killefer	232,502
1925			3rd	103	91	.545		Red Killefer	158,847
1926			7th	89	111	.445		Red Killefer	139,505
1927			3rd	98	92	.516		Red Killefer	145,997
1928			8th	64	127	.335		Jim Middleton	96,660
1929			8th	67	135	.332		Ernie Johnson	97,776
1930			6th	92	107	.462		Ernie Johnson	103,341
1931			4th	83	104	.444		Ernie Johnson	147,787
1932			6th	90	95	.486		Ernie Johnson, George Burns	74,012
1933			8th	65	119	.353		George Burns	79,064
1934			7th	81	102	.443		George Burns, Red Killefer	182,920
1935	BSN		7th	80	93	.462		Dutch Ruether	235,729
1936			4th	93	82	.531	Lost in semi-final series to Portland 0-4	Dutch Ruether	262,240
1937			7th	81	86	.458		Spencer Abbott, Johnny Bassler	144,866
Seattle Rainiers
1938			2nd	101	75	.571	Lost in semi-final series to San Francisco 1-4	Jack Lelivelt	309,723
1939			1st	101	73	.580	Lost in semi-final series to Los Angeles 2-4	Jack Lelivelt	355,792
1940			1st	112	66	.629	Defeated Oakland in semi-final series 4-1; Defeated Los Angeles in championship series 4-1	Jack Lelivelt	295,820
1941			1st	104	70	.598	Defeated Hollywood in semi-final series 4-3; Defeated Sacramento in championship series 4-3	Bill Skiff	273,855
1942			3rd	96	82	.539	Defeated Sacramento in semi-final series 4-1; Defeated Los Angeles in championship series 4-2	Bill Skiff	250,779
1943			3rd	85	70	.548	Defeated Los Angeles in semi-final series 4-0; Lost to San Francisco in championship series 2-4	Bill Skiff	143,447

Division winner	League champions

== Affiliations ==
The Seattle Rainiers were affiliated with the following major league teams:

Year	Affiliation(s)
1935; 1946	Boston Braves
1948	Detroit Tigers
1956–1960; 1973–1974	Cincinnati Reds
1961–1964	Boston Red Sox
1965–1968 (as Seattle Angels)	Los Angeles/California Angels

== Notable Rainiers alumni ==
- Bob Lemon (1965–1966, MGR) Inducted Baseball Hall of Fame, 1976
- Joe Adcock (1968, MGR) 2× MLB All-Star
- Joe Black (1957) 1952 NL rookie of the Year
- Sam Bohne (originally "Sam Cohen")
- Jim Bouton (1968) MLB All-Star
- Tommy Bridges (1950) 6× MLB All-Star
- Lew Burdette (1967) 3× MLB All-Star; 1957 World Series Most Valuable Player
- George Burns (1933) 1926 AL Most Valuable Player
- Tom Burgmeier (1965–1966) MLB All-Star
- Ryne Duren (1955) 4× MLB All-Star
- Rollie Hemsley (1948) 5× MLB All-Star
- Babe Herman (1925)
- Fred Hutchinson (1938) (1955 and 1959, MGR) MLB All-Star; 1957 MLB Manager of the Year
- Jay Johnstone (1966–1968)
- Jim Lonborg (1964) MLB All-Star; 1967 AL Cy Young Award
- Peanuts Lowrey (1959) MLB All-Star
- Jim McGlothlin (1965–1966) MLB All-Star
- Rudy May (1966) 1980 AL ERA Leader
- Andy Messersmith (1966, 1968) 4× MLB All-Star
- Claude Osteen (1958) 3× MLB All-Star
- Marty Pattin (1966, 1968) MLB All-Star
- Johnny Pesky (1961–1962, MGR) MLB All-Star
- Rico Petrocelli (1964) 2× MLB All-Star
- Vada Pinson (1958) 4× MLB All-Star
- Dick Radatz (1961) 2× MLB All-Star
- Jim Rivera (1921–2017), MLB player, AL stolen base and triples leader
- Dutch Ruether (1935–1936, MGR)
- Connie Ryan (1958, MGR) MLB All-Star
- Luke Sewell (1956, MGR) MLB All-Star
- Rip Sewell (1933) 4× MLB All-Star
- Chuck Tanner (1967, MGR) Manager: 1979 World Series champion – Pittsburgh Pirates
- Earl Torgeson (1946)
- Sammy White (1949) MLB All-Star
- Maury Wills (1957) 7× MLB All-Star; 1962 NL Most Valuable Player
- Earl Wilson (1961)
- Wilbur Wood (1963–1964) 3× MLB All-Star
- Clyde Wright (1967) MLB All-Star

== Players ==
- Seattle Rainiers players

== Legacy ==
The Mariners have worn Rainiers uniforms as a turn back the clock promotion.

In 1995, the Tacoma Tigers, the Mariners Triple-A affiliate, adopted the Rainiers name and have been using it ever since.

Preceded by Minneapolis Millers	Boston Red Sox; Triple-A affiliate 1961–1964	Succeeded by Toronto Maple Leafs
