= Sick's Stadium =

Former stadium in Seattle, Washington (1938–1976)

- Sick's Seattle Stadium
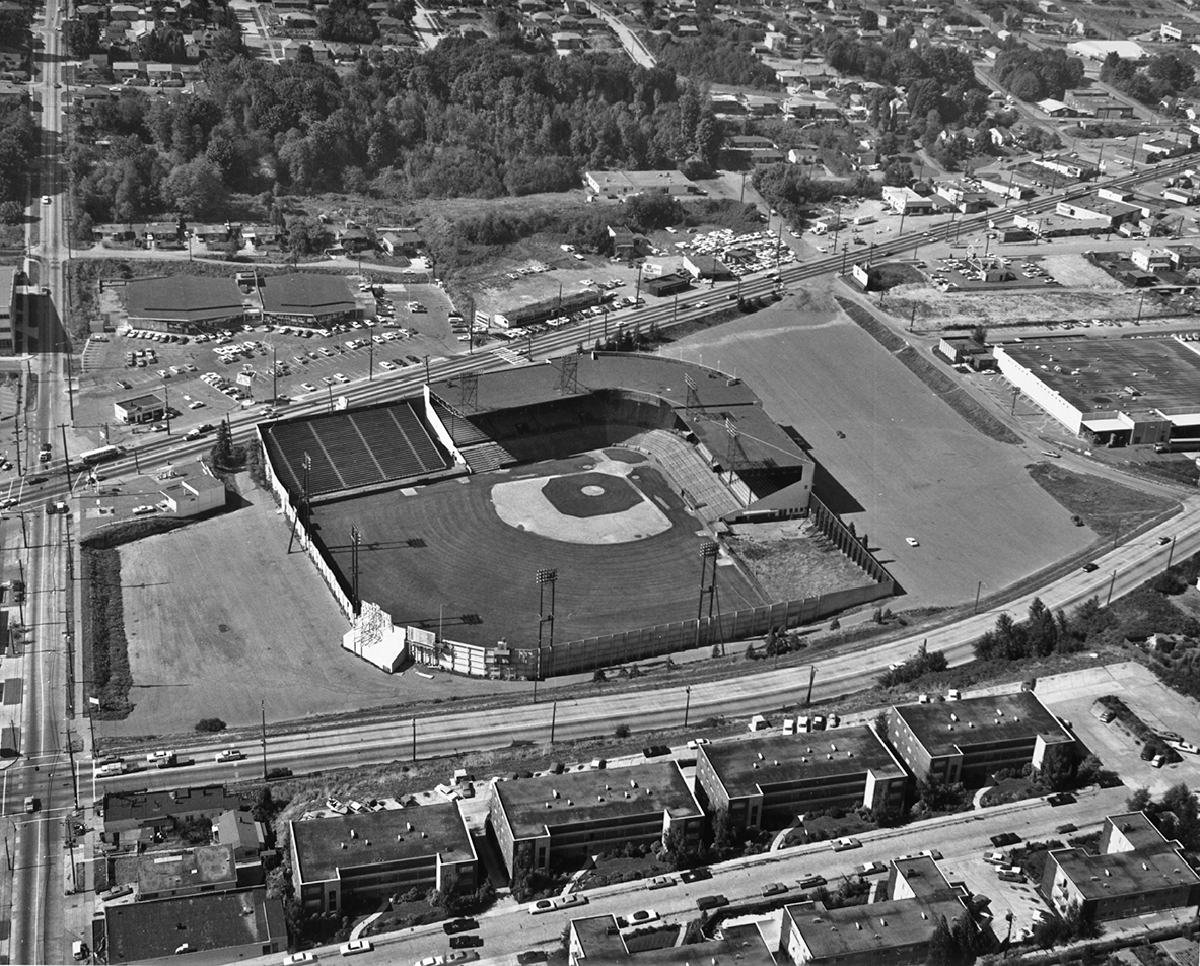
- Aerial view from east in 1967

- Location within the United States Location within Washington (state)
- Interactive map of Sick's Stadium
- Address: 2700 Rainier Avenue South
- Location: Rainier Valley; Seattle, Washington, U.S.
- Coordinates: 47.58°N 122.298°W
- Elevation: 60 feet (18 m) AMSL
- Owner: Emil Sick (1938–1964); Sick family (1964–1965); City of Seattle (1965–1979)
- Capacity: 11,000 (1938); 18,000 (April 1969); 25,420 (June 1969)
- Surface: Natural grass
- Field size: 1938; Left field – 325 ft (99 m); Center field – 400 ft (122 m); Right field – 325 ft (99 m) 1969; Left field – 305 ft (93 m); Center field – 402 ft (123 m); Right field – 325 ft (99 m)

Construction
- Opened: June 15, 1938; 88 years ago
- Closed: 1976; 50 years ago
- Demolished: February 1979
- Cost: $350,000 ($8.01 million in 2025)

Tenants
- Seattle Rainiers/Angels (PCL) (1938–1968); Seattle Steelheads (Negro leagues) (1946); Seattle Pilots (MLB) (1969); Seattle Rainiers (NWL) (1972–1976); Washington Huskies (NCAA Pac-8) (1973)

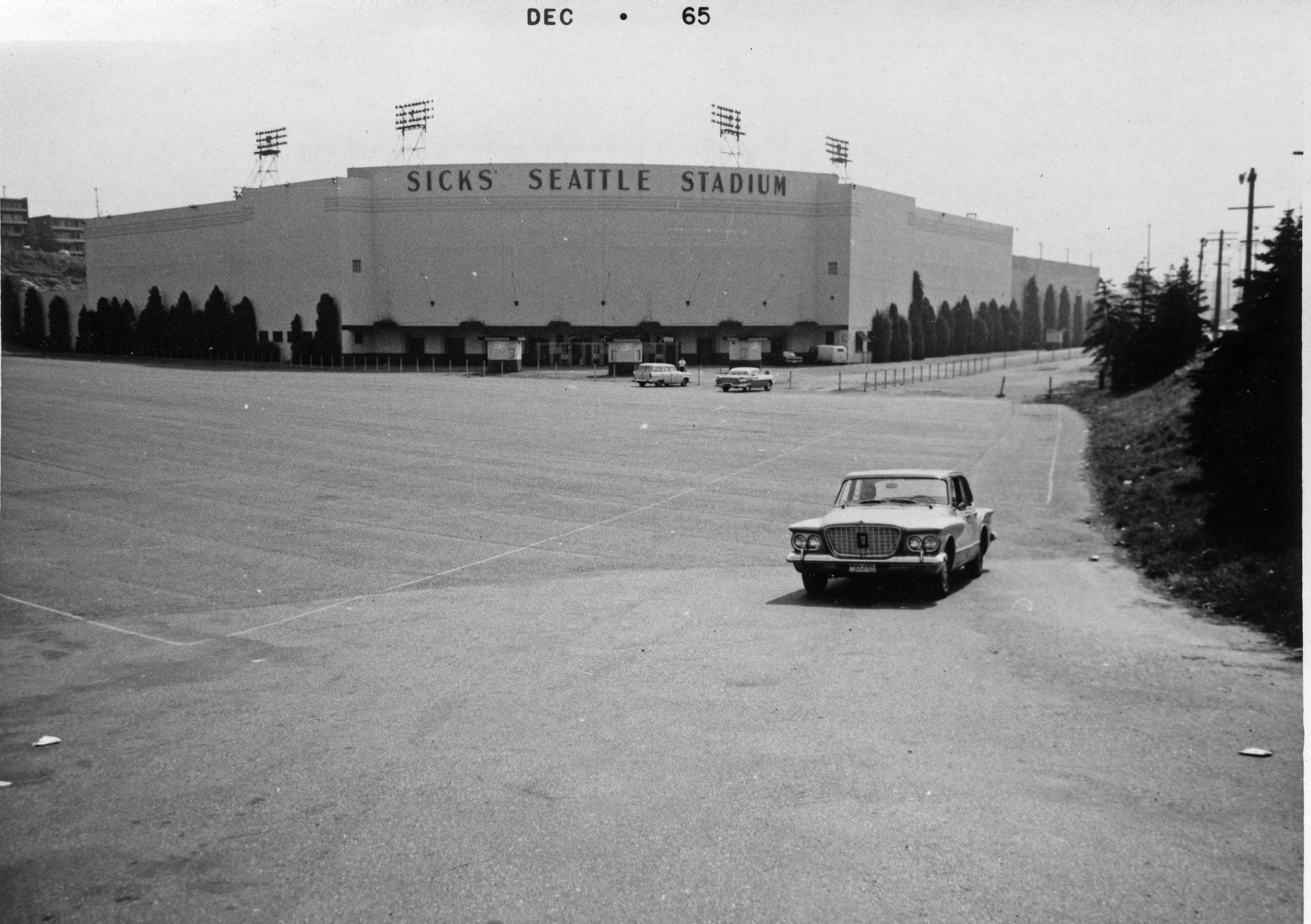
Sick's Stadium in 1965

Sick's Stadium, also known as Sick's Seattle Stadium and later as Sicks' Stadium, was a baseball park in the northwest United States in Seattle, Washington. It was located in Rainier Valley, on the NE corner of S. McClellan Street and Rainier Avenue S (currently the site of a Lowe's hardware store). The longtime home of the Seattle Rainiers of the Pacific Coast League (PCL), it hosted the expansion Seattle Pilots during their only major league season in 1969.

The site was previously the location of Dugdale Field, a 1913 ballpark that was the home of the Rainiers' forerunners, the Seattle Indians. That park burned down in an Independence Day arson fire in 1932, caused by serial arsonist Robert Driscoll. Authorities would later claim that Driscoll was one of the most dangerous arsonists in the United States during the Great Depression. Until a new stadium could be built on the Dugdale site, the team played at Civic Field, a converted football stadium at the current location of Seattle Center's Memorial Stadium.

== Baseball ==
=== Minor league years ===
Sick's Stadium first opened on June 15, 1938, as the home field of the Seattle Rainiers (formerly the Seattle Indians) of the Pacific Coast League (PCL). It was named after Emil Sick, owner of the team and of the Rainier Brewing Company. The stadium was constructed five years after a previous ballpark at the location, named Dugdale Field, was destroyed in an arson fire. The Rainiers played at the stadium through 1968, though they changed their name to the Seattle Angels in 1964. In 1946, the stadium was briefly the home of the Negro league Seattle Steelheads of the short-lived West Coast Negro Baseball Association, who played at the stadium while the Rainiers were on the road.

After Emil Sick died in 1964, and various members of his family shared ownership, the name of the park was changed to reflect that fact, from the singular possessive form "Sick's Stadium" to the plural possessive form "Sicks' Stadium".

The city bought the stadium in 1965, in anticipation that part of the property was needed for a proposed freeway.

The field alignment was southeast, home plate to center field, which results in difficult visibility conditions for the left side of the defense in the early evening hours. The recommended alignment is east-northeast.

=== Seattle Pilots ===
On April 11, 1969, Major League Baseball came to Seattle with the American League expansion Seattle Pilots debuting at Sick's Stadium. Seattle had been mentioned earlier in the decade as a possible major league city. However, Sick's Stadium had not aged gracefully. While it had once been considered one of the best stadiums in the minors, it had not been well maintained in the four years since the city bought it. The park's rapid deterioration was obvious by the time the Cleveland Indians considered moving to Seattle in the early part of the decade. Owner William Daley dispatched general manager Gabe Paul to scout out the city. When city officials balked at paying for the upgrades necessary to bring Sick's Stadium up to something approaching major league standards, Paul advised Daley against moving to Seattle. Charlie Finley considered moving the Kansas City Athletics to Seattle in 1967, but when he came to scout out Sick's Stadium, he quipped that it was a "pigsty" and refused to consider playing there even on a temporary basis.

When the American League finally granted the franchise in October 1967, it explicitly stated that Sick's Stadium was not suitable as a major league facility, and was only to be used on a temporary basis until a domed stadium could be completed.

It soon became obvious why Daley (who bought a stake in the Pilots) and Finley were wary about Sick's. It was understood that the American League wanted Sick's Stadium expanded to at least 30,000 seats by Opening Day 1969, but the league did not formally specify that figure in the franchise agreement. Eventually, the city agreed to spend at least $1.175 million to expand the stadium to 28,000 seats. That figure dropped to 25,000 when none of the bids budgeted for expanded seating. However, work didn't begin in earnest until January, three months before Opening Day. Cost overruns brought the final renovation bill to $1.5 million. Due to poor weather and other delays, only 18,000 seats were ready by opening day. While 15,014 people showed up, those sitting in left field had to wait three innings to take their seats because workers were still putting them together by the time of the first pitch. The new right-field bleachers were nowhere near completed. There were no restrooms in some parts of the seating bowl or in any bleacher sections, forcing many fans to make do with port-a-potties. Seats in several sections had just been finished when the Pilots returned from their second road trip. However, the paint hadn't dried by the start of a May 6 game, forcing the Pilots to foot numerous cleaning bills.

In the Pilots' defense, they were originally set to begin play in 1971, but the date was moved up two years when Senator Stuart Symington of Missouri demanded that the Pilots' expansion brethren, the Kansas City Royals, start play in 1969. Professional baseball had been played in Kansas City in one form or another from 1883 until the A's left for Oakland after the 1967 season, and Symington would not accept the prospect of Kansas City having to wait three seasons for baseball to return. This forced Seattle to hurriedly start play in 1969 as well in order to balance the schedule.

By the middle of the season, it was obvious that Sick's Stadium was completely inadequate even for temporary use. The stadium expanded to 25,000 seats by June, but many of those seats had obstructed views. There were no field-level camera pits, so photographers had to set up their equipment atop the grandstand roof. The clubhouse facilities were second-class. Also, no upgrades were made to the stadium's piping, resulting in almost nonexistent water pressure when attendance was anywhere near capacity. The visiting team's announcers couldn't see any plays along third base or left field. The Pilots had to place a mirror in the press box, and the visiting announcers had to look into it and "refract" plays in those areas.

Under the circumstances, only 678,000 fans came to see the Pilots, 20th out of 24 teams and nowhere near enough to break even. The team was forced into bankruptcy after only one season. Despite the poor stadium conditions, the ticket prices were among the highest in the major leagues. The team was sold out of bankruptcy court to a Milwaukee-based group on March 31, and the team moved at the end of spring training for the 1970 season and became the Milwaukee Brewers (Milwaukee had lost the Braves to Atlanta after the 1965 season).

After two years without pro baseball, Seattle fielded a second Rainiers team that played in the Class A Northwest League between 1972 and 1976 before giving way to the major league Mariners at the Kingdome. The last professional baseball game at Sicks' Stadium was played September 1, 1976, when local product George Meyring pitched a 2-0 shutout for the Rainiers over the rival Portland Mavericks.

== Concerts and other events ==
Though Sick's Stadium was primarily a baseball venue, it also occasionally held other events, including rock concerts — most famously, an Elvis Presley concert on September 1, 1957 (one of the first concerts to be held at a major outdoor stadium), which was attended by a young Jimi Hendrix. The Sunday night concert followed an afternoon ball game during the Labor Day weekend. Hendrix himself later performed at the stadium in the rain on July 26, 1970, as did Janis Joplin, just months before their respective deaths.

In boxing, Floyd Patterson knocked out Olympic gold medalist Pete Rademacher in six rounds on August 22, 1957. Future heavyweight champion Sonny Liston defeated Portland's Eddie Machen in a 12-round decision at Sick's on September 7, 1960.

== After the Pilots ==
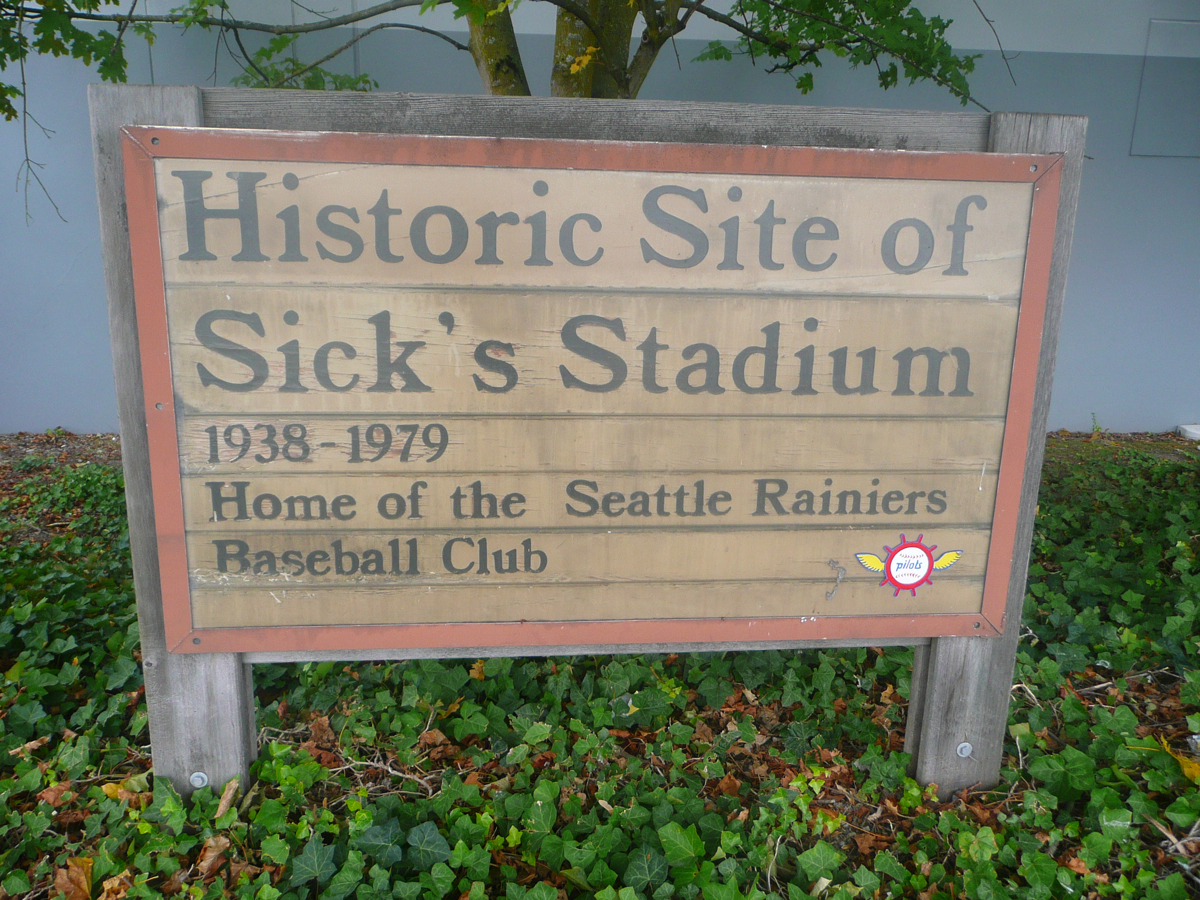
Sign outside Lowe's store in 2009, marking the site of Sick's Stadium

From 1972 to 1976, a new Seattle Rainiers team, in the short-season Class A Northwest League, played at Sicks' to sparse audiences. The major leagues returned in 1977 with the expansion Seattle Mariners at the new Kingdome (originally approved by area voters as a condition of getting the Pilots).

The Washington Huskies baseball team used the venue during the 1973 season while their on-campus venue, Graves Field, was renovated.

In 1979, Sicks' Stadium was demolished, and an Eagle Hardware & Garden store opened there in 1992, which became a Lowe's home improvement store in 1999. The stadium site is currently marked by a sign (on the corner of Rainier and McClellan) and a replica of home plate (near the store's exit) as well as markings inside the store where the bases were. 60 ft 6 in (18.44 m) from home plate, near the cash registers, is a circle where the mound and pitching rubber were. The store has a glass display case containing mementos of the Pilots, Rainiers, and Angels.

Most of the primary assets of Sick's were bought for $60,000 in 1978 by Harry Ornest, the owner of the new Vancouver Canadians for use at Nat Bailey Stadium in Vancouver, British Columbia. Another purchaser was Washington State University in Pullman, which bought bleachers, fencing, and the foul poles in 1979 to construct the new Buck Bailey Field. The bleachers did not fit well and were later sold.

Several dozen box seats from Sicks' Stadium were transported to Alaska and installed in Growden Memorial Park in Fairbanks, which hosts collegiate summer baseball.

Preceded by First ballpark	Home of the Seattle Pilots; 1969	Succeeded by Milwaukee County Stadium
