= Dugdale Field =

Baseball stadium in Seattle, United States

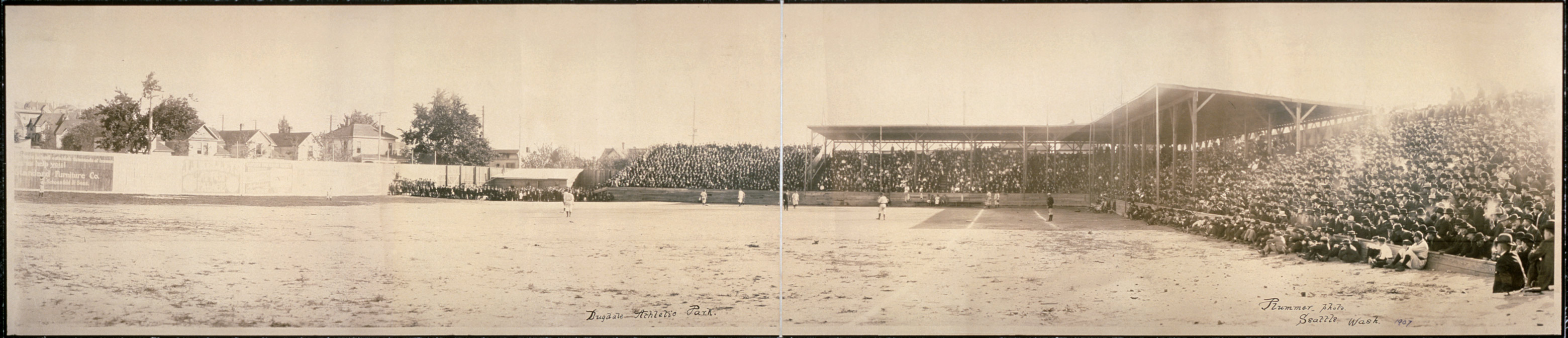
- Panoramic photo of Yesler Way Park, the predecessor to Dugdale Field, in 1907
- Location: Seattle, Washington
- Capacity: 15,000
- Surface: Natural grass

Construction
- Opened: 1913
- Closed: July 1932
- Demolished: July 1932

Tenants
- Seattle Indians (1913–1932); Seattle Giants (1913–1920); Ballard Pippins (1914)

Dugdale Field was a baseball stadium in the Rainier Valley of Seattle, Washington, United States. It was the home of Seattle Indians and Seattle Giants and had a capacity of 15,000 people. It opened in 1913 and was destroyed by fire in July 1932. It was named for Daniel E. Dugdale, a baseball pioneer in the area who had founded several teams.

The city's first ballpark was built in 1898 at 13th Avenue and Jefferson Street adjacent to a YMCA in the Central District; it was primarily used on weekdays, while Sunday games were played at Madison Park. Dugdale had built a previous ball park called Yesler Way Park, at the intersection of 12th Avenue and Yesler Way in 1907; it was often referred to as Dugdale Park but predates the larger and later stadium built in Rainier Valley. An exhibition game between the Seattle All Stars and Southwest Timber League on October 19, 1924, featured Babe Ruth, who hit three home runs for the All Stars.

Dugdale Field also hosted the first football game featuring an NFL team in Seattle. On January 31, 1926, the Chicago Bears beat the Washington All Stars 34–0 in an exhibition game. Dugdale Field was burned down in an arson fire on July 4, 1932. Sick's Stadium was built at the same location, and the Indians were renamed the Rainiers after they moved there in 1938.
