= William Sumrall =

American baseball player

- Pitcher
- Born: December 4, 1916; Deering, Missouri, U.S.
- Died: October 29, 1964 (aged 47); Gary, Indiana, U.S.

Negro league baseball debut
- 1938, for the New York Black Yankees

Last appearance
- 1940, for the Memphis Red Sox

Teams
- New York Black Yankees (1938); Memphis Red Sox (1940)

William Howard Sumrall (December 4, 1916 – October 29, 1964), alternately spelled "Summerall" and nicknamed "Big Train", was an American Negro league pitcher between 1938 and 1940.

A native of Deering, Missouri, Sumrall played for the New York Black Yankees in 1938, and went on to play for the Memphis Red Sox in 1940. Sumrall died in Gary, Indiana in 1964 at age 47.
