= Ike Samuels =

American baseball player (1874–1964)

- Third baseman
- Born: February 20, 1874; Quincy, Illinois, U.S.
- Died: February 22, 1964 (aged 90); New York City, New York, U.S.
- Batted: Right Threw: Right

MLB debut
- August 3, 1895, for the St. Louis Browns

Last MLB appearance
- September 28, 1895, for the St. Louis Browns

MLB statistics
- Batting average: .230
- Home runs: 0
- Runs batted in: 5
- Stats at Baseball Reference

Teams
- St. Louis Browns (1895)

Samuel Earl Samuels (February 20, 1874 – February 22, 1964) was an American third baseman for the St. Louis Browns of the National League in 1895. He was born in Quincy, Illinois, and was Jewish.
