= Emil Sick =

American businessman (1894–1964)

- Born: June 3, 1894; Tacoma, Washington, U.S.
- Died: November 10, 1964 (aged 70); Seattle, Washington, U.S.
- Resting place: Acacia Memorial Park and Funeral Home, Lake Forest Park, King County, Washington
- Spouses: Kathleen Thelma McPhee (m. 1918-1962); Martha Gardner (m. 1963)
- Relatives: Shirley Douglas (daughter-in-law)

Emil George Sick (June 3, 1894 – November 10, 1964) was a Canadian-American brewing worker and industrialist in Canada and later the U.S. He is best known for his involvement as owner of baseball teams and stadiums in Seattle and Vancouver, British Columbia, from the 1930s until 1960.

In 1928, he founded, with Frederick McCall, an aviation company, the Great Western Airways, which acquired Purple Label Airlines operating a Stinson Detroiter.

In 2007, he was posthumously inducted into the Pacific Coast League Hall of Fame.

== See also ==
- Rainier Brewing Company
