= Brooks Holder =

American baseball player

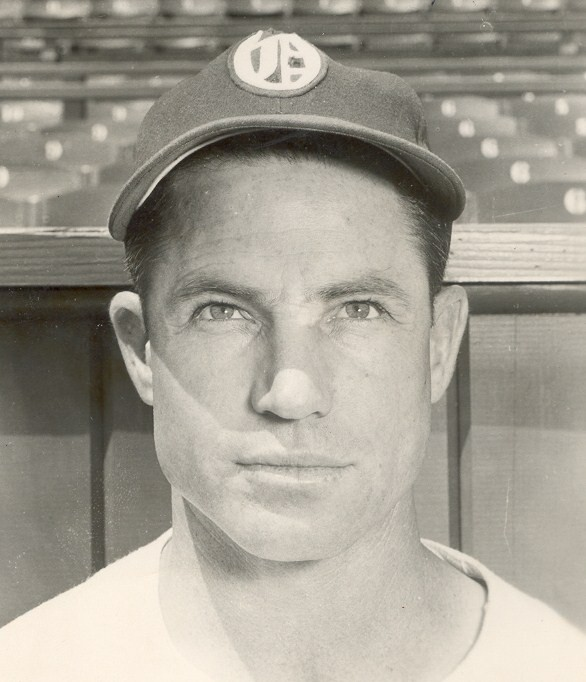
- Second baseman / Outfielder
- Born: November 2, 1914; Rising Star, Texas, U.S.
- Died: June 7, 1986 (aged 71); Pinole, California, U.S.
- Batted: Left Threw: Left

Professional debut
- WL: 1935, for the Des Moines Demons
- PCL: 1935, for the San Francisco Seals

Last appearance
- WL: 1935, for the Des Moines Demons
- PCL: 1951, for the Portland Beavers

Minor League Baseball statistics
- Batting average: .295
- Hits: 2,540
- Home runs: 98
- Stats at Baseball Reference

Teams
- Des Moines Demons (WL, 1935); San Francisco Seals (PCL, 1935–1942; 1949–1950); Hollywood Stars (PCL, 1943–45); Oakland Oaks (PCL, 1946–48); Portland Beavers (PCL, 1951)

Member of the Pacific Coast League

Baseball Hall of Fame
- Induction: 2004

Richard Brooks Holder (November 2, 1914 – June 7, 1986) was an American professional baseball player whose career spanned 17 seasons, all of which were spent in the minor leagues. Holder joined the Pacific Coast League (PCL) in 1935 after a short stint that season in the Western League. Over his tenure in the PCL, he played for the San Francisco Seals (1935–1942, 1949–1950), Hollywood Stars (1943–45), Oakland Oaks (1946–48), and Portland Beavers (1951). His career batting average stands at .295 with 2,540 hits, 417 doubles, 117 triples, and 98 home runs in 2,492 games played. Despite being left-handed, Holder was used as a second baseman early in his career, a position that is usually reserved for right-handed players. After the 1937 season, he appeared exclusively as an outfielder. During his playing career, Holder stood at 5 feet 10 inches (178 cm) and weighed 180 lb (82 kg).

Author, historian and sports journalist David Halberstam is said to have noted in passing in one of his books that Holder was a "great hitter with good speed", but had difficulty on defense, primarily with catching the ball. In over a decade as an outfielder, Holder had a .975 fielding percentage with only 115 errors in over 4,600 chances, while batting .295 in 17 seasons with 117 triples. In 2004, the PCL enshrined Holder in the Pacific Coast League Hall of Fame. He was one of 12 players that year to be inducted.

== Early and personal life ==
Holder was born on November 2, 1914, in Rising Star, Texas, to John C. and Nora E. Holder, who were of Scotch-Irish descent. In 1920, the Holder family was living in Liberty, Arizona. By age 15, Brooks Holder was living in Contra Costa County, California, with his parents and sister, Voline L. Holder. Brooks Holder attended John Sweet High School in Crockett, California, where he played baseball, basketball, and football. In all three of those sports, he was a league all-star.

During the off-seasons of his playing career, Holder found employment as a factory worker in a sugar refinery. In 1951, a February edition of Baseball Digest indicated that Holder worked in a meat packing plant in the San Francisco area.

For recreation, Holder enjoyed outdoor activities, which included hunting and fishing. In October 1938, Holder married Arlene Smith of Crockett, California. By 1943, his wife and he had three children. In 1946, Holder's father died in an automobile accident. Holder and his family resided in San Francisco during the off-seasons.

Holder's sister skated in the Ice Capades in the 1940s and 1950s. She was married to pioneering acrobatic figure skater, and original Ice Capades cast member, Eddie Raiche, who was a member of The Hub Trio with Ken and Leonard Mullen. Voline Raiche skated with the Ice Capades until pregnant with her third child in 1956. She later became a commercial airplane pilot and owner of the Terra Sphere Chemical Company.

== Professional career ==
In 1935, Holder began his professional baseball career. He played with the Class A Des Moines Demons of the Western League for the first part of the season, batting .304 with 105 hits, 14 doubles, 13 triples, and one home run in 88 games played with Des Moines. Defensively, Holder, who played exclusively at second base for the Demons that year, compiled a .946 fielding percentage. Holder managed to place third overall on the league's triples leaderboard, finishing just behind Charles Clements (15) Auggie Luther (14).

During the 1935 season, Holder joined the Double-A San Francisco Seals of the PCL. The PCL was Double-A level until 1946, when it became Triple-A. The Seals brought him in to replace their regular second baseman, Art Garibaldi, who was sold to the St. Louis Cardinals. Holder played the remainder of the season with San Francisco, batting .250 with 12 hits in 48 at-bats. Holder's fielding percentage increased after joining the Seals, going from .946 to a combined .948 between the two clubs. Overall as a member of the Seals, his fielding percentage was .958.

One of his 1935 Seals' teammates was future Hall of fame center fielder Joe DiMaggio. Holder also was teammates with Dominic and Vince DiMaggio during his career. His manager in San Francisco was Lefty O'Doul, who managed 23 years in the PCL, and had a .349 lifetime batting average as a player in the major leagues.

Holder spent his first full season with the San Francisco Seals in 1936. In 152 games played, he compiled a .289 batting average with 27 doubles, 11 triples, and one home run. In the field, Holder played at second base, putting up a .953 fielding percentage. In 1937, Holder cracked the Seals' Opening Day lineup. In May, he was converted to an outfielder after injuries to Seals players Ted Norbert and Johnny Gill. Holder finished the season with a .319 average with 155 hits, 27 doubles, eight triples, and two home runs in 135 games played. His fielding percentage that season was .968. In July 1938, the Associated Press noted that Holder might be signing with a Major League Baseball (MLB) team that season, although nothing ever came of it. On the season, Holder batted .330 with 193 hits, 26 doubles, eight triples, and two home runs in 172 games played. Among PCL batters that year, he finished fourth in batting average. On defense, he compiled a .980 fielding percentage, nine points better than teammate and future American League all-star center fielder Dominic DiMaggio.

Before the start of the 1939 season, Holder resigned with the Seals. That year, he batted .314 with 200 hits, 34 doubles, 24 triples, and five home runs in 173 games played. He led all league batters that season in triples. Holder's triples mark tied the all-time PCL record, which had been set by Truck Eagan in 1903. His fielding percentage that year was .969. After the season, Holder was pegged by the Seals to be drafted or purchased by an MLB team, but was passed-up by scouts. In February 1940, he resigned with San Francisco. On the year, Holder batted .274 with 143 hits, 19 doubles, seven triples, and one home run in 152 games played. Defensively, he had a .962 fielding percentage.

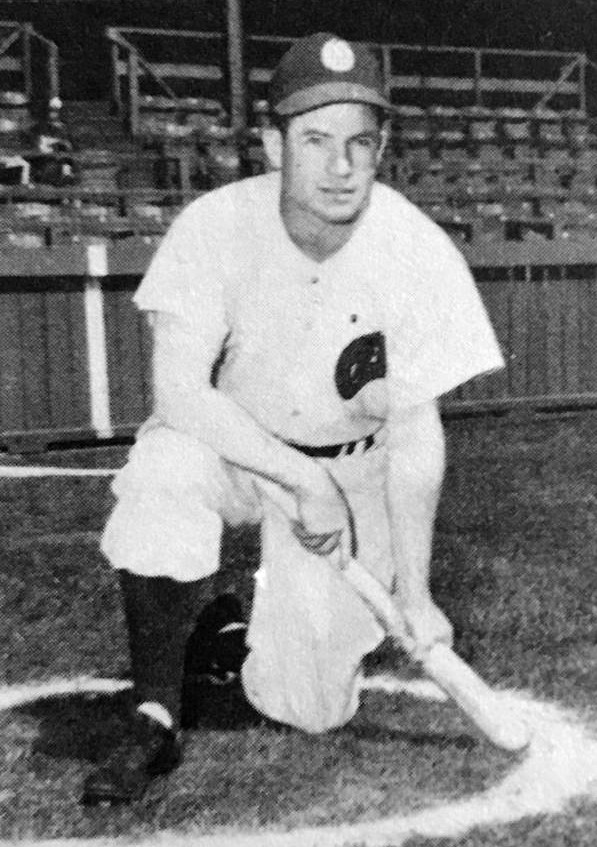
Holder in 1947, as a member of the Oakland Oaks

During the 1941 season, Holder played 170 games with the Seals, batting .280 with 119 runs, 175 hits, 30 doubles, 10 triples, two home runs, 53 runs batted in (RBIs), and 11 stolen bases. In the outfield, he compiled a team-best .982 fielding percentage with 19 assists. In 1942, Holder continued his tenure in San Francisco, batting .298 with 113 runs scored, 194 hits, 36 doubles, 9 triples, six home runs, and 51 RBIs in 179 games played. Defensively, he put up a .979 fielding percentage.

Before the start of the 1943 season Holder was a holdout, seeking a higher salary than the Seals were offering, which had also been the case in prior seasons with the Seals. The Seals were in talks with the Boston Braves, an MLB franchise, about selling Holder to them. However, nothing ever came of it; instead, the Seals traded Holder to the Hollywood Stars in exchange for Frenchy Uhalt and Del Young, who had been holding out themselves from signing with the Stars. In May 1943, Holder sustained a knee injury, which caused him to miss some playing time. During his first season with the Stars, Holder batted .273 with 83 runs scored, 148 hits, 27 doubles, five triples, six home runs, 62 RBIs, and 11 stolen bases. Defensively, he compiled a .975 fielding percentage.

In March 1944, Holder resigned with the Stars. On the season, he batted .280 with 119 runs scored, 163 hits, 28 doubles, eight triples, six home runs, 54 RBIs, and 21 stolen bases in 161 games played. Holder placed second in league in runs scored, behind Cecil Garriott, who had 148. In the outfield, Holder compiled a team-leading .983 fielding percentage with 18 assists and six double plays to only seven errors.

Before the start of the 1945 season, Holder was dubbed a "holdout" because he initially did not resign with the Stars. The Los Angeles Times described him as "stubborn" during the re-signing process. However, he eventually came to terms with the Stars, and rejoined the club during spring training. In April of that season, Holder suffered a pulled muscle during a game, which caused him to miss some playing time. In July, he suffered another injury, this time to his elbow. In 109 games played that year, he batted .256 with 54 runs scored, 80 hits, 16 doubles, two triples, five home runs, 41 RBIs, and 13 stolen bases. He also compiled a team-leading .985 fielding percentage in the outfield.

Just before the start of spring training in 1946, the Hollywood Stars released Holder. He then joined the Oakland Oaks of the PCL. On June 13, just hours after attending the funeral for his father, Holder suited up for the Oaks and hit a home run and a double. In his first year with Oakland, Holder batted .283 with 88 runs scored, 135 hits, 15 doubles, three triples, 13 home runs, 59 RBIs, and 14 stolen bases in 155 games played. Defensively, he had a .974 fielding percentage.

The Los Angeles Times described Holder's 1947 campaign as "the best ball of his career", adding, "which is saying something". With the Oaks that season, he batted .311 with 137 runs scored, 186 hits, 40 doubles, four triples, 16 home runs, and 78 RBIs in 172 games played (the Oaks playing 186 games that year), with a .971 fielding percentage in the outfield. Holder was second in the league in runs scored, behind Tony Lupien, who had 147. On July 22, 1947, the Oaks held "Brooks Holder Night" in front of a large crowd, where he received numerous awards and gifts.

Holder's last season with Oakland came in 1948. That year, he batted .297 with 99 runs scored, 143 hits, 15 doubles, three triples, 10 home runs, 57 RBIs, and 11 stolen bases. He compiled a .979 fielding percentage defensively. The Oaks were PCL champions in 1948. He returned to the Seals (now Triple-A level) in 1949–50, batting .312 and .295 respectively. In 1950, at 35-years old, he also had 11 home runs (the third highest for his career) and 113 runs. His final season came in 1951 with the Portland Beavers, hitting .305 in 125 games.

== Legacy and playing style ==
Holder finished with a career batting average of .295, with 2,540 hits, 417 doubles, 117 triples, and 91 home runs in 2,492 games played. In 2004, he was inducted into the Pacific Coast League Hall of Fame in an inductee class that featured 11 other players, including Vean Gregg, Frank Kelleher, and Fay Thomas. Pulitzer Prize winning Vietnam War correspondent, author, historian, journalist and sometimes sports journalist David Halberstam wrote in his book The Teammates: A Portrait of Friendship, that Holder was a "good hitter with great speed". Holder had a reputation for not swinging at bad pitches.

Halberstam also noted in his book, based on a comment by Dom DiMaggio, that Holder had a difficult time catching the ball in the outfield. Despite that comment, Holder had a lifetime .975 fielding percentage in the outfield, making only 115 errors in 4,634 chances. In his three years with the Seals (1937–39), DiMaggio had a .970 fielding percentage; and as a major leaguer (with a .978 fielding percentage) DiMaggio was considered one of the greatest fielding center fielders of his era. Holder's Oakland Tribune obituary states Holder was "an outfielder noted for his speed and defensive proficiency". When Holder started with the Seals as an infielder in 1935 he had a weak arm, but after taking on center field, he eventually improved his throwing and was respected by base runners in the PCL.

== Death ==
Holder died on June 7, 1986, after a short illness. He was survived by his wife Arlene, sons Brooks II and Jeff, and sister Voline.
