= Lou Novikoff =

American baseball player (1915–1970)

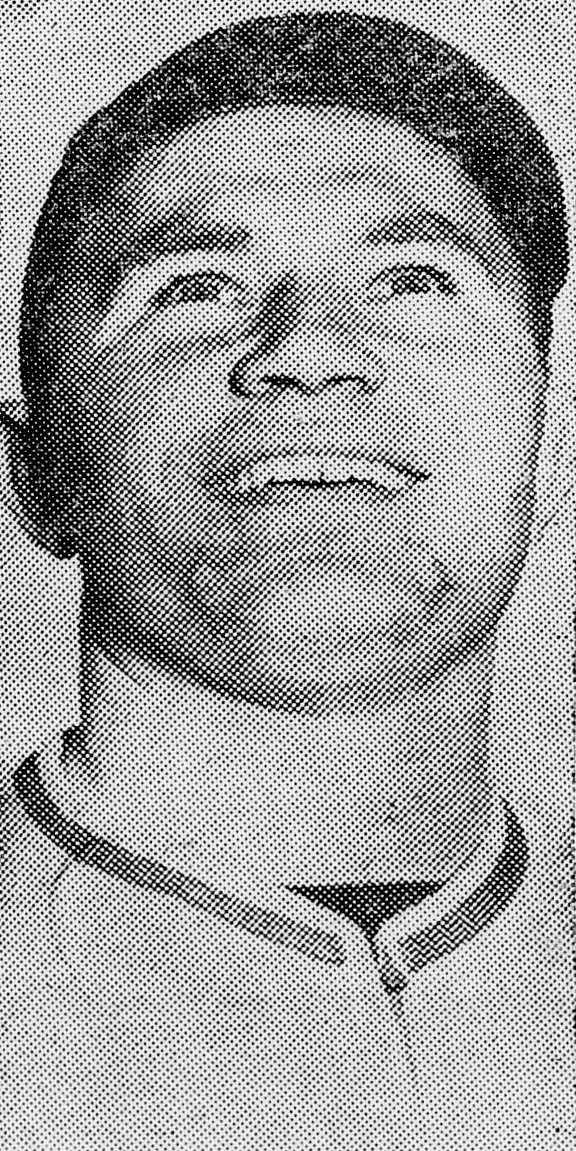
- Novikoff with the Chicago Cubs
- Left fielder
- Born: October 12, 1915; Glendale, Arizona, U.S.
- Died: September 30, 1970 (aged 54); South Gate, California, U.S.
- Batted: Right Threw: Right

MLB debut
- April 15, 1941, for the Chicago Cubs

Last MLB appearance
- June 10, 1946, for the Philadelphia Phillies

MLB statistics
- Batting average: .282
- Home runs: 15
- Runs batted in: 138
- Stats at Baseball Reference

Teams
- Chicago Cubs (1941–1944); Philadelphia Phillies (1946)

Louis Alexander Novikoff (October 12, 1915 – September 30, 1970), nicknamed "the Mad Russian", was an American professional baseball outfielder. He played in all or parts of five seasons in Major League Baseball (MLB) for the Chicago Cubs (1941–44) and Philadelphia Phillies (1946).

Novikoff played fastpitch softball before making his professional baseball debut in Minor League Baseball in 1937. The Cubs promoted him to the major leagues in 1941 but sent him back to the minor leagues for the 1945 season. After playing for the Phillies in 1946, he returned to the minor leagues until 1950, when he resumed playing softball. After his career, Novikoff was inducted into the International Softball Congress Hall of Fame and the Pacific Coast League Hall of Fame.

== Early life ==
Louis Alexander Novikoff was born in Glendale, Arizona, on October 12, 1915. His parents, Alexander and Julia, immigrated from Russia and were of Spiritual Christian Prygun descent. He was the seventh of fourteen children. The family moved to Boyle Heights, Los Angeles, in 1919. He and his siblings played semi-professional sports under the alias "Neva".

Alexander died in November 1928 after contracting pneumonia. Novikoff moved to Bakersfield, California, in 1932, and attended Kern County Union High School. His mother requested that he return home later that year and he completed his high school education at Theodore Roosevelt High School with many other descendants of Spiritual Christians from Russia.

== Career ==
=== Early career ===
Novikoff made his debut in fastpitch softball for a team in Torrance, California, in 1933. In 1935, Novikoff tried out with the Hollywood Stars of the Pacific Coast League (PCL) as an outfielder. He did not make the team. Novikoff joined the Huntington Beach Oilers, a softball team, in 1935, as a pitcher. Joe Rodgers, the player-manager of Huntington Beach, nicknamed Novikoff "the Mad Russian" to drum up fan interest.

Rodgers arranged for Novikoff to try out with the Los Angeles Angels of the PCL in 1937. The Angels, themselves a farm team of the Chicago Cubs of the National League, signed Novikoff and optioned him to the Ponca City Angels of the Class C Western Association. He batted .351 in 1937. In 1938, Novikoff played for the Moline Plowboys of the Class B Illinois-Indiana-Iowa League, and he led the league with a .367 batting average. He also led the league with 186 hits, 315 total bases, 23 triples, and 114 runs batted in (RBIs).

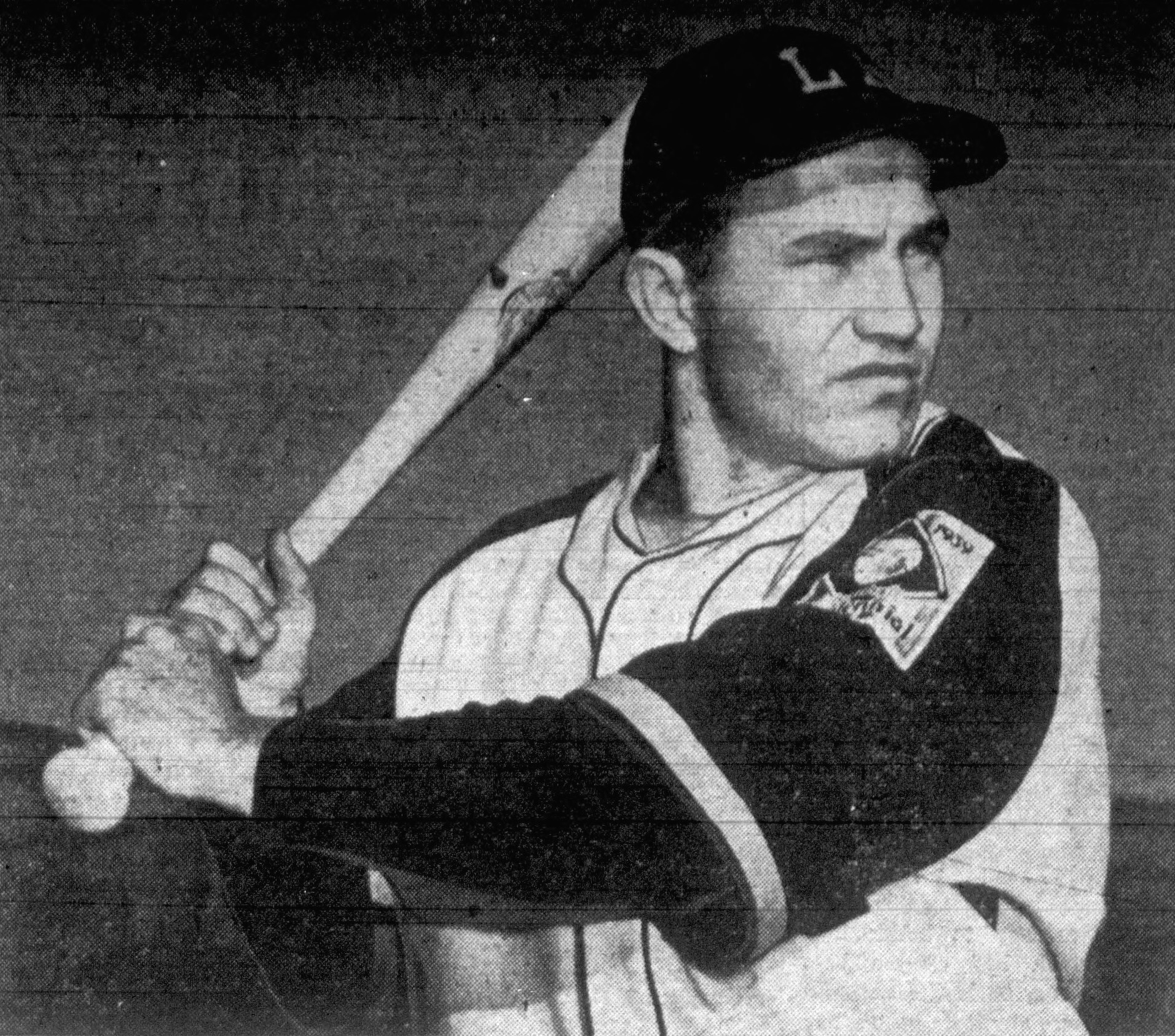
Novikoff with the Los Angeles Angels

In 1939, Novikoff began the season with the Angels, but was optioned to the Milwaukee Brewers of the Double-A American Association in April. He was recalled to the Angels in May, but then sent to the Tulsa Oilers of the Class A1 Texas League to fill in for an injured outfielder. Novikoff batted .368 in 110 games for Tulsa, winning the Texas League's batting championship over Nick Cullop, who batted .318. The Angels promoted him back to the PCL in August, and he batted .452 in 36 games at the end of the season. Novikoff won The Sporting News' Minor League Player of the Year Award in 1939. In 1940, playing for the Angels, Novikoff batted .363 with 41 home runs and 171 RBIs, leading the league in all three categories to win a triple crown. He finished in second place in voting for the PCL Most Valuable Player Award to George Archie.

=== Chicago Cubs ===
In August 1940, the Cubs paid the Angels a figure reportedly greater than $100,000 ($2,298,100 in current dollar terms) to acquire Novikoff, Lou Stringer, and Paul Erickson for the 1941 season. Novikoff made his MLB debut on Opening Day, April 15, 1941. He struggled and clashed with manager Jimmie Wilson, who used hand signals with the team that Novikoff did not understand. Novikoff was optioned to Milwaukee in June; Cubs coach Charlie Grimm was sent to Milwaukee with Novikoff to become Milwaukee's manager. He returned to the Cubs in September. With Milwaukee, Novikoff batted .370 in 90 games, winning another batting championship. In 62 games for the Cubs, Novikoff batted .241.

Novikoff struggled at the beginning of the 1942 season, and the Cubs reduced his playing time. Perceiving Novikoff to be too passive as a hitter, the Cubs began to pay him a bonus of $10 ($197 in current dollar terms) for every time that he struck out swinging. He batted .300 in 128 games for the Cubs in the 1942 season. Novikoff held out from the Cubs in 1943, missing the beginning of the season. The Cubs offered him a salary of $6,500 ($120,937 in current dollar terms) and he insisted on being paid $10,000 ($186,058 in current dollar terms). The two sides compromised and he signed with the Cubs in May, after missing the first 61 games of the 1943 season. He batted .279 in 78 games.

In 1944, Novikoff signed his contract with the Cubs without holding out, but he missed spring training in 1944 to be with his wife, who had an operation, and take care of their children. When he arrived, Novikoff pulled a muscle in his right leg and began the season on the disabled list. Relegated to a bench player, Novikoff played in 71 games, mostly as a pinch hitter.

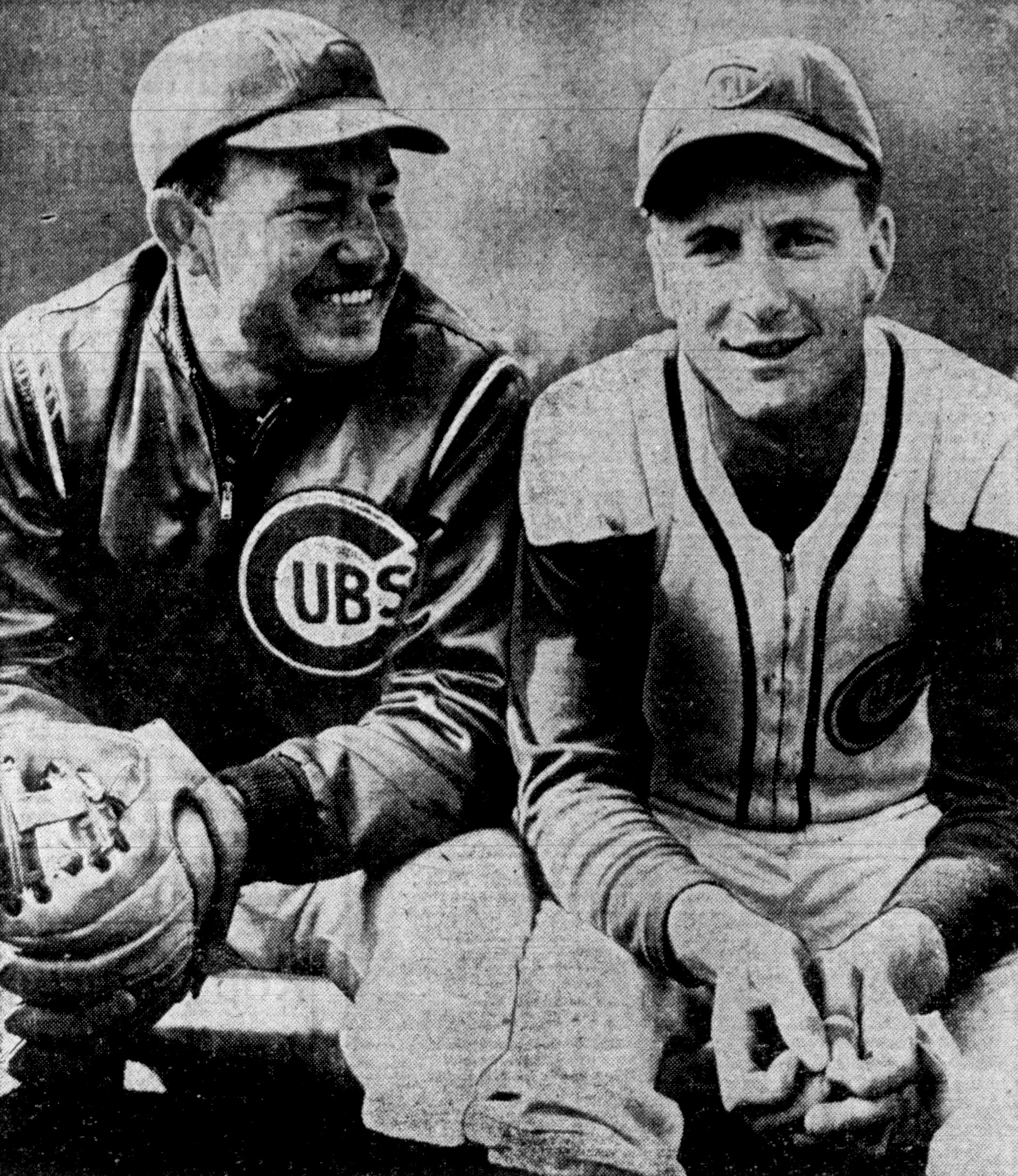
Novikoff (left) and Lou Stringer with the Chicago Cubs

Novikoff attributed his hitting struggles as a major leaguer to being over-coached. He said that the Cubs' instructions made him "forget how to hit the ball". He was also an unpredictable base runner; once, he tried to steal third base despite the Cubs having the bases loaded because he had gotten a good lead. Novikoff was also considered a poor fielder. He incorrectly perceived the foul lines at Wrigley Field to be crooked, and misplayed balls hit down the line as a result.

Additionally, Novikoff was afraid to approach the outfield wall, which at Wrigley Field is covered with ivy, stopping short of the wall and often allowing the ball to bounce off of it back to the infield. Grimm discovered that someone had told Novikoff that it was poison ivy as a practical joke, and took some of the leaves and rubbed them on his face and chewed them to demonstrate that they were safe. Novikoff asked him if the leaves could be smoked.

=== Later career ===
Before the 1945 season, Novikoff cleared waivers and the Cubs sent him to the Los Angeles Angels. He batted .310 in 101 games for the Angels. In July 1945, Novikoff was inducted into the United States Army at Fort MacArthur. He was assigned to the United States Army Air Corps at Sheppard Field in Wichita Falls, Texas. He played for Sheppard's baseball team and was discharged from the army on November 27.

After the 1945 season, the Philadelphia Phillies drafted Novikoff from the Angels. He batted .304 in 17 games, mostly as a pinch hitter, for the Phillies in the 1946 season as they gave more playing time to new acquisition Johnny Wyrostek and Del Ennis, who returned from military service. The Phillies sold Novikoff's contract to the Seattle Rainiers of the PCL in June. With Seattle, he batted .301 in 1946 and .325 in 1947.

In July 1948, Seattle sold Novikoff to the Newark Bears of the Triple-A International League. He batted .327 for Newark in 1948, and returned to the Bears in May 1949. The Houston Buffaloes of the Texas League purchased Novikoff from the Bears in July 1949. Houston released him after the season.

Novikoff went to training camp with the Angels in 1950 for a tryout. He did not make the team and returned to playing softball with Rodgers. Novikoff signed with the Yakima Bears of the Class B Western International League (WIL) in June, They sold him to the Victoria Athletics of the WIL in July.

Novikoff returned to playing softball for the Long Beach Nitehawks of the International Softball League in the 1950s. In 1965, the International Softball Congress (ISC) named Novikoff the first inductee of the ISC Hall of Fame. He was inducted into the PCL Hall of Fame in 2015. Emmett Ashford, the first African American umpire in the major leagues, credited Novikoff with helping him launch his career. Novikoff saw Ashford umpiring in women's softball and brought the president of his softball league to watch him umpire.

== Personal life ==
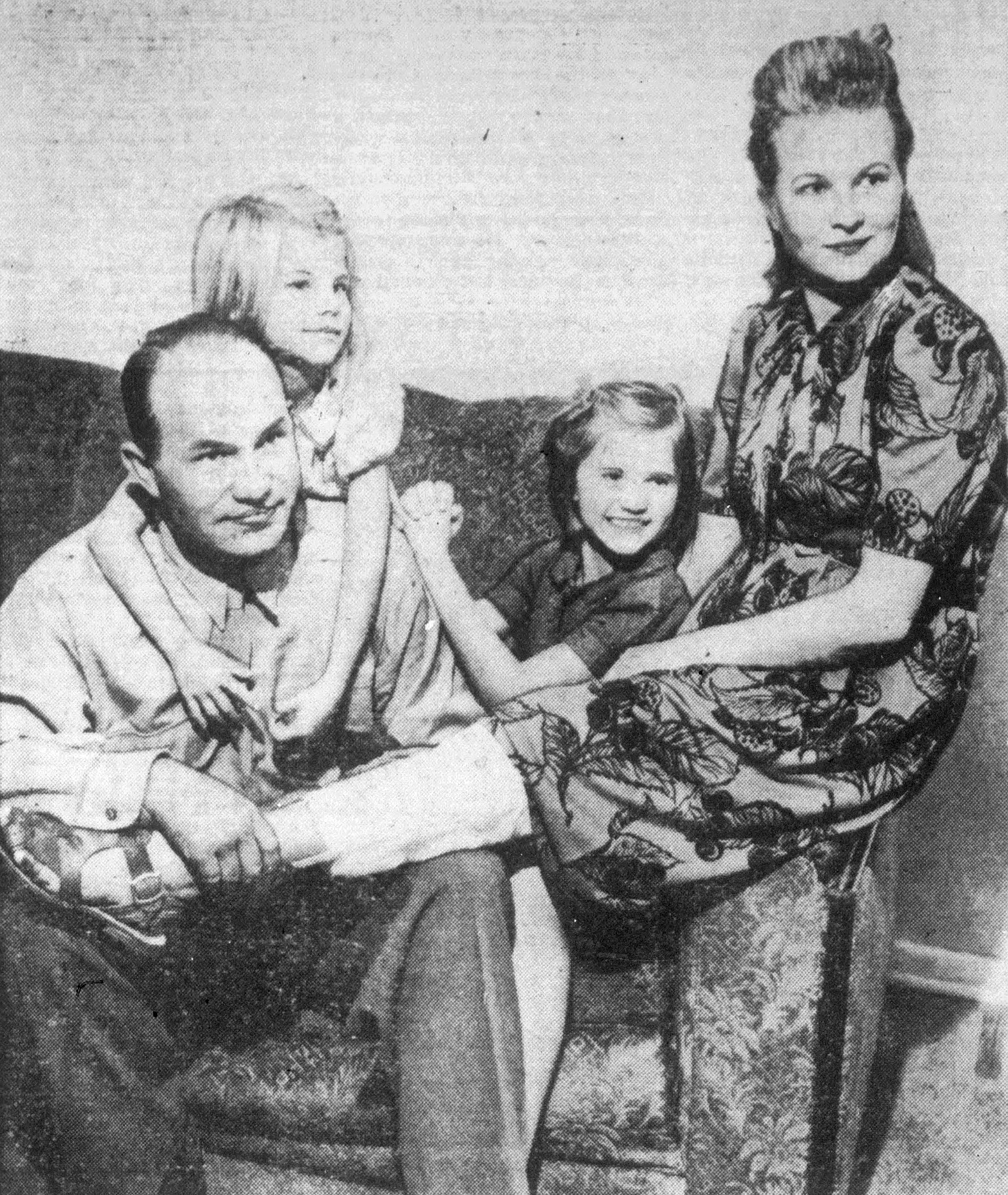
Novikoff, his wife, and his two daughters in 1945

On February 23, 1934, Novikoff married Esther Volkoff, who was also a child of Russian immigrants. They had three children; Marilyn June was born in November 1938, Anita Kay in September 1940, and Louis Neva was born March 1948. Novikoff had Esther sit behind home plate and heckle him when he batted to make him mad, which he believed helped him hit. Esther died from cancer in January 1970. On September 18, Novikoff married Tanya Kosaroff.

Novikoff's brother Tom played American football for the University of Oregon as a fullback and attended training camp with the San Francisco 49ers of the National Football League in 1953.

Novikoff enjoyed singing. He played the harmonica and was a crooner who sang as a baritone. He performed on the Kraft Music Hall with Bing Crosby and Jackie Cooper in March 1941 and on National Barn Dance in April 1941. He would often violate his team's curfew to sing in nightclubs.

Novikoff retired to South Gate, California, and worked for a motor freight company. He also worked as a longshoreman for the Pacific Maritime Association. He was stricken with emphysema in 1966, leaving him unable to work.

Novikoff died on September 30, 1970, of a heart attack, en route from his home in South Gate to a hospital. He was buried at the cemetery of Spiritual Christians from Russia Commerce, California, on October 3.
