= 1919 Vernon Tigers season =

1919 Vernon Tigers
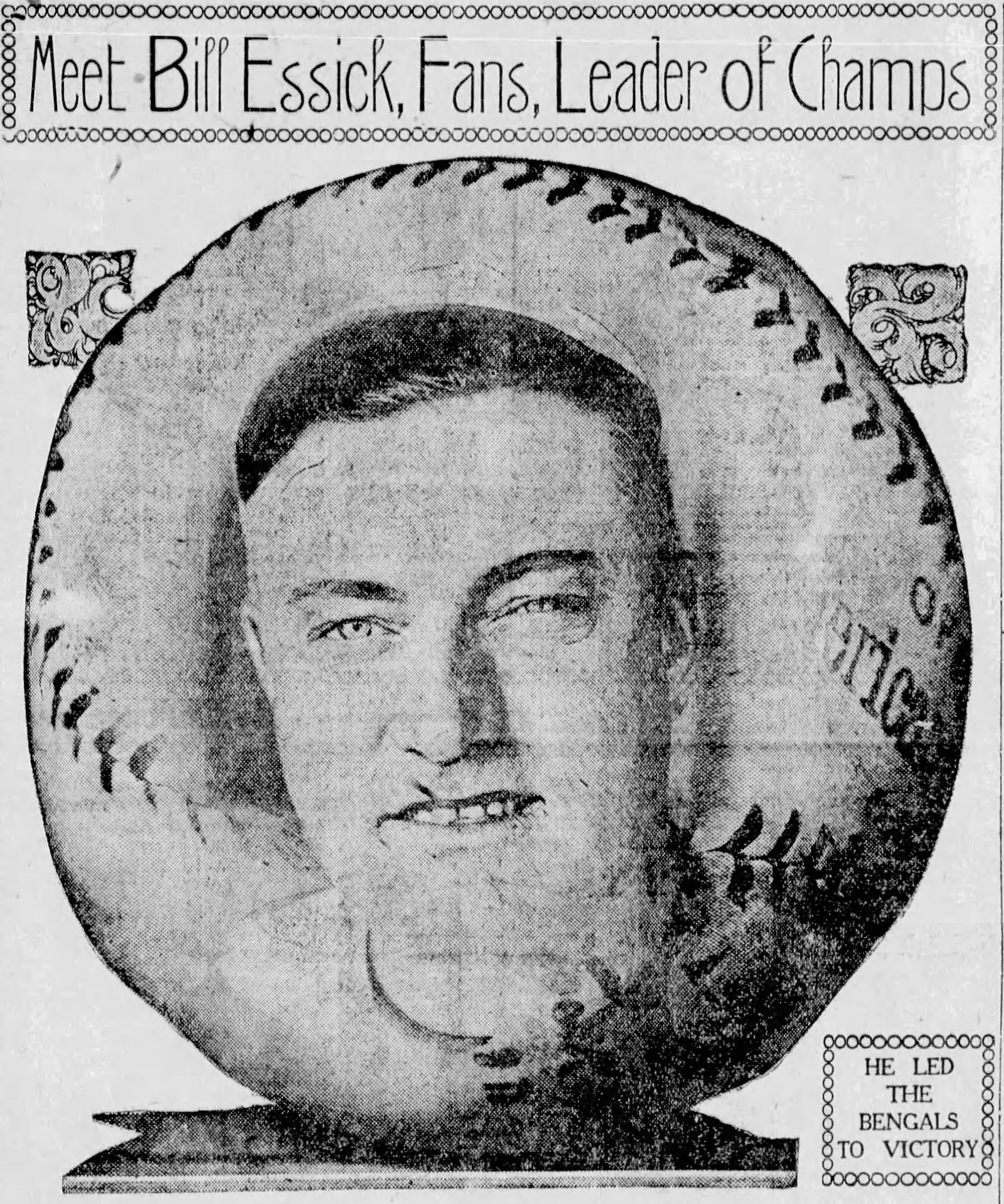
- Bill Essick, "Leader of Champs"
- League: Pacific Coast League
- Ballpark: Maier Park, Washington Park
- City: Vernon, California
- Record: 111–70
- League place: 1st
- Owners: Roscoe "Fatty" Arbuckle
- Managers: "Vinegar Bill" Essick

The 1919 Vernon Tigers season was the 11th season in the history of the Vernon Tigers baseball team. Playing in the Pacific Coast League (PCL), the team compiled a 111–70 record and won the PCL pennant. "Vinegar Bill" Essick was the team's manager from 1918 to 1925. Film star Roscoe "Fatty" Arbuckle was the team owner and president.

After the regular season ended, the Tigers defeated Mike Kelley's St. Paul Saints in a nine-game series at Washington Park in Los Angeles The series was billed as the "Little World Series" to determine the championship of western minor league baseball.

== Bribery scandal ==
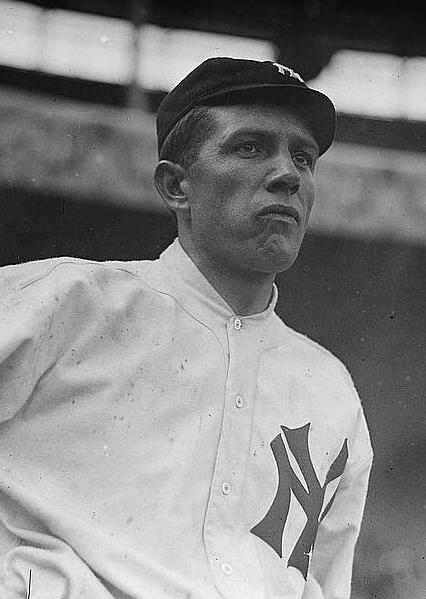
Babe Borton

The Tigers' championship was marred by revelations of a gambling scandal involving first baseman Babe Borton. Borton admitted paying money to three players on the Salt Lake City Bees to throw games against the Tigers. Borton claimed that bribes had also been paid by a teammate to Portland and Seattle players, that the bribes were paid out of a pool of money funded by numerous teammates, and that the bribes were instigated by Vernor manager Bill Essick. Borton was released by the Tigers in 1920 and never again played professional baseball. Other accounts indicated that a Seattle gambler was behind the bribery scheme.

== Position players ==
Third baseman/outfielder Bob Meusel led the Tigers with a .337 batting average, 221 hits, 38 doubles, 14 home runs, a .504 slugging percentage, and 330 total bases. His 221 hits ranked second in the PCL behind Sam Crawford. Meusel later played 10 seasons for the New York Yankees from 1920 to 1929.

Babe Borton compiled a .303 batting average with 15 doubles, 10 triples, and 14 home runs (tied with Meusel for third in the PCL).

Left fielder Hugh High, who played in the majors from 1913 to 1918, had a .317 average to finish second on the team behind Meusel.

Center fielder Chet Chadbourne, who played in the majors off-and-on from 1906 to 1918, ranked second on the team behind Meusel in hits (212), doubles (33), and total bases (269).

== Pitchers ==
Wheezer Dell, a native of Tuscarora, Nevada, led the team with 25 wins, 50 pitching appearances, and 351 innings pitched. Dell won 103 games for Vernon from 1919 to 1922 and was later inducted into the Pacific Coast League Hall of Fame.

Art Fromme, who played in the majors from 1906 to 1915, also pitched well for the 1919 Tigers, compiling a 20-7 record and leading the team with a 2.23 earned run average.

Byron Houck, who played in the majors off and on from 1912 to 1918, compiled a 19-16 record with a 3.88 earned run average.

Happy Finneran, who pitched in the majors from 1912 to 1918, compiled a 14-4 record (.778 winning percentage) with a 2.49 earned run average.

== 1919 PCL standings ==
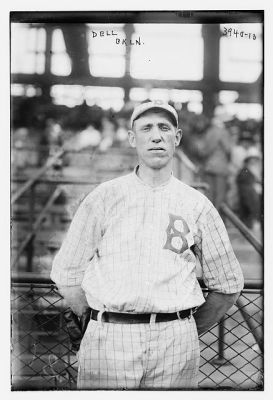
Vernon's pitching ace Wheezer Dell

Team	W	L	Pct.	GB
Vernon Tigers	111	70	.613	--
Los Angeles Angels	108	72	.600	2.5
Salt Lake City Bees	88	83	.515	18.0
Sacramento Senators	85	83	.506	19.5
Oakland Oaks	86	96	.473	25.5
San Francisco Seals	84	94	.472	25.5
Portland Beavers	78	96	.448	29.5
Seattle Purple Sox	62	108	.365	38.5

== Statistics ==
=== Batting ===
Note: Pos = Position; G = Games played; AB = At bats; H = Hits; Avg. = Batting average; HR = Home runs; SLG = Slugging percentage

Pos	Player	G	AB	H	Avg.	HR	SLG
3B, RF	Bob Meusel	163	655	221	.337	14	.500
LF	Hugh High	128	445	141	.317	0	.404
1B	Babe Borton	166	587	178	.303	14	.434
RF, 1B	Stump Edington	170	593	179	.302	1	.408
CF	Chet Chadbourne	182	721	212	.294	2	.373
2B	Bob Fisher	147	563	163	.290	2	.364
SS	Johnny Mitchell	182	720	204	.283	0	.329
P	Wheezer Dell	50	128	29	.227	1	.305
C	Al DeVormer	103	328	70	.213	2	.262
3B	Zinn Beck	97	312	66	.212	0	.262

=== Pitching ===
Note: G = Games pitched; IP = Innings pitched; W = Wins; L = Losses; PCT = Win percentage; ERA = Earned run average; SO = Strikeouts

Player	G	IP	W	L	PCT	ERA	SO
Wheezer Dell	50	351.0	25	16	.610	2.38	
Art Fromme	45	250.0	20	7	.741	2.23	
Byron Houck	45	278.0	19	16	.543	3.88	
Rex Dawson	39	231.0	16	11	.593	2.96	
Happy Finneran	28	195.0	14	4	.778	2.49	
Willie Mitchell	26	155.0	9	5	.643	2.61	
