= Fuzzy Hufft =

American professional baseball outfielder

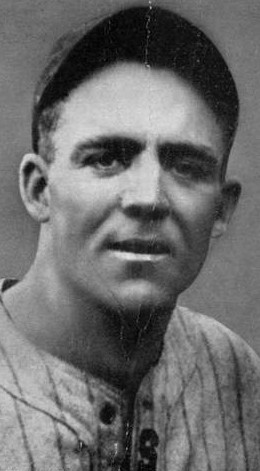
- Outfielder
- Born: August 2, 1901; Lebanon, Missouri, U.S.
- Died: October 28, 1973 (aged 72); Houston, Texas, U.S.
- Batted: Left Threw: Right

Member of the Pacific Coast League

Baseball Hall of Fame
- Induction: 2007

Irvin Victor "Fuzzy" Hufft (August 2, 1901 – October 28, 1973) was an American professional baseball outfielder. He played in the Pacific Coast League for the Seattle Indians, Mission Reds, and Oakland Oaks from 1926 to 1932. He is a member of the PCL Hall of Fame.

== Career ==
Hufft began playing baseball as a semi-professional in Springfield, Missouri. He signed with the Springfield Midgets of the Class C Western Association late in the 1923 season due to an injury to Runt Marr and made his professional debut as a third baseman. He returned to Springfield for the 1924 season, but new manager Boss Schmidt decided to play Hufft as an outfielder. He hit well for the Midgets, but was released in May because of his poor fielding. Hufft played for the Arkansas City Osages of the Class D Southwestern League for the remainder of the 1924 season. He began the 1925 season with Arkansas City, but in August, he was suspended by the club for the remainder of the season due to a run-in with team officials. The team subsequently sold Hufft to the Wichita Izzies of the Class A Western League.

Hufft was sold to the Seattle Indians of the Pacific Coast League (PCL) for the 1926 season. With his strong play at the beginning of the season, Seattle made him the starting right fielder, relegating Brick Eldred to being a bench player. He finished the 1926 season with a .311 batting average and 16 home runs in 165 games.

During the 1928 season, the Indians traded Hufft to the Mission Reds for Eddie Bryan. For Seattle and Mission, he batted .371 for the 1928 season and hit 29 home runs, the third-most in the league. Hufft batted .356 in the 1930 season. During the 1931 season, he was benched by the Missions, and then sold to the Oakland Oaks for $5,000 ($105,853 in current dollar terms). He had a .343 batting average for the 1931 season. The Oaks sold Hufft to the Indianapolis Indians of the American Association in August 1932. The Indians released Hufft in April 1933. He signed with the Oklahoma City Indians of the Class A Texas League in May 1933, but was released a week later. He then caught on with the Galveston Buccaneers of the Texas League for the remainder of the 1933 season.

During the 1933–34 offseason, Hufft suffered a compound fracture of his left leg between his ankle and knee in an automobile collision, and doctors feared that they might need to amputate. Though his leg was saved, he was unable to play in 1934. The Buccaneers hosted a benefit game for Hufft in March 1934 that raised $275 ($6,618 in current dollar terms) for him. Out of organized baseball, Hufft managed a semi-professional team in Galveston in 1935.

In the PCL, Hufft recorded 1,446 hits with a .346 batting average, 166 home runs, and 902 runs batted in. He was inducted into the PCL Hall of Fame in 2007.

== Personal life ==
Hufft received his nickname from a Sunday school teacher, who referred to his unkempt hair as "fuzzy".

After the 1925 season, Hufft was arrested for stealing two cases of cigarettes. He was convicted of grand larceny and sentenced to two years in prison. However, he was granted parole in December.

Hufft married Jean Hainsworth in December 1928.
