= Ted Norbert =

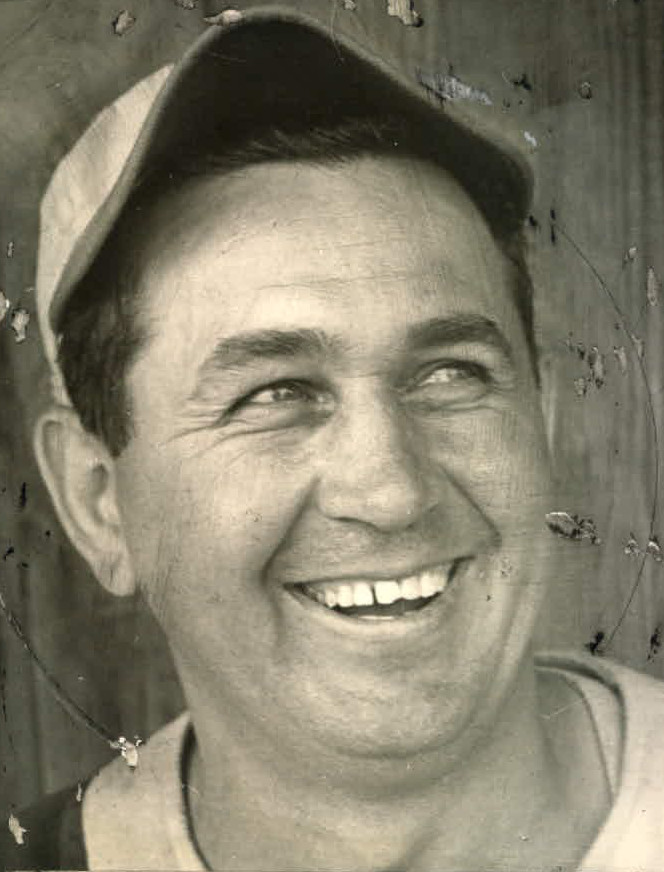
- Outfielder
- Born: May 17, 1908; Brooklyn, New York, U.S.
- Died: August 19, 1991 (aged 83); San Juan, Puerto Rico
- Batted: Right Threw: Right

BRL debut
- 1930, for the Chambersburg Young Yanks

Last WIL appearance
- 1948, for the Victoria Athletics

MiLB statistics
- Batting average: .305
- Home runs: 78
- Hits: 2,491

Teams
- As player: Chambersburg Young Yanks (BRL, 1930); Scranton Miners (NYPL, 1931); Springfield Rifles (Eastern League, 1932); Binghamton Triplets (NYPL, 1932–34); St. Paul Saints (AA, 1934); Syracuse Chiefs (IL, 1934); Albany Senators (IL, 1934); Baltimore Orioles (1934); Newark Bears (IL, 1934); San Francisco Seals (PCL, 1935–40); Portland Beavers (PCL, 1941–43); Senadores de San Juan (LBPPR, 1941–42); Milwaukee Brewers (AA, 1943); Los Angeles Angels (PCL, 1944); Seattle Rainiers (PCL, 1945–46); Victoria Athletics (1946–48); As manager: Victoria Athletics (1947–49)

Theodore Joseph Norbert (May 17, 1908 - August 19, 1991) was an American long-time minor league baseball player who is now in the Pacific Coast League Hall of Fame.

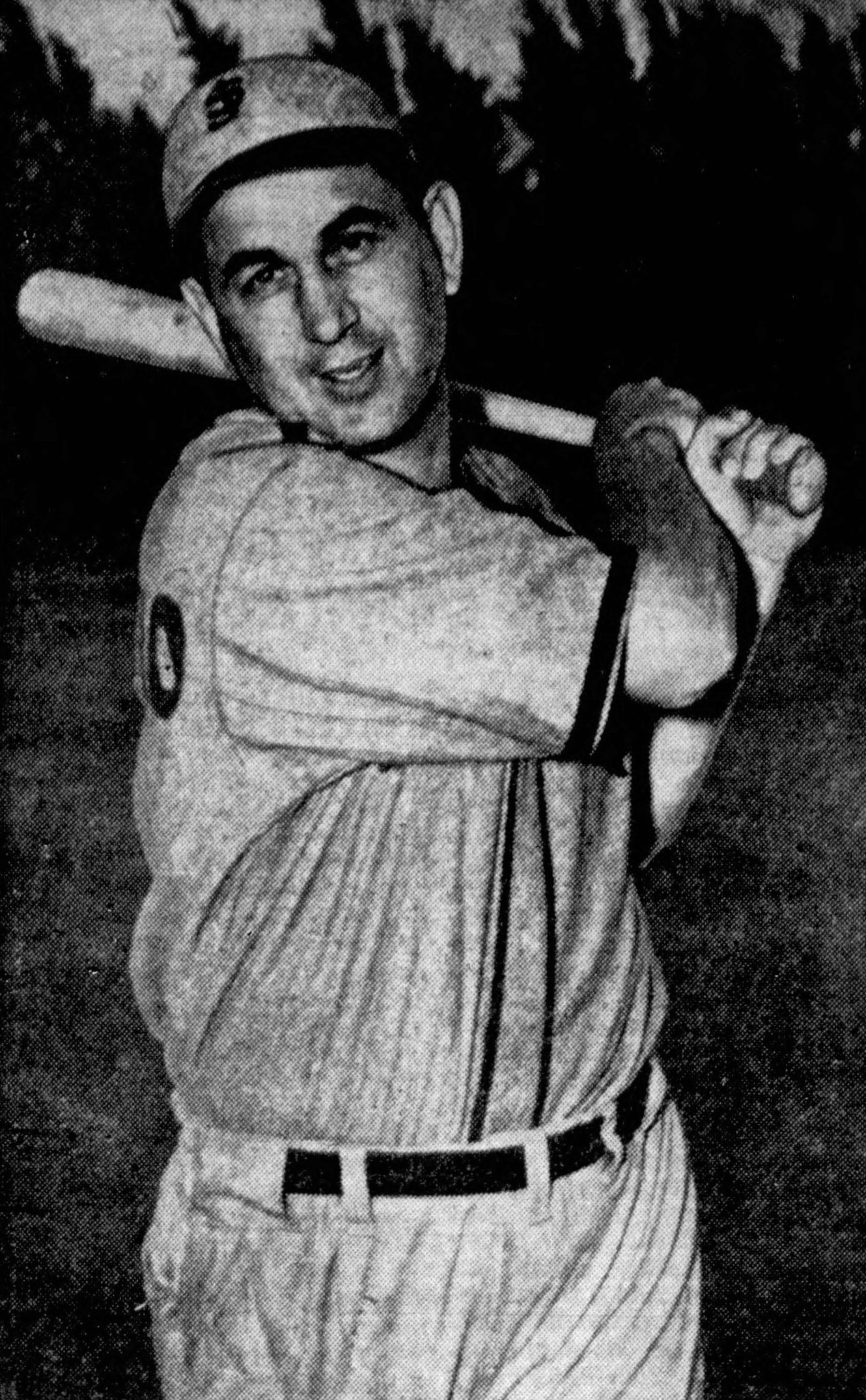
Norbet during his tenure with the Senadores de San Juan of the Liga de Béisbol Profesional de Puerto Rico during the 1941–42 season.

Norbert played 19 seasons in the minor leagues from 1930 to 1948, hitting .306 with 2,491 hits, 493 doubles and 313 home runs. He eclipsed the 20 home run mark in a season ten times, the 25 homer mark five times and the 30 mark once. He hit as many as 46 doubles (which he did three times) and 13 triples in a season, and he had career highs of 192 hits and 677 at-bats. He played in the Pacific Coast League every year from 1935 to 1945, except for 1943.

Teams he played for included the San Francisco Seals (1935–40), Portland Beavers (1941–42), Los Angeles Angels (1944), and Seattle Rainiers (1945–46). He led the PCL in home runs in four different seasons: 1938, 1941, 1942 and 1945. In addition to his PCL home run title in 1942, Norbert captured the league's batting title that season as well. He won a PCL Championship in 1935 as a member of the San Francisco Seals. Norbert was one of four players, and cash, traded to the San Francisco Seals by the New York Yankees in late 1934 for Joe DiMaggio

Norbet played for the Senadores de San Juan of the Liga de Béisbol Profesional de Puerto Rico during the 1941–42 season.

Norbert managed the Victoria Athletics from 1947 to 1949, being replaced by Earl Bolyard partway through the 1949 season.
