= Joe Brovia =

American baseball player (1922-1994)

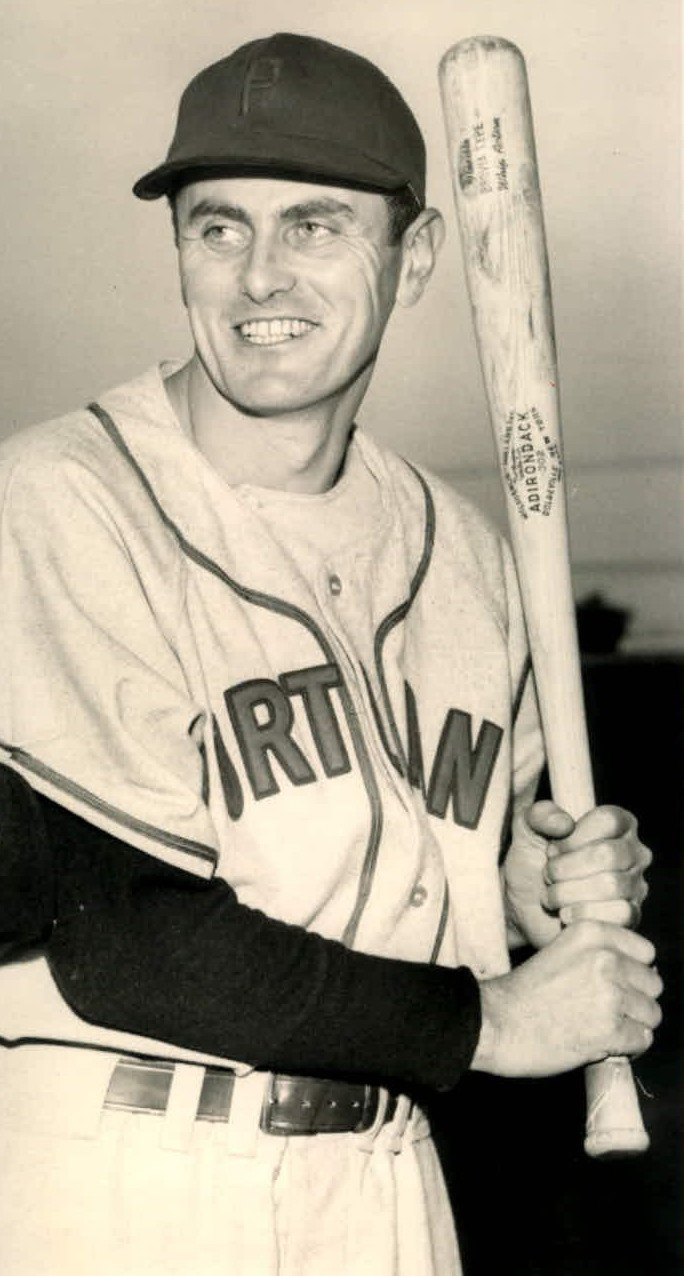
- Brovia as a member of the Portland Beavers
- Pinch hitter
- Born: February 18, 1922; Davenport, California, U.S.
- Died: August 15, 1994 (aged 72); Santa Cruz, California, U.S.
- Batted: Left Threw: Right

MLB debut
- July 3, 1955, for the Cincinnati Redlegs

Last MLB appearance
- August 5, 1955, for the Cincinnati Redlegs

MLB statistics
- Batting average: .111
- Home runs: 0
- Runs batted in: 4
- Stats at Baseball Reference

Teams
- Cincinnati Redlegs (1955)

Joseph John Brovia (February 18, 1922 – August 15, 1994) was an American professional baseball player. An outfielder, Brovia played almost 1,800 games over 15 seasons in minor league baseball but only 21 games as a pinch hitter at the Major League level with the 1955 Cincinnati Redlegs. The native of Davenport, California, threw right-handed, batted left-handed, and was listed at 6 feet 3 inches (1.91 m) tall and 195 pounds (88 kg).

He graduated from Santa Cruz High School in 1940.

Brovia was a longtime star outfielder in the Pacific Coast League with the San Francisco Seals, Portland Beavers, Sacramento Solons, and the Oakland Oaks from 1941–42 and from 1946–55. He served in the United States Army during World War II and missed the 1943–45 seasons.

Known best for his batting, Brovia had a lifetime .311 average in 1,805 minor league games (.304 lifetime in the PCL) producing 1,846 hits, 1,144 RBIs and 214 home runs. As a prolific hitter, Brovia was popular with the fans, especially for his home runs over the four-story high fence at Seals Stadium, called the "Green Monster" of the Coast League.

He had a short stint at age 33 with the 1955 Redlegs, but only batted as a pinch hitter. In 21 games and plate appearances, he collected two singles and one base on balls, and drove in four runs.

After his shot with the Redlegs, he played the next season in Mexico, after which he retired.

Brovia died from cancer in Santa Cruz, California. He was inducted posthumously into the Pacific Coast League Hall of Fame in 2005.
