= Happy Hogan (baseball) =

American baseball player (1877–1915)

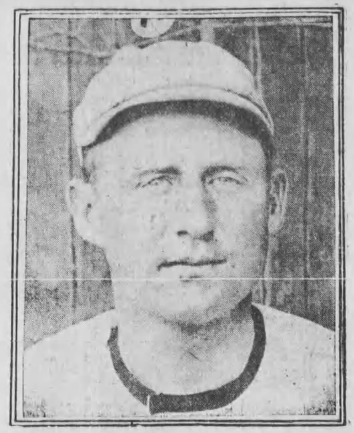
- Catcher
- Born: Wallace Louis Bray; October 13, 1877; Santa Clara, California, U.S.
- Died: May 17, 1915 (aged 37); Los Angeles, California, U.S.
- Batted: Right Threw: Right

Wallace Louis Bray (known professionally as Happy Hogan; October 13, 1877 – May 17, 1915) was an American minor league baseball catcher and manager in the early 20th century. He is a member of the Pacific Coast League Hall of Fame.

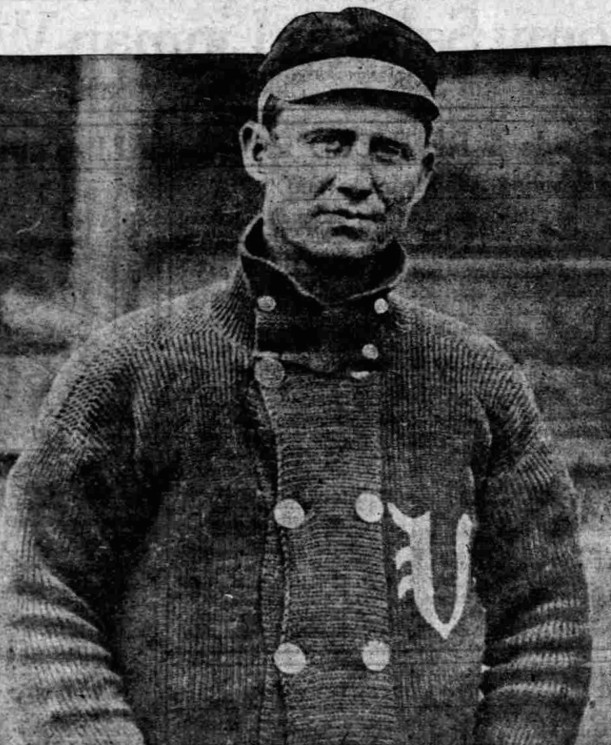
Hogan as the manager for the Vernon Tigers in 1911.

Hogan was born on October 13, 1877, in Santa Clara, California. He played at Santa Clara College and then the University of Southern California (USC), captaining the USC Trojans to a championship. He first played professionally in 1901 in the 1899–1902 iteration of the California League. His team, the Sacramento Solons, moved to the Pacific Coast League (PCL) as a founding member in 1903, and Hogan remained in the PCL for the rest of his career. He played through the 1914 season, serving as a player-manager 1909–1914.

Hogan changed his last name, at least for baseball purposes, from Bray to hide his participation in the then–somewhat–déclassé profession of baseball from his father. Although Hogan was a poor hitter (his lifetime batting average is .180 and slugging average is .217), he was a good catcher. He was described as having a scrappy larger-than-life personality and was a well-known figure in the beginning days of the PCL, was the longest-serving player from the PCL's founding year (1903–1914), and managed the Vernon/Venice Tigers (1909–1915), dying during the 1915 season.

After Hogan took over the manager's chair of the Vernon Tigers in 1909, newspapers sometimes called the team "Hogan's Tigers". As a manager, Hogan was an advocate of the controversial innovation of uniform numbers.

Hogan contracted pneumonia and died on May 17, 1915, in Los Angeles at age 37.
