= Brick Eldred =

American baseball player (1892–1976)

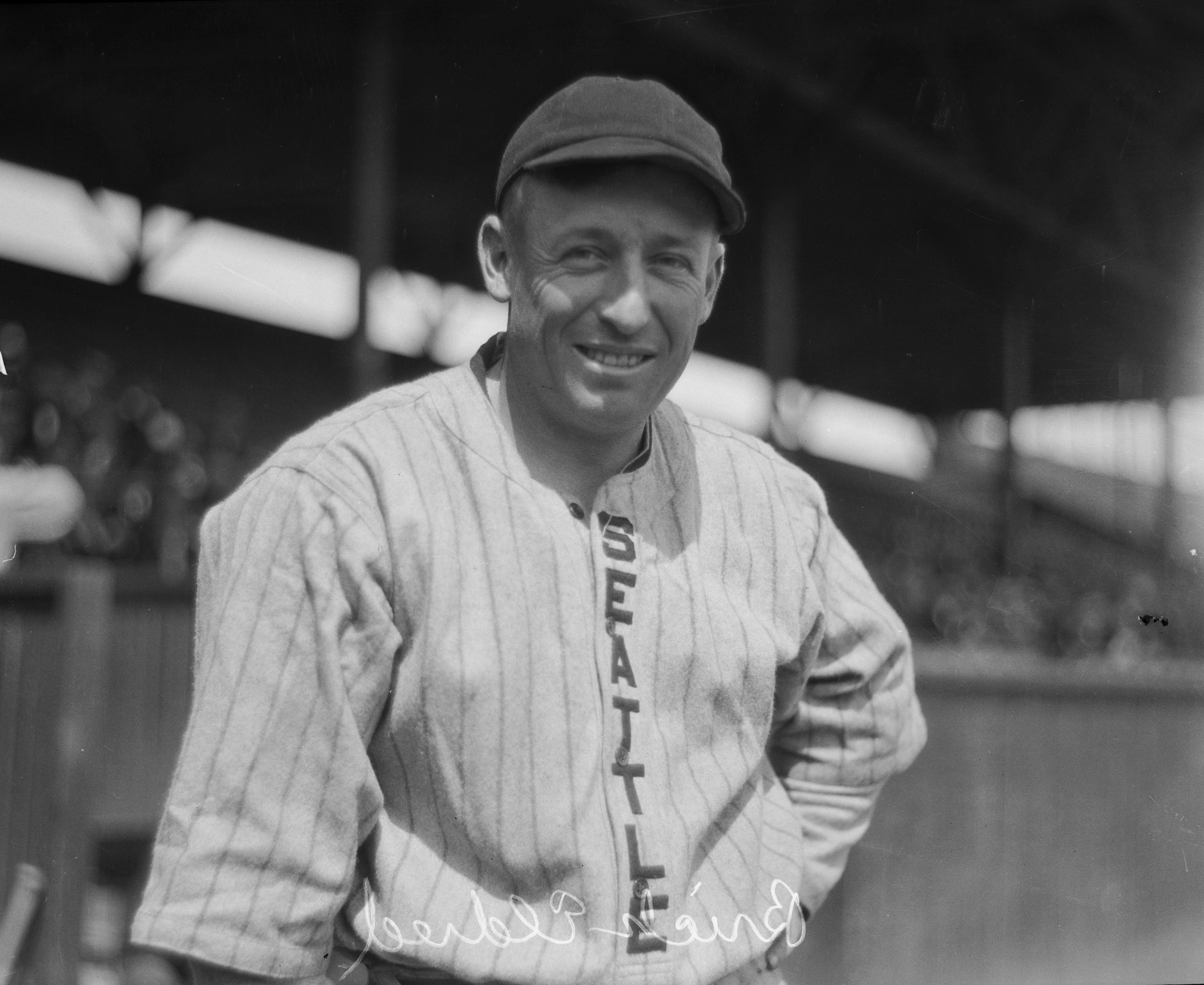
- Brick in Seattle, 1920s
- Outfielder
- Born: July 26, 1892; Sacramento, California, U.S.
- Died: December 22, 1976 (aged 84); Sacramento, California, U.S.
- Batted: Right Threw: Right

Teams
- Salt Lake City Bees (1916); Sacramento Senators (1918–1920); Seattle Indians (1920–1928); Sacramento Senators (1930)

Member of the Pacific Coast League

Baseball Hall of Fame
- Induction: 2003

Ross C. "Brick" Eldred (July 26, 1892 – December 22, 1976) was an American professional baseball outfielder. He played for the Salt Lake City Bees, the Sacramento Senators, and the Seattle Indians of the Pacific Coast League (PCL) from 1916 to 1930. He is a member of the PCL Hall of Fame.

== Early life and career ==
Eldred was born in Sacramento, California, on July 26, 1892. He graduated from Sacramento High School in 1910. When he was fully grown, Eldred stood 5 feet 6 inches (1.68 m) tall and weighed approximately 180 pounds (82 kg), earning him the nickname "Brick".

== Professional career ==
=== Early career ===
After playing semi-professional baseball, Eldred signed with the Salt Lake City Bees of the Pacific Coast League (PCL) after the 1915 season. He made the team for the 1916 season as a utility player. With Salt Lake City unable to get Eldred playing time, they traded him to the Seattle Giants of the Northwestern League in June. Eldred had a .332 batting average for Seattle in 1932.

The Giants sold Eldred to the Chicago White Sox of the American League. In 1917, Eldred reported to spring training with the White Sox and competed to become the starting right fielder against Nemo Leibold, Eddie Murphy, Jack Fournier, and Shano Collins. The White Sox optioned Eldred to the Newark Bears of the International League. However, Danny Shay, the manager of the Milwaukee Brewers of the American Association, claimed that he had bought Eldred from Seattle, and appealed to the National Baseball Commission. The Commission awarded Eldred to Newark. He batted .269 with Newark during the 1917 season, and the White Sox recalled him in August. He did not play for the White Sox, and Eldred got into a salary dispute with the team after they declined to pay him for the final month of the season. Eldred petitioned Garry Herrmann, the head of the National Commission, to gain his release from the White Sox organization.

=== Sacramento and Seattle ===
The Sacramento Senators of the PCL purchased Eldred from the White Sox for $750 ($15,679 in current dollar terms) before the 1918 season. He batted .264 for Sacramento in 1918 and batted .311 in 1919. In May 1920, Bill Rodgers, the manager of the Senators, fined Eldred $25 ($390 in current dollar terms) for using disrespectful language towards him and another $25 for not hustling on the field. Eldred refused to play in the next game and Rodgers suspended him indefinitely. Rodgers also accused Eldred of being out of shape. A few days later, the Senators sold Eldred to the Seattle Indians of the PCL for $3,500 ($54,936 in current dollar terms). The Indians also raised Eldred's salary and paid the $50 fine.

Eldred recorded over 200 hits in five seasons between 1920 and 1925. He had 231 hits in 1920 and batted .339, the third-best average in the PCL. His average dropped to .319 in 1921, and the team cut his salary by $75 per month ($1,322 in current dollar terms). Eldred batted .354 in 1922, the third-best in the league, with 260 hits. He batted .353 with 262 hits during the 1923 season. In 1924, Eldred batted .351 with 240 hits and led the league with 71 doubles. He had 242 hits for the 1925 season.

=== Later career ===
The Indians acquired Fuzzy Hufft in 1926, which led to a reduction in Eldred's playing time. Eldred had been the cleanup hitter for Seattle, but they moved him out of the role in 1926, replacing him with Monk Sherlock. He batted .340 in 1926 and .325 in 1927. Eldred returned to Seattle for the 1928 season as a bench player. At the end of April, Seattle sold him to the Wichita Falls Spudders of the Class A Texas League for $5,000 ($91,560 in current dollar terms) after he had cleared waivers in the PCL. He batted .356 in 91 games for Wichita Falls in 1928.

Eldred became a bench player for Wichita Falls in 1929. He was sold to the Milwaukee Brewers of the Class AA American Association in July following the acquisition of Larry Bettencourt. Milwaukee released Eldred before the 1930 season. In May 1930, the Senators released Wally Hood and signed Eldred. In 79 games, Eldred batted .369. The Senators released Eldred before the 1931 season.

In his career, Eldred played in 1,709 PCL games, finishing with a .332 batting average, 2,034 hits, 516 doubles, and 219 stolen bases.

== Personal life ==
Eldred and his wife, Myrtle, married in 1914. They had a son, Richard. After he retired from baseball, he worked for the California Almond Growers Exchange.

Eldred died in Sacramento on December 22, 1976. He was inducted into the PCL Hall of Fame in 2003.
