= Marv Gudat =

American baseball player (1903–1954)

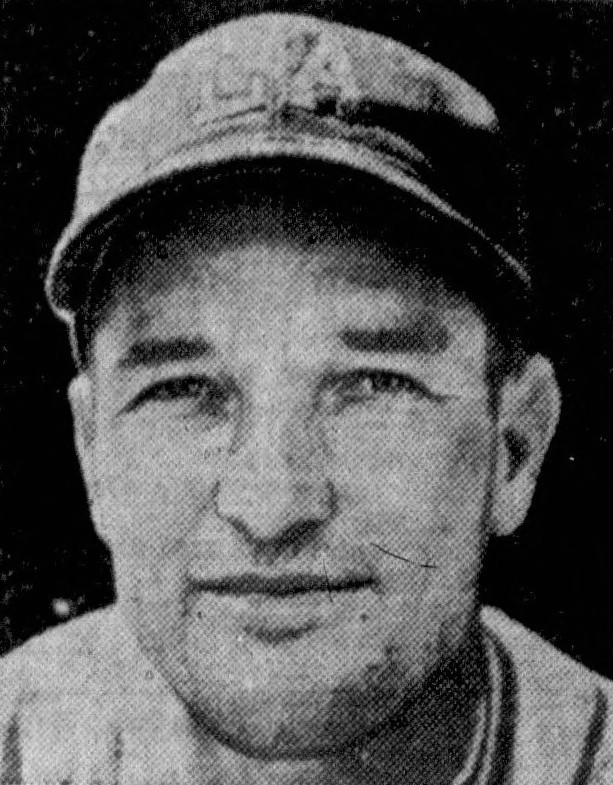
- Outfielder
- Born: August 27, 1903; Goliad, Texas, U.S.
- Died: March 1, 1954 (aged 50); Los Angeles, California, U.S.
- Batted: Left Threw: Left

MLB debut
- May 21, 1929, for the Cincinnati Reds

Last MLB appearance
- September 25, 1932, for the Chicago Cubs

MLB statistics
- Batting average: .250
- Home runs: 1
- Runs batted in: 15
- Stats at Baseball Reference

Teams
- Cincinnati Reds (1929); Chicago Cubs (1932)

Marvin John Gudat (August 27, 1903 – March 1, 1954) was an American Major League Baseball outfielder for the Cincinnati Reds and Chicago Cubs. He attended UCLA. Gudat was inducted in the Pacific Coast League Hall of Fame in 2018.
