= Emmett Ashford =

American baseball umpire (1914–1980)

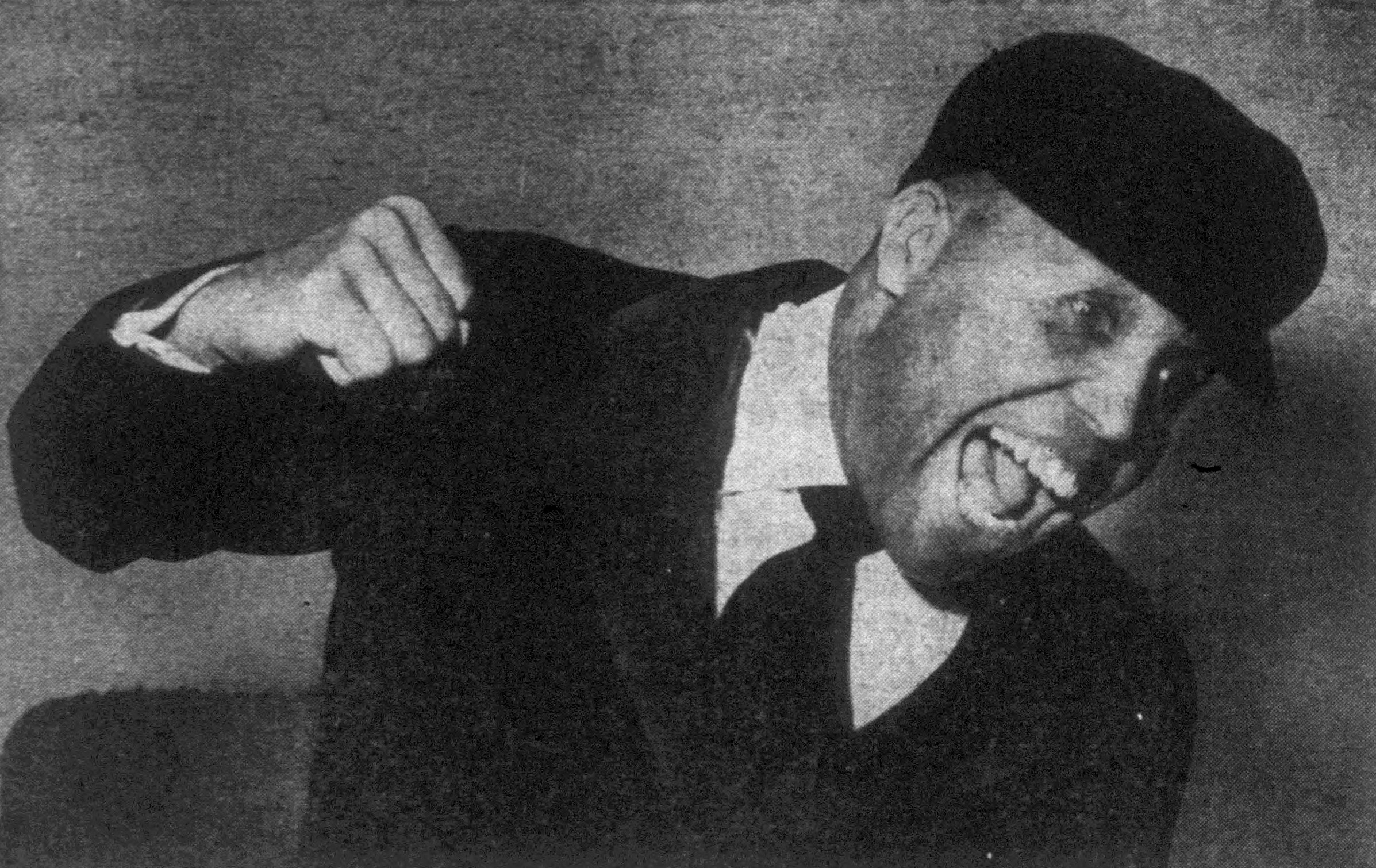
- Ashford, circa 1953
- Umpire
- Born: November 23, 1914; Los Angeles, California, U.S.
- Died: March 1, 1980 (aged 65); Marina del Rey, California, U.S.

MLB debut
- April 11, 1966

Last MLB appearance
- October 15, 1970

Career highlights and awards
- First African–American Umpire in MLB; Special Assignments: All-Star Game (1967); World Series (1970)
Military career
Allegiance	United States
Branch	United States Navy
Service years	1943–1946
Conflicts	World War II

Emmett Littleton Ashford (November 23, 1914 – March 1, 1980), nicknamed Ash, was an umpire in Major League Baseball (MLB), working in the American League from 1966 to 1970. He was MLB's first African American umpire.

== Early life ==
Ashford was born in Los Angeles, California. His father, Littleton, was a policeman, but abandoned the family, leaving Ashford's mother Adele to raise Emmett and his brother Wilbur. Ashford earned money selling Liberty magazine, and as a cashier in a supermarket. Ashford attended Jefferson High School, and was co-editor of the school paper, played baseball and track, and was the senior class president.

Ashford attended Los Angeles Junior College. He graduated from Chapman University in 1941.

In about 1936, Ashford took a job as a post office clerk, a position he held for 15 years. In the late 1930s, Ashford briefly attempted to play semi-professional baseball, but turned to umpiring when he was asked to fill in for an umpire who did not show up to a game.

Ashford served in the Navy during World War II, and was inspired to become the first black major league umpire while stationed in Corpus Christi, Texas, when an announcement came on the radio that Jackie Robinson had broken baseball's color barrier.

== Early career ==
In 1951, Ashford took a leave of absence from his Santa Ana, California post office job, where he moonlighted as a Santa Ana municipal league softball and National Night Ball League of Southern California umpire. His colorful style included a personal trademark: when a batter received a base-on-balls, instead of simply calling "Ball Four," Ashford would grandly intone, "Ball Fo-uh, you may proceed to first base." He left Santa Ana to umpire in the Southwestern International League, becoming the first black umpire in the traditionally white professional baseball system. When he was offered a full-season umpiring job, Ashford resigned from the postal service.

After the Southwestern International League folded mid-season, Ashford joined the Arizona–Texas League. He moved on to the Western International League in 1953, and was promoted to the Pacific Coast League (PCL) in 1954. He worked with Cece Carlucci as his crew chief for 922 games.

Ashford spent 12 years in the PCL, and became known for his exuberance, showmanship and energy, even interacting with the crowd between innings. During the off-seasons, Ashford refereed Pac-8 basketball games and college football. He also umpired in the Caribbean winter leagues, and ran several umpiring clinics. In 1963, Ashford was named the PCL's umpire-in-chief, making him responsible for training crews and advising the league on disputed games or rules.

== Major league career ==
By the early 1960s, many West Coast sportswriters began to suggest that Ashford be promoted to the major leagues. In September 1965, Ashford's contract was sold to the American League. Ashford made his debut at D.C. Stadium on April 11, 1966. He quickly became a sensation, becoming known for sprinting around the infield after foul balls or plays on the bases. Ashford also brought a new style to being an umpire. He wore jewelry, including flashy cuff links, and wore polished shoes and freshly-pressed suits. While some observers believed that his race prevented him from working in the majors earlier than he did, others maintained that his flashy style actually delayed his major league debut due to general disdain for umpires to draw attention to themselves. The Sporting News stated that "For the first time in the history of the grand old American game, baseball fans may buy a ticket to watch an umpire perform."

Ashford was the left field umpire in the 1967 All-Star Game, and worked all five games of the 1970 World Series, but did not work home plate.

Ashford was one of the only umpires fiery Baltimore Orioles manager Earl Weaver was ever nice to during a game. During a doubleheader against Washington on April 13, 1969, Ashford ruled that a ball hit by Ken McMullen had landed fair in left field, when in actuality Don Buford had caught it just before it hit the ground. Weaver went up to Ashford and politely asked him, "Can you change your call? Just ask the other umpires, because I understand you couldn't see it where you were running from." The other umpires all said Buford had made the catch, so Ashford reversed the call.

Ashford reached the American League's retirement age of 55 in December 1969 but still umpired one additional season in 1970 before retiring.

== Post-umpiring career and death ==
In 1971, Ashford was hired by Bowie Kuhn as a public relations adviser, a role in which Ashford spoke and held clinics on the west coast, and as far away as Korea. He also served as umpire-in-chief for the Alaskan summer league for three years. He appeared in television commercials, playing a cashier in an ad for A&P Grocery stores. Ashford also appeared as an umpire in the 1976 film The Bingo Long Traveling All-Stars & Motor Kings, and in episodes of Ironside, The Jacksons, and What's My Line?, in which Ashford appeared in his first major league season. Ashford was also a contestant on November 17, 1955, TV edition of You Bet Your Life.

Ashford is the subject of the documentary film Called Up: The Emmett Ashford Story.

Ashford died of a heart attack at age 65 in Marina del Rey, California. Upon his death, Bowie Kuhn issued a statement, saying, "As the first black umpire in the major leagues, his magnanimous nature was sternly tested, but he was unshaken and uncomplaining, remaining the colorful, lively personality he was all his life." At his funeral, Ashford was eulogized by Kuhn and former USC baseball coach Rod Dedeaux. Ashford was cremated, and his ashes were interred in Cooperstown, New York.

== See also ==
- List of Major League Baseball umpires (disambiguation)
