= Wheezer Dell =

American baseball player (1886–1966)

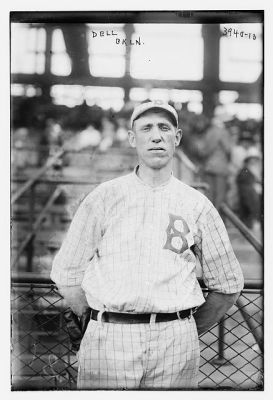
- Pitcher
- Born: June 11, 1886; Tuscarora, Nevada, U.S.
- Died: August 24, 1966 (aged 80); Lone Pine, California, U.S.
- Batted: Right Threw: Right

MLB debut
- April 22, 1912, for the St. Louis Cardinals

Last MLB appearance
- July 4, 1917, for the Brooklyn Robins

MLB statistics
- Win–loss record: 19–23
- Earned run average: 2.55
- Strikeouts: 198
- Stats at Baseball Reference

Teams
- St. Louis Cardinals (1912); Brooklyn Robins (1915–1917)

William George "Wheezer" Dell (June 11, 1886 – August 24, 1966) was an American Major League Baseball pitcher in 1912 and 1915–1917. Dell pitched for the St. Louis Cardinals and Brooklyn Robins. He was the first Nevada-born player in major league history.

For his long career in the minor leagues, which included 230 victories over 13 seasons, Dell is a member of the Pacific Coast League Hall of Fame.

Preceded by Larry Cheney	Brooklyn Robins Opening Day starting pitcher 1917	Succeeded by Rube Marquard
