= Truck Eagan =

American baseball player (1877–1949)

- Infielder
- Born: August 10, 1877; San Francisco, California, U.S.
- Died: March 19, 1949 (aged 71); San Francisco, California, U.S.
- Batted: Right Threw: Right

MLB debut
- May 1, 1901, for the Pittsburgh Pirates

Last MLB appearance
- May 30, 1901, for the Cleveland Blues

MLB statistics
- Batting average: .133
- Home runs: 0
- Runs batted in: 4
- Stats at Baseball Reference

Teams
- Pittsburgh Pirates (1901); Cleveland Blues (1901)

Charles Eugene "Truck" Eagan (August 10, 1877 – March 19, 1949) was an American Major League Baseball infielder who played in 1901 with the Pittsburgh Pirates and the Cleveland Blues. He batted and threw right-handed. Eagan had a .133 career batting average.

For his long career in the minor leagues, where he had 1,830 hits and 105 home runs, Eagan was elected to the Pacific Coast League Hall of Fame.

He was born and died in San Francisco, California.
