= Pacific Coast League Hall of Fame =

- Established: 1942
- Type: Professional sports hall of fame
- Website: Official website

The Pacific Coast League Hall of Fame is an American baseball hall of fame which honors players, managers, and executives of the Pacific Coast League (PCL). It was created by the Helms Athletic Foundation of Los Angeles in 1942 to honor those individuals who made significant contributions to the league's ideals. The Hall of Fame inducted its first class in 1943. A special Hall of Fame room was set up at Los Angeles' Wrigley Field on June 27, 1943 and remained there until the ballpark was eventually demolished in 1969. Since then, the hall of fame just like the International League Hall of Fame has no permanent location and exists only as a barnstorming display that travels around the league ballparks throughout the year.

After the 1957 death of founder and main supporter Paul Helms and the arrival of Major League Baseball in the PCL's two largest markets, Los Angeles and San Francisco, the Hall went dormant. In 2003, with the Pacific Coast League celebrating its centennial season, the Hall was revived. In its first new induction in 2003, twenty-one pre-1957 inductees were elected. The aim of the PCL's Hall of Fame Committee was to eventually recognize worthy players from before 1957, as well as those who made more recent contributions to the league. As of the last inductions in 2018, 110 individuals were inducted into the Pacific Coast League Hall of Fame. No new members were added in 2019, and the PCL's 2020 season was cancelled due to the COVID-19 pandemic. The league was known as the Triple-A West in 2021 before reverting to the Pacific Coast League name in 2022.

== Table key ==
Year	Indicates the year of induction ("—" indicates a year between 1943 and 2008; precise records were not kept)
Position(s)	Indicates the inductee's primary playing position(s) or association with the league
†	Indicates a member of the National Baseball Hall of Fame and Museum

== Inductees ==
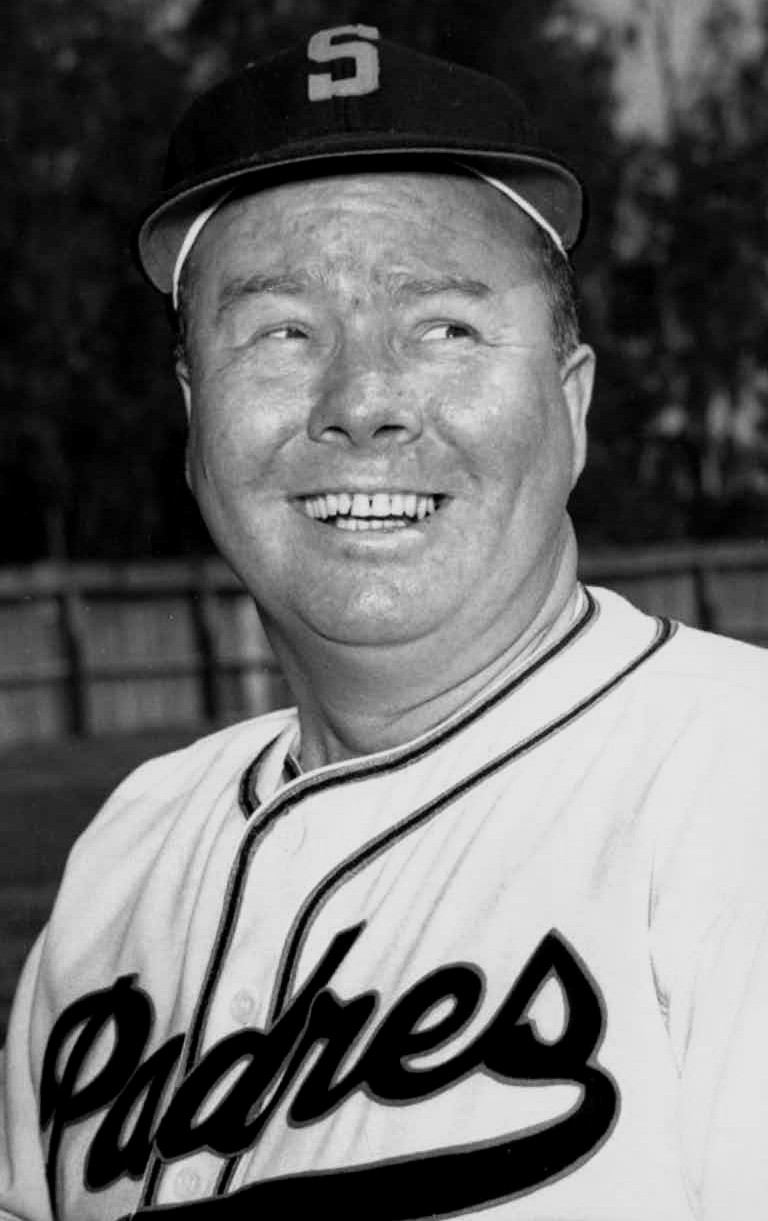
Dick Barrett threw the second perfect game in PCL history for the Seattle Rainiers on May 16, 1948.

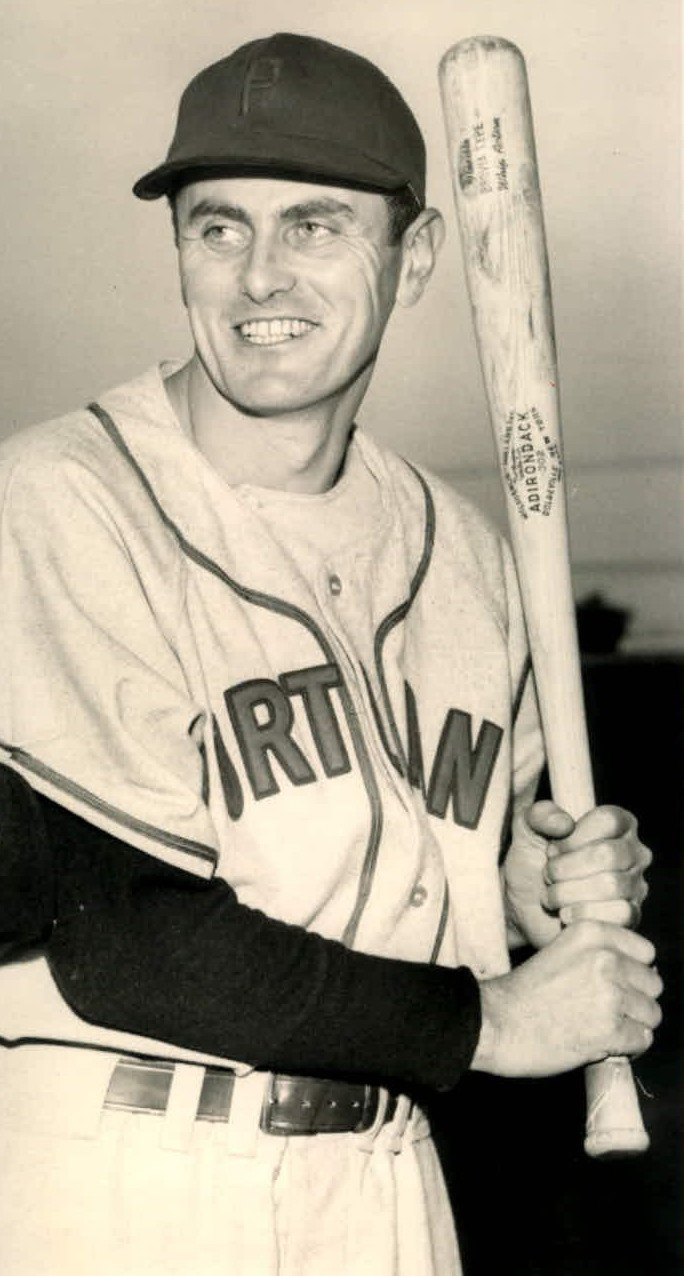
Joe Brovia was a member of the 1946 PCL champion San Francisco Seals.

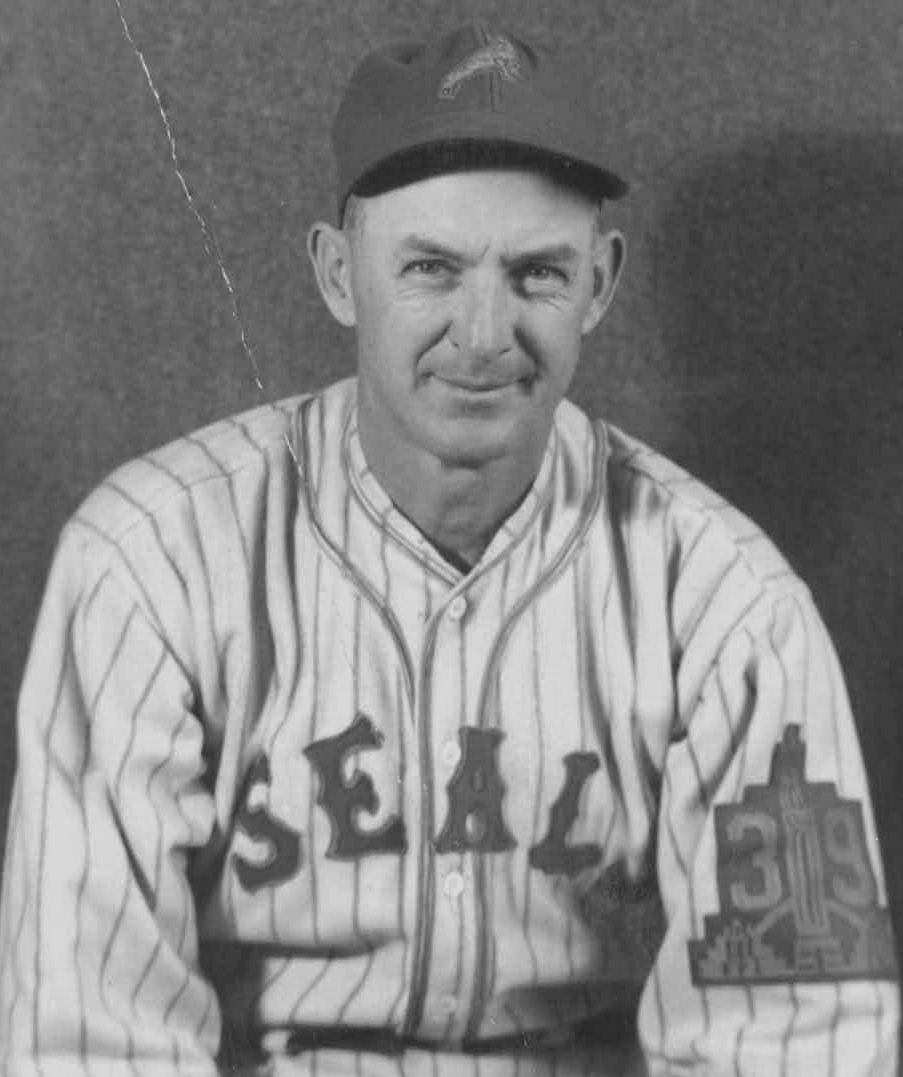
Sam Gibson led the league in shutouts, wins, strikeouts, and ERA in 1931.

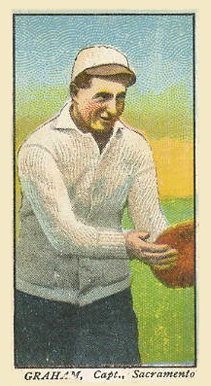
Charlie Graham was a partial owner of the Sacramento Sacts (1909–1914) and San Francisco Seals (1918–1948).

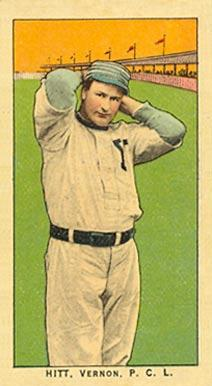
Roy Hitt pitched a no-hitter for the Venice Tigers on July 19, 1914.

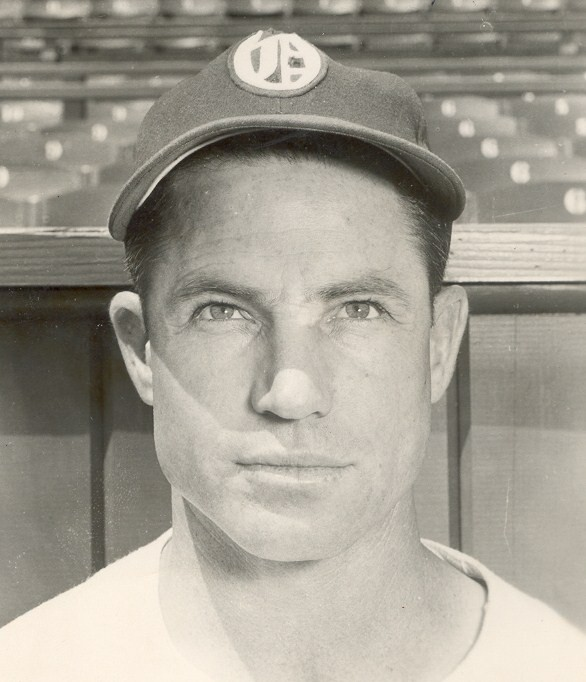
Brooks Holder led the league in triples in 1939.

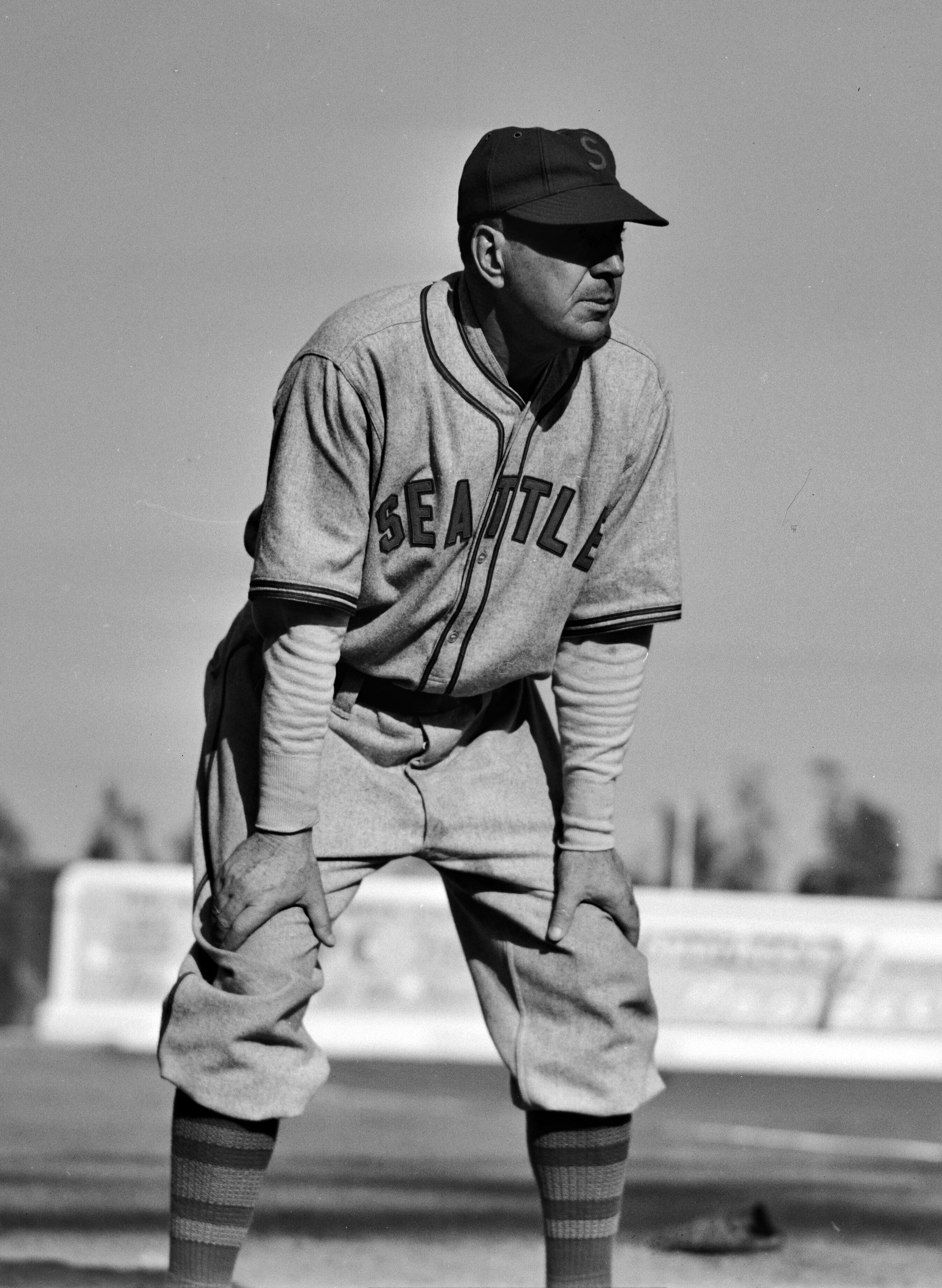
Jack Lelivelt led the Los Angeles Angels to win the 1932 and 1934 PCL championship and the Seattle Rainiers to win the 1940 championship.

Year	Name	Position(s)	Ref.
1943	Johnny Bassler	Catcher	
1943	Doc Crandall	Pitcher	
1943	Pop Dillon	First baseman	
1943	J. Cal Ewing	League president/Team owner	
1943	Ray French	Shortstop	
1943	Jack Lelivelt	Manager	
1943	Walter McCredie	Outfielder/Manager	
1943	Herman Pillette	Pitcher	
1943	Earl Sheely	Infielder	
1943	Frank Shellenback	Pitcher	
1943	Jigger Statz	Outfielder	
1943	Ossie Vitt	Third baseman	
1945	Buzz Arlett	Outfielder/Pitcher	
1945	Red Killefer	Outfielder/Manager	
1950	Dick Barrett	Pitcher	
1950	Spider Baum	Pitcher	
1950	Charlie Graham	Manager/Team owner	
1950	Truck Hannah	Catcher	
1950	Wallace "Happy" Hogan	Catcher/Manager	
1950	Harry Krause	Pitcher	
1950	Bill "Hardrock" Lane	Team owner	
1950	Eddie Mulligan	Third baseman	
1950	Lefty O'Doul	Pitcher/Outfielder/Manager	
1950	Billy Raimondi	Catcher	
1950	Frenchy Uhalt	Outfielder	
1950	Harry Williams	League President/Sports writer	
2003	Steve Bilko	First baseman	
2003	Ike Boone	Outfielder	
2003	Cece Carlucci	Umpire	
2003	Joe DiMaggio^{†}	Outfielder	
2003	Truck Eagan	Shortstop	
2003	Ox Eckhardt	Outfielder	
2003	Brick Eldred	Outfielder	
2003	Tony Freitas	Pitcher	
2003	Sam Gibson	Pitcher	
2003	Dick Gyselman	Third baseman	
2003	Fred Haney	Third baseman/Manager	
2003	Cack Henley	Pitcher	
2003	Smead Jolley	Outfielder	
2003	Ad Liska	Pitcher	
2003	Ernie Lombardi^{†}	Catcher	
2003	Hugh Luby	Second baseman	
2003	Ted Norbert	Outfielder	
2003	Jimmie Reese	Second baseman	
2003	Hal Turpin	Pitcher	
2003	Max West	Outfielder	
2003	Artie Wilson	Shortstop	
2004	Carlos Bernier	Outfielder	
2004	Frankie Crosetti	Shortstop	
2004	Vean Gregg	Pitcher	
2004	Roy Hitt	Pitcher	
2004	Brooks Holder	Outfielder	
2004	Frankie Kelleher	Outfielder	
2004	Gene Mauch	Second baseman	
2004	Earl Rapp	Outfielder	
2004	Buddy Ryan	Outfielder	
2004	Paul Strand	Outfielder	
2004	Bill Sweeney	First baseman/Manager	
2004	Fay Thomas	Pitcher	
2005	Joe Brovia	Outfielder	
2005	Bill Cutler	League President	
2005	Johnny Frederick	Outfielder/First baseman	
2005	Elmer Jacobs	Pitcher	
2005	Ray Prim	Pitcher	
2005	Pants Rowland	League President	
2005	Jack Salveson	Pitcher	
2006	Eddie Basinski	Second baseman	
2006	Dom DiMaggio	Outfielder	
2006	Babe Ellison	Infielder	
2006	Tommy Lasorda^{†}	Manager	
2006	Dario Lodigiani	Second baseman/Third baseman	
2006	Bill Schuster	Shortstop	
2006	Bill Weiss	League executive	
2007	Frank Brazill	Third baseman	
2007	Fuzzy Hufft	Outfielder	
2007	Emil Sick	Team owner	
2007	Paul Waner^{†}	Outfielder	
2008	Wheezer Dell	Pitcher	
2008	Dolly Gray	Pitcher	
2008	Casey Stengel^{†}	Manager	
2008	Lee Susman	Sports cartoonist	
2009	Earl Averill^{†}	Outfielder	
2009	Frank Demaree	Outfielder	
2009	Johnny Moore	Outfielder	
2010	Bobby Bragan	Catcher/Manager	
2010	Larry Jansen	Pitcher	
2010	Gene Lillard	Third baseman/Pitcher	
2011	Joe Marty	Outfielder	
2011	John Monroe	Second baseman	
2011	Elmer Smith	Outfielder	
2012	Duffy Lewis	Outfielder	
2012	Mike Marshall	First basemen/Outfielder	
2012	Kid Mohler	Second basemen	
2013	Sandy Alomar Jr.	Catcher	
2013	Edgar Martínez^{†}	Third baseman/Designated hitter	
2013	Catfish Metkovich	Outfielder	
2014	Lou Almada	Outfielder	
2014	Dave Barbee	Outfielder	
2014	Dave Elmore	Team owner	
2014	Wally Hood	Outfielder	
2015	Del Crandall	Manager	
2015	Lou Novikoff	Outfielder	
2015	Gaylord Perry^{†}	Pitcher	
2016	Willie Davis	Outfielder	
2016	Bob Joyce	Pitcher	
2016	Tim Salmon	Outfielder	
2017	Dick Beverage	PCL Historical Society founder and President Emeritus	
2017	Les Scarsella	First baseman	
2018	Dick Dobbins	Historian	
2018	Marv Gudat	Outfielder	

== See also ==
- Baseball awards#Triple-A
- International League Hall of Fame
