= Cece Carlucci =

American baseball umpire (1917–2008)

- Umpire
- Born: Cesare Carlucci; December 30, 1917; Cudahy, California, U.S.
- Died: September 17, 2008 (aged 90); Wildomar, California, U.S.

Cesare "Cece" Carlucci (December 30, 1917 – September 17, 2008) was an American professional baseball umpire. Carlucci worked in the Pacific Coast League (PCL) for 12 seasons and was inducted into the PCL Hall of Fame in 2003.

== Early life ==
Carlucci was born on December 30, 1917, and raised in Bell, California. He had 13 siblings. During World War II, he was stationed in Alaska. His nickname "Cece" was pronounced exactly like the English word "cease."

== Career ==
After the war, Carlucci wanted to pursue a career in baseball but decided that he was too old to play. He began working as an umpire in winter leagues and then was hired by the California League for the 1946 season. His contract was sold to the Pacific Coast League (PCL) before the 1950 season. During a game that he umpired between the Los Angeles Angels and Hollywood Stars on August 2, 1953, fighting broke out that required 50 Los Angeles Police Department officers to break up. Carlucci said that he was knocked down three times during the brawl.

Carlucci sought a promotion to Major League Baseball (MLB) on three occasions. But, he told friends, at that time MLB wanted big, physically imposing umpires, and Carlucci stood no more than 5'8" tall. When he was not hired by MLB in the 1961 MLB expansion, Carlucci quit the PCL before the 1962 season. He retired from umpiring in professional baseball after having officiated 2,590 consecutive games in organized baseball. Never missing a game, Carlucci worked with broken ribs and after being hit by pitches and hit in the throat. During the 1961 season, the PCL announced that Carlucci's consecutive game streak was the longest in baseball history.

After leaving the PCL, Carlucci continued to umpire amateur competitions. He umpired in Latin America and for the Alaska Goldpanners of Fairbanks in 1967, 1968, and 1972. He umpired the 1970 International World Series in Colombia and the American Legion World Series in 1971. He also umpired for the College World Series and JUCO World Series.

Carlucci manufactured umpiring equipment that he sold through the company "Mr. Ump" in Lake Elsinore, California. In addition to designing equipment for umpires at all levels of baseball, he made the umpiring gear used in the 1984 film The Natural.

== Personal life ==
Carlucci and his wife, Lucille, had a daughter. He died at his home in Wildomar, California on September 17, 2008.
