= Victoria Athletics =

The Victoria Athletics were a Western International League baseball team based in Victoria, British Columbia, Canada that existed from 1946 to 1951. From 1947 to 1949, they were affiliated with the New York Yankees. They played their home games at Royal Athletic Park.

Gil McDougald played for them.
