= San Vicente Creek =

San Vicente Creek may refer to a stream in California, in the United States:

- San Vicente Creek (San Diego County)
- San Vicente Creek (San Mateo County)
- San Vicente Creek (Santa Cruz County)
