= Olga Najera-Ramirez =

American anthropologist

Olga Najera-Ramírez is an American anthropologist at the University of California, Santa Cruz. She has published academic works in the field of Mexican culture. Since 1996, she has served as faculty advisor to Grupo Folklórico Los Mejicas.

== Early life and education ==
Najera-Ramírez was born in Davenport, California to parents who were immigrants to the United States from Mexico. When Najira-Ramirez was eight, her father died and so she worked in the agricultural fields to help support her family. After completing her high school education, Najera-Ramírez enrolled at University of California Santa Cruz and majored in History and Latin American Studies.

Grupo Folklórico Los Mejicas at University of California, Santa Cruz (UCSC) was founded in 1972 at Merrill College. At the time, the Mexican population in Santa Cruz were a minority. Students were not permitted to speak in Spanish in school. In the background was the Chicano movement (the Mexican civil rights movement in the United States). Through Los Mejicas, students reached out to the local community in ways that supported the Chicano movement. For example, they performed Folklorico dance during Chicano protests and rallies. Najera-Ramírez joined Los Mejicas in 1974 continued to dance with Los Mejicas until the end of her undergraduate studies.

Najera-Ramírez's participation in Grupo Folklorico Los Mejicas sparked her interest in the dance and folklore traditions of Mexico. In 1976, Najera-Ramírez met Rafael Zamarripa, a Baile Folklorico master from the Asociacion Nacional de Grupos Folkloricos whose presentation furthered her interest.

Najera-Ramírez enrolled at the University of Guadalajara, Jalisco, Mexico to study dance. In 1979, she returned to the United States and took a Master's degree in Latin American Studies from the University of Texas. In 1987, Najera-Ramírez received a doctoral degree in Anthropology (Mexican folklore) also from the University of Texas.

== Academic career ==
Najera-Ramirez is a full professor at University of California, Santa Cruz. Her field of anthropological research is trans-national cultural studies, particularly the expressive forms of culture; the formation of identity, and relationships of power. Najera-Ramirez has focussed on the incorporation of culture making practices (such as dance and rodeo) from Mexico into popular culture in the United States.

== Documentaries ==
In 1996, Najera-Ramirez produced La Charreada: Rodeo a la Mexicana, a twenty-six-minute documentary examining Mexican rodeo as part of the Chicano movement.

in 2011, Najera-Ramírez produced a documentary entitled Danza Folklórica Escénica: El Sello Artístico de Rafael Zamarripa. It examines the development of folklórico dance through the career of Rafael Zamarripa.
