= Grupo Folklórico Los Mejicas =

Los Mejicas
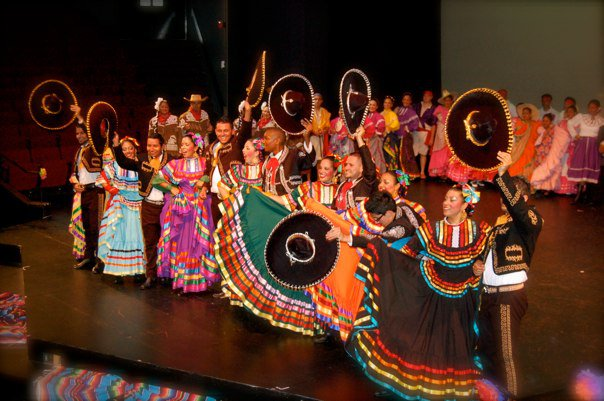
- Once a Mejica, Always a Mejica.
- Formation: 1972
- Type: Folkloric dance group
- Location: Santa Cruz, California, UCSC
- Remarks: Dances from Sonora Bronco, Sinaloa, Yucatan, Baja Norte, Guerrero, Aguascalientes, Chiapas, Jalisco (For 40th Anniversary, 2012)..

Grupo Folklórico Los Mejicas is a Mexican folkloric dance group at the University of California, Santa Cruz.

The mission of Grupo Folklórico Los Mejicas is to conserve the traditional Mejicas style; to teach the Mexican culture and historical aspects of the nation through art and interpretation in their dance. The Mejicas use history and art to bring together students and community members.

== History ==
Grupo Folklórico Los Mejicas is one of the oldest student organizations on the UC Santa Cruz campus. It was initiated at Merrill College in 1972 by a small group of students who taught each other dances. Since then, the group has grown and branched out. To this day, Los Mejicas has over 60 active members.

Los Mejicas has been dedicated to the preservation and continuation of Mexican folkloric culture. Here, both students and community members learn a variety of dances and repertoires that change every year. The group is self-taught by elected student members and also learns dances from the occasional guest-instructor. Instructors include Maestros from neighboring groups, student members who have learned dances at different dance conferences, and instructors who have previously been in the group. Los Mejicas is committed to group retention and preservation, and serves as more than just a dance group and student organization; it provides a safe space and is a community of peers bound together by the love of dance, and of Mexican culture.

== Baile Folklórico ==
Baile Folklórico is a form of traditional dance in many Latin American countries. Though its physical presence in Latin America is prevalent, its presence in literature and research is very limited. However, Mexican Folklórico is one of dances that has had some research. Olga Najera-Ramirez, a notable Anthropologist professor at UC Santa Cruz, is a key contributor to the literature of Mexican Folklórico dance. Professor Nájera-Ramírez teaches courses on folklore theory, expressive culture, dance, cultural performances, and Greater Mexico. She also wrote, directed, and produced two bilingual documentaries; the most recent being Danza Folklórica Escénica: El Sello Artístico de Rafael Zamarripa (Mexican Folkloric Dance: Rafael Zamarripa’s Artistic Trademark), which tells the story of this vibrant art form through the life and work of the internationally acclaimed artist and choreographer, Rafael Zamarripa. In her undergraduate career at UCSC, Najera-Ramirez was also a committed member of Los Mejicas and currently acts as their faculty advisor.

== Cultural Representation ==
Folklórico groups like Los Mejicas act as a public symbol for Mexican culture. The performance and dance of folkloric dance display the richness of the Mexican heritage. Each dance performed by Los Mejicas consists of representing different regions in Mexico and historical periods of Mexican culture through dance. There are over 21 regions in Mexico that have their own cultural traditions and performances of Baile Folklórico. Los Mejicas have performed regions such as: Chihuahua, San Luis Potosi, Guerrero, Tamaulipas, Veracruz, Sinaloa, Jalisco, Nayarit Costa, Colima, Durango, Puebla, Tabasco, Veracruz, Sonora Bronco, Yucatán, Baja Norte, Aguascalientes, Chiapas, and many more from past years.

Mexican folkloric dance was used to represent a cultural symbol of national unity in post revolutionary Mexico. Mexican folkloric dance is unique to the Mexican culture by representing dances that originated in the indigenous areas of Mexico. Mexican folk dancing varies from region to region. In Guadalajara, the Jarabe Tapatia, or Mexican hat dance, is popular. The Jarabe is a courting dance and also the national dance of Mexico. In Guerrero, many folk dances mimic animal movements-the Iguana is a popular dance. The national sense of unity of folkloric dance is thus a result of each region's distinct performance.

Cultural Significance

The mission of Los Mejicas is derived from the folkloric reasoning of promoting the Mexican heritage. The Mejicas wish to celebrate and preserve the beauty of Mexican heritage and culture through dance. Their well known slogan, "Once a Mejica, Always a Mejica", acts not only as motto, but also as a statement of a sense of identity and as a sense of belonging. It is a tagline that holds both literal and symbolic meaning, one that represents more than the simple association of having once participated in the group; it indicates something deeper, an acknowledgement of where one has come from, and the promise to take that knowledge into the future. A UCSC student and Mejica, Edgar Ontiveros, says as he was growing up in Tijuana, Mexico he was always surrounded by folklórico:

“It was just something that I took for granted, but when I came here to university and I realized that I was kind of far away from home, I started getting in touch with folklórico as a way to feel connected with Mexico,” he says. And the group continues to be an avenue that connects that culture with campus life. “The group provides a space where you can feel welcome at this university,” he says. For Latino students and non-Latino students alike, Los Mejicas provides the opportunity to connect to and learn more about Mexican culture.

== Costumes ==
Traditional folkloric costume varies across each Mexican region. The attire in the Federal District of Mexico reflects the traditional Spanish influence while the Yucatán region reflects indigenous traditions. Northern Mexico folkloric costumes also have their unique style—the costumes from the Jalisco region in Mexico have women wear brightly colored ruffled skirts that are trimmed with ribbons and ornate hair pieces. The region of Veracruz instead has women wear beautiful white dresses that are full of lace. The coastal region of Mexico, specifically Sinaloa, has women wear lighter and more colorful dresses. Generally, male dancers wear black slacks; a black, wide brimmed hat (sombrero); and a red belt and tie. The Mejicas incorporate the different styles each Mexican region represents in their costume attire for performances. Based on what region the members of Los Mejicas will perform, they create their own choreography. Each costume is unique and is used in different ways depending on the region.

== Membership ==
Los Mejicas comprises both students of the University of California, Santa Cruz and Santa Cruz community members. It has a set of Core Members who are voted in by Mejicas members at the end of each academic year. Core consists of two co-directors, two costume directors, an events coordinator, a finance coordinator and a historian. Los Mejicas accept dancers of all levels of experience. Los Mejicas functions as a student organization and club, but also functions as a class where students can enroll through the Latin American and Latino Studies or through the Anthropology department for class credit and fulfillment of an arts general education requirement. It is open to students of all cultural and ethnic backgrounds.

== Events ==
Los Mejicas performs at a myriad of cultural events on campus at UC Santa Cruz, but also off campus in the Santa Cruz community. Events include things such as Spanish Camp, ORALE “Brought to you by MECHA”, Danzantes Unidos Festival “Carnaval de Muertitos", Womyn of Color Conference 2011 “Celebrating Our Stories: Breaking Traditional Constraints and Striving for Empowerment”, UCSC Day by the Bay Celebration, Cinco de Mayo Celebration at Santa Cruz High School, Cinco de Mayo Celebration at Soledad Prison, Relay For Life 2011, Multi-cultural Festival “MCF", Baile Folklórico Stanford Annual Concierto de la Primavera at Stanford University and finally at the end of the year spring show celebrating their 40th anniversary: Mejicas, hoy y siempre – Mejicas, now and forever. Since its founding in 1972, Los Mejicas finishes off the school year by showcasing all the regions they have practiced since the beginning of the school year. Each year Los Mejicas represent about 8 different regions in their annual spring shows at the end of the academic school year in June.
