= Davenport tide pools =

Coordinates: 37.0234°N 122.2157°W

The Davenport Tide Pools are located near the town of Davenport, California, in the United States. They are located where Davenport Landing Road loops to the sea off Highway 1. Parallel ridges running perpendicular to the sea separate the tide pools from each other and make them unique, producing communities in which organisms which normally could not live in close proximity to each other can do so. The beach is day use only, open sunrise to sunset.

Ridges in Tide Pools

== Geography ==
The normal tide pool is separated into two main zones. The intertidal zone and the subtidal zone. The intertidal zone is covered with sea water only during high tide, while the subtidal zone is closer to the ocean and is covered during low tide. The distinctive separation of organisms into bands along the shoreline is called zonation. However, the Davenport Tide Pools are unique in the fact that there are many rifts and ridges in the rock formations, allowing water to reach high on the beach during low tide. This allows species that normally are not found together to live close.

In contrast, gastropods are not fed upon in proportion to their abundance and availability. Only 2 species of gastropods, the black turban snail, Tegula, and the ribbed limpet, Acwaea scabra, are of any real importance to Pisaster as food. Of these, A. scabra lives higher in the intertidal region than Pisaster, its lower limit overlapping only slightly the upper limit of P. ochraceus.

As shown, the Davenport Tide Pools' rifts and ridges allow sea stars to reach limpets and snails in high tidal zones. This is a very prominent geographical feature at the Davenport Tide Pools since one would not normally see sea stars so high up the beach.

The tide pools also have multiple sea caves and a smaller rock formation that is reminiscent of the bridges Natural Bridges State Beach. The last prominent geological feature is the high cliffs above the tide pools.

== Tide pool life ==
Rocky Cliffs above Davenport Tide Pools

Some of the most prosperous forms of life at the Davenport Tide Pools are sea stars. This is due to the rifts and ridges up and down the tide pools, these allow sea stars to move farther up the tidal zone. Normally, sea stars are subtidal organisms that live closer to the ocean, because they die when they become too dry. Their prey are mussels that live up and down the tidal zone, since their hard shells allow them to live in drier areas for longer. The rifts and ridges at the Davenport Tide Pools allow the sea stars to feed off of mussels at higher tidal zones during lower tides. Since the mussels are only a few inches above a rift that is level with the subtidal zone.

Other tide-pool life includes many species of mussels, limpets, seaweed, barnacles, and surfgrass. These organisms are also affected by the geographical features of the tide pools. The seaweed and surfgrass are able to grow farther up the tidal zones. Many sea stars have adapted to hide under the seaweed and surf, as a way to not dry out. This than allows them to feed on the various higher tidal zone organisms during high tide. The main diet of the sea star in Northern California is mussels. Since the Davenport Tide Pools have an abundance of mussels, sea stars do not resort to consuming other less desirable organisms.

Phyllospadix (surfgrass) can be found growing on rocks in the tide pools. It likes regions of the tide pools that are not too shallow or too deep and the Davenport tide pools have many such areas.

=== Sea anemones ===
There is a diverse group of small sea anemones that reside in the Davenport tide pool ecosystem including the sunburst anemone and the giant green anemone. These sea anemones use an adhesive foot (pedal disk) to attach themselves to rocks on the floor of the tide pools and feed off small animals living in the tide pools. They have a column-shaped body known as the column, which is topped with tentacles which surround the oral disk. At the center of the oral disk is the sea anemone's mouth.

==== Sunburst anemone ====
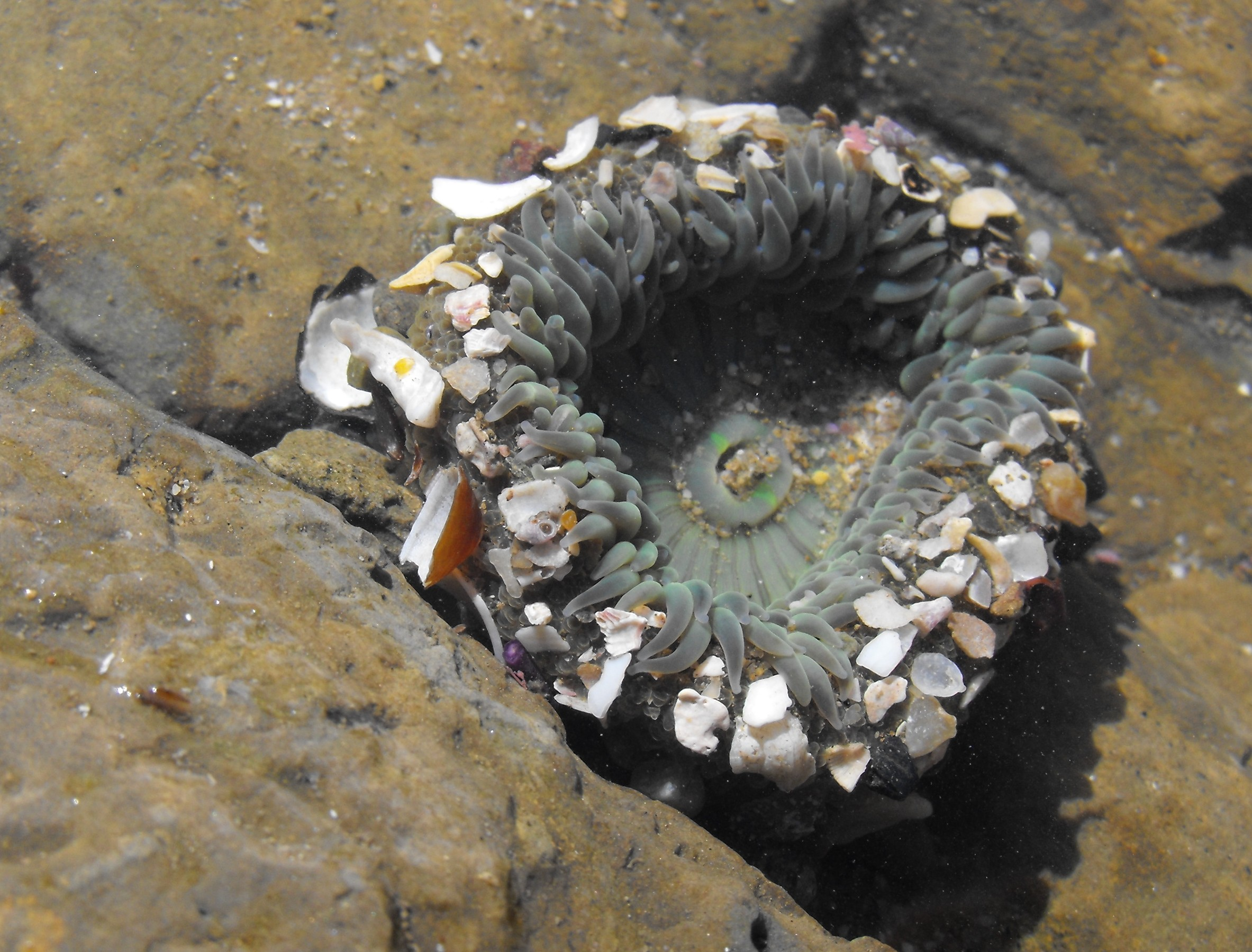
Sunburst Anemone

The sunburst anemone (Anthopleura sola) lives in the middle intertidal zone of the Davenport tide pools where it is able to latch on to exposed rocks and feeds off any small animals in the tide pools that it can eat. The Sunburst Anemone can be identified by the radiating line pattern on the oral disk with whitish - pinkish colored tentacles and green - white colored column which is often covered in shell debris.

==== Giant green anemone ====
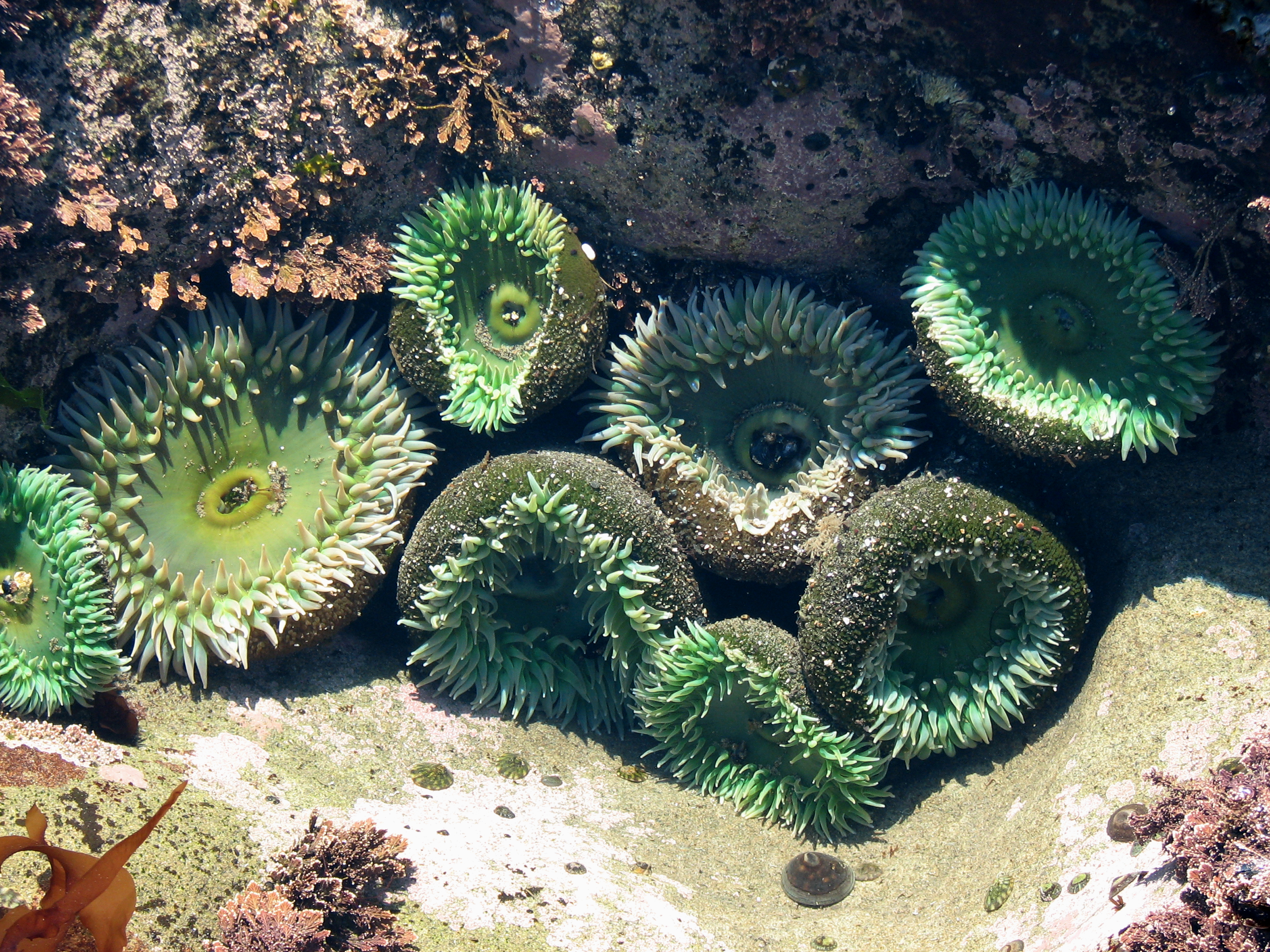
Giant Green Anemone

The giant green anemone (Anthopleura xanthogrammica) lives in the intertidal/subtidal zones of the Davenport tide pools and can be found at depths up to 15 feet. They primarily feed off sea urchins, detached mussels, crabs, and small fish, but like to attach themselves to mussel beds where they have a large source of food. Gian Green Anemones can be identified by their bright green tentacles and oral disk.

== Gallery ==
Sea Star Going to Higher Tidal zone to eat

Sea Star under Surf Grass
