= Davenport, California =

Davenport
- Census-designated place
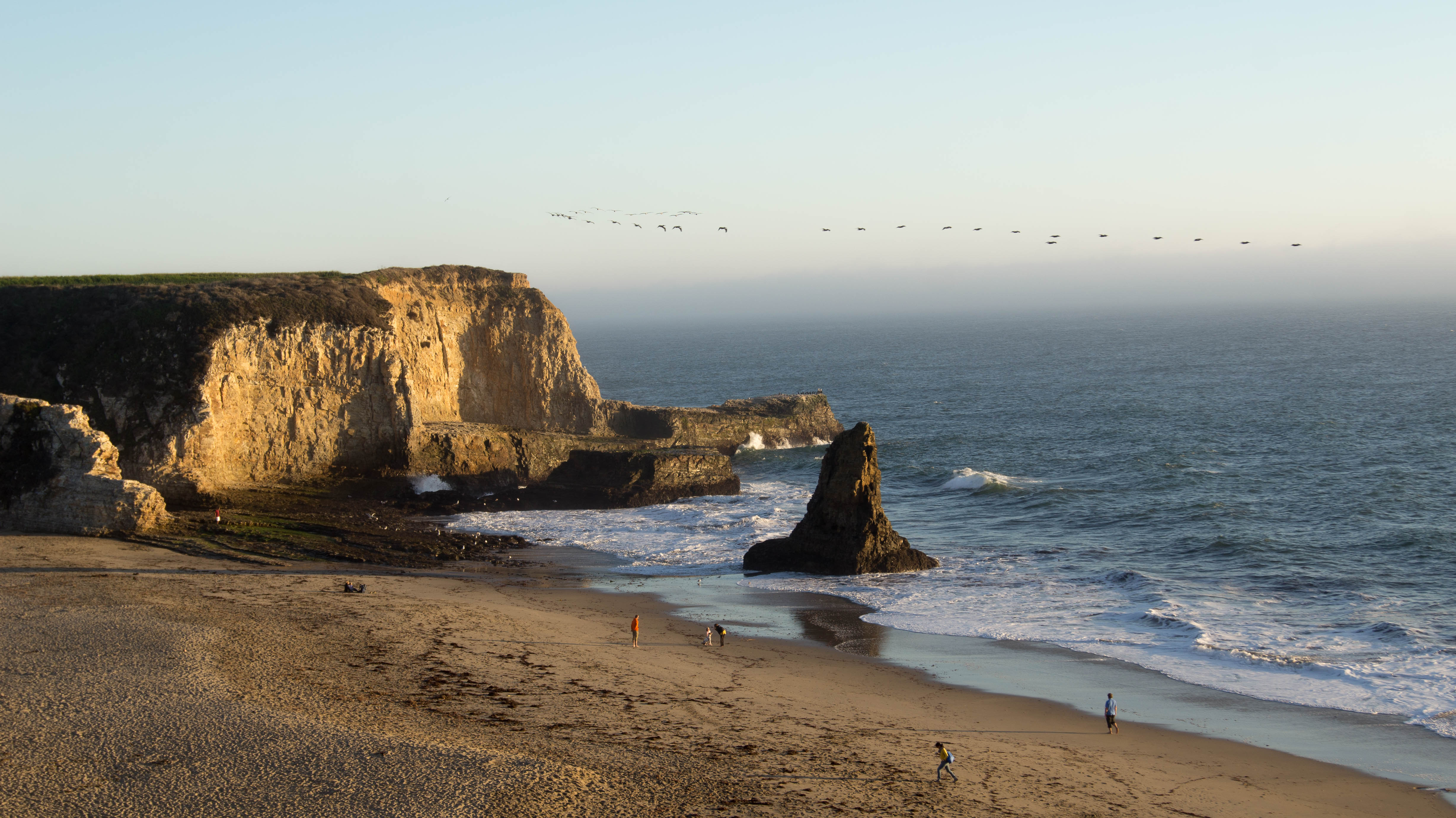
- Shark Tooth Rock & Davenport Beach

- Location of Davenport in Santa Cruz County, California.

- Position in California.
- Coordinates: 37°01′05″N 122°11′50″W
- Country: United States
- State: California
- County: Santa Cruz

Area
  - Total: 2.85 sq mi (7.37 km^{2})
  - Land: 2.85 sq mi (7.37 km^{2})
  - Water: 0 sq mi (0.00 km^{2}) 0%
- Elevation: 259 ft (79 m)

Population (2020)
  - Total: 388
  - Density: 136.4/sq mi (52.66/km^{2})
- Time zone: UTC−8 (Pacific (PST))
  - Summer (DST): UTC−7 (PDT)
- ZIP Code: 95017
- Area code: 831
- GNIS feature ID: 2582991

Davenport is a census-designated place (CDP) in Santa Cruz County, California, United States. It is also referred to as a hamlet or town. In the greater region north of the city of Santa Cruz, the areas of Davenport, Bonny Doon, and Swanton are comparable and proximal. Davenport sits at an average elevation of 177 feet (54 m). As of 2023, the town's population stands at 537.

== Overview ==
Davenport lies along the coast of the Pacific Ocean, situated approximately nine miles north of Santa Cruz, on Highway One. Originally on the banks of San Vicente Creek, the town expanded to the north during the twentieth century.

The town is notable for its scenery, with numerous bluffs and cliff faces stretching along its perimeter, as well as foothills and forests toward its east. Davenport Beach and the coastline in its periphery are prominent sites for surfers and tourists. Agriculture and aquaculture are prevalent, with farms cultivating varieties of fresh produce and seafood harvests. The remains of a closed cement plant, last operated by Cemex in 2010, lie just north of the small concentration of homes in Davenport.

== History ==
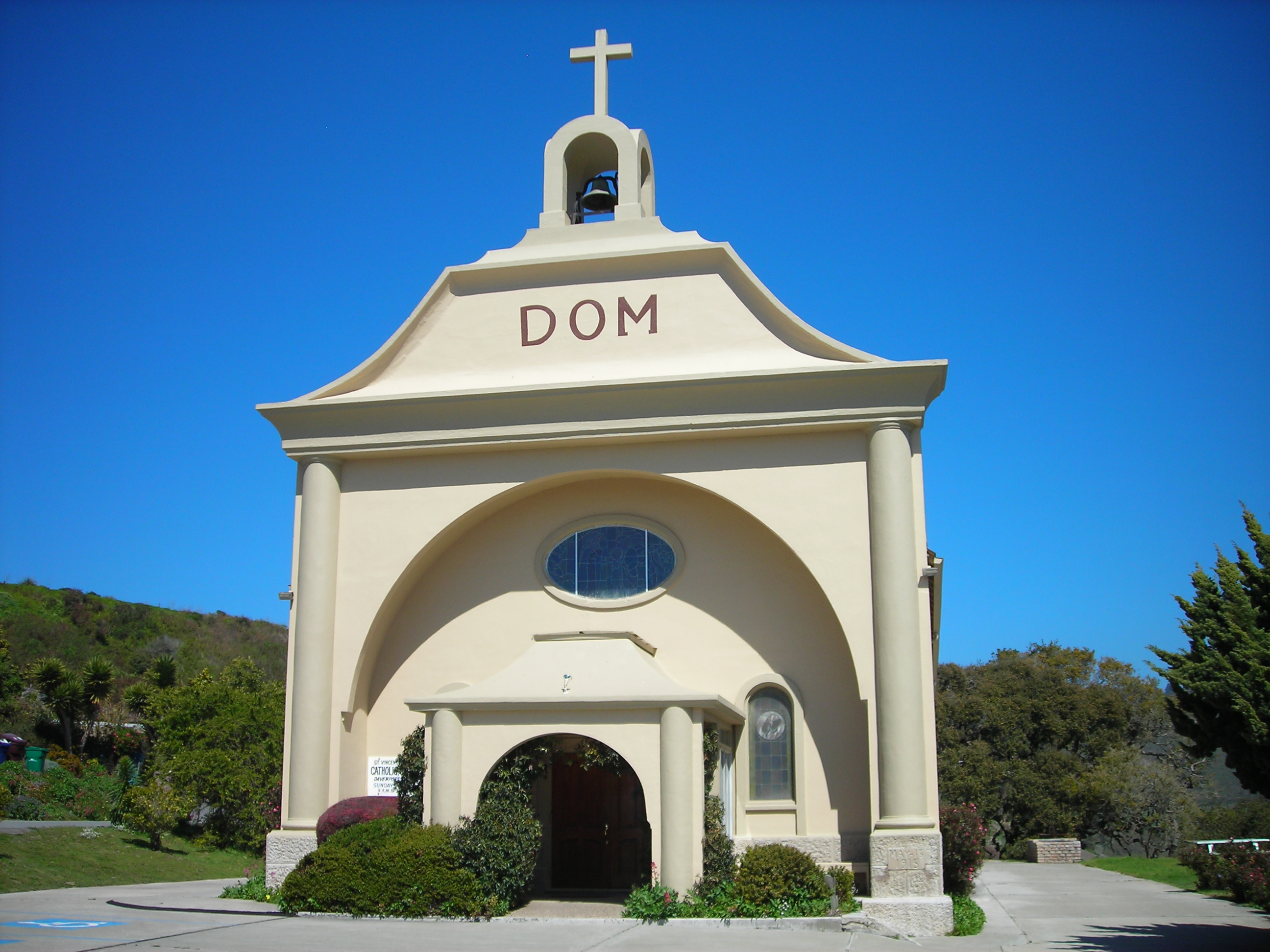
St. Vincent de Paul Church.

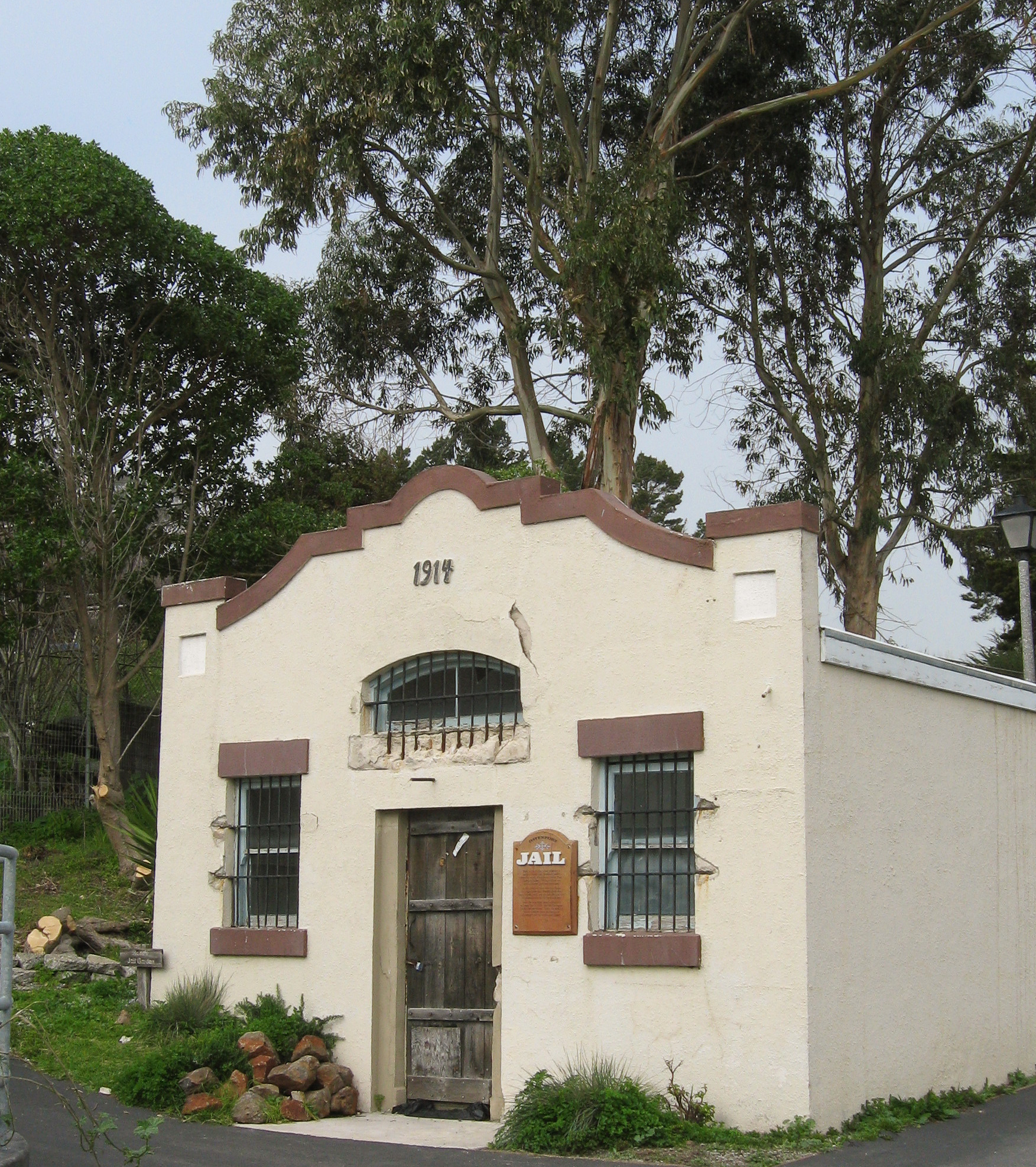
Historic Davenport jail, now a museum

A whaling captain named John Pope Davenport settled at El Jarro Point, about half a mile from today's town, in 1867. Davenport built a 400-foot wharf at the mouth of Agua Puerca Creek ("agua puerca" translates to "muddy water"). This wharf was built to load the lumber brought down from the hills for shipment to Santa Cruz. A small village grew up around the port and was known as Davenport Landing. The local post office began operations in 1874, but was known only as Davenport. Agua Puerca Creek lived up to its name by bringing down so much mud that the port filled up and steamers could not tie up to the wharf to load lumber. A small extension did not solve the problem. Then a competitor built a longer wharf, but it was destroyed in a storm. Captain Davenport went bankrupt and moved to Santa Cruz. The post office in Davenport Landing closed in 1889.

When Captain Davenport went bankrupt, his assets were auctioned off to pay creditors. Among the items auctioned off were whaling items leading to speculation that he carried out whaling activities from the port, especially after he started losing money. However, no eyewitness reports of whaling activities at Davenport Landing have been found.

In 1905, an east coast businessman named William Dingee bought the Santa Cruz Lime Company, which had a lime quarry on the banks of San Vicente Creek, south of Davenport Landing. In the following year, the Santa Cruz Portland Cement Company manufacturing plant was built nearby. At that time, the closed Davenport Landing post office opened up in the settlement that grew up around the cement plant. It again only used the name of Davenport; hence, the name of the town.

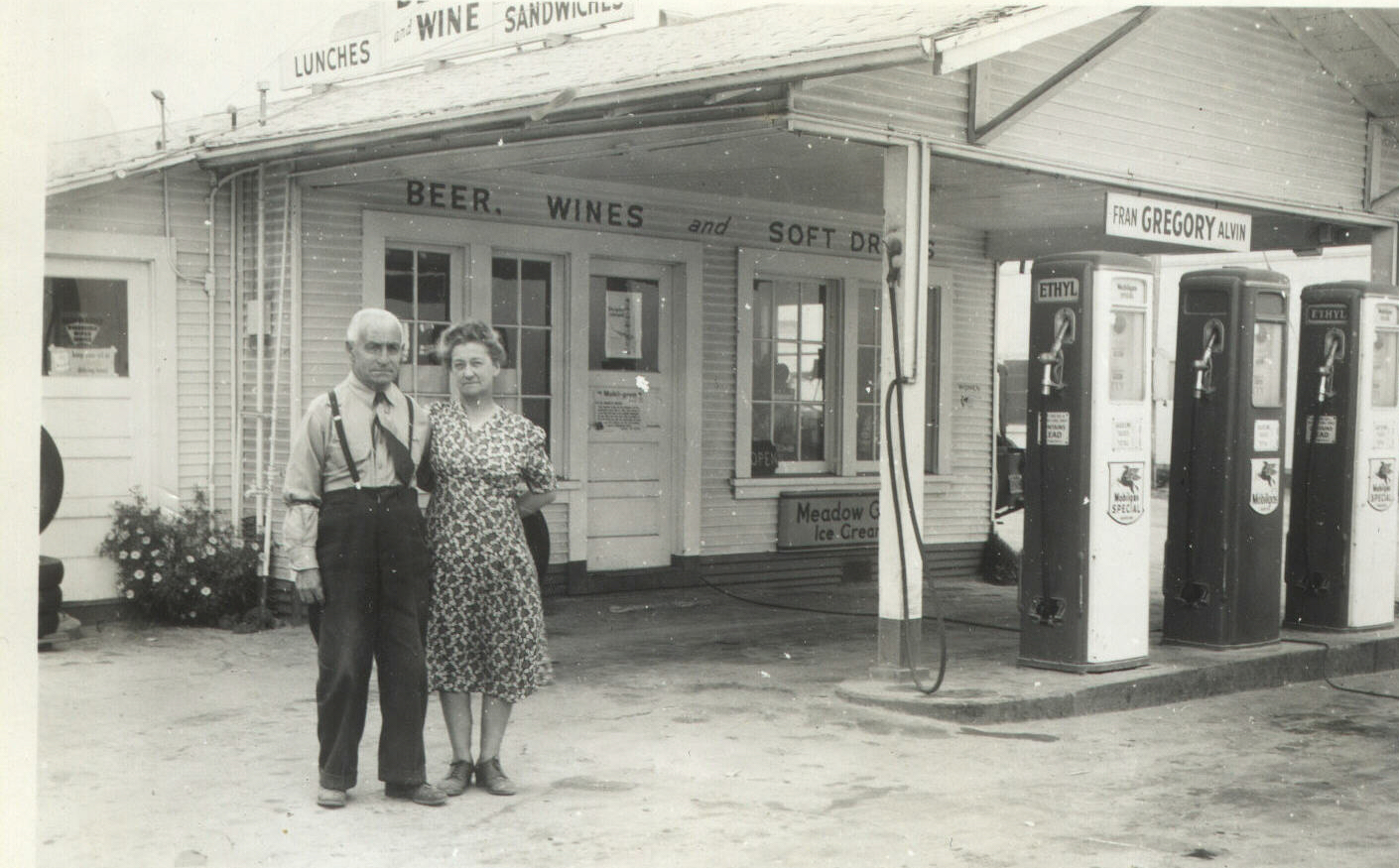
Albert & Elvetzia Gregory, founders of Gregory's Country Store

Another important piece of history of the town of Davenport lies behind the walls of the current Costa Azul Mexican restaurant. For over 50 years the Gregory's Country Store and Service Station operated from within the very walls of this building and was a landmark along Highway 1. The “Store” as locals called it, was a popular hub for the community and the areas surrounding Davenport. Seeing the need for servicing the growing number of automobiles, the Store was founded in 1925 by Albert Gregory, the son of French-Canadian immigrants Joseph and Annie Gregory from Quebec, Canada, and his new wife, Elvezia Rosselli Gregory from Switzerland. Albert grew up on his parent's ranch, a 320-acre property located near the headwaters of Scotts Creek in Bonny Doon.

The gas station first opened as a Red Crown dealership, then later changed to the more popular Gilmore gas. Over the years the Store expanded to offer a complete selection of groceries, a deli, an old-fashioned soda fountain and lunch counter, where customers could find cigarettes, liquor, wine and beer, hardware, postcards, souvenirs and other novelty items for sale inside.

After World War II, Albert's two sons, Alvin and Francis Gregory, returned home and gradually took over management of the business as partners. In 1956 they remodeled and opened the gas station as a full service Mobil gas station offering both regular and premium unleaded gas and diesel for farmers’ equipment and the many two-trailer cement semi-trucks traveling to and from the Davenport cement plant. During their partnership, both men became well known leaders of the community: Alvin serving for two terms on the Santa Cruz County Board of Supervisors (1947–1955) and as President of the Davenport Volunteer Fire Department; and Francis serving for 23 years as Fire Chief of the Volunteer Fire Department (1940–1963), the youngest Fire Chief in California at the time, and as a member of the board of trustees for the Pacific Elementary School District.

Gregory's Country Store and Service Station was sold upon retirement of the Gregory brothers in 1976. Several years afterwards the gas station closed followed by closure of the Store for good.

Today, Davenport has three restaurants, a hotel (at one of the restaurants), two art galleries, a store, a post office, and Pacific School, the only school in the Pacific Elementary School District.

The ZIP Code is 95017 and the community is inside area code 831.

== Points of interest ==
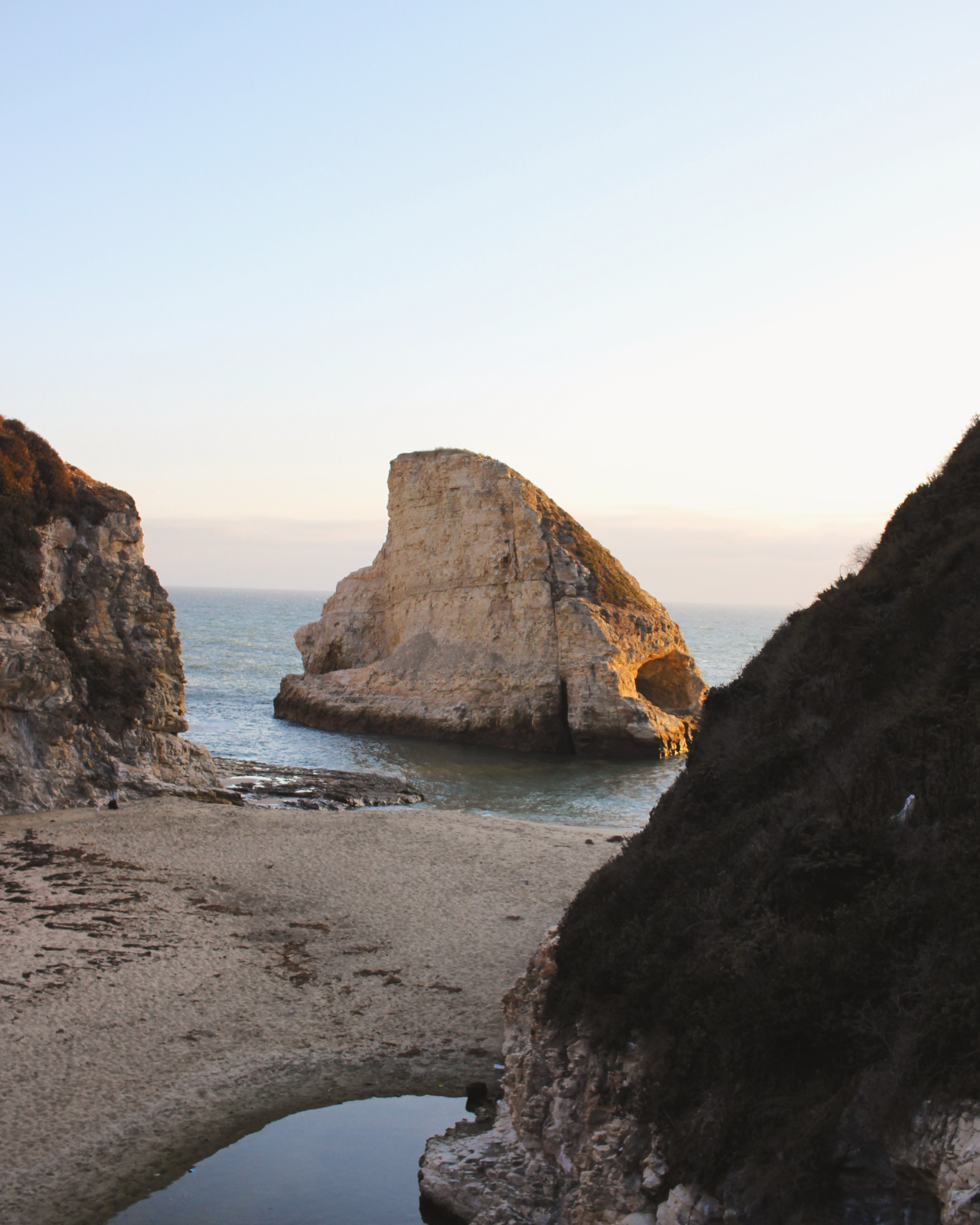
Shark Fin Cove, a noted photographer's spot along the coast of Davenport.

Cotoni Coast Dairies

Deriving its namesake from the Cotoni tribe of the Ohlone indigenous community, the Cotoni Coast Dairies are a series of trails federally operated by the Bureau of Land Management. Constructed from 2021 to 2025 by the Santa Cruz Mountains Trail Stewardship, the hiking and biking trails wind through a combination of natural ecosystems and grazing land. Forests of coastal redwoods, oak woodlands, and grasslands provide habitats for many California species.

American Abalone

Davenport is home to American Abalone, which produces farm-raised California red abalone. California farm-raised abalone has been selected by the Monterey Bay Aquarium's Sea Watch program as an excellent choice for environmentally conscious seafood consumers.

Cement Plant and San Vicente Redwoods

The cement plant was built in 1906 and operated as the Santa Cruz Portland Cement Company. The company expanded its infrastructure in 1934 with the construction of a 2,327 foot concrete-reinforced steel shipping pier, designed to pump dry cement from the nearby plant into offshore cargo ships.

One of the two surviving concrete pilings from the Davenport shipping pier.

In subsequent years, it was operated by Pacific Cement and Aggregates (1956), Lone Star Cement Corporation (1965), and RMC Pacific Materials (1998). In 2005, the plant was acquired by Mexico's CEMEX corporation. That same year, the plant was reported to have emitted 100 pounds of mercury. The presence of high levels of chromium-6, purported to be a cancer-causing chemical, led to strained relationships between CEMEX, the Environmental Protection Agency, and County of Santa Cruz.

CEMEX ceased operations and decommissioned the plant in 2010. The 8500-acre parcel is now referred to as the San Vicente Redwoods. The San Vicente Redwoods is the largest privately held redwood forest in the Santa Cruz Mountains, constituting 8,532 acres itself and linking 27,000 acres of protected land.

Davenport Tide Pools

Davenport is home to numerous tide pools along its coastline. Rugged cliffs and rocky shoreline reveals a vaste biodiversity at low tide. Sea anemones, starfish, crabs, mussels, and colorful seaweed can be found in shallow pools carved into the rocks.

Davenport Jail

Davenport Jail is an inactive facility with two cells, built in 1914. Until its decommissioning in 1936, the jail was used twice. Today it is a museum featuring coastal history supported by volunteers from the Santa Cruz Museum of Art and History.

Saint Vincent DePaul Church

St. Vincent DePaul Church, in Davenport, was built entirely of cement from the local cement factory in 1914. The Church is the subject of a famous photograph by Ansel Adams.

Southern Pacific Freight Line

The southern portion of the Ocean Shore Railroad operated between Davenport and Santa Cruz from 1907 to 1920. The Southern Pacific freight line between the two communities is still in place.

== Geography ==
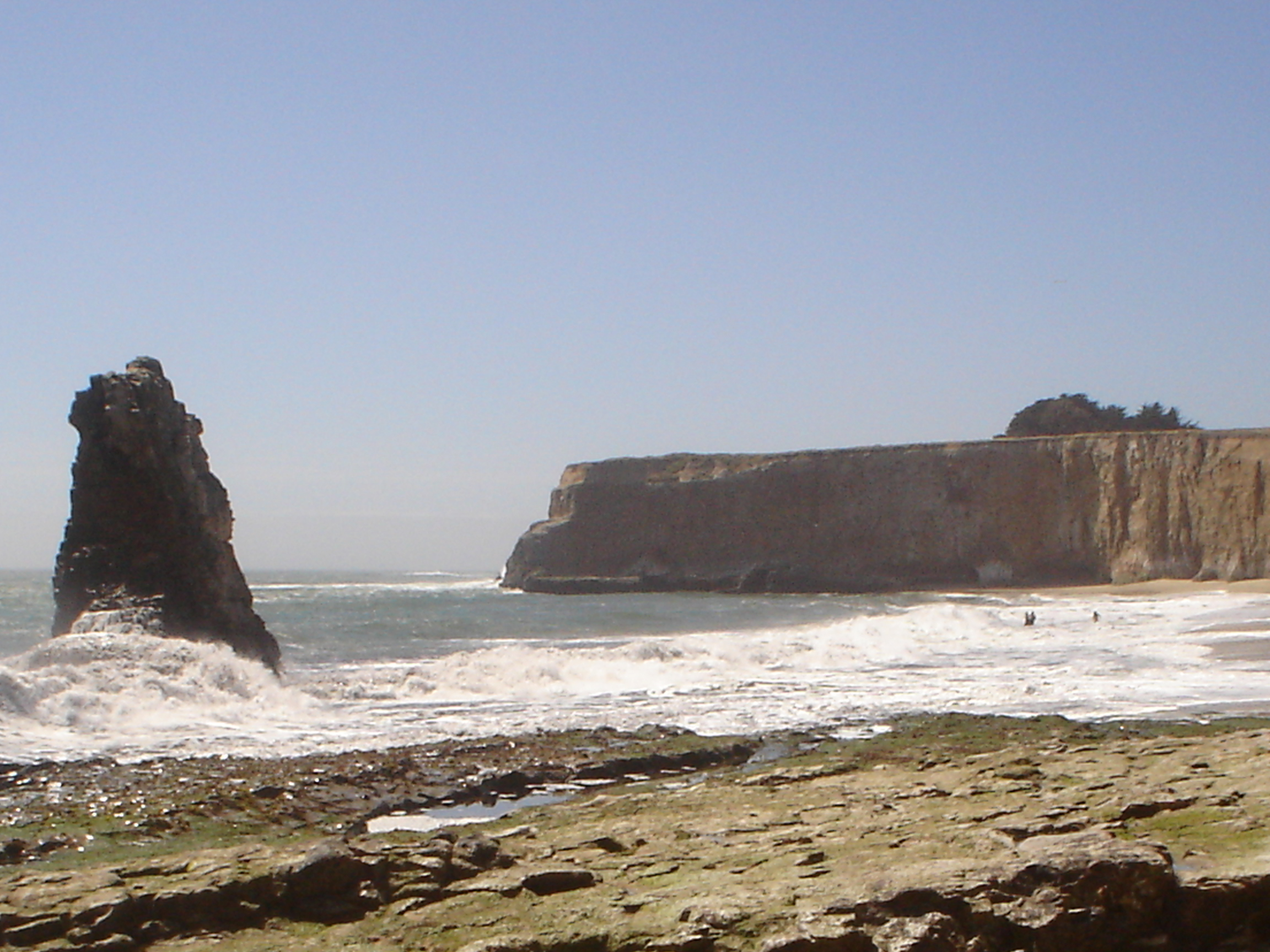
Davenport Beach

Davenport lies at 37°00′42″N 122°11′27″W. According to the United States Census Bureau, the CDP covers an area of 2.8 square miles (7.4 km^{2}). Davenport has topographic variance, with beaches at sea level and foothills reaching up to 1000 feet in elevation at its border. The headwaters of the San Vicente Creek start from these foothills, flowing down to the ocean.

The town is located approximately 8.8 miles (14.23 km) south of the San Mateo County border, specifically from the Ano Nuevo State Marine Conservation Area. To the direct north is the unincorporated community of Swanton; the California Polytechnic University of San Luis Obispo manages a ranch in this community, known as the Swanton Pacific Ranch. Immediately east of the town are the Santa Cruz Mountains and the neighboring community of Bonny Doon. Big Basin State Park, an area heavily affected by fires, is located approximately 7 miles (11.5 km) northeast of the town.

Davenport is situated amongst fault lines; the San Gregorio Fault lies westward, submerged in the Pacific Ocean, while the San Andreas Fault stretches east of the town. The town is part of the greater Monterey Bay-Tularcitos fault zone, a complex system of strike-slip faults.

== Geology ==
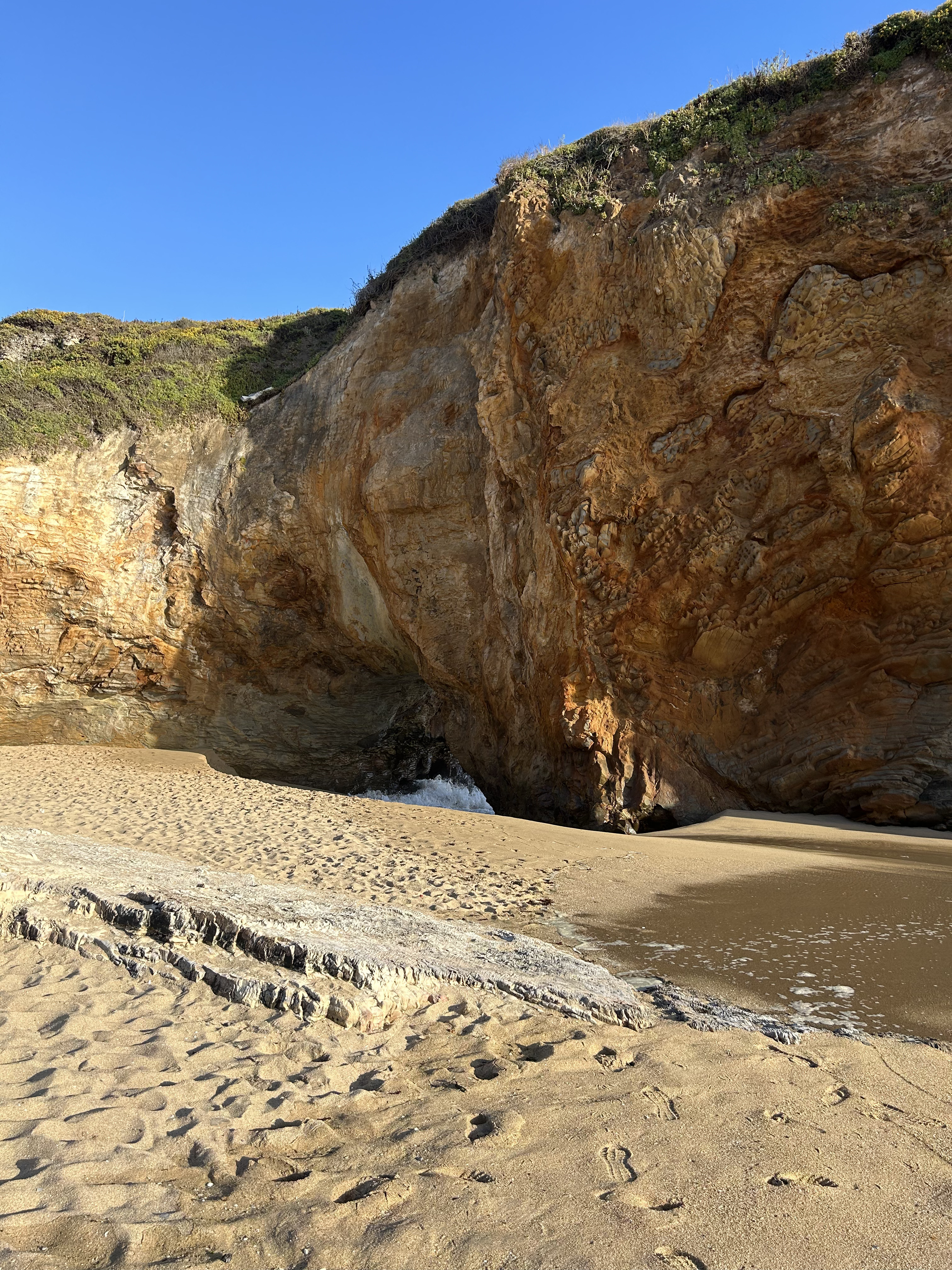
This cliff connects Panther Beach and Hole in the Wall Beach in Davenport.

Due to surrounding faults, the town is currently in a gradual shift northward, culminating in the bluffs, cliffs, and other geological features of the region. The coastal landscape features various rock formations, including marine terraces, which can be traced back to the Purisima Formation. This formation contains sediments deposited from the latest Miocene (7 million years ago) to the late Pliocene (2.5 million years ago).

The geology of the beach bluffs and cliffs consists of mudstone, siltstone, and sandstone. The rock layers and bluffs are constantly weathered by oceanic erosion, as well as activities of the various industries and residential areas along the coast.

== Climate ==
Davenport has mild weather throughout the year, enjoying a Mediterranean climate (Köppen Csb) characterized by cool, wet winters and warm, mostly dry summers. Due to its proximity to Monterey Bay, fog and low overcast are common during the night and morning hours, especially in the summer.

Climate data for Davenport, CA
Month	Jan	Feb	Mar	Apr	May	Jun	Jul	Aug	Sep	Oct	Nov	Dec	Year
Mean daily maximum °F (°C)	60.6 (15.9)	62.3 (16.8)	64.4 (18.0)	67.5 (19.7)	70.1 (21.2)	72.9 (22.7)	73.4 (23.0)	74.3 (23.5)	74.5 (23.6)	71.5 (21.9)	64.9 (18.3)	60.0 (15.6)	68.0 (20.0)
Mean daily minimum °F (°C)	40.8 (4.9)	42.7 (5.9)	44.0 (6.7)	45.5 (7.5)	48.6 (9.2)	51.5 (10.8)	53.7 (12.1)	53.9 (12.2)	52.6 (11.4)	49.0 (9.4)	44.3 (6.8)	40.8 (4.9)	47.3 (8.5)
Average precipitation inches (mm)	6.40 (163)	6.24 (158)	4.67 (119)	1.99 (51)	0.85 (22)	0.19 (4.8)	0.01 (0.25)	0.04 (1.0)	0.27 (6.9)	1.44 (37)	3.75 (95)	5.68 (144)	31.53 (801)
Average precipitation days (≥ 0.01 in)	10.6	10.9	10.0	5.9	3.3	1.3	0.3	0.7	1.5	3.5	7.5	10.7	66.2
Source: NOAA

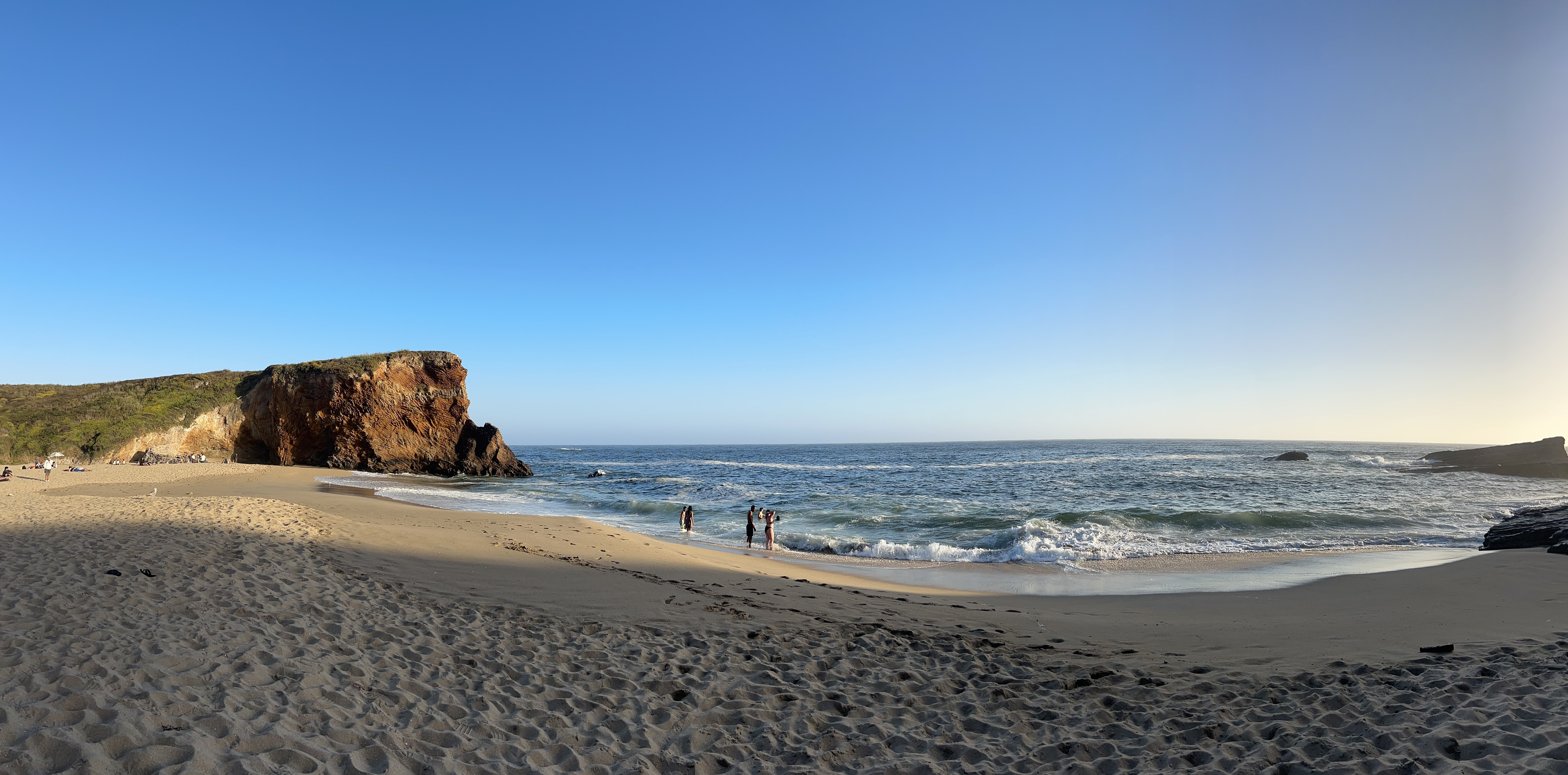
Panther Beach

== Climate change ==
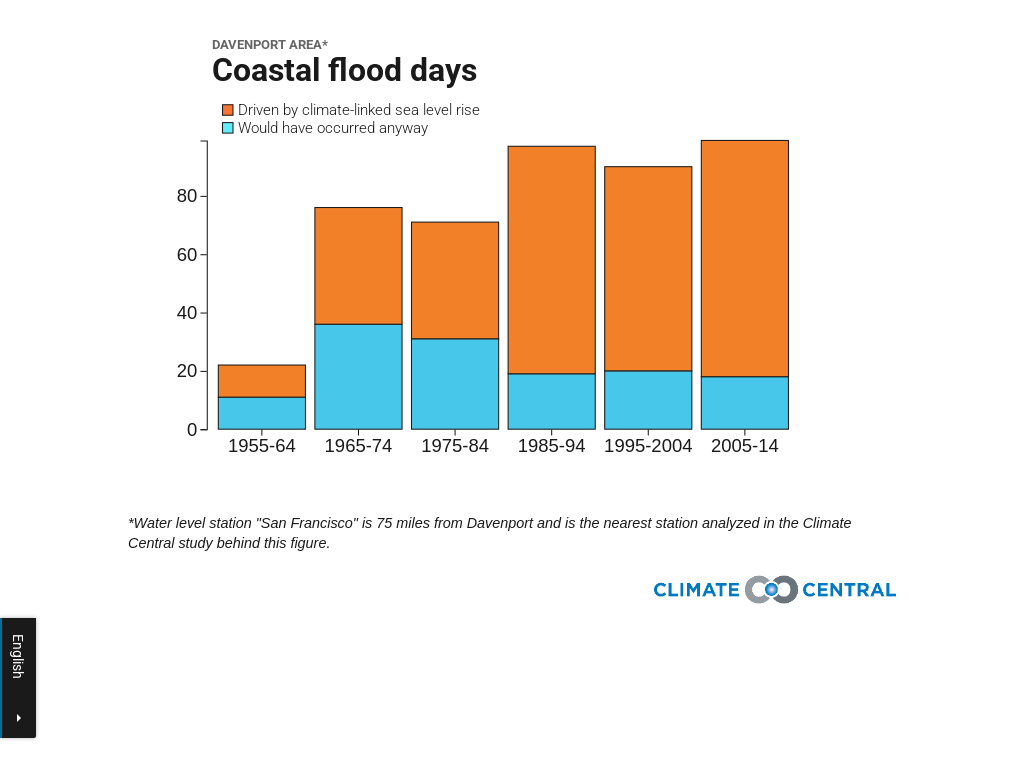
Surging Seas RISK FINDER

Climate change has caused major shifts in Davenport, including surging sea levels, wildfires, poorer air quality, and land erosion. The trapping of greenhouse gases causes climate change: carbon dioxide (CO 2 ), nitrogen dioxide (N 2 O), and methane (CH 4 ), trapping heat in Earth's atmosphere due to longwave radiation. This process, known as the greenhouse effect, was discovered by John Tyndall who identified the greenhouse gases responsible. To combat this, the county of Santa Cruz implemented 2022 Climate Action and Adaptation Plan (CAAP). This plan aimed to mitigate climate change through various policies and strategies to reduce emissions. The plan involves a breakdown of the greenhouse gases (GHG) responsible, setting goals for reducing these emissions, and identifying strategies to meet those goals. There is a 98% calculated risk of a flood of at least 3 feet that could occur between the present day and 2050 in Davenport.

Santa Cruz is a forerunner of Central Coast Community Energy, a movement created by an agency that spans local communities and Southern California. The movement focuses on developing and delivering clean, renewable energy while making it billable. This acts as another incentive to reduce emissions, posing fewer threats to the environment.

== Ecology ==
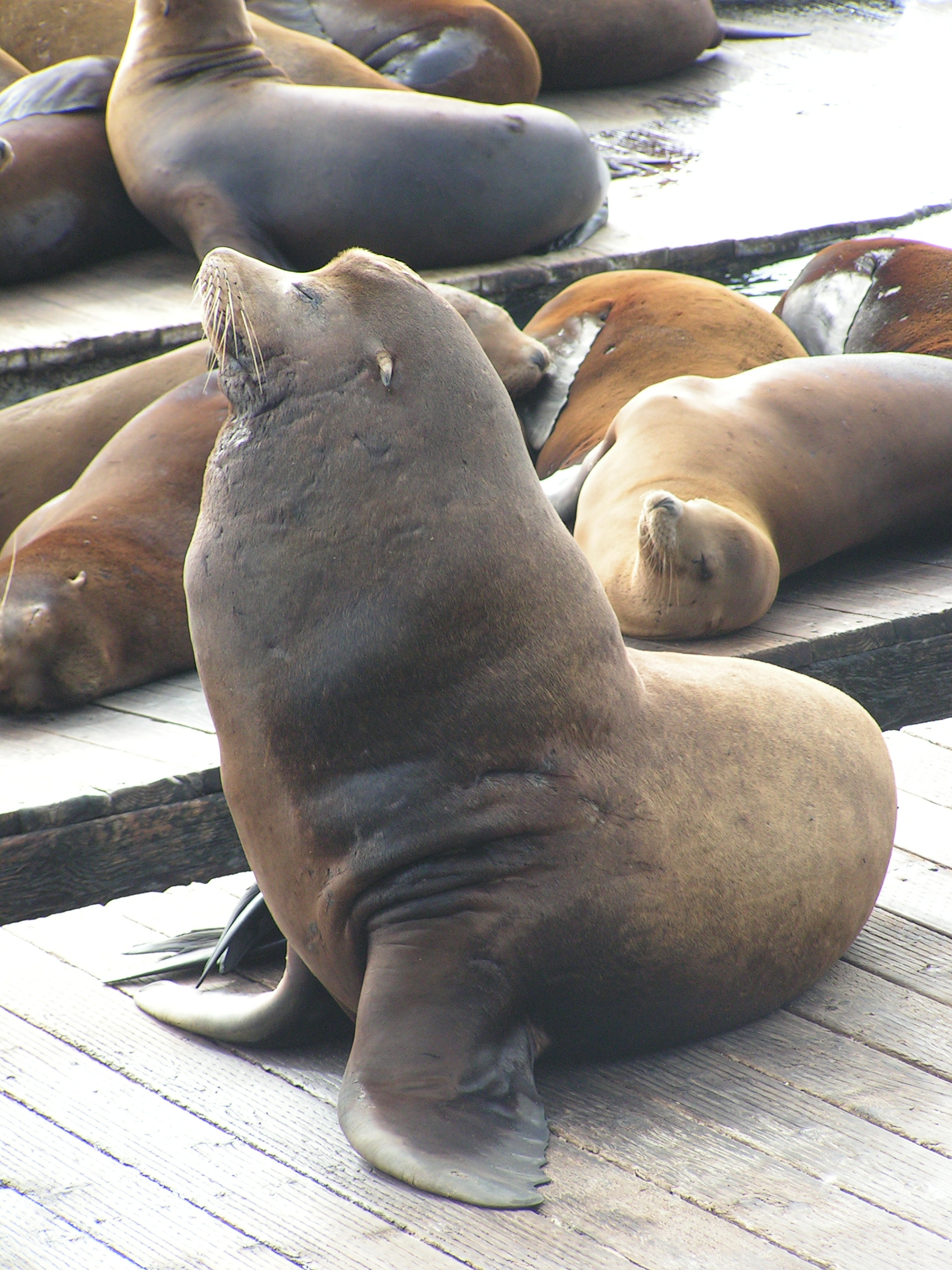
Sea lions (Zalophus californiaus)

Biodiversity in and around Davenport is expansive and varied. Marine mammals include sea lions (Zalophus californiaus), harbor seals (phoca vitulina), and common bottlenose dolphins (Tursiops truncatus). Organisms such as Ochre Sea Stars (Pisaster ochraseus) and Giant Green Anemones (Anthopleura xanthogrammica) populate the many tide pools. Aviary biodiversity includes the Western gull (Larus occidentalis), Surf Scoter (Melanitta perspicillata), Say's Phoebe (Sayornis saya), and Western Palm Warbler (Setophaga palmarum).

Due to a high concentration of residential and agricultural entities, many instances of introduced or invasive flora can be seen, amidst native species such as California Sagebrush (Artemisia californica), Monterey Cyprus (Hesperocyparis macrocarpa), and Seaside Daisy (Erigeron glaucus). An infamous invasive plant is the Tasmanian Blue Gum (Eucalyptus globulus). Cosmopolitan species, and other anthropogenic introductions, include the Sweet Alyssum (Lobularia maritima), Red Valerian (Cetranthus ruber), and Buck's-horn Plantain (Plantago coronopus).

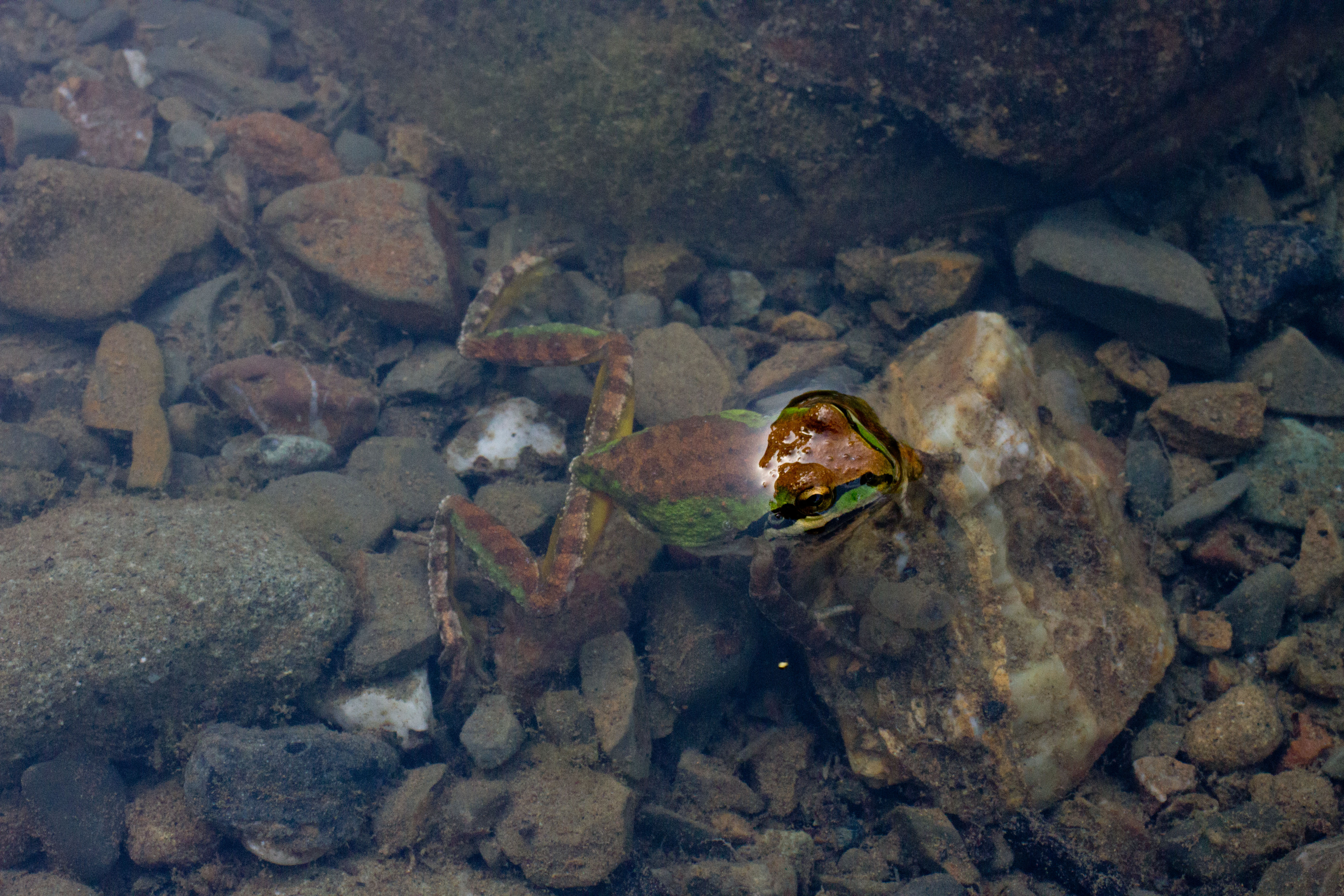
Pacific Chorus Frog

Climate change and other environmental degradation continues to affect the ecosystems of Davenport and other coastal California habitat. Animals found in the foothills, forests, and grasslands of the region include the Mountain Lion (Puma concolor), Pacific Chorus Frog (Pseudacris regilla), and the Anise Swallowtail (Papilio zelicaon) butterfly.

An extensive list of organisms can be found on the Davenport iNaturalist page.

== Demographics ==
Historical population
Census	Pop.	Note	%±
2010	408		—
2020	388		−4.9%
U.S. Decennial Census; 1860–1870 1880-1890; 1900 1910 1920; 1930 1940 1950; 1960 1970 1980; 1990 2000 2010; 2020

Davenport first appeared as a census-designated place in the 2010 United States census.

=== Race and ethnic composition ===
Davenport CDP, California – Racial and ethnic composition Note: the US Census treats Hispanic/Latino as an ethnic category. This table excludes Latinos from the racial categories and assigns them to a separate category. Hispanics/Latinos may be of any race.
Race / Ethnicity (NH = Non-Hispanic)	Pop 2010	Pop 2020	% 2010	% 2020
White alone (NH)	206	204	50.49%	52.58%
Black or African American alone (NH)	6	3	1.47%	0.77%
Native American or Alaska Native alone (NH)	3	2	0.74%	0.52%
Asian alone (NH)	7	2	1.72%	0.52%
Native Hawaiian or Pacific Islander alone (NH)	0	0	0.00%	0.00%
Other race alone (NH)	1	5	0.25%	1.29%
Mixed race or Multiracial (NH)	13	20	3.19%	5.15%
Hispanic or Latino (any race)	172	152	42.16%	39.18%
Total	408	388	100.00%	100.00%

=== 2020 census ===
The 2020 United States census reported that Davenport had a population of 388. The population density was 136.4 inhabitants per square mile (52.7/km^{2}). The racial makeup of Davenport was 243 (62.6%) White, 3 (0.8%) African American, 13 (3.4%) Native American, 3 (0.8%) Asian, 0 (0.0%) Pacific Islander, 53 (13.7%) from other races, and 73 (18.8%) from two or more races. Hispanic or Latino of any race were 152 persons (39.2%).

The census reported that 92.5% of the population lived in households, 7.5% lived in non-institutionalized group quarters, and no one was institutionalized.

There were 121 households, out of which 29 (24.0%) had children under the age of 18 living in them, 54 (44.6%) were married-couple households, 12 (9.9%) were cohabiting couple households, 22 (18.2%) had a female householder with no partner present, and 33 (27.3%) had a male householder with no partner present. 30 households (24.8%) were one person, and 20 (16.5%) were one person aged 65 or older. The average household size was 2.97. There were 72 families (59.5% of all households).

The age distribution was 98 people (25.3%) under the age of 18, 25 people (6.4%) aged 18 to 24, 92 people (23.7%) aged 25 to 44, 108 people (27.8%) aged 45 to 64, and 65 people (16.8%) who were 65 years of age or older. The median age was 40.7 years. For every 100 females, there were 100.0 males.

There were 140 housing units at an average density of 49.2 units per square mile (19.0 units/km^{2}), of which 121 (86.4%) were occupied. Of these, 76 (62.8%) were owner-occupied, and 45 (37.2%) were occupied by renters.

== Notable people ==
- Joe Brovia, professional baseball player
- Valerie Corral, cannabis activist and caregiver
- Olga Najera-Ramirez, anthropologist
- The Gregory Family, serving the Community for over 55 years

== See also ==
- Davenport oral history, (videorecording, series), Community Action Board, (Santa Cruz: Community Television of Santa Cruz County, 1998).
- Awaswas language
- Davenport tide pools
- List of birds of Santa Cruz County, California
- Rancho Agua Puerca y las Trancas, nearby Spanish land grant
