= San Vicente Creek (Santa Cruz County) =

San Vicente Creek Arroyo de San Vicente
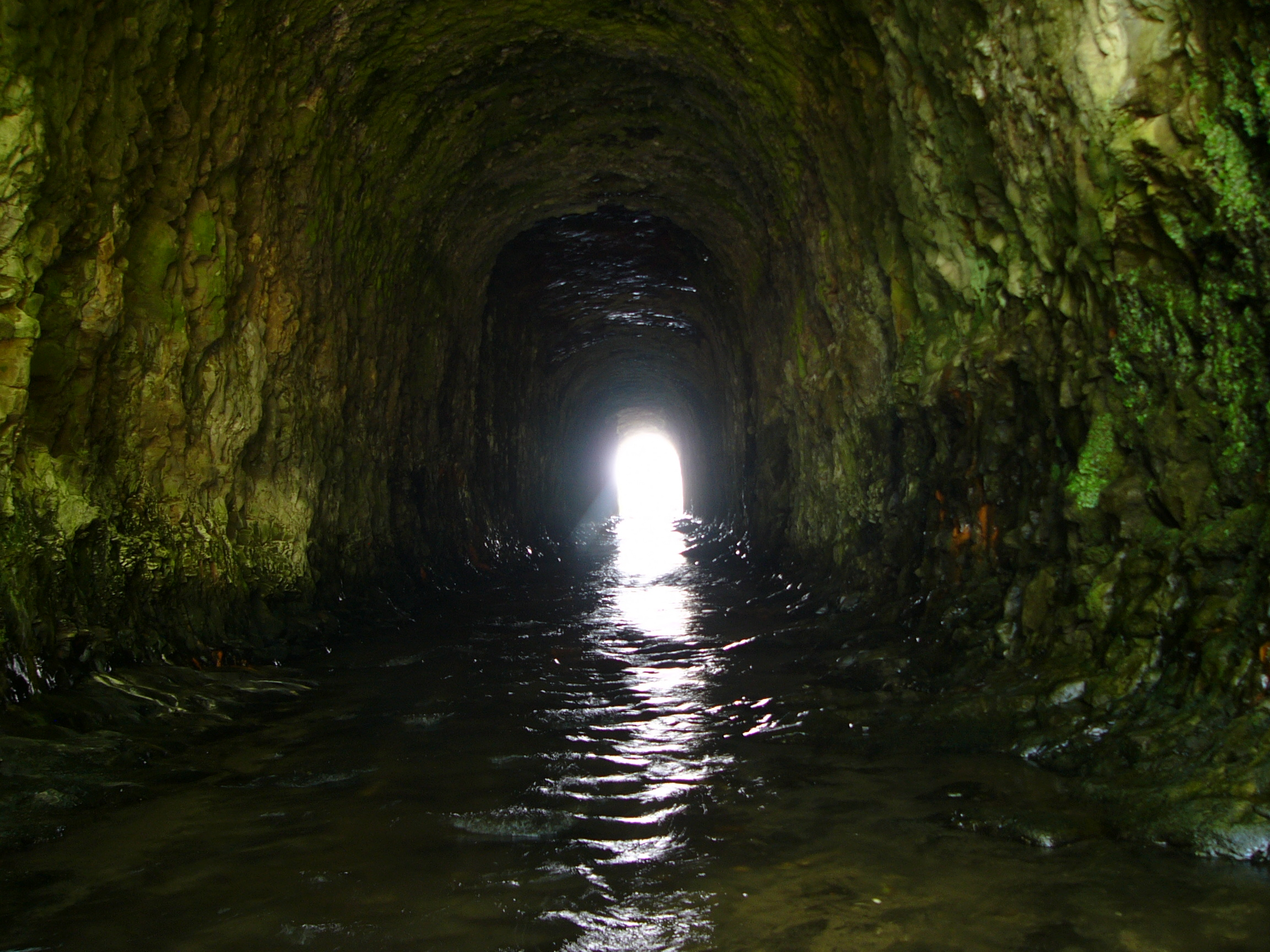
- Tunnel channelling San Vicente Creek beneath coast highway and railway

- Location of the mouth of San Vicente Creek in Davenport, California

Location
- Country: United States
- State: California
- Region: Santa Cruz County
- Municipality: Davenport, California

Physical characteristics
- Source: Ben Lomond Mountain in the Santa Cruz Mountains
  - coordinates: 37°06′35″N 122°08′46″W
  - elevation: 2,520 ft (770 m)
- Mouth: Pacific Ocean
  - location: Davenport, California
  - coordinates: 37°00′34″N 122°11′39″W
  - elevation: 13 ft (4.0 m)

Basin features
- Tributaries
  - left: Mill Creek

San Vicente Creek (Spanish for "St. Vincent") is a 9.3-mile-long (15.0 km) northern California coastal stream which flows entirely within Santa Cruz County. It flows from the Santa Cruz Mountains to the Pacific Ocean.

== History ==
Originally, there was a tidal marsh at the mouth of San Vicente Creek, but this was filled in by a trestle and rampart built by a collaboration between the Ocean Shore Railway and the Southern Pacific Transportation Company in 1906. The creek was redirected through a tunnel blasted into the rock adjacent to its former course.

Prior to this San Vicente had been the premiere trout fishing stream in the county, so the fill caused some outrage in the local papers. A 1906 editorial in the Santa Cruz Surf newspaper at the time said: "The San Vicente Creek, beloved of the angler and the artist, has its mouth stopped by a vast dyke, and its throat choked into a tunnel, a saloon on its border, and its bed for miles denuded of the granite cobbles and sand beds. A sawmill is swiftly cutting out the timber and dirt and debris defile the pools and clog the riffles where lurked the gamey trout."

== Watershed and Course ==
The San Vicente Creek watershed drains 4,500 acres (18 km^{2}). Its waters rise at 2,520 feet (770 m) elevation just north of and below the peak of Ben Lomond Mountain in the Santa Cruz Mountains. The creek descends the west-facing slopes of the mountains, picking up one major tributary, Mill Creek. The creek's mouth is at the unincorporated community of Davenport (which had originally been named after the creek).

== Ecology ==
San Vicente Creek is near the southern boundary of the coho salmon (Oncorhynchus kisutch) Central California Coast evolutionary significant unit (ESU). The removal of an over 100 year old, 30-foot wide dam (9.1 m) on its Mill Creek tributary in 2021 removed an impassable barrier to migrating coho salmon and steelhead trout (Oncorhynchus mykiss). The removal allowed durable limestone cobble, that coho salmon rely on for their nests, called redds, to move downstream. Just one year later, in September 2022, 15 federally endangered coho salmon fry were identified in the Mill Creek tributary, for the first time.

San Vicente Creek watershed is regionally unique due to the amount of karst underlying the upper watershed. This geological formation fosters significant water infiltration and subsurface movement, resulting in multiple freshwater springs that provide unusually cool summer water temperatures and high summer baseflows ideal for survival of young oversummering salmonids.

== See also ==
- List of rivers of California
