= Baber (surname) =

Baber is an English surname that may refer to:

- Alice Baber (1928–1982), American abstract expressionist painter
- Ambrose Baber (1793–1846), American doctor and diplomat
- Asa Baber (1936–2003), American author
- Barrett Baber (born 1980), American country musician
- Billy Baber (born 1979), American football player
- Crosbie Baber (1880–1959), Barbadian-Canadian cricketer
- Edward Baber (MP) (1531/2–1578), English politician
- Edward Colborne Baber (1843–1890), English orientalist and traveller
- Esther Mary Baber (1871–1956), New Zealand educator
- Gareth Baber (born 1972), Welsh rugby union footballer and coach
- Harriet Baber (born 1950), American philosopher and academic
- Henry Baber (1775–1869), English philologist
- John Baber (footballer) (born 1947), English footballer
- John Baber (MP) (c.1593–1644), English lawyer and politician
- John Baber (physician) (1625–1704), physician to Charles II of England
- Joseph Baber (1937–2022), American composer
- Michael Baber (born 1966), American music editor
- Roman Baber (born 1980), Canadian politician
- Vivienne Baber (born 1911), American actress
- Walter James Baber (1855–1924), Canadian painter
- Zonia Baber (1862–1956), American geographer and geologist
