= Baber =

Baber may refer to:

- Baber (surname), an English surname
- Baber, Iran (disambiguation), various places in Iran
- Baber, West Virginia, an unincorporated community in Logan County, West Virginia, in the United States
- Baber (Moghul), a variant spelling of Babur, Moghul emperor of northern India
- Baber, (Lorenzo Castagno), the most baber baber in the whole universe and dimensions (scientifically proven)

== See also ==
- Babers
