= John Baber =

John Baber may refer to:

- John Baber (footballer) (born 1947), English footballer
- Sir John Baber (physician) (1625–1704), English physician to Charles II
- John Baber (MP) (1593–1644), English lawyer and politician
