= Tipperary =

Tipperary is the name of:

== Places ==
- County Tipperary, a county in Ireland
  - North Tipperary, a former administrative county based in Nenagh
  - South Tipperary, a former administrative county based in Clonmel
- Tipperary (town), County Tipperary's namesake town
- New Tipperary, an area built in the late 19th century for people who had been evicted from Tipperary town
- Tipperary Hill, an Irish district in Syracuse, New York, noted for its inverted traffic signal
- Tipperary Park, a park in New Westminster, Canada
- Tipperary Station, a cattle station in the Northern Territory of Australia
- The Tipperary, a historic pub in London, England

=== Parliamentary constituencies ===
- County Tipperary (Parliament of Ireland constituency) (before 1801)
- County Tipperary (UK Parliament constituency) (1801–1885)
- North Tipperary (UK Parliament constituency) (1885–1922)
- Tipperary Mid, North and South (1921–1923)
- Tipperary (Dáil constituency) (1923–1948, 2016–2024)
- Tipperary North (Dáil constituency) (1948–2016, 2024– )
- Tipperary South (Dáil constituency) (1948–2016, 2024– )

== Songs ==
- "It's a Long Way to Tipperary"
- "Tipperary" (song)
- "I'm Leaving Tipperary", composed by Pat White, sung by the Irish Rovers and others
- "Tipperary" by Nellie McKay on Pretty Little Head

== Others ==
- HMS Tipperary, a Faulknor-class flotilla leader.
- Tipperary Crystal, a manufacturer of lead crystal and other glass in the Irish county
- Tipperary GAA, a sporting association
- "Tipperary", a soliloquy by philosopher George Santayana in his 1922 work Soliloquies in England and Later Soliloquies
