= Edward Baber =

Edward Baber may refer to:

- Edward Baber (MP) (1532–1578), British MP
- Edward Ambrose Baber (1793–1846), American doctor and diplomat
- Edward Colborne Baber (1843–1890), English orientalist
