= Boise Buckskins =

- 1978; Boise, Idaho

Minor league affiliations
- Class: Class A Short Season
- League: Northwest League
- Division: South

Major league affiliations
- Team: Independent

Team data
- Colors: Brown, white
- Ballpark: Borah Field (now Wigle Field)
- Owner/ Operator: Lanny Moss

The Boise Buckskins were a minor league baseball team located in Boise, Idaho. They were members of the Class A-Short Season Northwest League (NWL) for a single season in 1978.

== History ==
Following the departure of the Boise A's to Medicine Hat, Alberta, after the 1976 season, Boise went without professional baseball in 1977. Lanny Moss, who had gained notoriety as the 27-year-old female general manager of the Portland Mavericks, was awarded ownership of an expansion franchise in the Northwest League. Without an affiliation with a major league team, the Buckskins operated as an independent and in a unique financial strategy, Moss attempted a sponsorship program. Rather than sponsoring the Buckskins club, businesses and community members would sponsor individual players for $3,000. The sponsorship concept was based on a roster of roughly twenty players.

The Buckskins debuted against the Salem Senators and recorded the franchise’s first win in an 11–3 victory. Unfortunately, most of the headlines made by the Buckskins weren’t related to their on field performance. Manager Gerry Craft gained national media attention regarding divine guidance that prompted him to release a player. Moreover, the Bucks added former Milwaukee Brewer Danny Thomas, the sixth overall selection from the 1972 draft, to their roster. Thomas, earned the nickname "Sundown Kid" as he refused to play from sundown Friday to sundown Saturday in adherence with his religious beliefs, which ended his career with the Brewers. In fifty-four games, Thomas led Boise with eleven home runs and a batting average of .359, but quit before the end of the season after not receiving his paycheck.

By the final weeks of the season, the Buckskins were playing without pay, as low attendance severely impacted the club's finances; they finished last in the eight-team NWL at 23–49 (.319). The team was plagued by low attendance and a player sponsorship plan that failed to meet projections. Despite the club being on the verge of bankruptcy, Moss was determined to return the following season. Ultimately the franchise ceased operations.

The City of Trees went without professional baseball until the 1987 season, the first for the Hawks.

== Ballpark ==
Home games were played at Borah Field (now Bill Wigle Field) on the campus of Borah High School. Also the home of the Boise A's (1975, 1976) and Hawks for their first two seasons (1987, 1988), the ballpark is still in use today for high school and American Legion play.

== Season record ==
Season	PDC	Division	Finish	Wins	Losses	Win%	Postseason	Manager	Attendance
Boise Buckskins
1978		South	3rd	23	49	.319		Gerry Craft	23,126
