= Babers =

Babers is a surname. Notable people with the surname include:

- Alonzo Babers (born 1961), American athlete
- Dino Babers (born 1961), American football coach
- Henry Babers (born 1957), American Christian evangelist
- Rod Babers, American football cornerback

== See also ==
- Baber (disambiguation)
