= Walter James Baber =

English-Canadian painter

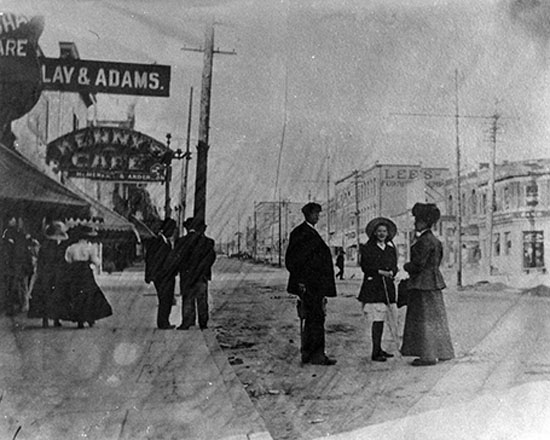
- Walter James Baber, his wife Edith, and their daughter Elsie on Columbia Street in New Westminster, British Columbia, c.1910.
- Born: 24 August 1855; Knightsbridge, Middlesex, United Kingdom
- Died: 18 October 1924 (aged 69); New Westminster, British Columbia, Canada
- Movement: Realism

Walter James Baber (24 August 1855 – 18 October 1924) was an English-Canadian artist who is best known for painting landscapes in watercolour. Although he previously worked as an artist in England and Europe, Baber is most associated with his views of British Columbia, stemming from his residence at New Westminster for over twenty years.

== Biography ==
Walter James Baber was born in Knightsbridge within London on 24 August 1855. The family business was a floorcloth factory, handed down some time after 1798 to his great-grandfather James Baber, and descending to his father, also named James Baber. His father was additionally a painter. Little is known of Walter's early life, but by 1881 he was working as an artist while living in Croydon, Surrey. During the 1880s, he painted scenes in Wales, Switzerland, and Venice.

In 1897, Baber, with his wife Edith and son Malcolm, emigrated to Canada, their destination being Victoria in British Columbia. On arrival, believing that living on an island would be a disadvantage, they settled on the mainland. Their initial residence was in Burnaby, on Tenth Avenue opposite the present site of New Westminster Secondary School, just across the boundary from New Westminster. Here their daughter Elsie was born. In 1902, they moved to Fifth Street in New Westminster proper, remaining in the same location until his death. Baber took trips up the Fraser River on the Ramona sternwheeler, explored the surrounding forest trails, and travelled to the mountains in the vicinity. Few artists during this period in British Columbia were able to make a living solely by their art, (Note: A forerunner and contemporary of Baber was Tomhu Huron Roberts (1853 - 1938), who from 1889 to 1910 was the only artist listed in Vancouver city directories.) and it is known that he taught students privately. Baber died as the result of a stroke on 18 October 1924 in New Westminster. His daughter Elsie inherited many oils and watercolours by her father, displaying them in her home on Second Street in the neighbourhood of Queen's Park, described as "a veritable treasure house".

== Art and legacy ==
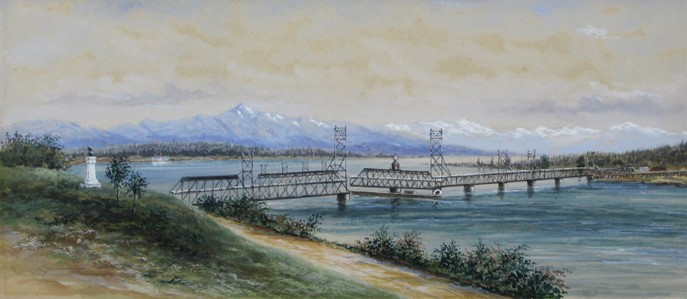
New Westminster Bridge. 1912-1924.

While Baber practiced oil painting, he is remembered more for his preferred medium of watercolours. His subjects were usually landscapes along with occasional city views. The settings were primarily in British Columbia, particularly in the Lower Mainland and on the Pacific coast. Other locations included Alberta, the United Kingdom, and Europe. A prolific artist, his depictions were sought after by area residents, and were still being framed regularly three decades after his death.

In 1958, his paintings were featured in an exhibition with a New Westminster theme, blending both past and present artworks, in a joint project by St. Hilda's Guild of Holy Trinity Cathedral and the British Columbia Centennial committee. In 1978, eight of his watercolours were exhibited at the Uno Langmann Gallery in Vancouver. Two years later, a selection of his oils and watercolours were shown at the New Westminster Public Library. In 2000, four of his works were displayed at the Vancouver Maritime Museum. In 2023, his painting B.C. Lake appeared in an exhibition of watercolours at the Petley Jones Gallery in Vancouver.

Baber's paintings are in the collections of the Vancouver Art Gallery (12 works), the British Columbia Archives (6 works), the City of Vancouver Archives (6 works), the Vancouver Maritime Museum (5 works), and the University of Victoria Legacy Art Galleries (3 works). A record price of $1,400 CAD for one of his watercolours was achieved in 2024 for The Narrows, Stanley Park.
