= New Westminster =

City in British Columbia, Canada

- City
- City of New Westminster
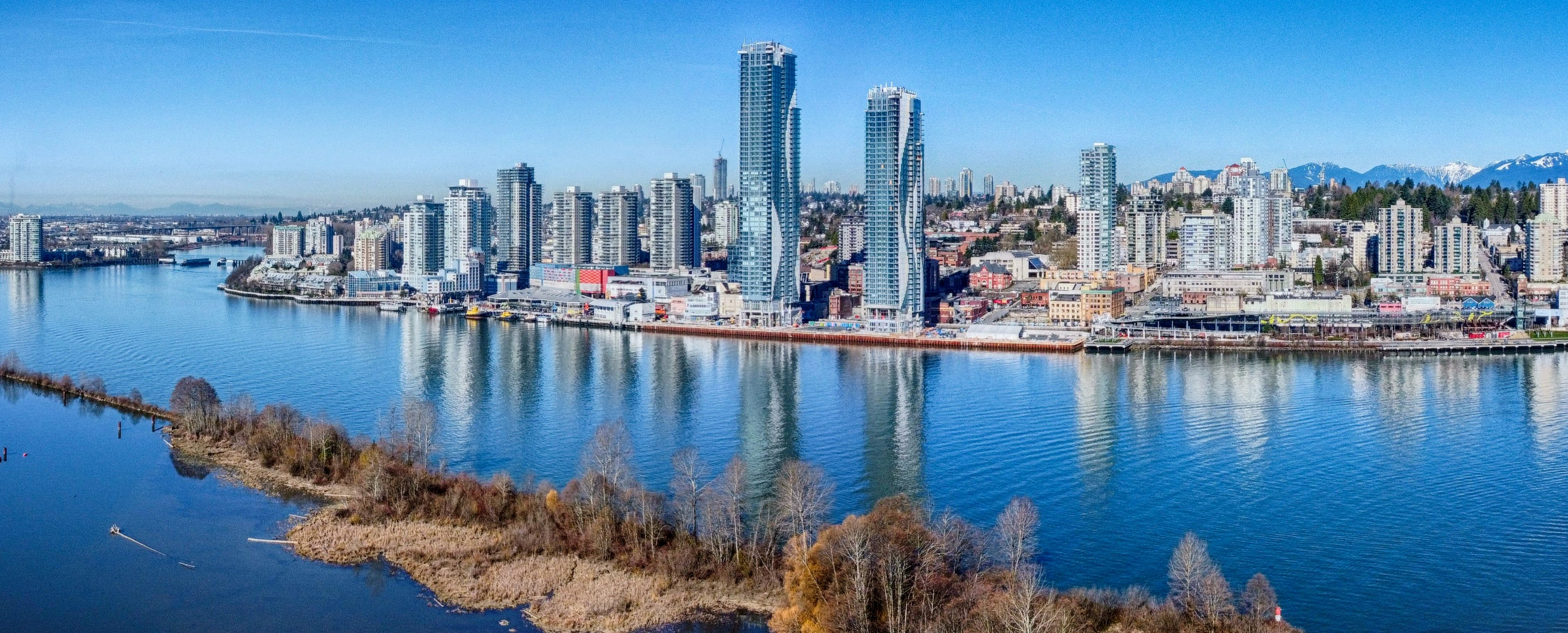
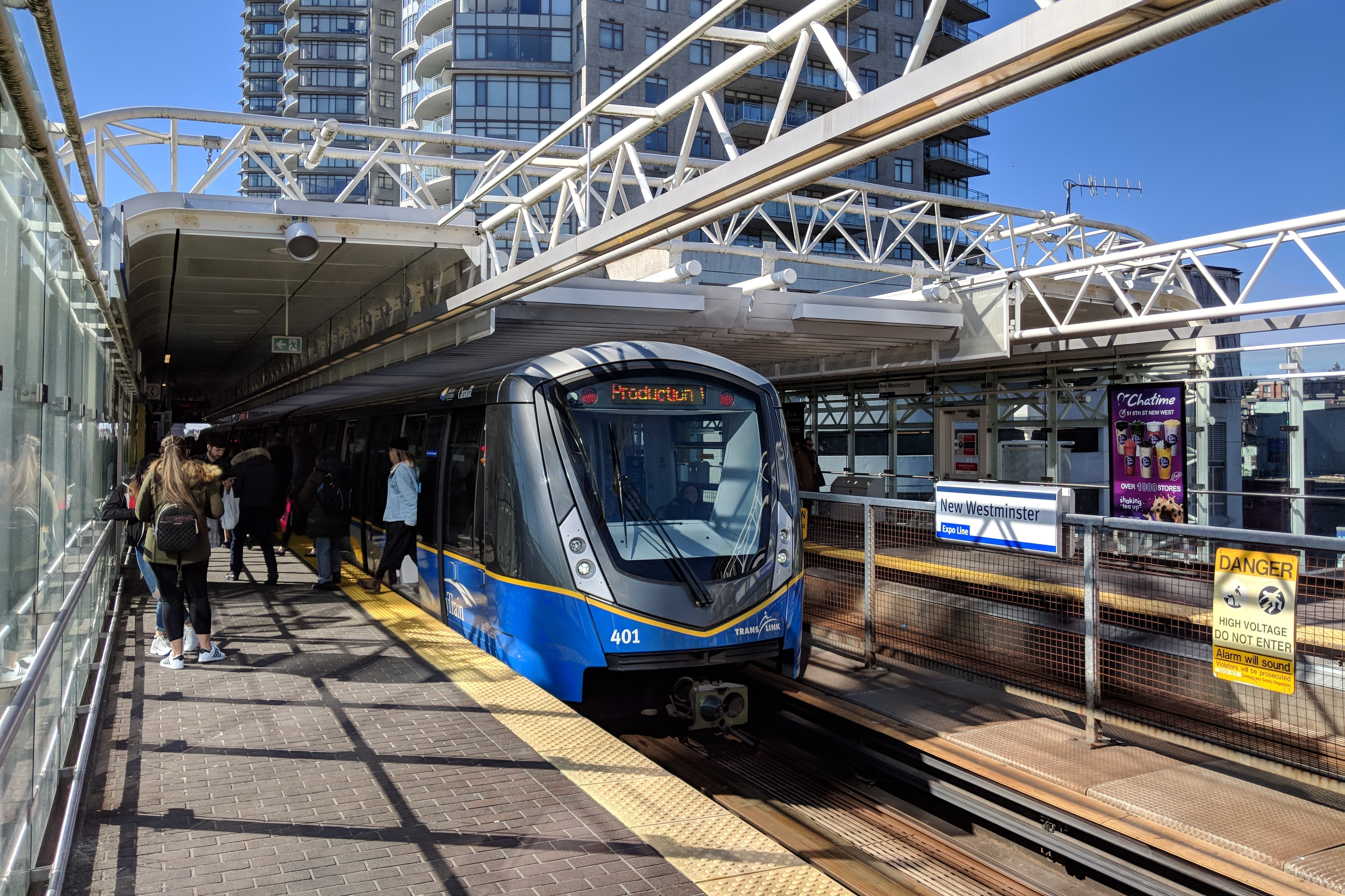
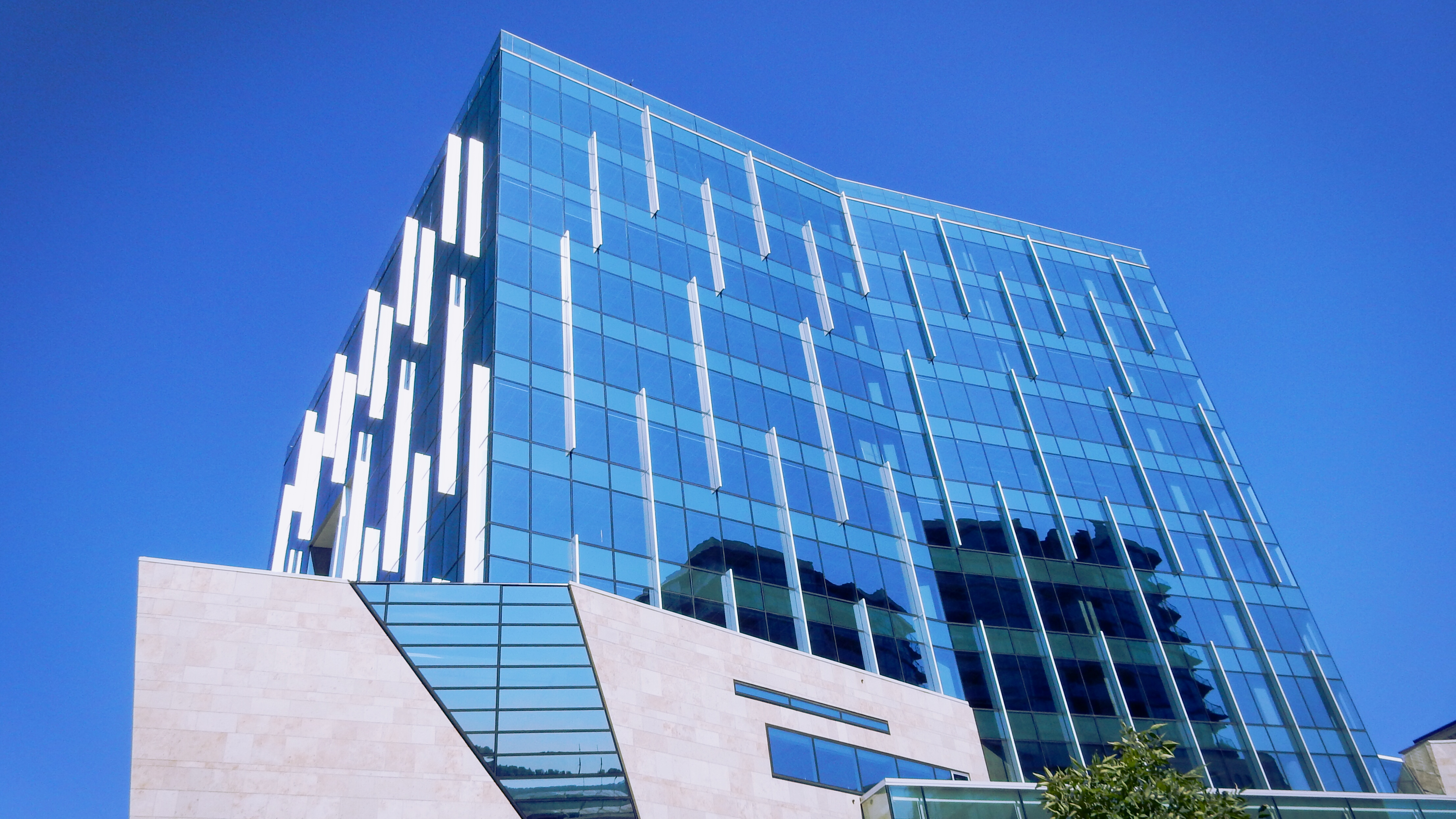
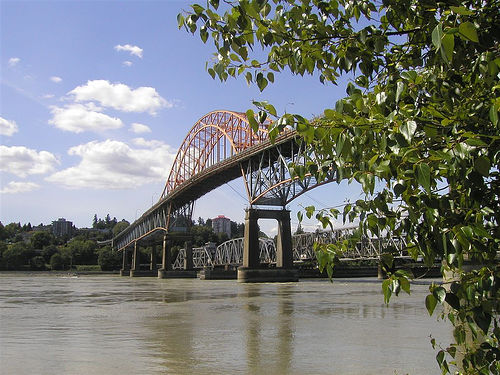
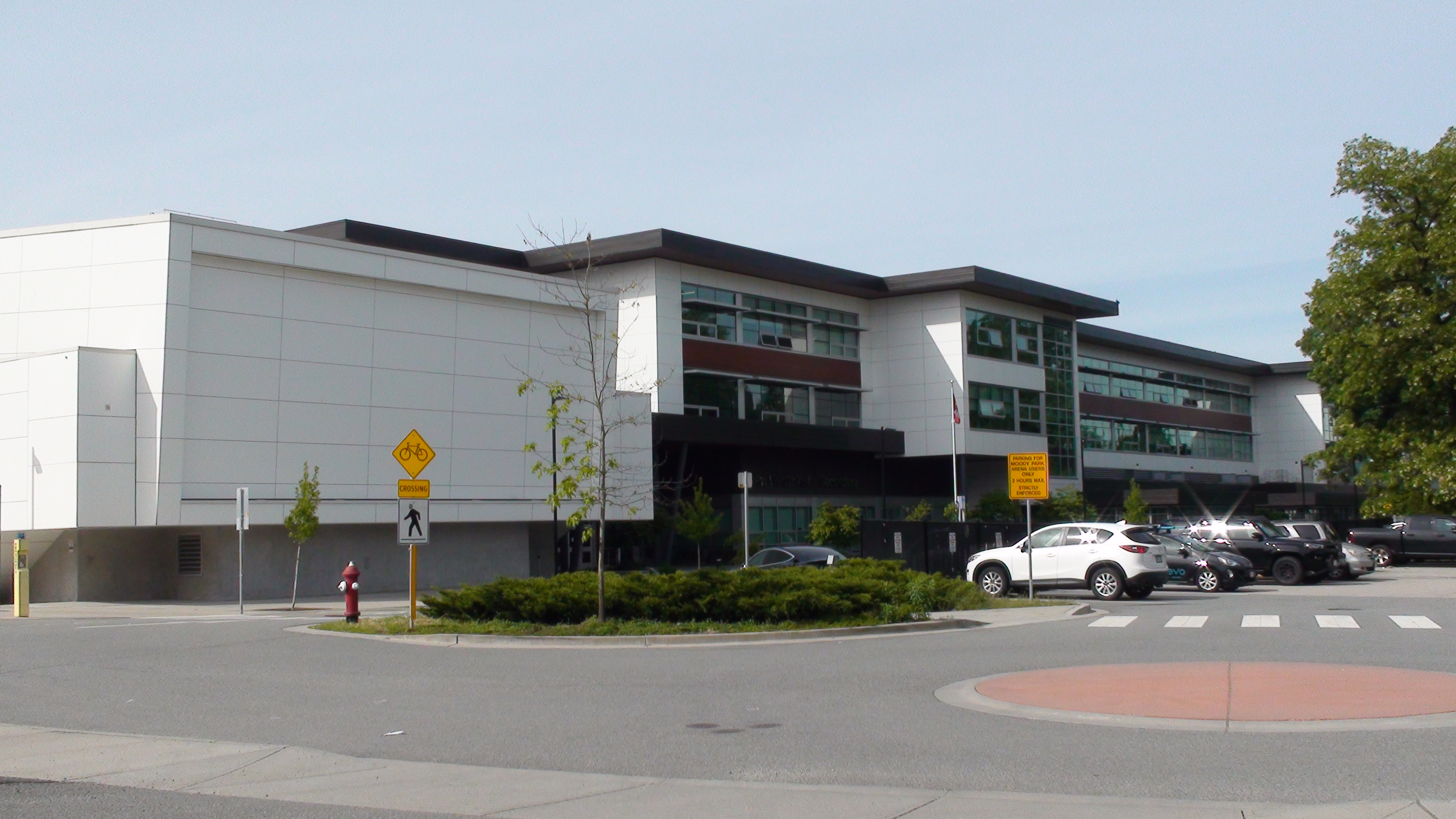
- From top, left to right: New Westminster skyline; SkyTrain Expo Line; Anvil Centre; Pattullo Bridge; New Westminster Secondary School

- Flag Coat of arms Logo
- Nickname: "New West"
- Location of New Westminster in Metro Vancouver
- Coordinates: 49°12′25″N 122°54′40″W
- Country: Canada
- Province: British Columbia
- Regional district: Metro Vancouver
- Founded: 1858
- Renamed: July 20, 1859
- Incorporated: July 16, 1860
- Founder: Richard Clement Moody
- Named for: City of Westminster

Government
  - Type: Mayor-council government
  - Body: New Westminster City Council
  - Mayor: Daniel Fontaine
  - Councillors: Ken Armstrong; Karima Budhwani; Rick Folka; Tasha Henderson; Paul Minhas; Maryann Morrison
  - MP: Jake Sawatzky (Lib.)
  - MLA: Raj Chouhan (NDP); Steve Kooner (Con.); Jennifer Whiteside (NDP)

Area
  - Total: 16.03 km^{2} (6.19 sq mi)
  - Land: 15.62 km^{2} (6.03 sq mi)
- Elevation: 60 m (200 ft)

Population (2021)
  - Total: 78,916
  - Estimate (2023): 88,945
  - Density: 5,052.4/km^{2} (13,086/sq mi)
  - Private Dwellings: 37,737
- Time zone: UTC−07:00 (Pacific Time)
- Forward sortation area: V3L – V3M
- Area codes: 604, 778, 236, 672
- Website: newwestcity.ca

New Westminster (colloquially known as New West) is a city in the Lower Mainland region of British Columbia, Canada, and a member municipality of the Metro Vancouver Regional District.

It was founded in 1858 by Richard Clement Moody as the capital of the Colony of British Columbia, and served as such until the mainland and Vancouver Island colonies were merged to form the new Colony of British Columbia in 1866. It was the British Columbia mainland's largest city from its foundation until the first decade of the 20th century, when it was surpassed in population by Vancouver.

It is located on the banks of the Fraser River as it turns southwest towards its estuary, on the southwest side of the Burrard Peninsula and roughly at the centre of the Greater Vancouver region.

== History ==
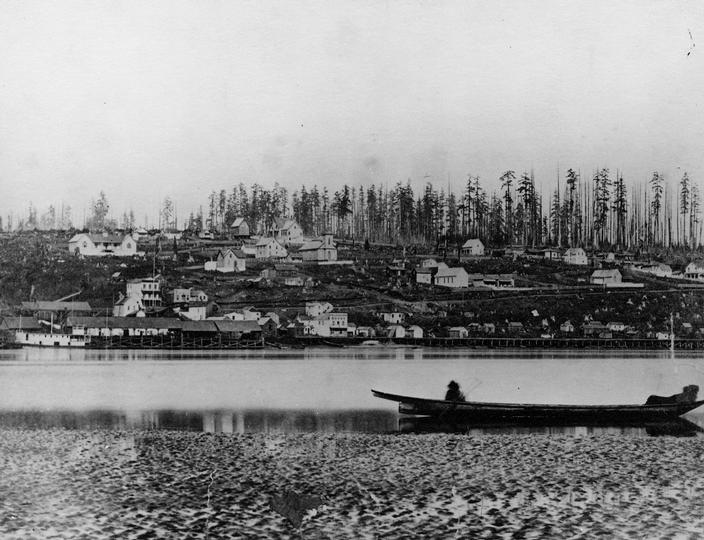
A view of New Westminster from the Fraser River, c. 1865

The area now known as New Westminster was originally inhabited by Kwantlen First Nation. The discovery of gold in BC and the arrival of gold seekers from the south prompted fear amongst the settlers that Americans might invade to take over the area.

Richard Clement Moody, a colonel, arrived in British Columbia in December 1858, at the head of the Royal Engineers, Columbia Detachment, having been hand picked to 'found a second England on the shores of the Pacific' and to transform the new colony into the British Empire's 'bulwark in the farthest west'. Moody "wanted to build a city of beauty in the wilderness" and planned his city as an iconic visual metaphor for British dominance, "styled and located with the objective of reinforcing the authority of the Crown and of the robe". Subsequent to the enactment of the Pre-emption Act of 1860, Moody settled the Lower Mainland and selected the site and founded the new capital, New Westminster. Moody and the Royal Engineers were trained in settlement and selected the site because of its defensibility: it was farther from the American border than the site of the colony's proclamation, Fort Langley, possessed "great facilities for communication by water, as well as by future great trunk railways into the interior", and possessed an excellent port. Moody was also struck by the majestic beauty of the site, writing in his letter to Blackwood:

The entrance to the Fraser is very striking—Extending miles to the right & left are low marsh lands (apparently of very rich qualities) & yet fr [sic] the Background of Superb Mountains—Swiss in outline, dark in woods, grandly towering into the clouds there is a sublimity that deeply impresses you. Everything is large and magnificent, worthy of the entrance to the Queen of England's dominions on the Pacific mainland. [...] My imagination converted the silent marshes into Cuyp-like pictures of horses and cattle lazily fattening in rich meadows in a glowing sunset. [...] The water of the deep clear Frazer was of a glassy stillness, not a ripple before us, except when a fish rose to the surface or broods of wild ducks fluttered away.

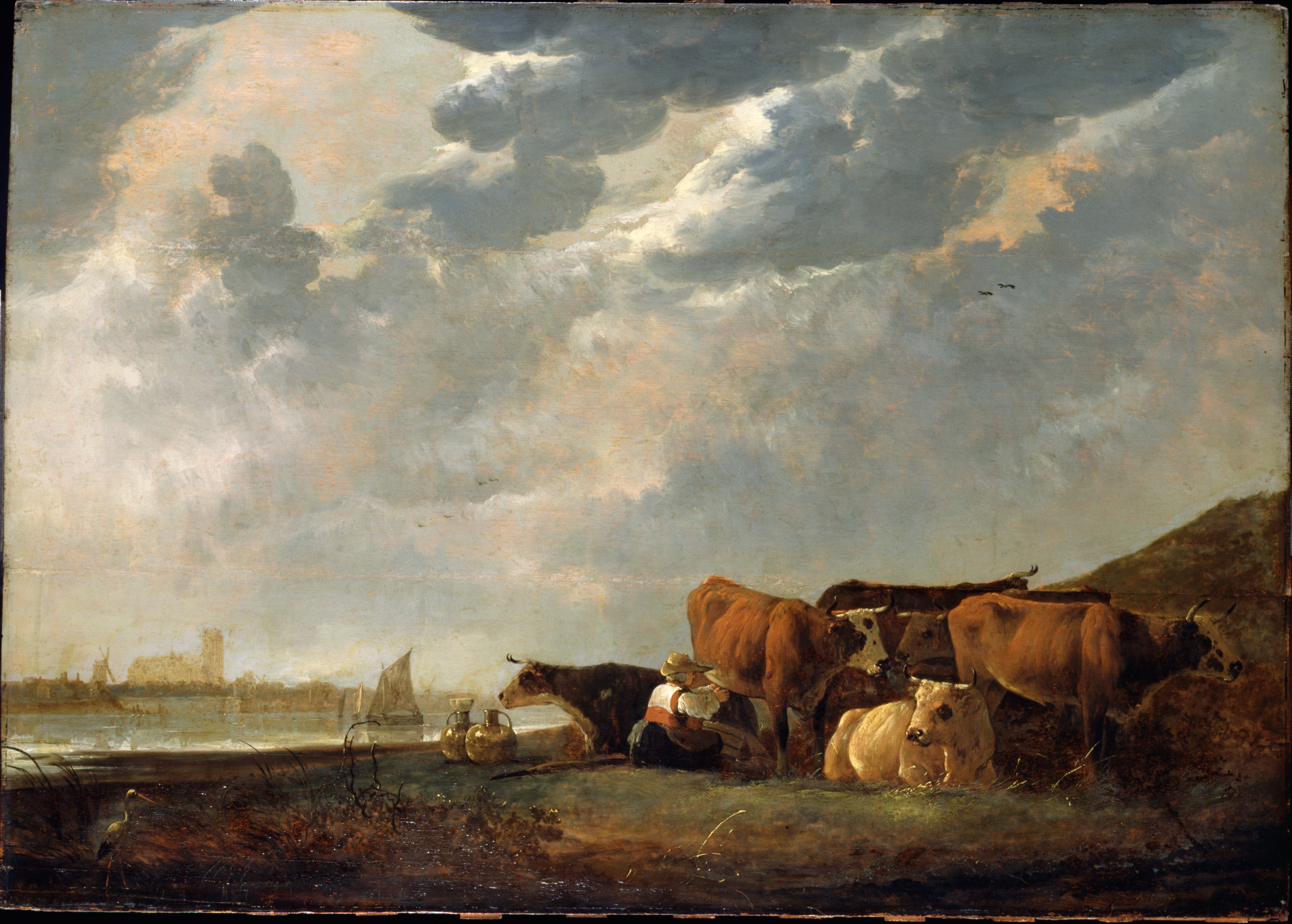
Moody likened his vision of the nascent Colony of British Columbia to the pastoral scenes painted by Aelbert Cuyp.

It was suggested by Moody and the Royal Engineers, Columbia Detachment that the site be proclaimed "Queensborough". Governor James Douglas proclaimed the new capital with this name on February 14, 1859. The name "Queensborough", however, did not appeal to London and it was Queen Victoria who named the city after Westminster, that part of the British capital of London where the Parliament Buildings were, and are to this day, situated. From this naming by the Queen, the City gained its official nickname, "the Royal City". A year later New Westminster became the first City in British Columbia to be incorporated and have an elected municipal government. It became a major outfitting point for prospectors coming to the Fraser Gold Rush, as all travel to the goldfield ports of Yale and Port Douglas was by steamboat or canoe up the Fraser River.

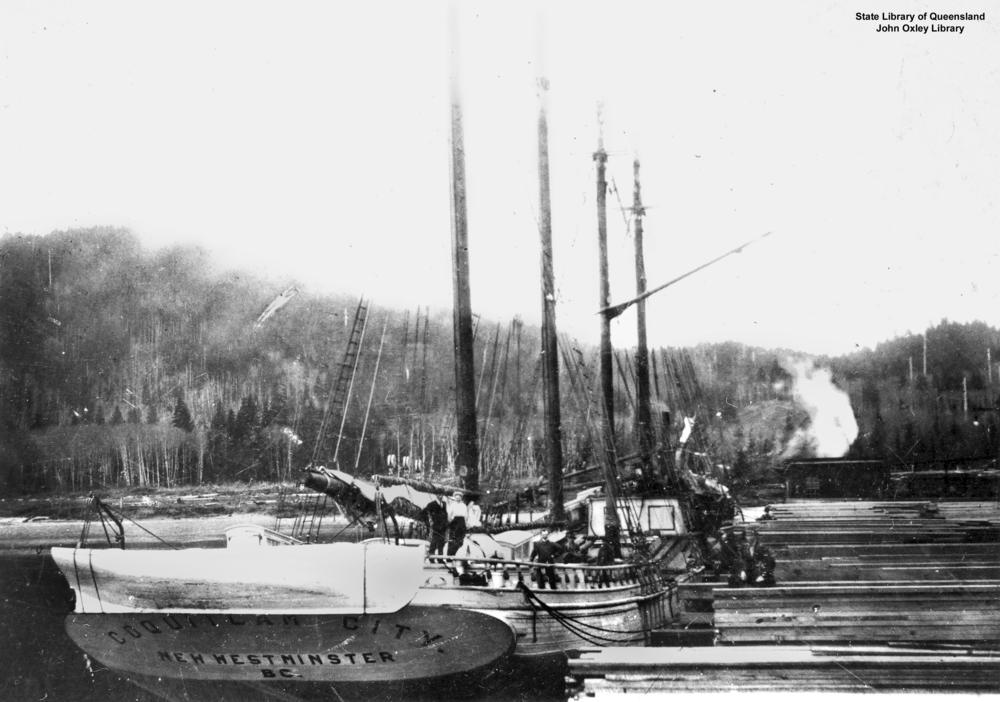
Coquitlam City, of New Westminster

However, Colonial Office secretary Edward Bulwer-Lytton "forgot the practicalities of paying for clearing and developing the site and the town" and the efforts of Moody's engineers were continuously hampered by insufficient funds, which, together with the continuous opposition of Douglas, "made it impossible for [Moody's] design to be fulfilled".

Governor Douglas spent little time in New Westminster and had little affection for the city; and the feelings were amply repaid by the citizens of New Westminster, who avidly supported Moody's city-building efforts and castigated the governor, who preferred to remain for the most part isolated in distant Victoria. In contrast to Victoria, where settlers from England had established a strong British presence, New Westminster's early citizens were largely Canadians and Maritimers, who brought a more business-oriented approach to commerce and dismissed the pretensions of the older community. Despite being granted a municipal council, the mainlanders in New Westminster also pressed for a legislative assembly to be created for British Columbia, and were infuriated when Governor Douglas granted free port status to Victoria, which stifled the economic growth of the Fraser River city. Moreover, to pay for the expense of building roads into the Interior of the colony, Douglas imposed duties on imports into New Westminster.

In 1866, the Colony of British Columbia and the Colony of Vancouver Island were united as "British Columbia". However, the capital of the Colony of Vancouver Island, Victoria, was made the capital of the newly amalgamated Colony of British Columbia following a vote in the House of Assembly. On the day of the vote, one member of the assembly, William Cox (one of the colony's Gold Commissioners and a Victoria supporter), shuffled the pages of the speech that William Franklyn from Nanaimo (a New Westminster supporter) intended to give, so that Franklyn lost his place and read the first paragraph three times. Cox then popped the lenses of Franklyn's glasses from their frames so that the Nanaimo representative could see nothing at all of his speech. After a recess to settle the resulting uproar and allow the member from Nanaimo a chance to sort out his speaking notes and his spectacles, the Speaker John Sebastian Helmcken (from Victoria) refused to allow Franklyn a "second" chance to speak. The subsequent vote was 13 to 8 against New Westminster.

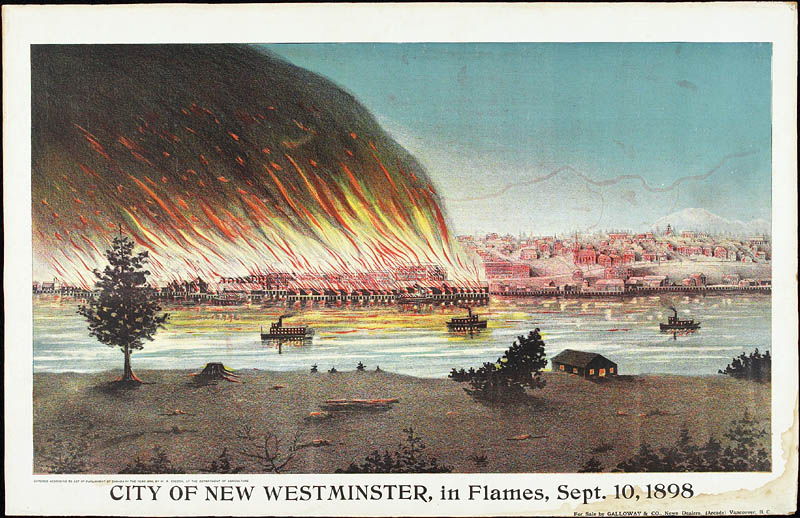
City of New Westminster in flames, September 10, 1898

With the entry of British Columbia into the Dominion of Canada in 1871, as the sixth province, New Westminster's economic prospects improved, but the Royal City would lose out again, this time to the new railway terminus town of Vancouver, when the Canadian Pacific Railway was extended to the shores of Burrard Inlet, even though a spur of the railway did reach New Westminster in 1886.

In 1898, a fire destroyed downtown New Westminster, and in 1916 the federal government shut down the "common" reserves set aside for Coastal First Nations people who visited New Westminster during the fishing season. In 1916 the remaining land on Poplar Island was turned over to the BC government.

From 1927 to 1969, the British Columbia Shore Station Oceanographic Program was collecting coastal water temperature and salinity measurements from New Westminster every day for the Department of Fisheries and Oceans.

In 1991, the New Westminster Armoury was recognized as a Federal Heritage building on the Register of the Government of Canada Heritage Buildings. Along with the rest of the Greater Vancouver region, in 2020 New Westminster experienced the worst air quality in the world due to the combined effects of the 2020 Western American wildfires and a fire at the old Pier at the quay.

In 2022, efforts were made within the city to phase-out the "Royal City" moniker and undergo a rebrand of the city's logo and mottos. The citys logo was rebranded on June 9, 2025.

== Geography ==
New Westminster is located on the Burrard Peninsula, mainly on the north bank of the Fraser River. It is 19 kilometres (12 mi) southeast of the City of Vancouver proper, adjacent to Burnaby and Coquitlam and across the Fraser River from Surrey and Delta. A portion of New Westminster called Queensborough is located on the eastern tip of Lulu Island, adjacent to Richmond. The total land area is 15.62 square kilometres (6.03 mi^{2}).

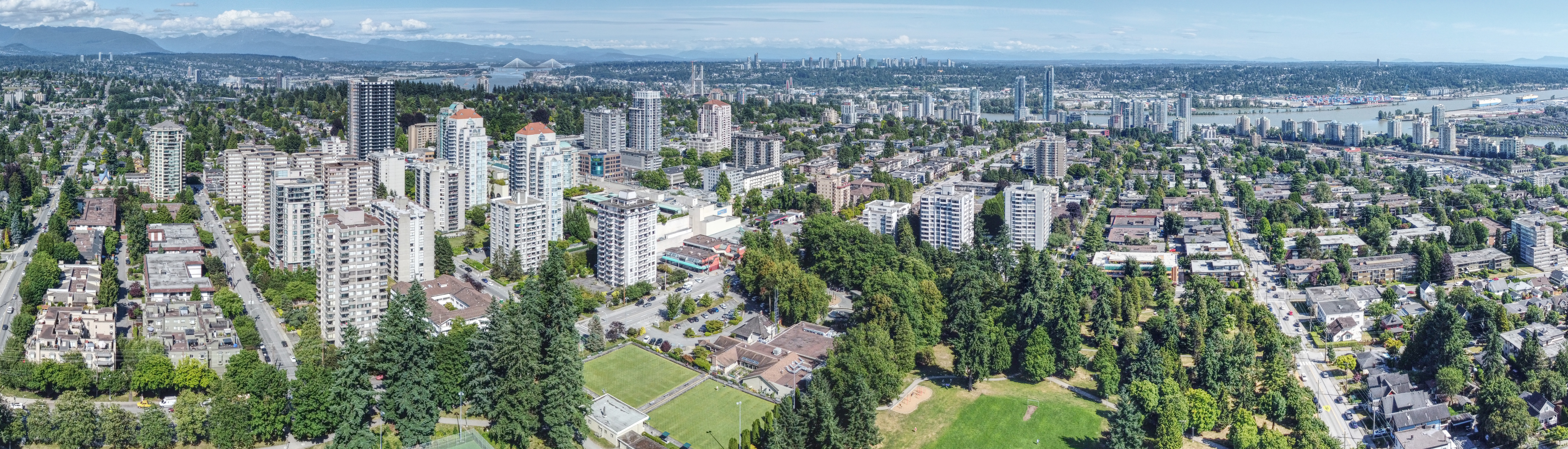
Aerial view of New Westminster from Uptown, looking east towards the Fraser River and Surrey City Centre

=== Historical urban geography ===
New Westminster has changed markedly over time and by the results of its incorporation into the wider urbanization of the Lower Mainland. (See also: Architecture of Greater Vancouver.)

==== BC Penitentiary ====
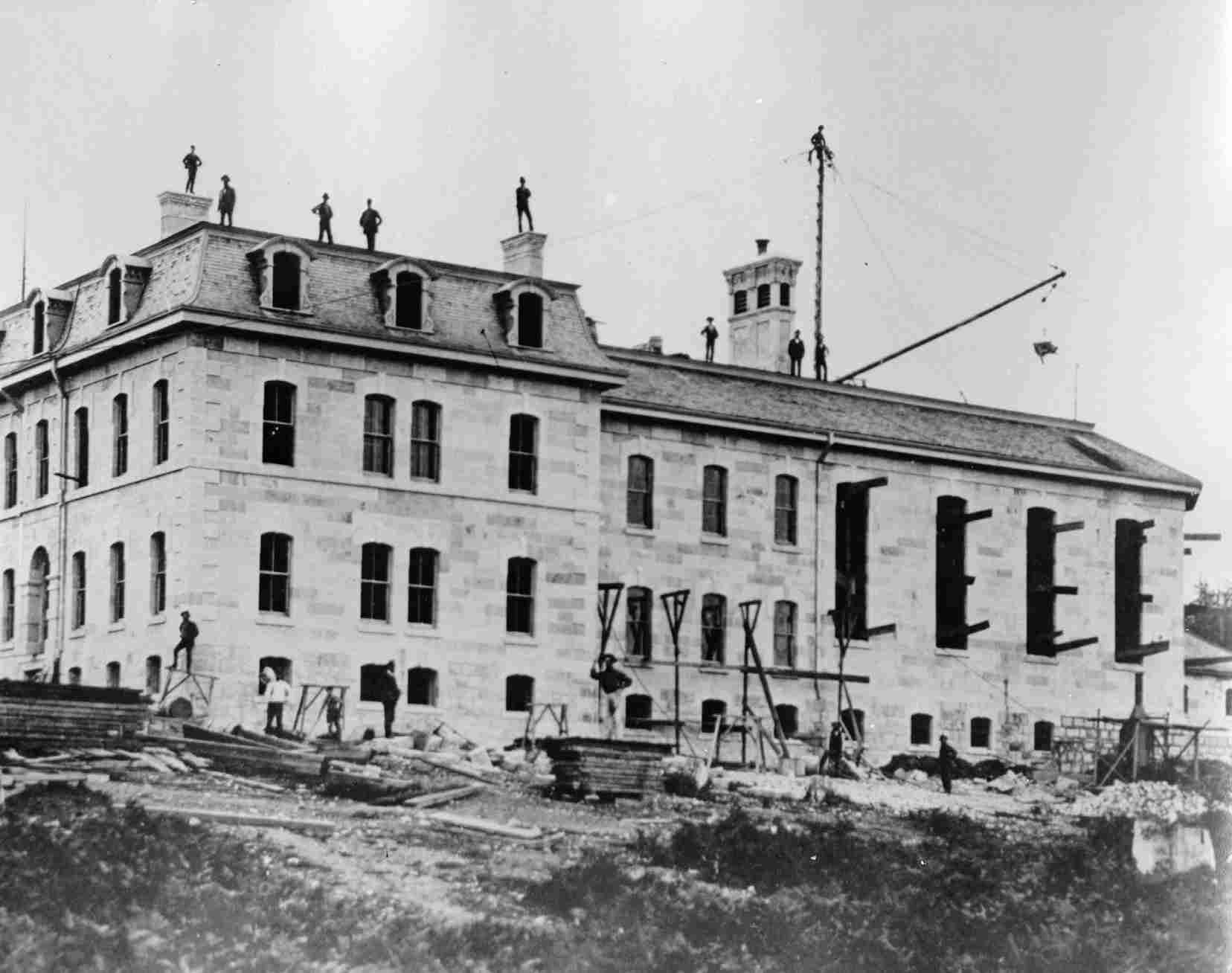
The BC Penitentiary being constructed c. 1877

In 1878, the Government of Canada opened the British Columbia Penitentiary, the first federal penitentiary west of Manitoba. "BC Pen", or simply "the Pen", as it was known (and also in old days as the "skookum house" in the English-Chinook Jargon patois common in early BC), was located between the Sapperton neighbourhood and what is now Queen's Park. It housed maximum-security prisoners for the next 102 years, closing in 1980. The original centre block of the Pen still stands and has been converted into offices. The Gatehouse, steps leading up to it and old Coal House still stand. The rest of the Pen's grounds have been filled with newly built townhouses and condominiums and parkland. Below the main complex on the waterfront the prison's old armoury still stands as part of a new waterfront park; this was also the location of the prison's wharf which was much-used when steamboat was the main means of transportation within the Lower Mainland and for some years after.

==== Woodlands ====
The mental hospital for children, was located to the west of the BC Pen and was adjacent to the offramps of the Pattullo Bridge. After it was closed, the derelict main building was, except for the tower entrance, destroyed by fire on July 9, 2008. In October 2011, all remaining old structures were levelled and cleared, to the joy of some former residents who had bad memories of their childhood experiences.

==== Chinatown ====
New Westminster's Chinatown was one of the earliest established in the mainland colony and initially the second-largest after Victoria's. Prior to the rise of Vancouver's Chinatown it was the largest on the mainland following Barkerville's wane as a centre of population.

It was located along Front Street. A second Chinatown opened in an area known as "The Swamp" at the southwestern edge of downtown, bounded roughly by Royal Avenue, Columbia Street, and 8th and 12th Streets. The "Swamp" name is because area was then boggy ground of low value for the stone and brick buildings of the main part of downtown up Columbia Street to the northeast; and also close to the river and the railway.

Chinatown was destroyed in the Great Fire of 1898 and only partly rebuilt afterwards, with a church and cultural and community events hall the first to be started.

==== Columbia Street ====
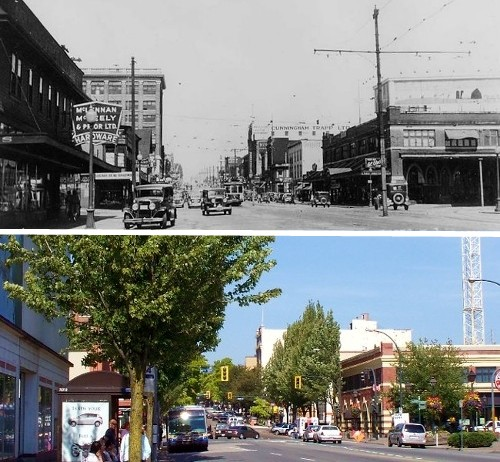
Contrasting views of Columbia Street in 1932 and 2008

Until the 1964 completion of the Highway 1 freeway, which bypassed New Westminster to its north, Columbia Street, the downtown core of New Westminster close to the city's waterfront, was the main commercial retail and service centre for the Fraser Valley and nearby areas of Burnaby and Coquitlam. Known as "the golden mile", it hosted major department stores such as Eaton's, Kresge's and Woolworths as well as long-established New Westminster retailers. This was a time when road travel to Vancouver remained distant for Valley communities, and daily interurban rail service to and from Chilliwack was still in place (the service ended in 1950). The quality of shops was such that even Vancouverites would make the trip by interurban rail or, later on, via Kingsway (originally called the Westminster Highway or Westminster Road), to shop on Columbia Street. In addition to the retailers, Columbia Street was home to major movie houses, the Columbia and the Paramount, rivalling in size and quality to those on Vancouver's Theatre Row. The freeway and the building of suburban malls with free parking is generally conceded to have "killed" Columbia Street, which fell into a slump despite the building of a large parkade above nearby Front Street in the 50s and 60s. Department stores (other than the Army and Navy) left downtown as the Uptown area continued to develop to become New Westminster's main retail and services centre. In October 2006, Columbia Street underwent reconstruction to change to one lane in both directions, with a bike lane and reverse angle parking. This was done to encourage more foot and bicycle traffic. Major high-rise or renovation projects are completed or nearing completion. By May 2012, these include the Plaza 88 development which includes three condominium towers, the complete renovation of the Columbia which is now a cabaret style theatre for concerts, weddings and fundraisers, and the home of Lafflines Comedy Club. The new $25 million Westminster Pier Park officially opened on June 16, 2012, and a new civic centre and office tower named The Anvil Centre on Columbia Street at Begbie Street completed in September 2014. The Salient Group built a tower on top of the Trapp + Holbrook buildings (while restoring the facade) and another condominium called Northbank was built at the east entrance of Columbia Street. Close to the Trapp building, a major fire razed the E.L. Lewis Building and the Hamley Block on October 13, 2013, displacing 30 businesses and destroying a chunk of Columbia Street's historical character. One of the most well-known of these businesses was Copp's Shoes, which had not changed between its 1925 opening and its closure in early 2013.

==== Connaught Heights ====
The westernmost neighbourhood in the city, Connaught Heights, began life as District Lot 172 after the Royal Engineers surveyed the land in the 1860s. In 1892, when the official civic boundaries for New Westminster were set, they only included its original city and suburban lots, thus leaving District Lot 172 disincorporated. The City of Burnaby also chose not to incorporate District Lot 172 when its official civic boundaries were set, resulting in the area being outside any municipal jurisdiction.

In 1911, the original landowner subdivided the land into residential lots that followed the grid established by neighbouring New Westminster; the first residential home had only been built a year prior. In 1912, the BC Electric Railway took advantage of this by building the "Connaught Hill" station at Tenth Avenue for the new interurban electric tramway, which connected New Westminster with Vancouver. The station was named for Prince Arthur, Duke of Connaught and Strathearn. This station became the namesake for the neighbourhood, while the modern SkyTrain tracks follow the path of this historic tramway.

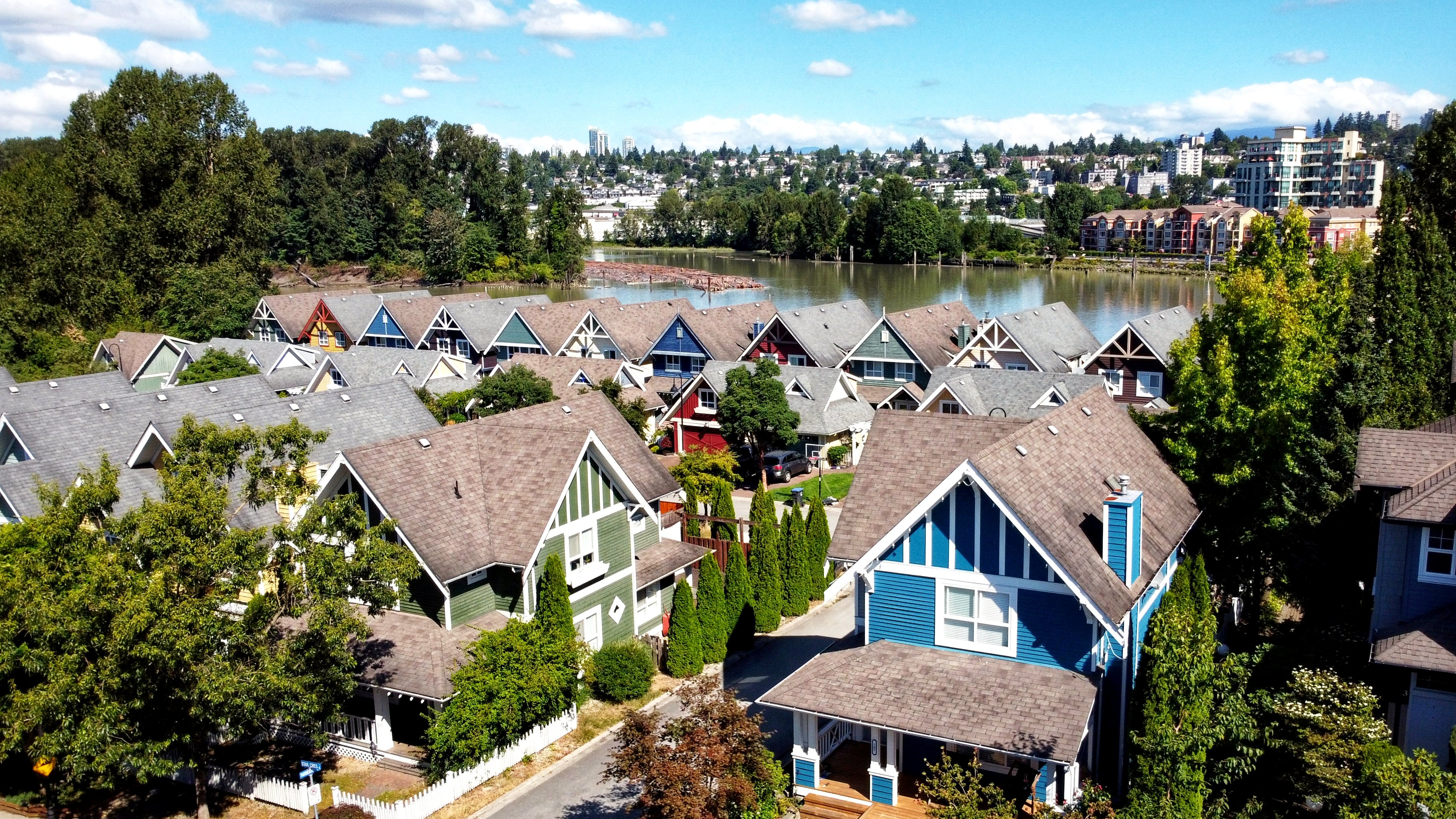
Residences in New Westminster near the Fraser River in 2020

Initially, the provincial government neglected the district, but as the density of residents increased so did the quality of amenities and civic services. In 1939, when there were approximately 200 homes, funding was secured to improve the water and electric services under the Municipality Improvements Assistance Act 1938. Before the improvements, District Lot 172 was designated as Connaught Heights Waterworks District under the Water Act. Following these improvements, land was set aside for a school and parksite. By the 1950s, the notion of incorporating Connaught Heights Waterworks District into New Westminster became more commonplace. In 1960, the construction of the Queensborough Bridge resulted in the demolition of property in Connaught Heights Waterworks District, showing further interaction between the city and district. The first of two referendums to vote on incorporating Connaught Heights Waterworks District into the City of New Westminster was held in 1961, which failed to achieve enough positive votes to proceed with incorporation. Construction of Connaught Heights Elementary School was completed in 1963, and the school was opened and joined the New Westminster School District the following year. A second referendum was held in 1964, which garnered enough positive votes to make Connaught Heights Waterworks District part of New Westminster. By 1965, the amalgamation was officially complete, with Connaught Heights becoming the newest neighbourhood in New Westminster.

==== Front Street ====
Originally a dockside street and market, and also the location of the original Chinatown, Front Street was converted into a truck-route bypass and elevated parkade during the 1960s in an effort to provide increased parking for adjacent Columbia Street. In recent decades it has been the focus of the city's thriving antiques and second-hand trade, which is also concentrated on 12 Street. It has also been used as a location in feature films such as Rumble in the Bronx (substituting for the Bronx), I, Robot (as a futuristic Chicago), Shooter (doubling for Philadelphia, with the Fraser River being the Delaware River), and New Moon. In early 2016, a partial demolition of the parkade commenced as part of the City's continued efforts to revitalize and improve their waterfront area.

==== Government House ====
The original colonial Government House was located approximately where Royal City Manor is now. It was originally occupied by Richard Clement Moody, who commanded the Columbia Detachment of Royal Engineers who established the city. Rarely used by Governor Douglas, its first full-time viceregal resident was Governor Frederick Seymour.

==== New Westminster Canadian Pacific Railway Station ====
A former Canadian Pacific Railway station is adjacent to the New Westminster Skytrain station. It is a two-storey asymmetrical red brick building with steeply pitched bellcast roofs. The building, which was built in 1899, is a classic example of CPR's signature Château-styled railway stations. In 1911, two wings were added to the station, and in 1973, the ageing train station was converted into a branch of The Keg restaurant chain. In 2013, however, the restaurant closed its doors to the public due to structural issues surrounding the then-114-year-old structure. As of 2023, the train station is occupied by Kelly O'Bryan's, a BC Irish restaurant and pub chain.

==== Queensborough ====
Queensborough was the name originally chosen for the colonial capital by Royal Engineer commander Colonel Richard Clement Moody. When Queen Victoria designated New Westminster instead as her new capital's name, the name Queensborough became applied to New Westminster's portion of Lulu Island, across the north arm of the Fraser from the southern end of the city. Queensborough is today a growing housing area with its own distinct identity. Some new condominium complexes have been built adjacent to the Westminster Quay development. In Chinook Jargon, "Koonspa", an adaptation of the name Queensborough, is the usual name for New Westminster as a whole.

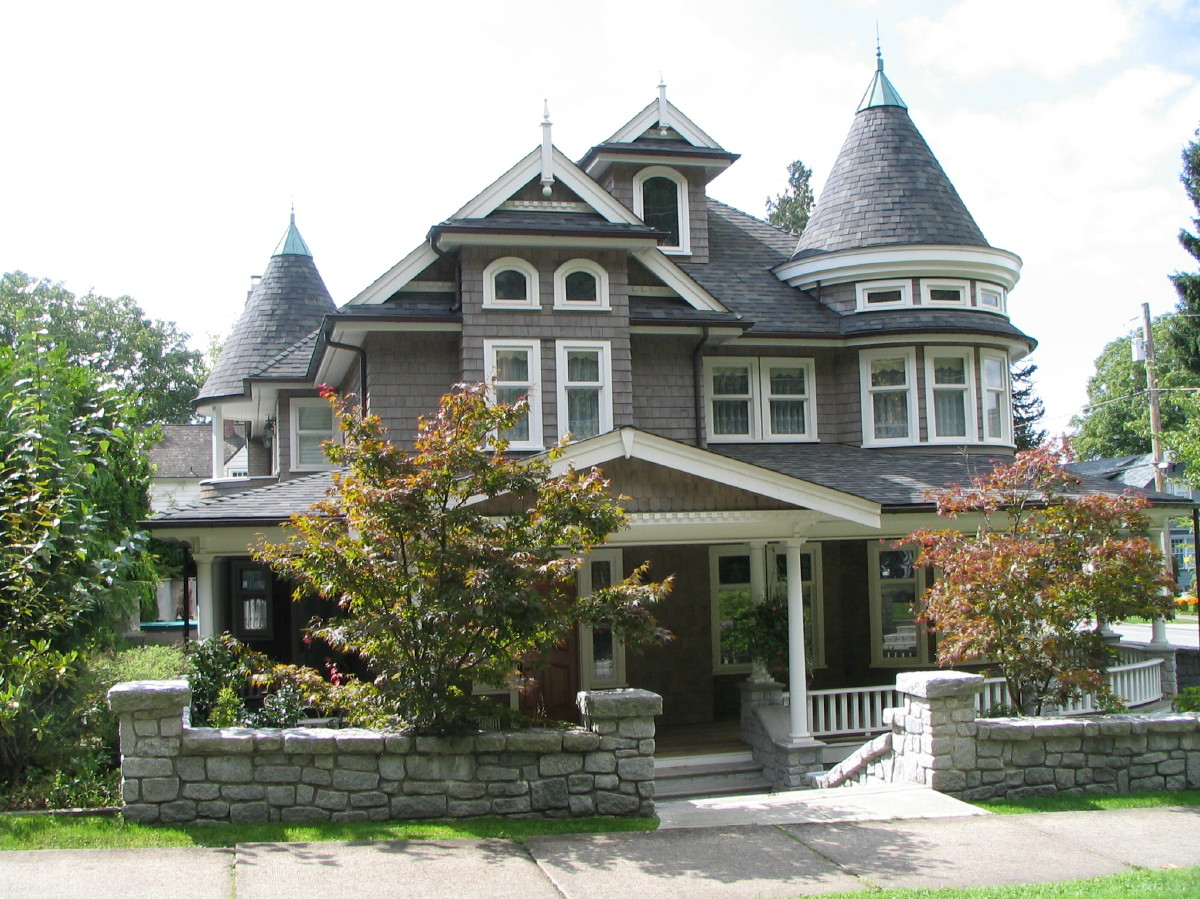
A replica of a Queen Anne house opposite Queens Park

==== Sapperton ====
Sapperton was originally a "suburb" of New Westminster, named for the Columbia Detachment of Royal Engineers ("Sappers"), whose camp was on the hill now occupied by the Fraserview neighbourhood. It is the location of the historic Fraser Cemetery, which rivals Victoria's Ross Bay Cemetery for the number of historically significant graves and monuments. Sapperton is the home of the first commercial brewery to operate in British Columbia known as the "City Brewery". Over the years the brewery changed hands and was operated by Labatts until it closed in 2005. In its place is a recent condo development known as the "Brewery District", although there is no brewery on the premises. New Westminster does have two breweries currently. One is named Steel & Oak which opened its doors in 2014 and is situated on the other end of the Westminster Quay. The other brewery in New Westminster is named Another Beer Co and it is located in Sapperton, close to where the Labatts Brewery was in the Brewery District, since 2019. Also located in Sapperton are the Royal Columbian Hospital, Sapperton Station, Braid Station, and the TransLink (British Columbia) headquarters.

==== Uptown "6th and 6th" ====
Development of an uptown commercial area around 6th Street and 6th Avenue started in 1954, with the opening of Woodward's department store. Added momentum came with the relocation of the public library from downtown to uptown in 1958. In 1992 Woodward's was expanded and modernized into a shopping centre and took the name Woodwards Place. With the bankruptcy of Woodward's in 1993, the name of the centre was changed to Royal City Centre Mall. Moody Park is an important recreational area in the uptown area.

==== West End ====
Opposite Sapperton's north end, New Westminster's West End was once fairly separate from the city proper, and has a neighbourhood commercial node along 12th Street and 20th Street approximately between London Street and Eighth Ave. The 12th Street area features antique and one-of-a-kind stores.

==== Westminster Quay ====
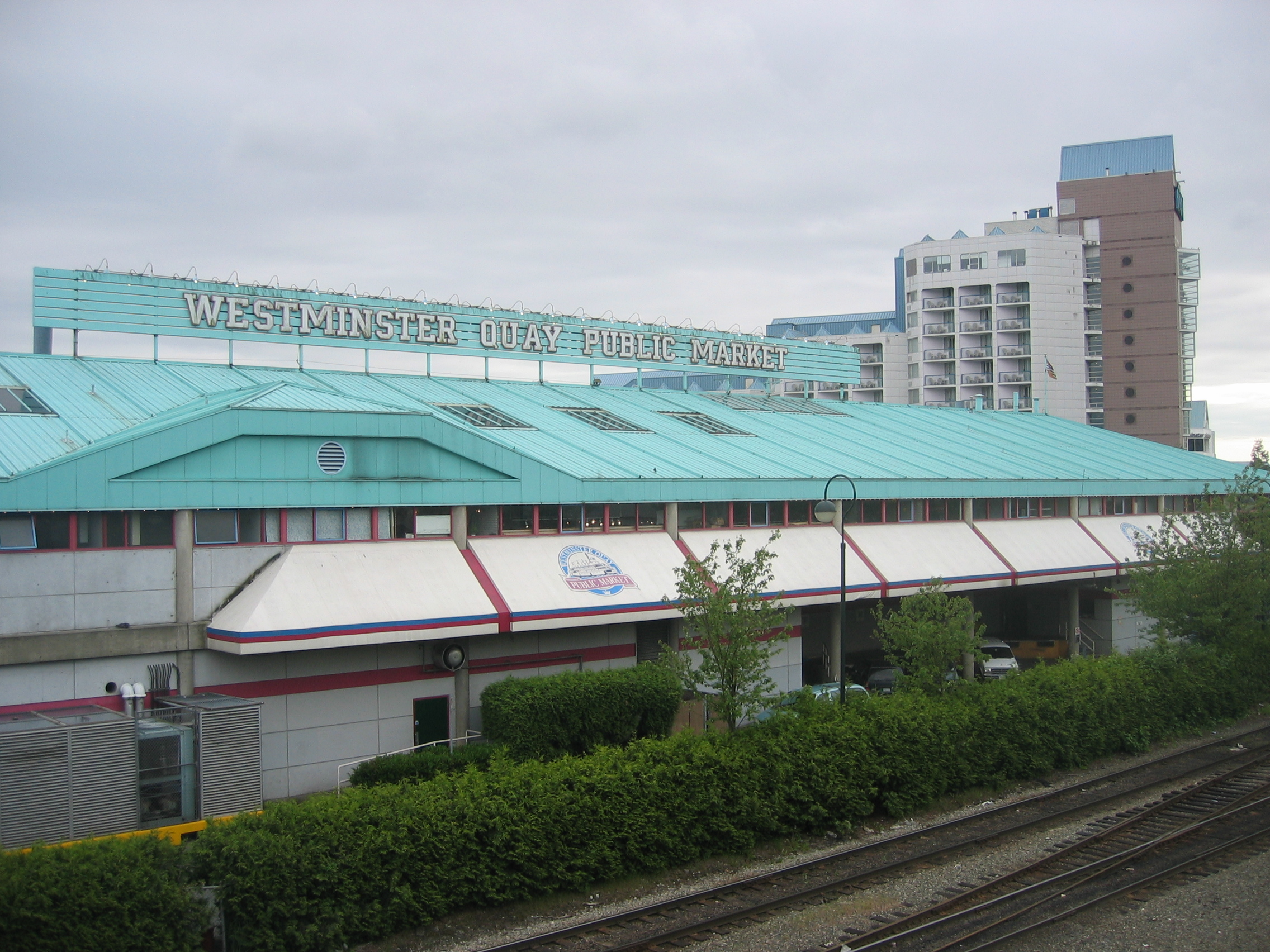
Westminster Quay

Westminster Quay was a mid-1980s development to revitalize New Westminster and accompanied the development of the SkyTrain line to Vancouver. In addition to a large public market and a 2.5-diamond-rated hotel, The Inn at the Quay, a large condominium tower and townhouse complex was built, accessed from the older Columbia Street area of downtown by an overpass. The impetus provided by this project has spilled over onto the inland side of the rail tracks, with new tower developments focusing on the area southwest of 8th Street (the area known formerly as "the Swamp" and Chinatown). As of July 2007, the Quay's commercial component had noticeably decreased, with many vacancies, compared to the much more active Lonsdale Quay Market in North Vancouver. Responding to the decrease of business, the ownership group closed the Westminster Quay Market for renovations. The market re-opened as The River Market in September 2010 with Donald's Market as the main anchor. The Westminster Quay is also known to house a 9.75-metre-tall (32.0 ft) tin soldier which was given the title of the world's largest by the Guinness Book of World Records back in 2002.

== Demographics ==
Historical populations
Year	Pop.	±%
1891	6,678	—
1921	14,495	+117.1%
1931	17,524	+20.9%
1941	21,967	+25.4%
1951	28,639	+30.4%
1956	31,665	+10.6%
1961	33,654	+6.3%
1966	38,013	+13.0%
1971	42,835	+12.7%
1976	38,393	−10.4%
1981	38,550	+0.4%
1986	39,972	+3.7%
1991	43,585	+9.0%
1996	49,350	+13.2%
2001	54,656	+10.8%
2006	58,549	+7.1%
2011	65,976	+12.7%
2016	70,996	+7.6%
2021	78,916	+11.2%
Source: Department of Agriculture, Statistics Canada

In the 2021 Canadian census conducted by Statistics Canada, New Westminster had a population of 78,916 living in 36,099 of its 37,737 total private dwellings, a change of 11.2% from its 2016 population of 70,996. With a land area of 15.62 km^{2} (6.03 sq mi), it had a population density of 5,052.2/km^{2} (13,085.2/sq mi) in 2021. New Westminster had the second highest population density of any Canadian city, trailing only Vancouver.

=== Ethnicity ===
A legacy of early 20th century settlement, the Queensborough neighbourhood has a large South Asian population, primarily of Punjabi Sikh descent.

Panethnic groups in New Westminster (2001−2021)
Panethnic group	2021		2016		2011		2006		2001	
Panethnic group	Pop.	%	Pop.	%	Pop.	%	Pop.	%	Pop.	%
European (Note: Statistic includes all persons that did not make up part of a visible minority or an indigenous identity.)	39,080	50.07%	40,400	57.79%	40,225	61.8%	38,920	67.28%	38,805	72.11%
East Asian (Note: Statistic includes total responses of "Chinese", "Korean", and "Japanese" under visible minority section on census.)	11,075	14.19%	9,465	13.54%	7,475	11.48%	5,270	9.11%	3,850	7.15%
South Asian	8,105	10.38%	5,790	8.28%	5,500	8.45%	4,660	8.06%	4,220	7.84%
Southeast Asian (Note: Statistic includes total responses of "Filipino" and "Southeast Asian" under visible minority section on census.)	8,065	10.33%	6,550	9.37%	5,415	8.32%	3,680	6.36%	2,795	5.19%
African	2,695	3.45%	1,740	2.49%	1,155	1.77%	1,370	2.37%	1,120	2.08%
Latin American	2,560	3.28%	1,275	1.82%	1,155	1.77%	815	1.41%	350	0.65%
Indigenous	2,425	3.11%	2,295	3.28%	2,240	3.44%	1,835	3.17%	1,590	2.95%
Middle Eastern (Note: Statistic includes total responses of "West Asian" and "Arab" under visible minority section on census.)	1,775	2.27%	1,300	1.86%	1,315	2.02%	890	1.54%	680	1.26%
Other/multiracial (Note: Statistic includes total responses of "Visible minority, n.i.e." and "Multiple visible minorities" under visible minority section on census.)	2,275	2.91%	1,085	1.55%	610	0.94%	405	0.7%	400	0.74%
Total responses	78,055	98.91%	69,905	98.46%	65,090	98.66%	57,850	98.81%	53,810	98.45%
Total population	78,916	100%	70,996	100%	65,976	100%	58,549	100%	54,656	100%
Note: Totals greater than 100% due to multiple origin responses.

=== Languages ===
The 2016 census found that English was spoken as mother tongue by 50.47% of the population. The next most common mother tongue language was Tagalog, spoken by 4.5% of the population, followed by Mandarin at 4.4%, and Punjabi at 3.5%.

Rank	Mother tongue	Population	Percentage
1	English	42,925	63.1%
2	Tagalog	3,075	4.5%
3	Mandarin	3,015	4.4%
4	Punjabi	2,410	3.5%
5	Cantonese	2,105	3.1%
6	Spanish	1,265	1.9%
7	Korean	1,245	1.8%
8	Russian	1,035	1.5%
9	French	790	1.2%
10	Romanian	740	1.1%

=== Religion ===
According to the 2021 census, religious groups in New Westminster included:

- Irreligion (36,595 persons or 46.9%)
- Christianity (30,345 persons or 38.9%)
- Sikhism (3,750 persons or 4.8%)
- Islam (2,655 persons or 3.4%)
- Hinduism (2,000 persons or 2.6%)
- Buddhism (1,455 persons or 1.9%)
- Judaism (255 persons or 0.3%)
- Indigenous spirituality (20 persons or <0.1%)

== Media ==
The Columbian, originally the British Columbian, British Columbia's second newspaper, was founded in New Westminster by John Robson (later premier of British Columbia). By the mid-20th century, it had long since been eclipsed by the Vancouver newspapers, and published its last issue on November 15, 1983, after a run of 123 years.

CKNW, one of Canada's first private news radio, hot-line and talk stations, began broadcasting from studios in New Westminster on April 1, 1944, originally in the Royal Windsor Hotel, then at a few other locations in the city, before moving to downtown Vancouver from its final New Westminster location at 8th and McBride, which it occupied from 1967 onwards. Although it has long been counted as a Vancouver station and moved its main studio there in 1996, it was licensed to New Westminster until 2025 and its callsign still includes the letters "NW" for New Westminster. It is a mainstay of the BC broadcasting industry where many notable reporters and broadcasters had their start.

New Westminster is served by two publications: New Westminster Record, part of the Glacier Media chain, which publishes online. In May 2022, New West Anchor, a biweekly newsletter delivering news and event listings via email, was launched by former CKNW and CityNews Vancouver journalist Ria Renouf. Colloquially known as The Anchor, it is a sister publication to The Georgia Straight: both are owned by Overstory Media Group.

== Arts and culture ==
The city has several live performance venues, ranging from the Massey Theatre adjacent to New Westminster High School, to the Burr Theatre, a converted cinema on Columbia Street, and two theatrical venues in Queens Park (One being the Bernie Legge Theatre, home of the Vagabond Players, which were formed in 1937.) The Royal City Musical Theatre, a long-established New Westminster tradition, uses the Massey, while comedy and mystery theatricals use the stages in Queens Park. Also in Queens Park is the Queens Park Arena, longtime home to the legendary New Westminster Salmonbellies professional lacrosse team, as well as an open-air stadium used for baseball and field sports. The Burr Theatre (originally the Columbia Theatre), named for New Westminster native Raymond Burr, was operated by the Raymond Burr Performing Arts Society who produced professional -quality mysteries and comedies between October 2000 and January 2005. February 2005 saw the theatre reopen as a vaudeville theatre with three major productions by The Heartaches Razz Band and in February 2006 collaboration with The Screaming Chicken Theatrical Society produced the first Annual Vancouver International Burlesque Festival. The theatre was sold by the City of New Westminster through a public request for proposal process to the owner of Lafflines Comedy Club. After extensive renovations to convert it into a cabaret style theatre, it is now called The Columbia, home of Lafflines Comedy Club. Douglas College also offers post-secondary training in theatre, stagecraft and music, as well as non-credit courses in music for all ages and ability levels, through the Douglas College Community Music School. Theatre productions and music concerts at Douglas College take place in the Laura C. Muir Performing Arts Theatre and the smaller, more intimate Studio Theatre from September to April. Every year, New Westminster hosts the New West Cultural Crawl to showcase the city's unique and talented artists. The unique Mushtari Begum Festival of Indian Classical Music and Dance, debuted in 2012, is produced by internationally acclaimed artists Cassius Khan and Amika Kushwaha to preserve the rare Indian arts, and is partnered with the Massey Theatre.

== Heritage ==
The main feature of the New Westminster Museum and Archives (NWMA) is the 1865 Irving House, which is said to be the oldest intact house in the BC Lower Mainland. In the museum are treasures such as the 1876 coach used by Lord Dufferin, then Governor General of Canada, to tour the new province of British Columbia including Barkerville via the Cariboo Road. The city's archives hold corporate and personal treasures such as 1859 maps of the city drawn by the Royal Engineers and official city records. Other heritage artifacts in the city include the 1937 Samson V paddlewheeler, the 1890s armouries, 1850s historic cannons, two of the old BC Pen buildings, numerous cemeteries, and dozens of heritage homes, many of which are from the 19th century. The Museum is affiliated with Canadian Museums Association, the Canadian Heritage Information Network, and Virtual Museum of Canada.

=== Hyack Festival and the Hyack Anvil Battery ===
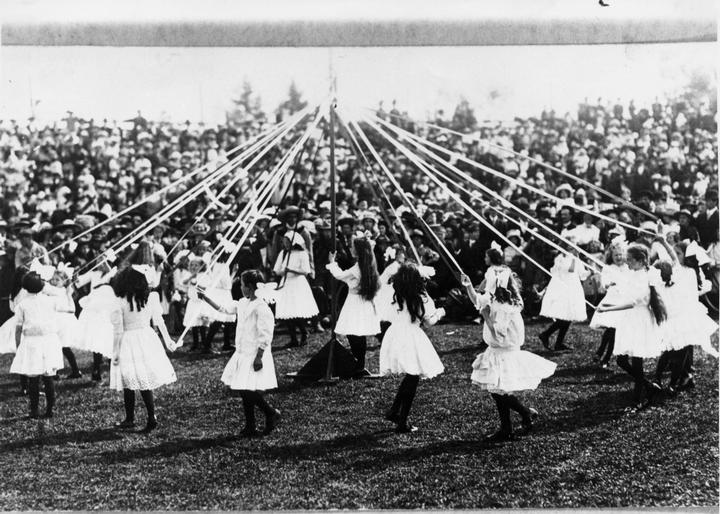
May Day celebrations in 1913. Young girls dance around a maypole.

New Westminster's May Day celebration began in 1870 and continues today as an important civic tradition, lending the city the distinction of having the longest-running May Day celebration of its type in the British Commonwealth. Within BC, at least four other communities still celebrate May Day: Port Coquitlam, Ladner in Delta (whose May Day Festival began in 1896), Bradner in Abbotsford, and The Sunshine Coast's Pender Harbour.

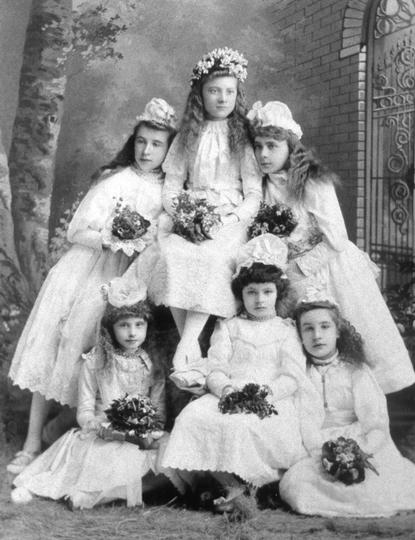
The May Queen c. 1887

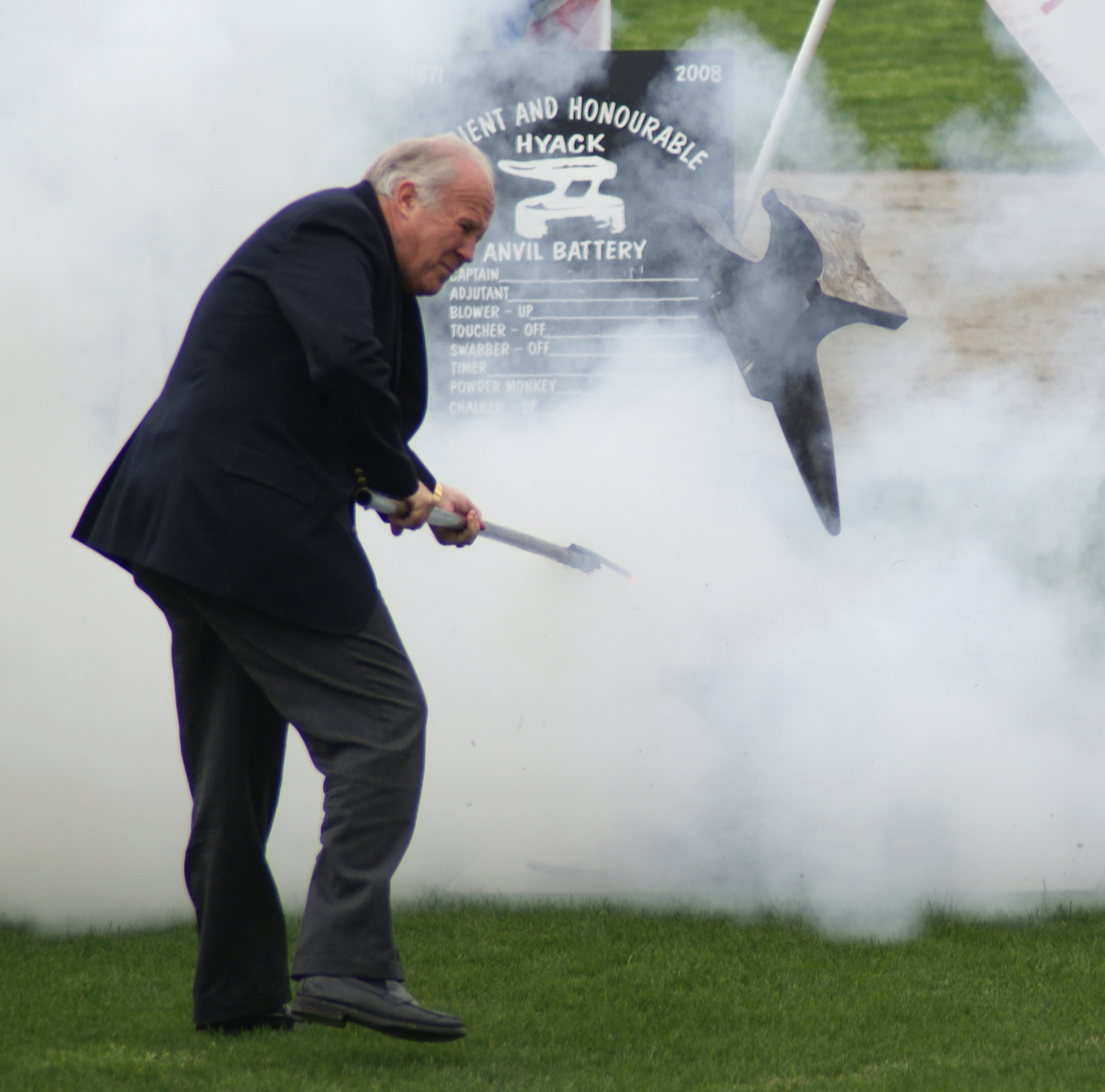
Wayne Wright sets off an anvil shot during the 2008 Ancient and Honourable Hyack Anvil Battery Salute.

The May Day festival, held on the Victoria Day weekend and more formally known as the Hyack Festival, is distinguished by the Ancient and Honourable Hyack Anvil Battery Salute, a tradition created by The New Westminster Fire Department during colonial times as a surrogate for a 21-gun salute. With no cannons available in the early colony, the Fire Department—known as the Hyacks, from the Chinook Jargon word for "fast" or "quick", here derived from its use as a command for "hurry up!"— improvised by placing gunpowder between two anvils, the top one upturned, and igniting the charge from a safe distance, hurling the upper anvil into the air.

Each year, in preparation for May Day, local schoolchildren are taught to dance around a maypole with colourful ribbons. Elections are held at elementary schools in the city, and, from them one girl is selected to become the year's May Queen, and two students from each school to become members of her "May Queen Suite" and "Royal Knights." On a Wednesday of the festival, elementary school students gather at Queen's Park Stadium to dance, and the May Queen is crowned.

== Education ==
Douglas College, a major post-secondary institution in Greater Vancouver, has a campus in New Westminster. The college has an enrollment of 14,000 students and offers degrees, associate degrees, and two-year career and University Transfer programs to local, national and international students.

The Justice Institute of British Columbia offers training to municipal police forces, fire departments, provincial corrections, court services, and paramedics with the British Columbia Ambulance Service. The institute operates a centre for conflict resolution, a centre for leadership and community learning, executive programs, a public safety seminar series, and an Aboriginal leadership diploma program.

The Boucher Institute of Naturopathic Medicine (BINM), the only naturopathic medical school in western Canada, offering the ND degree in naturopathic medicine in both 4-year and 6-year programs is located here.

There is also a campus of the West Coast College of Massage Therapy (WCCMT) located on Columbia Street.

School District 40 New Westminster has one high school (New Westminster Secondary School), three middle schools, and ten elementary schools.

=== Other institutes ===
- Sprott Shaw College
- Winston College

== Transportation ==
=== Road network ===
Much of New Westminster's street network still conforms to the original grid laid out by the Royal Engineers at the time of settlement. The grid is oriented to the riverfront and therefore deviates from the compass directions: streets run northwest to southeast, and avenues run southwest to northeast.

The Trans-Canada Highway (Highway 1) is accessible from nearby Coquitlam, via the Brunette Avenue interchange, and Burnaby, via the Cariboo Road and Canada Way interchanges, and provides expressway access to Vancouver, the North Shore, and the Horseshoe Bay ferry terminal (to the west), and to the British Columbia interior and the communities of the Fraser Valley (to the east, via the Port Mann Bridge). On its northern and western edges, New Westminster is connected to Vancouver by the street system of the city of Burnaby. The three major arterial streets in Burnaby connecting New Westminster and Vancouver are Canada Way (until 1967 named the Grandview Highway, and called 8th St. once it enters New Westminster), Kingsway (12th St.), and Marine Way (Stewardson Way). Kingsway connects New Westminster with the major shopping and entertainment district of Metrotown, in central Burnaby, and then proceeds to downtown Vancouver.

The Queensborough Bridge (part of Highway 91A) connects mainland New Westminster to Queensborough, Richmond, and, via the Alex Fraser Bridge, Delta. The stal̕əw̓asəm Bridge links New Westminster with Surrey. The lesser-used Derwent Way Bridge connects Queensborough with Annacis Island of Delta.

Due to the COVID-19 pandemic, the city reallocated road space in New Westminster for cyclists and pedestrians as part of Streets for People in 2020 initiative.

=== Public transit ===
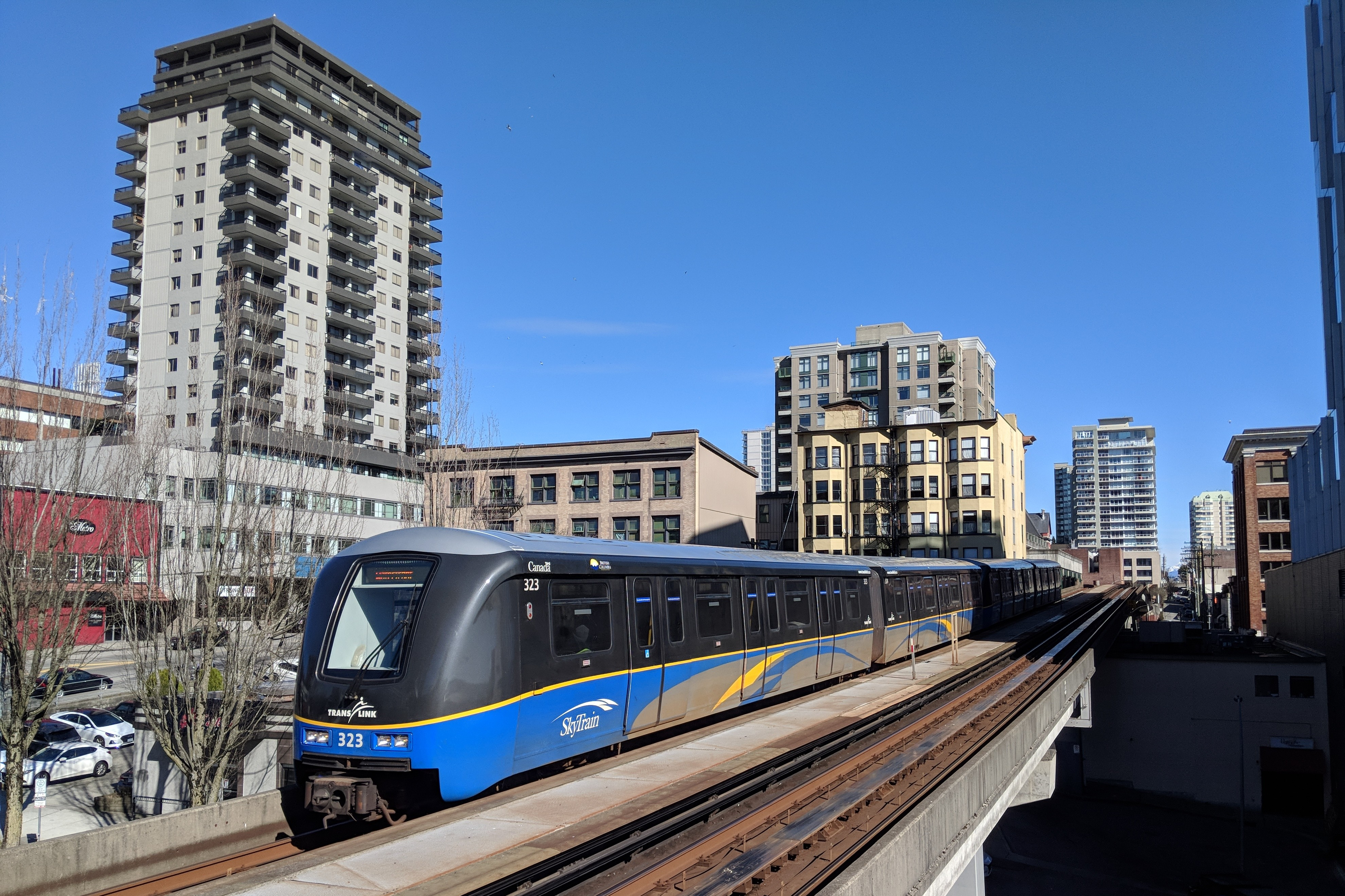
An Expo Line train approaching New Westminster station

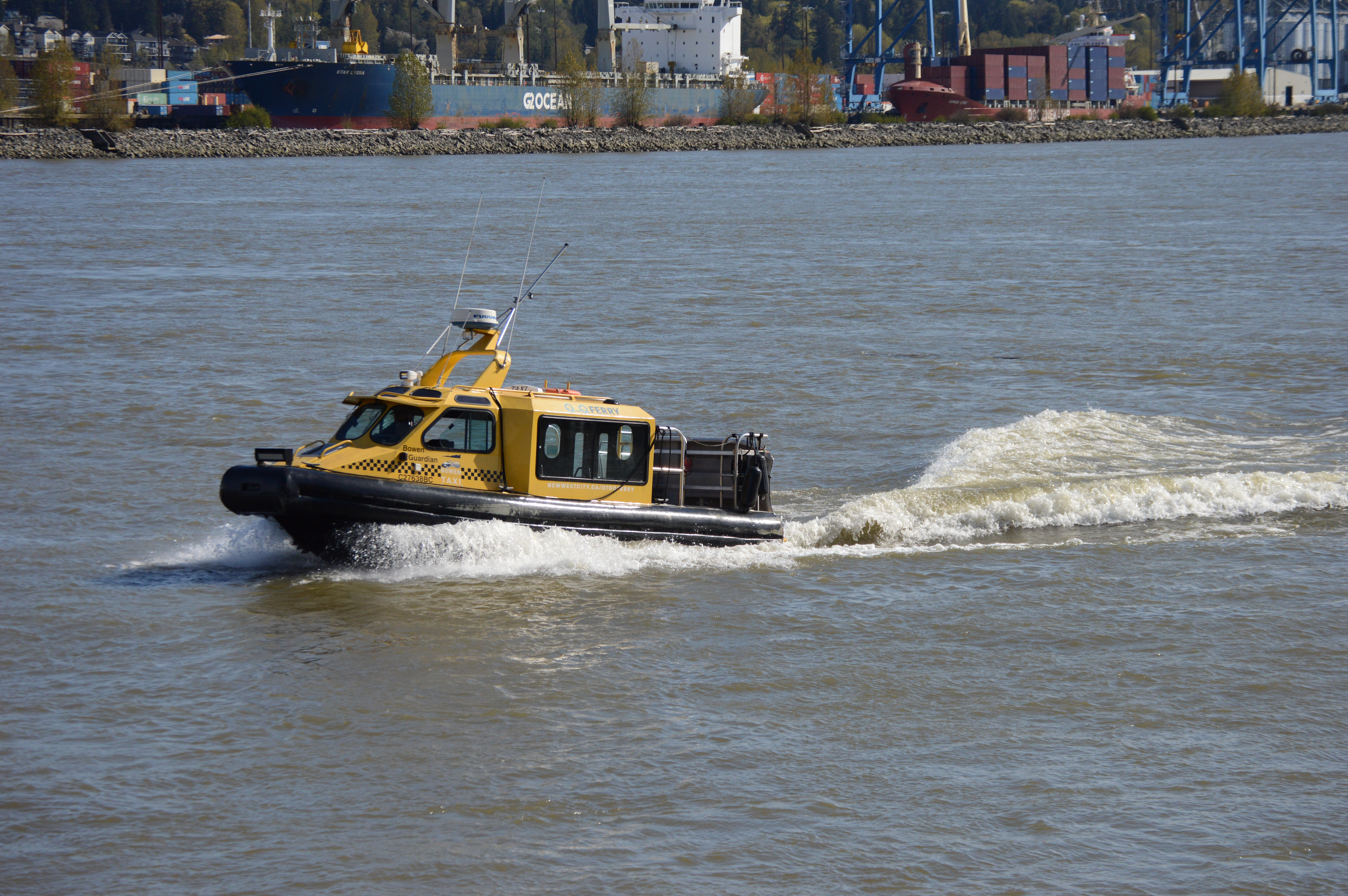
Q to Q passenger ferry arriving at the Quayside dock

Public transportation is provided by TransLink. Along with a number of bus routes, the city is served by the following stations on the SkyTrain system:

- 22nd Street station (Expo Line)
- Braid station (Expo Line)
- Columbia station (Expo Line)
- New Westminster station (Expo Line)
- Sapperton station (Expo Line)

The city is located within Zone 2 of TransLink's fare structure.

The Q to Q Ferry runs from the Quay to the neighbourhood of Queensborough on Lulu Island.

=== Railways ===
The city is served by four railways: Canadian National Railway, Canadian Pacific Railway (CPR), Burlington Northern and Santa Fe, and the Southern Railway of British Columbia shortline. None offer passenger service.

=== Streetcars and the interurban ===
Until the 1950s, New Westminster was linked to Vancouver and other municipalities by the BC interurban tram network (a type of interurban electric railway) under British Columbia Electric Railway. The Central Park Line was operated from 1891 to 1958.

== Sports and recreation ==
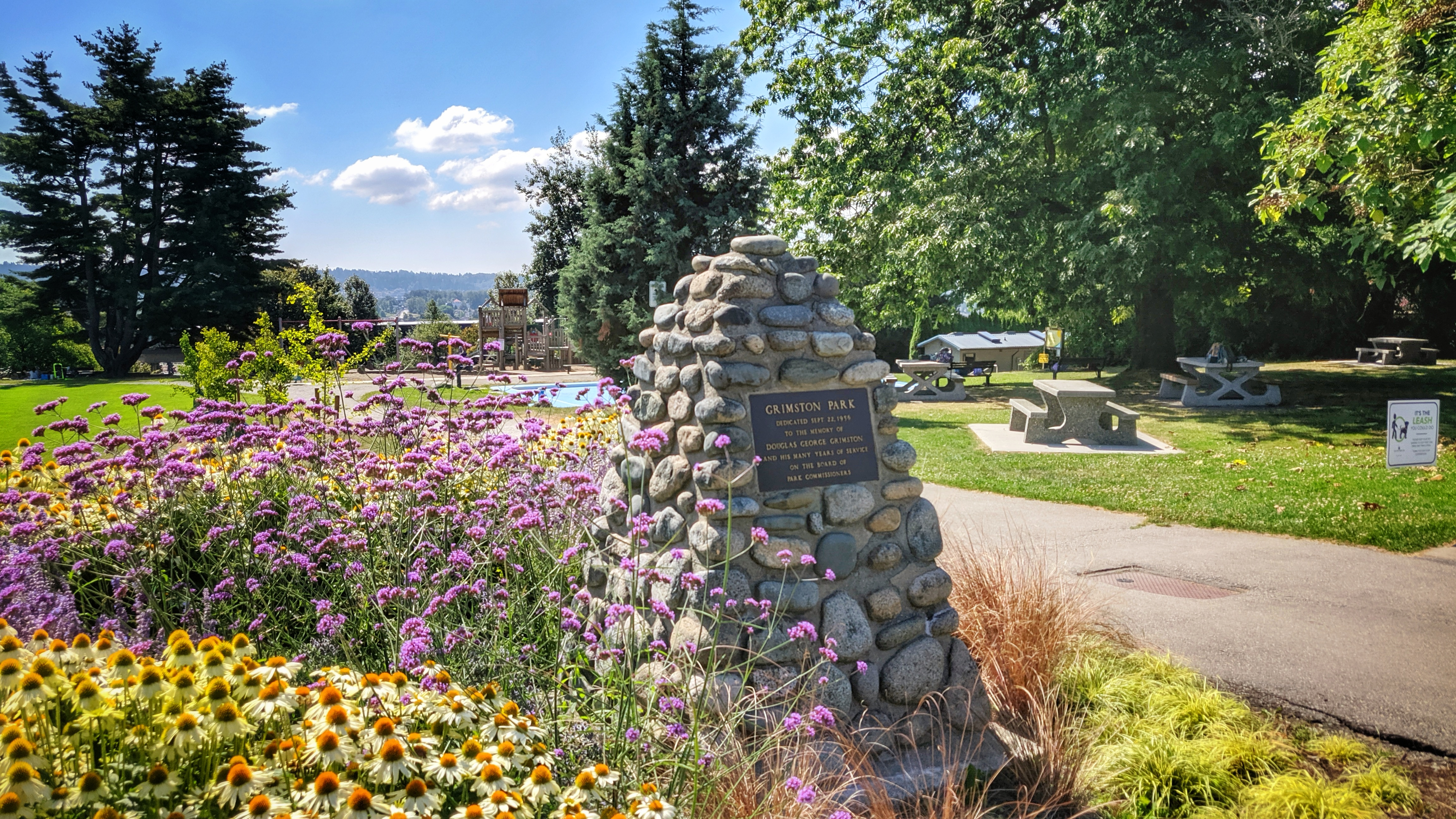
Memorial cairn at Grimston Park in New Westminster

The New Westminster Salmonbellies are one of the oldest professional lacrosse teams in Canada, and also have junior and midget teams. The 'Bellies, as they are also known, have won the Mann Cup 24 times. New Westminster is also the location of the Canadian Lacrosse Hall of Fame.

The New Westminster Royals were a professional major league hockey team from 1911 through 1914, in the heyday of the Pacific Coast Hockey Association. Their home rink was the Denman Arena in Vancouver, which they shared with rivals the Vancouver Millionaires.

Playing at Queen's Park Arena were two incarnations of a Western Hockey League junior team, the New Westminster Bruins (1971–1981 and 1983–1988).

The Royal City Hyacks Football Club offers football and cheerleading for youth aged 5–13, while the local high school, New Westminster Secondary School has high school football at the junior and varsity level.

New Westminster has had a minor league baseball team called the New Westminster Frasers of the Northwest League, which played its home games at Queen's Park Stadium and lasted only one season in 1974.

Pocomo Rugby Football Club and Douglas Rugby Club (both teams play in New Westminster) merged in 2005 to form the United Rugby Club. Pocomo moved to New Westminster in the late 1960s, eventually calling Hume Park its home field. Douglas was formed by Pocomo players attending Douglas College in 1972. United Rugby currently uses Hume Park and Queens Park for home venues.

Youth soccer in New Westminster is represented by the New West Youth Soccer Club (formerly known as Royal City Youth Soccer Club), established in 1965, with teams for boys and girls aged 4 to 17 that participate in league play from September to March. Additionally, the club offers spring programs for children aged 4 to 9 and futsal for children aged 10 to 17.

The Sapperton Rovers men's soccer team has a long history in New Westminster. Soccer in the Sapperton Community goes back to mid 19th century; the first soccer game in BC was played in New Westminster on Victoria Day, May 24, 1862, in the Woodlands/Victoria Hill area. The Columbian newspaper reported that the Victoria Day celebration included several sporting and cultural events, including a "football" (soccer) match between the Royal Engineers, known as the "Sappers" and the townsfolk. Sapperton Park was donated to the city in 1907 for the sole purpose of being used as a soccer venue. Many teams have since carried the Sapperton name.

New Westminster co-hosted the 1973 Canada Games with Burnaby.

The Hyack Swim Club, in operation since 1973, trains swimmers at Canada Games Pool, from a grassroots level up to international competition. Swimmers from across the Lower Mainland come to Canada Games Pool to train with this swim club. The swim club has trained many Olympians, Paralympians, and members of Canada's national team. Hyack Swim Club hosts four meets each year, two of which are held at Canada Games Pool. The premier meet each year is held during the Hyack Festival, and attracts swimmers from across the province, Alberta, Washington, and Oregon. Mark Bottrill has been Hyack's Director of Swimming since 1999. Hyack Swim Club's Drew Christensen represented Canada at the 2008 Paralympic Games.

In July 2014, Major League Soccer's Vancouver Whitecaps FC announced plans to launch a USL-Pro team in New Westminster, but the deal fell through due to the city refusing to pay over $11 million to upgrade Queen's Park Stadium and local opposition. If it had been approved, the club would have been the first Division 3 club in Canada and the sixth professional team in the country.

== Notable people ==
- Walter James Baber, painter
- Raymond Burr, actor
- Josh Byrne, lacrosse player
- Felix Cartal, musical artist
- Jon Cornish, football player
- Moses B. Cotsworth, inventor of the 13-month International Fixed Calendar, political and calendar reformer
- Mary Ann Cunningham, social reformer and temperance activist
- Crystal Dahl, actress
- Lorne Doerkson, Premier-designate of British Columbia
- Brendan Fehr, actor
- Bruno Gerussi, actor
- Jeanne Gilchrist, baseball player of the All-American Girls Professional Baseball League
- Doug Grimston (1900–1955), ice hockey administrator and president of the Canadian Amateur Hockey Association
- Daryl Hine, poet
- Cody Husband, football player
- E. A. Jenns, poet
- Alexz Johnson, actress and musician
- Peter Julian, community activist
- Bill Kenny, lead singer of The Ink Spots
- Cassius Khan, Indian classical Ghazal/Tabla musician
- Farhan Lalji, sportscaster TSN
- Robert Langlands, Wolf Prize winning mathematician
- Nicholas Lea, actor
- John Keefer Mahony, soldier, recipient of the Victoria Cross
- Mandrake the Magician
- Eva Markvoort, blogger
- Katherina Matousek, pairs figure skating Olympian and 1984–1985 World bronze medallist
- James Moore, former politician
- Justin Morneau, baseball player
- David Pol, football player
- Belle Puri, journalist
- Bill Ranford, NHL goaltender, 1990 NHL Playoff MVP, Goaltending coach, Los Angeles Kings
- Mike Reno, musician
- Renée Sarojini Saklikar, poet and writer, wife of Adrian Dix
- Ernest Smith (aka "Smokey" Smith), soldier, recipient of the Victoria Cross
- Tracy Smith, long jumper
- Snak the Ripper, rapper
- Dave Steen, decathlete, Olympic medalist
- Robert Thirsk, astronaut
- Devin Townsend, musician
- Kyle Turris, ice hockey player
- Terry Yake, ice hockey player

== International relations ==
=== Sister cities ===
- Moriguchi, Osaka, Japan: The sister city relationship between New Westminster and Moriguchi in 1962–1963 was the first sister city agreement between Canadian and Japanese cities.
- Quezon City, Philippines. The agreement was signed in June 1991.
- Lijiang, Yunnan, China in 2002.

=== Friendship cities ===
- Zhenjiang, Jiangsu, China (2008)
- Yunfu, Guangdong, China (2009)

=== Adopted city ===
- Anapa: During World War II, in 1944, New Westminster "adopted" Anapa, a town on the northeastern Black Sea coast. This was not a formal sister city arrangement and it has lapsed in the intervening years.

== See also ==
- Architecture of Greater Vancouver
- New Westminster Police Department
- Royal Westminster Regiment
