= Boise A's =

- 1975–1976; Boise, Idaho

Minor league affiliations
- Previous classes: Class A Short Season
- League: Northwest League
- Division: South

Major league affiliations
- Previous teams: Oakland Athletics

Team data
- Colors: Kelly green, athletic gold, white
- Ballpark: Borah Field (now Wigle Field)

The Boise Athletics were a minor league baseball team located in Boise, Idaho. They were members of the Class A-Short Season Northwest League for two seasons (1975, 1976) and were affiliated with the Oakland Athletics.

== History ==
In 1974, the Northwest League awarded Boise a new franchise to begin play in 1975. However, by the close of the season, the league's expansion plans were thwarted by the termination of operations by the Lewiston Broncs and Tri-City Atoms. The New Westminster Frasers sought a new home after enduring a season of poor attendance, and relocated to Boise. This was Boise's first entry in the Northwest League. The Oakland Athletics, who had been partnered with Lewiston, signed a player development contract with Boise. The club adopted their parent club's name to become the Boise Athletics; the parent club had won a third consecutive World Series in 1974.

On June 18, 1975, Boise hosted its first professional baseball game since 1963 with 1,814 in attendance. Tom Trebelhorn, who played the previous season in the Oakland farm system at Lewiston, served as manager. The A's finished the season at an even 38–38 (.500), but Boise struggled financially, which was attributed to the absence of beer sales. Their home field was located on a high school campus and the school board denied the sale of beer. Despite the lack of beer revenue, they were third in home attendance in the six-team league.

Trebelhorn returned as manager in 1976 and the new player on Boise's roster was Rickey Henderson, He played in 46 games for Boise and hit .336 as a 17-year-old. Even with Henderson, attendance had fallen in the A's second season. With only 181 guests in attendance, the A's closed out the season in a loss against the Walla Walla Padres in what became their final game; and finished the season at 33–38 (.465).

Following the season, it was reported by the Medicine Hat News in Alberta that an executive of the Boise A’s Northwest League baseball team said he has talked to municipal officials and businessmen in Medicine Hat about the possibility of moving the club into the city and into the Pioneer League. A little more than a month later, it was confirmed that the Boise franchise was departing the City of Trees for Medicine Hat as a member of the Pioneer League.

Boise took a one-year hiatus from baseball, with the unaffiliated Buckskins beginning (and ending) play in 1978; the Hawks' first season was nine years later.

== Ballpark ==
Home games of the Boise A's were played at Borah Field (now Bill Wigle Field) on the campus of Borah High School. Also the home of the Buckskins (1978) and Hawks for their first two seasons (1987, 1988), the ballpark is still in use today for high school and American Legion play.

== Season records ==
| Season | PDC | Division | Finish | Wins | Losses | Win% | Postseason | Manager | Attendance |
|---|---|---|---|---|---|---|---|---|---|
Boise A's
| 1975 | OAK | South | 3rd | 38 | 38 | .500 | | Tom Trebelhorn | 29,286 |
| 1976 | OAK | South | 3rd | 33 | 38 | .465 | | Tom Trebelhorn | 16,294 |

== Notable alumni ==
- Brian Kingman (1975)
- Darrell Woodard (1975)
- Rickey Henderson (1976)
- Boise A's players

| Preceded by New Westminster Frasers | Northwest League franchise 1975-1976 | Succeeded by Medicine Hat A's |
