= Queen's Park Stadium (New Westminster) =

Stadium in Queen's Park, New Westminster, British Columbia

- Interactive map of Queen's Park Stadium
- Location: New Westminster, British Columbia
- Coordinates: 49.2132°N 122.9052°W
- Operator: City of New Westminster
- Capacity: ~2000
- Type: Baseball
- Surface: Grass
- Acreage: 3.12 acres

Construction
- Built: 1939; 87 years ago
- Renovated: 1950

Tenant
- New Westminster Frasers (NWL) 1974

Queen's Park Stadium is a multi-use stadium located within Queen's Park in New Westminster, British Columbia. Its primary use is for baseball and civic events, but it also sees usage as a training ground for a variety of other New Westminster sports clubs.

The stadium grounds are used for two of the main events of the annual Hyack Festival in New Westminster, the May Day dances, and the Anvil Battery Salute.

In 2014, the Vancouver Whitecaps FC soccer club attempted to reach an agreement with the City of New Westminster to rebuild/renovate Queen's Park stadium to be a suitable venue for their second team in the USL Pro league. The proposal was eventually rejected due to the city's unwillingness to make an eleven million dollar investment for the new facilities, alongside public opposition from residents of the Queen's Park neighbourhood, and the larger baseball community as a whole.
