= Tipperary Park =

Park in New Westminster, Canada

- Interactive map of Tipperary Park
- Type: Community park
- Location: New Westminster, BC, Canada
- Coordinates: 49.208206°N 122.908575°W
- Area: 6.38 acres (2.58 ha)
- Elevation: ~75m
- Established: 1908; 118 years ago
- Etymology: The "Westminster Tipperary" (The Daily Columbian. 1889)
- Owner: City of New Westminster
- Manager: New Westminster Parks & Recreation

Tipperary Park is a community park located in the Downtown neighbourhood of New Westminster, just Northeast of New Westminster City Hall. The park technically only includes the grounds Northeast of 4th Street, however, the park's name is often used to refer to the adjacent Friendship Gardens and the front lawn of the City Hall. The park itself is lightly treed and has several paved pathways for cyclists and pedestrians. The nearby Friendship Gardens is renowned for its water features including several artificial waterfalls, stepping-stone paths, a duck pond, and a footbridge painted red and black (culturally important colours in New Westminster as they were worn by the Royal Engineers).

== History ==
The land currently occupied by the park was initially designated by Colonel Moody as the location for British Columbia's government buildings. Unfortunately for Moody and the rest of the city, the unification of the Mainland Colony of British Columbia and the Colony of Vancouver Island in 1866 led to Victoria being awarded the capital, leaving the lands of Tipperary Park with no inherent purpose. The land became known as Tipperary Park due to the presence of worker camps, which were formed by street construction workers and their families in 1889. The Daily Columbian, a New Westminster newspaper, published a story about the camps, comparing them to worker and squatter settlements in County Tipperary, Ireland, causing residents of the city to call the area "New Tipperary." The land was eventually used by the New Westminster Lawn Tennis & Croquet Club who set up a sporting facility in 1901 with permission from the provincial government. In 1908, the land which was still under provincial jurisdiction, was transferred to the City of New Westminster, and was subsequently established as a municipal park.

== Amenities ==
Tipperary Park is still the home of the New Westminster Tennis Club, who moved to the park grounds in 1901. The park is also just across the street from Irving House, a heritage home which was converted into a museum about the history of the Irving family and New Westminster in general. Tipperary Park is also the location of the New West Farmers Market, which operates in the spring and summer, where vendors from across the Lower Mainland come to distribute their food products. Friendship Gardens is also a popular spot for photography in the city (especially in the spring), and is frequently visited by couples for wedding photoshoots.

== See also ==
- Queen's Park, New Westminster
