= New Westminster Frasers =

- (1974); New Westminster, British Columbia

Minor league affiliations
- Class: Class A Short Season
- League: Northwest League
- Division: West

Major league affiliations
- Team: Independent (1974)

Team data
- Colors: Royal blue, orange, white
- Ballpark: Queen's Park Stadium
- General manager: Dean Taylor

The New Westminster Frasers were a minor league baseball team located in British Columbia, Canada. The Frasers were members of the short-season Class A Northwest League for a single season in 1974. The comedic exploits of the Frasers are chronicled in the book Burning Up the Infield: The 1974 Frasers co-authored by Ken McIntosh and Rod Drown. The book was later adapted as a stage play performed by City Stage New West.

== History ==
Playing as an independent club, the Frasers would be required to source their own players. The club also held regional tryouts. In a game that would be the last in the franchise's short existence, New Westminster closed out the season losing 14-0 against Seattle. The Frasers 34-50 placed the team at the bottom of the division standings. Prior to the 1975 season the New Westminster franchise was moved to Boise where it continued play as the Boise A's.

== Ballpark ==
The Frasers played their home games at Queen's Park Stadium.

== Season-by-season record ==
Season	PDC	Division	Finish	Wins	Losses	Win%	Postseason	Manager	Attendance
New Westminster Frasers
1974		West	3rd	34	50	.405		John Wojcik	10,599
