= Queen's Park, New Westminster =

Coordinates: 49°12′51.41″N 122°54′18.30″W

Queen's Park
- Neighbourhood of New Westminster
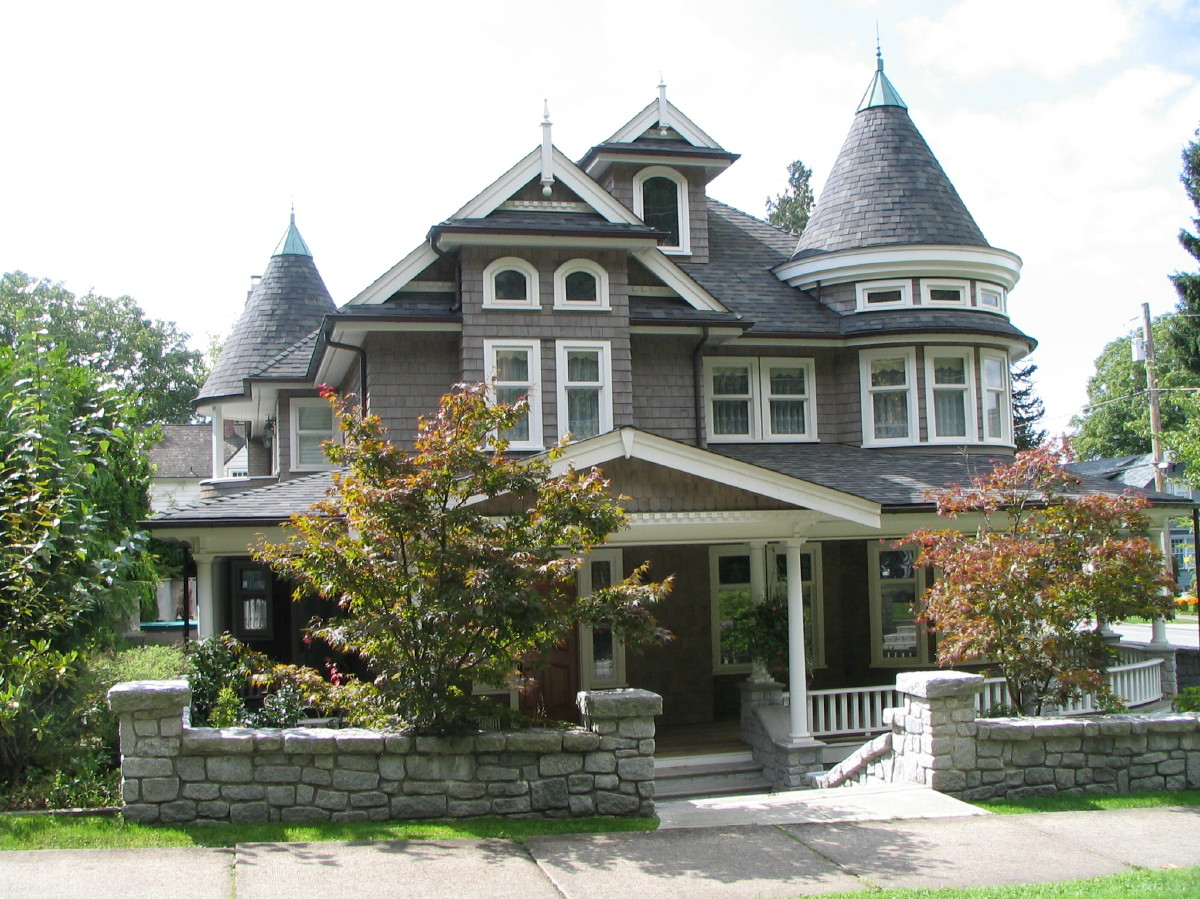
- A replica of a Queen Anne house in Queen's Park

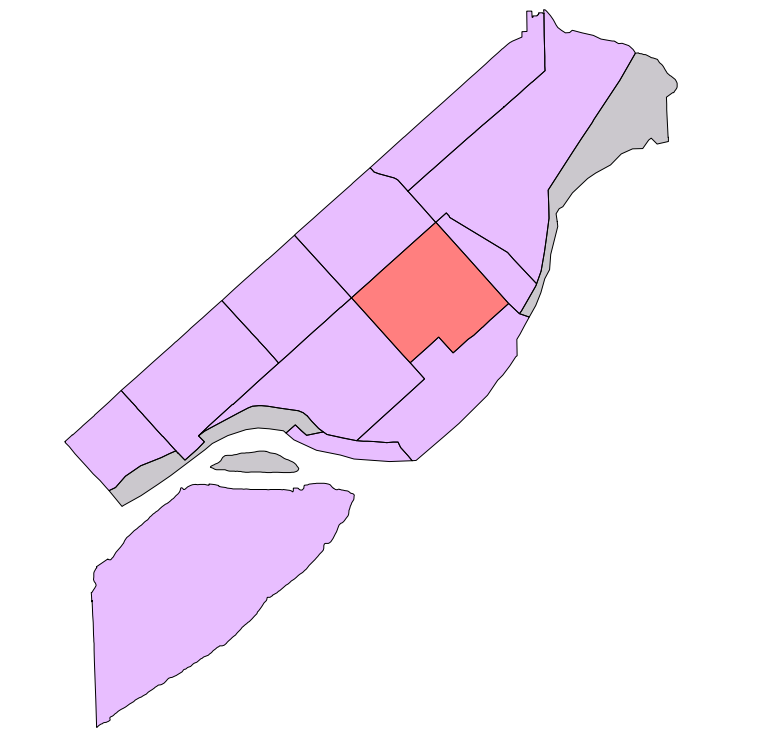
- Location of Queen's Park neighbourhood shown in red
- Country: Canada
- Province: British Columbia
- Regional District: Metro Vancouver
- City: New Westminster

Queen's Park is a neighbourhood and community park in New Westminster, British Columbia, Canada.

The recreational area and tourist attraction dates from 1887. The park is 75 acres (300,000 m^{2}) in extent, and is located north east of the city hall. The park houses Queen's Park Arena, current home of the New Westminster Salmonbellies, Queen's Park Stadium, a seasonal animal petting farm, spray park, tennis courts, sports fields and band shell.

Queen's Park residential area is to the southwest of the park, bounded on the northwest by 6th Avenue, on the southwest by 6th Street, on the southeast by Royal Avenue, and on the north by the park itself.

== History ==
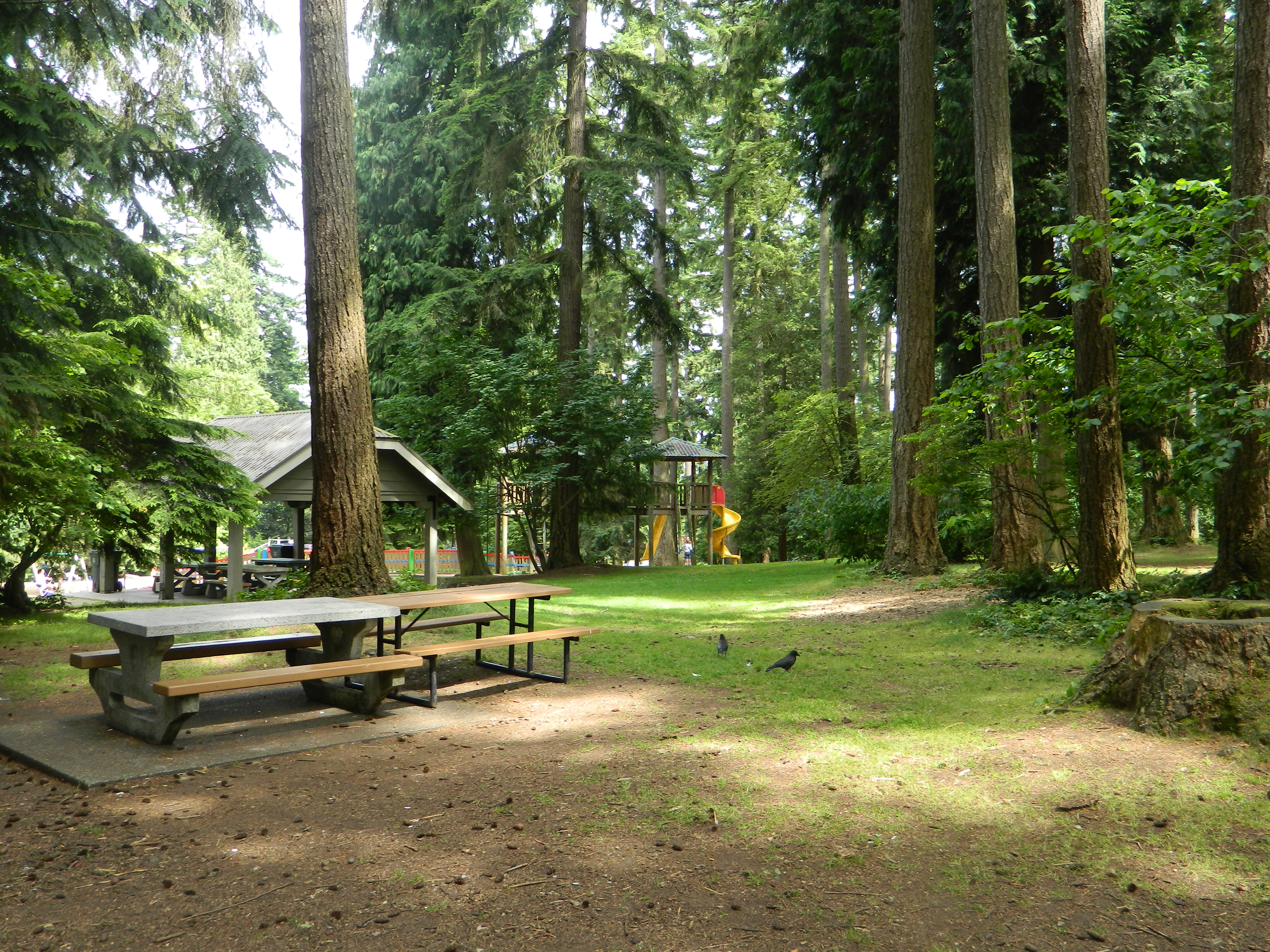
A forested space within Queen's Park

=== 1859 to 1900 ===
Queen's Park was the first established public park in British Columbia, as New Westminster was established in 1859. Originally, the park was named 'Queen's Ravine' by Colonel Richard Clement Moody. In the 1870s, the reserve in which the park was in was split into an area for a penitentiary, asylum, and the park itself. The park was officially declared open in 1887 as a celebration of Queen Victoria's 50th year as a monarch. In 1890, an exhibition building was built which could house up to 5,000 people. The building was created for viewing of the athletic fields and race track.

=== 1901 to 1945 ===
The first zoo was built in the park in 1906 by the local firemen, which contained animals such as bears and cougars. The New Westminster Arena was built in 1914 with the original intention of housing horse competitions, but was transformed into an ice rink instead. During the First World War, the park was used as a training site for the Royal Expeditionary Force. The buildings were also transformed into barracks to house the soldiers in training. In 1929, there was a large fire which destroyed most of the buildings in Queen's Park, and the area was not restored until much later, due to the Great Depression. The park was later turned again into training grounds and housing for soldiers in the Westminster Regiment during the Second World War.

== See also ==
- Tipperary Park
