= Joseph Baber =

American classical composer (1937–2022)

Joseph Wilson Baber Jr. (September 11, 1937 – March 19, 2022) was an American composer, violist, and composition teacher living in Lexington, Kentucky.

== Life ==
Baber was born in 1937 in Richmond, Virginia, and died in Lexington, Kentucky. He was a Professor of Theory and Composition at the University of Kentucky from 1971 to 2021, and the longtime principal violist of Lexington Philharmonic Orchestra.

== Selected works ==
Information from and.

- Op. 1: Duos for Violin and Viola
- Op. 2a: Longfellow Songs
  - "It Is Not Always May"
  - "The Aftermath"
  - "Serenade"
  - "The Rainy Day"
  - "The Tide Rises, the Tide Falls"
  - "Snow-flakes"
- Op. 2b: Emersonian Hymns
  - "The Informing Spirit"
  - "Compensation"
  - "Thine Eyes Still Shined"
  - "Thought"
  - "Terminus"
  - "To Ellen"
  - "Nature"
- Op. 3: Miscellaneous Instrumental (1960)
- Op. 4: Wise Men And Shepherds, Christmas cantata (1951)
- Op. 5: Instrumental Works for Winds
  - Sonnet for Solo Oboe, Flute and String Orchestra
  - Meditation for Solo Bassoon
  - Sketches for Flute and Piano
- Op. 6: Cavalier Lyrics (1960)
  - "Song (Sedley)"
  - "Why So Pale and Wan" (Sir John Suckling)
  - "Take, O Take Those Lips Away" (Shakespeare)
  - "The Constant Lover" (Sir John Suckling)
  - "To a Lady Asking Him How Long He Would Love Her" (Sir George Etherege)
  - "Of the Last Verses in the Book"
  - "To Blossoms" (Robert Herrick)
- Op. 7: Serenade for String Orchestra
- Op. 8: Serenade for String Trio (1975)
- Op. 9: Shakespearean Madrigals
  - "Fie on Sinful Fantasy"
  - "Tell Me Where"
  - "I Am Gone, Sir"
  - "Who Is Sylvia?"
  - "When Icicles Hang By the Wall"
  - "Weep No More, Ladies"
  - " Mistress Mine"
  - "It Was a Lover and His Lass"
  - "Under the Greenwood Tree"
- Op. 10: Overture to As You Like It
- Op. 11: Kingdom of the Heart's Content for Piano (Seasonal Sketches)
- Op. 12: American Songs (1957)
  - "Words" (John Hay)
  - "The Dying Lover" (Richard Henry Stoddard)
  - "The Dark Hills" (Edwin Arlington Robinson)
  - "Nancibel" (Bliss Carman)
  - "To a Golden Haired Girl in a Louisiana Town" (Vachel Lindsay)
  - "(Mysteries)" (Emily Dickinson)
  - "Terminus" (Emerson)
  - "Evening Song" (Sidney Lanier)
  - "The Runner in the Skies" (James Oppenheim)
  - "Force" (Edward Rowland Sill)
- Op. 13: Bagatelle-Preludes (for piano)
- Op. 14: Incidental Music (Michigan)
  - Music for the play Tiger at the Gates (Jean Anouilh)
  - Music for the play Our Town (Thornton Wilder)
  - Honor's Concert Prize piece, Music for String Orchestra
  - Castelnuovo-Tedesco Variations for Piano
  - Sketchbooks: impressions in shorts score of mid-western scenes
  - Preludes for Piano, written for Virginia Bodman (1959–1962)
- Op. 15: Two Sonatas for Viola and Piano
- Op. 16: Twelve American Pastorals for SSA and Cello Ensemble (Harmonium)
  - Afternoon on a Hill (Edna St Vincent Millay)
  - On a Dayward Height
  - Valley Song (Carl Sandburg)
  - (Indian Summer) (Emily Dickenson)
  - Wind in the Sunlit Trees (Conrad Aiken)
  - Former Barn Lot (Mark Van Doren)
  - Wild Peaches (Elinor Wylie)
  - A Winter Piece (William Cullen Bryant)
  - Daisies (Bliss Carman)
  - The Road (John Gould Fletcher)
  - Meadowlarks (Sara Teasdale)
  - The Spice Tree (Vachel Lindsey)
- Op. 16a: Five Pastorals for Soprano and lower strings
- Op. 17: The Klausli Service (Music for Richard Klausli and the Plymouth Congregationalist Church)
- Op. 18: Songbook: Miscellaneous Uncollected Songs
  - Eldorado (Edgar Allan Poe)
  - The Traveller (Vachel Lindsey)
  - "A Boy's Will" (Longfellow: Stanzas 1 & 2 of My Lost Youth)
  - I Will Build a House
  - In the Train (Teasdale)
  - A Vagabond Song (Bliss Carman)
  - The First Snow-fall (Lowell)
  - Wood Song (Teasdale)
  - Afternoon on a Hill (Millay)
  - A Winter Piece (Bryant)
  - Meadowlarks (Teasdale)
- Op. 19: Shakespearean Songs for high voice and piano
  - Full Fathom Five
  - Willow Song
  - Take, O Take Those Lips Away
  - Under the Greenwood Tree
  - Tell Me Where Is Fancy Bred
  - The Master, The Swabber, The Boatswain
  - Take, O Take Those Lips Away (second version)
  - It Was a Lover and His Lass
  - Blow, Blow, Thy Winter Wind
- Op. 20: Organ Preludes on Protestant Hymn Tunes
- Op. 21: Trio for Violin, Viola and Violoncello
- Op. 22: Rhapsody for Viola and Orchestra
- Op. 23: Sonata for Violin and Piano
- Op. 24: Overture: The New Land
- Op. 25: Trio for Oboe, Viola and Piano
- Op. 26: Concerto No. 1 for Viola and String Orchestra
- Op. 27: Psalms for Chorus SATB
- Op. 28: Concerto No. 2 for Viola and Orchestra
- Op. 29: Songs of Love and Loss
  - Pity Me Not (Edna St Vincent Millay)
  - The Net (Sara Teasdale)
  - Men Loved Wholly Beyond Wisdom (Louise Bogan)
  - This Quiet Dust (Emily Dickenson)
  - Where No Thoughts Are (Anna Hempstead Branch)
- Op. 30: String Quartet
- Op. 31: Incidental Music (Illinois)
  - Keyboard Toccatas (for Dwight Peltzer) (1969)
  - Scherzo for Viola and Piano (1969)
- Op. 32: Divertimentos
- Op. 33: Songbook: Miscellaneous Uncollected Songs
  - Go and Catch a Falling Star (John Donne)
  - In Time of 'The Breaking of Nations' (Thomas Hardy)
  - The Widow's Song (Pinkney)
  - Up-Hill (Rossetti)
  - Mnemosyne (Trumbull Stickney)
  - Cradle Song of the Infant Jesus for Soprano, Viola and Organ (Old French Noel) (2012)
- Op. 34: Works for Unaccompanied String
- Op. 35: Music from the Kansas College Co-operative Composers Project
  - Prelude for Band (1970–1971)
  - Scherzo for Chamber Orchestra (1970)
  - Carol (SATB)
  - Alleluias (SATB)
  - To Everything There Is a Season (SATB)
  - I Beseech You, Therefore, Brethren (SATB) (1971)
- Op. 36: Three Madrigals on Lyrics by Thomas Campion for Solo Voices
  - "I Care Not for These Ladies"
  - "Rose-cheek'd Laura, come"
  - "Now winter nights"
- Op. 37: Mephisto Rhapsody for Violin and Piano (1971)
- Op. 38: Partita for Keyboard (1975–2008)
- Op. 39: "Fox and Bear" – A Children's Guide to the Orchestra for Narrator and Orchestra
- Op. 40: Frankenstein: Opera in 4 Acts (with John Gardner) (1969–1980)
- Op. 41: Five Fantasias on Finnish Folk Songs for SATB and Piano 4-hands
  - Kalliole Kukkulalle
  - Minun Kultani
  - Lapsuuden Ystavalle
  - Ranalle-Istaja Neito
  - Rukkaset
- Op. 42: Rumpelstiltskin: Opera in 2 Acts (with John Gardner)
- Op. 43: Landscapes for Soprano and Nine 'Cellos (T. S. Eliot)
- Op. 44: Missa Brevis for Women's Chorus SSA and Organ
- Op. 45: Rhapsody for Two 'Cellos and Orchestra
- Op. 46: Symphony No. 1 in E minor (1979)
- Op. 47: Six Sinfonias for Piano
- Op. 48: Music for St. Michaels (Church of St Michael the Archangel, Lexington)
- Op. 49: Three Fantasias for String Quartet
- Op. 50: Ere We Be Young Again (Robert Louis Stevenson)
  - Good and Bad Children
  - Looking Forward
  - Whole Duty of Children
  - At the Seaside
  - Singing
  - Rain
  - Where Go the Boats
  - The Swing
  - My Bed Is a Boat
  - Envoy
- Op. 51: Two Marches in the American Style for Orchestra (1981–1991)
- Op. 52: Samson and the Witch, Opera in 1 Act (with John Gardner) (1995)
- Op. 53: Songs from Shakespeare
  - When Daisies Pied
  - How Should I Your True Love Know
  - Where the Bee Sucks
  - Come unto These Yellow Sands
  - You Spotted Snakes
  - Orpheus with His Lute
  - Who Is Sylvia
- Op. 54: Requiescat for Violin and Orchestra (1983) – in memoriam of John Gardner
- Op. 55: 'The Wild Swans at Coole' and other songs on poems of William Butler Yeats (1986)
  - The Wild Swans at Coole
  - Brown Penny
  - Made Quiet
  - First Love
  - Remorse for Intermperate Speech
  - Tom O'Roughley
  - To a Child Dancing in the Wind
  - Two Years Later
  - When You Are Old
  - The Lake Isle of Innesfree
- Op. 56: Songs for School Children (c. 1984)
  - Some One (Walter de la Mare)
  - How Doth the Lowly Crocodile (Lewis Carroll)
  - Ariel's Song (William Shakespeare)
  - Who Has Seen the Wind (Christina Rossetti)
- Op. 57: Songbook: Miscellaneous Uncollected Songs
  - A Lover Pleads with His Friends for Old Friends (Yeats)
  - Beloved Rivers (Marjorie England) (1987–1989)
  - And That Is Life (Paul Laurence Dunbar) (1990)
  - Full Moon (Sara Teasdale)
  - The Philosopher (Millay)
  - Home-Coming (Léonie Adams)
- Op. 58: 'Dark of the Moon' for mezzo-soprano (Sara Teasdale)
  - Winter
  - September Night
  - Wisdom
  - Low Tide
  - "She Who Could Bind You"
  - Foreknown
  - At Tintagil
  - The Fountain
  - Epitaph
- Op. 59: Symphony No. 2 in D (1987–1991)
- Op. 60: Shiloh, for tenor, horn, and piano
  - The Portent
  - Misgivings
  - Malvern Hill
  - Shiloh
- Op. 61: The Shepherd's Calendar, suite for solo English Horn
- Op. 63: Heartland: A Runaway Summer Overture for Orchestra (1990)
- Op. 64: Steel Town, Capriccio for Chamber Orchestra (1990)
- Op. 65: Summer Music: Trio for Flute, Bassoon and Piano
- Op. 66: The Kentucky Suite for Orchestra
- Op. 67: St Louis Suite for Clarinet and Piano
- Op. 68: Fantasia for String Quartet
- Op. 69: Organ Preludes (1995)
- Op. 70: Songs for Our Children
- Op. 71: "Echo" and "The First Spring Day" for Soprano, Flute, Clarinet and String Orchestra
- Op. 72: Two Songs for a Christening for Soprano and Organ or Strings
- Op. 73: Heartland: September Towns
- Op. 74: Madrigals from Shakespeare (1997)
  - Under the Greenwood Tree
  - How Should I Your True Love Know
  - It Was a Lover and His Lass
  - Willow Song
  - Take, O Take Those Lips Away
  - O Mistress Mine
- Op. 75: Songbook: Miscellaneous Uncollected Songs
- Op. 80: An American Requiem (1999–2003)
- Op. 81: Introduction and Allegro for Six Cellos
- Op. 89: Two Movements Concertante for Oboe and Small Orchestra (2003)
- Op. 90: Sonata for Three Cellos and Piano (2006)
- Op. 91: Album of American Ghosts (2006)
- Op. 94: Suite Concertante for flute and string orchestra
- Op. 99: River of Time: An Opera in 2 Acts (with Jim Rodgers) (2009)
