= Lonsdale Quay Market =

Public market in North Vancouver, Canada

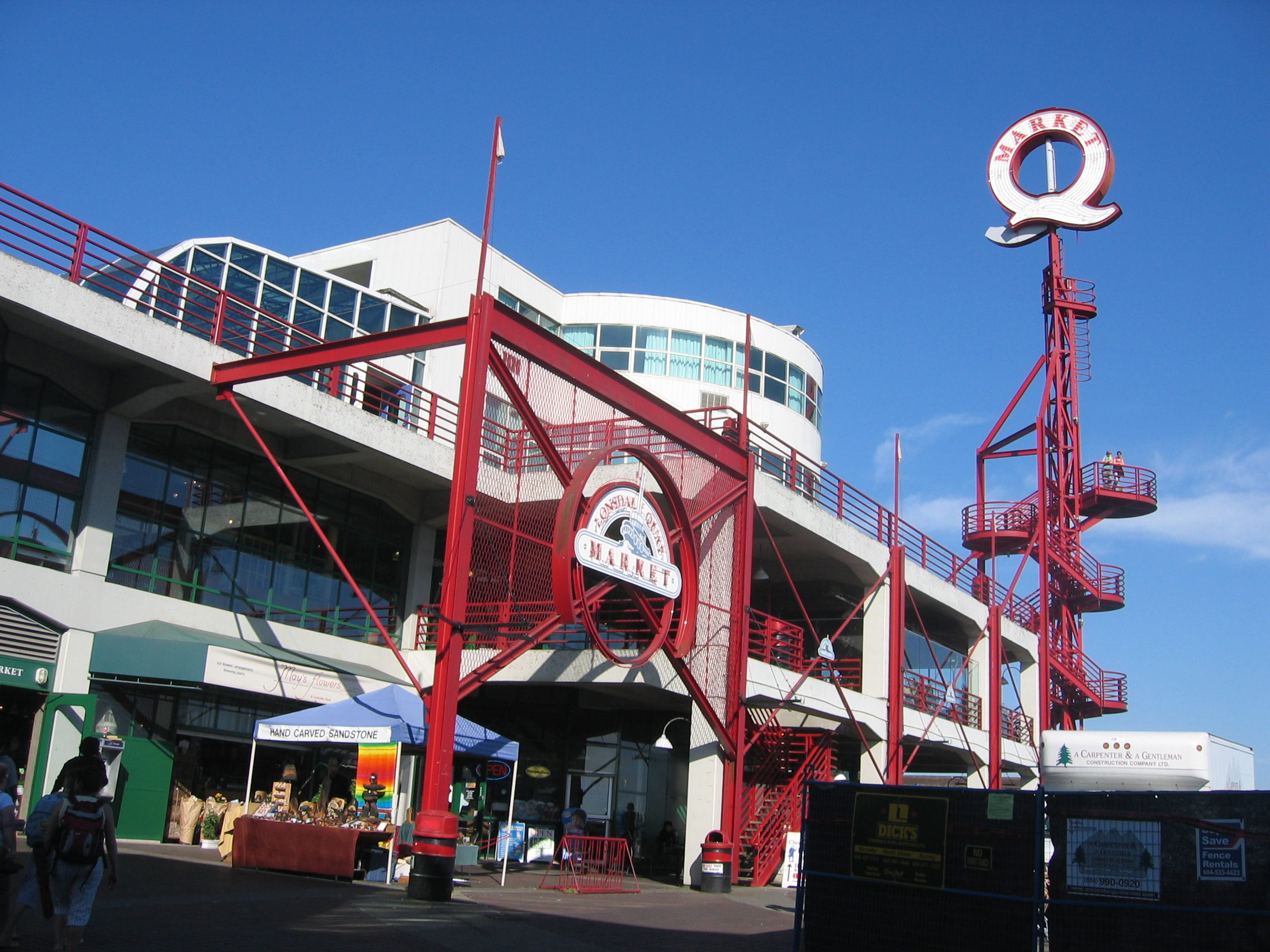
- Location: North Vancouver, British Columbia, Canada
- Coordinates: 49.310434°N 123.082778°W
- Opened: April 12, 1986; 40 years ago
- Public transit: Lonsdale Quay
- Website: lonsdalequay.com

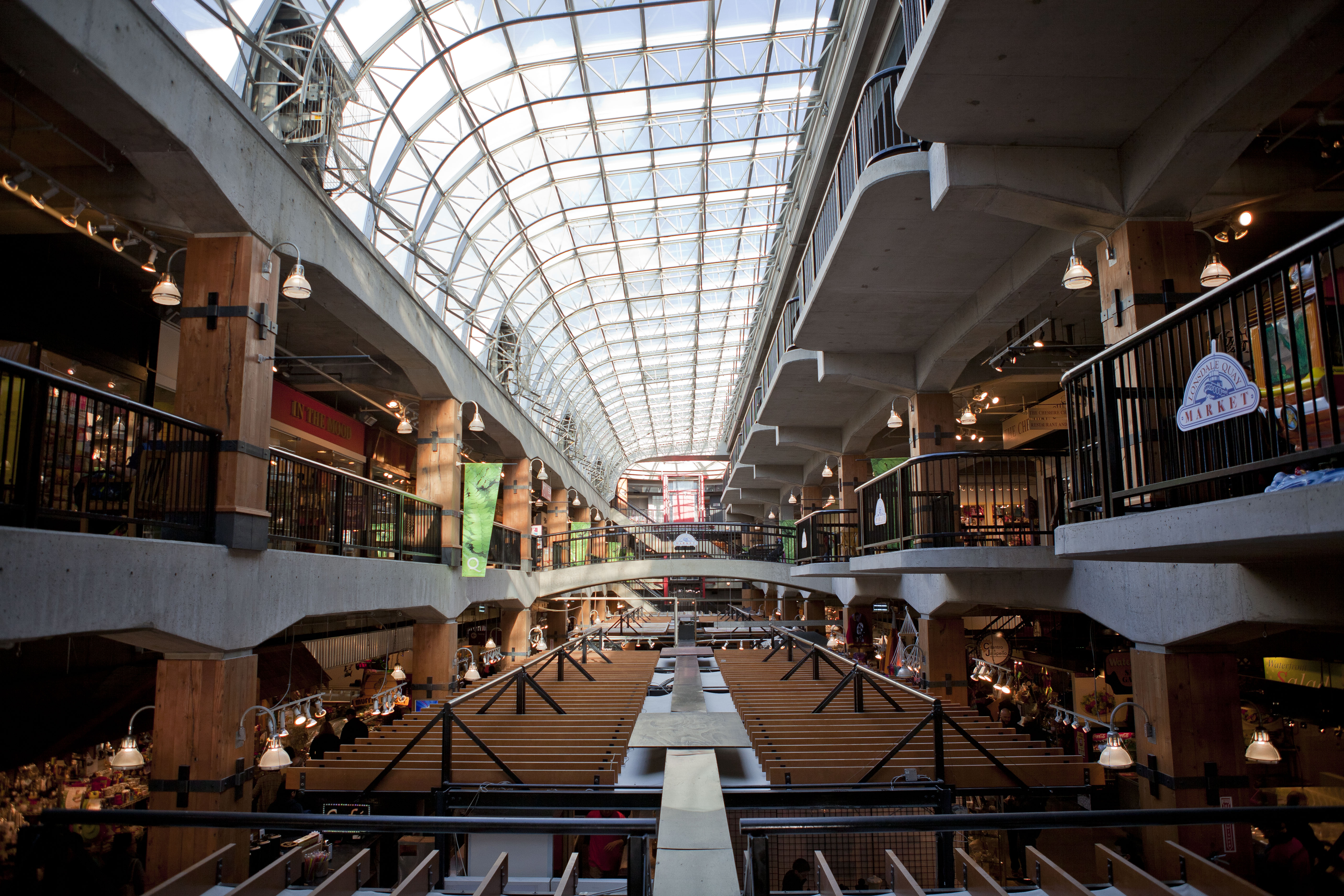
Lonsdale Quay Market interior

Lonsdale Quay Market (branded as the Quay Market & Food Hall) is a major public market and tourist destination located in the city of North Vancouver, British Columbia, Canada. The market is located at the foot of Lonsdale Avenue and is adjacent to the Lonsdale Quay SeaBus terminal and transit exchange that serves Metro Vancouver's North Shore municipalities. The headquarters for the Insurance Corporation of British Columbia is located in a neighbouring building.

== History ==
The site occupied by the market holds extensive maritime and industrial significance. During World War II, the waterfront parcel operated as the North Van Ship Repair dock—a subset of the larger Wallace Shipyards and Burrard Dry Dock area—which served as a crucial facility for wartime shipbuilding and produced a significant portion of Canada's "Victory Ships". Following a post-war contraction of local heavy industry, the waterfront area entered a period of economic stagnation.

The introduction of the TransLink SeaBus passenger ferry service in 1977 spurred public initiatives to revitalize the waterfront brownfields. The provincial government formed the Lonsdale Quay Development Corporation to transform the site into a mixed-use public market asset. The market officially opened to the public on April 12, 1986, timed to coincide with the opening of the Expo 86 World's Fair, operating as a "carnival-style" destination to capture international tourist traffic.

In 1994, Quay North Urban Development (formerly operating as Quay Property Management) bought out the remaining interests to become the sole owner and operator of the marketplace. In the 2010s, the surrounding area underwent rapid high-density residential redevelopment under the direction of local municipal housing policies.
