= Baber, West Virginia =

Unincorporated community in West Virginia, United States

- Unincorporated community
- Location within West Virginia Location within the United States
- Coordinates: 38°0′30″N 82°2′44″W
- Country: United States
- State: West Virginia
- County: Logan
- Elevation: 640 ft (195 m)
- Time zone: UTC-5 (Eastern (EST))
  - Summer (DST): UTC-4 (EDT)

Baber is an unincorporated community at the mouth of Limestone Creek along the Guyandotte River situated between the communities of Daisy and Big Creek in northern Logan County, West Virginia, United States. Baber is accessed by West Virginia Route 10 and CSX Railroad.
