= John Baber (physician) =

English physician to Charles II

Sir John Baber, M.D. (18 April 1625 – 1704), was an English physician to Charles II, often employed by the king to negotiate with puritans and other non-conformists on account of his sympathies with them.

== Life and work ==
Baber was the son of John Baber, recorder of Wells, Somersetshire, and was born on 18 April 1625. He was educated at Westminster school, London, then became a student at Christ Church, Oxford, in 1642. He graduated as a Bachelor of medicine on 3 December 1646, being admitted by virtue of the letters of Colonel John Lambert, governor of the garrison of Oxford.

He travelled abroad, studying medicine at Leyden, in the Netherlands, and on 10 November 1648 took the degree of M.D. at Angers. On his return to England he was made an M.D. at Oxford on 18 July 1650, became a candidate of the College of Physicians, London, on 4 July 1651, and a fellow of the same institution on 17 August 1657. He started to practise in London, his residence being in King Street, Covent Garden. Through the recommendation of a near neighbour, Thomas Manton, rector of St. Paul's, Covent Garden, who, with other presbyterian divines, had taken a prominent part in the restoration of Charles II, he was made physician to the king, the honour of knighthood also being conferred on him 19 March 1660.

Baber was frequently made use of by King Charles in his negotiations with the puritans. Roger North, who styled him as 'a man of finesse', stated that he was 'in possession of the protectorship at court of dissenting preachers.' In September 1669 Baber informed Manton of the king's intention to do his utmost to 'get them accepted within the establishment;' but it would appear that Charles made use of him to inspire trust in intentions which were at the best feeble and vacillating. Samuel Pepys said of Baber that he was so cautious that he would not speak in company until he was acquainted with every stranger present.

Baber died in 1704. He was married three times, and had three sons by his first marriage, but no issue by the other two marriages.
