= John Baber (footballer) =

English footballer (born 1947)

John Michael Baber (born 10 October 1947) was an English footballer. He played professionally for Charlton Athletic and Southend United between 1965 and 1971, making a total of 71 Football League appearances.
