= Ambrose Baber =

American diplomat

Edward Ambrose Baber
- Born: April 23, 1793; Buckingham County, Virginia, United States
- Died: March 19, 1846 (aged 52)
- Cause of death: accidental ingestion of cyanide
- Burial place: Macon, Georgia, United States
- Occupations: medical doctor and diplomat
- Known for: head American diplomat to the Kingdom of Sardinia (1841–1844)
- Spouse: Mary Sweet (m. 1829)
- Children: 2 sons

Edward Ambrose Baber (April 23, 1793 – March 19, 1846) was an American medical doctor and diplomat. He was the head American diplomat to the Kingdom of Sardinia from 1841 to 1844.

Baber was born in Buckingham County, Virginia. As an adult, he lived in Macon, Georgia, where he had a medical practice. He married the former Mary Sweet in 1829; they had two sons and three daughters.

Baber died due to an accidental ingestion of cyanide. His remains are buried in Macon.

Baber's Macon home is a registered historic landmark and was formerly the home to the law firm of Chambless, Higdon, Richardson, Katz & Griggs, LLP which has now relocated.

== Sources ==
- "Ambrose Baber" entry of the Baber family tree
- List of U.S. Chiefs of Mission to Italy
