= List of Northwest League stadiums =

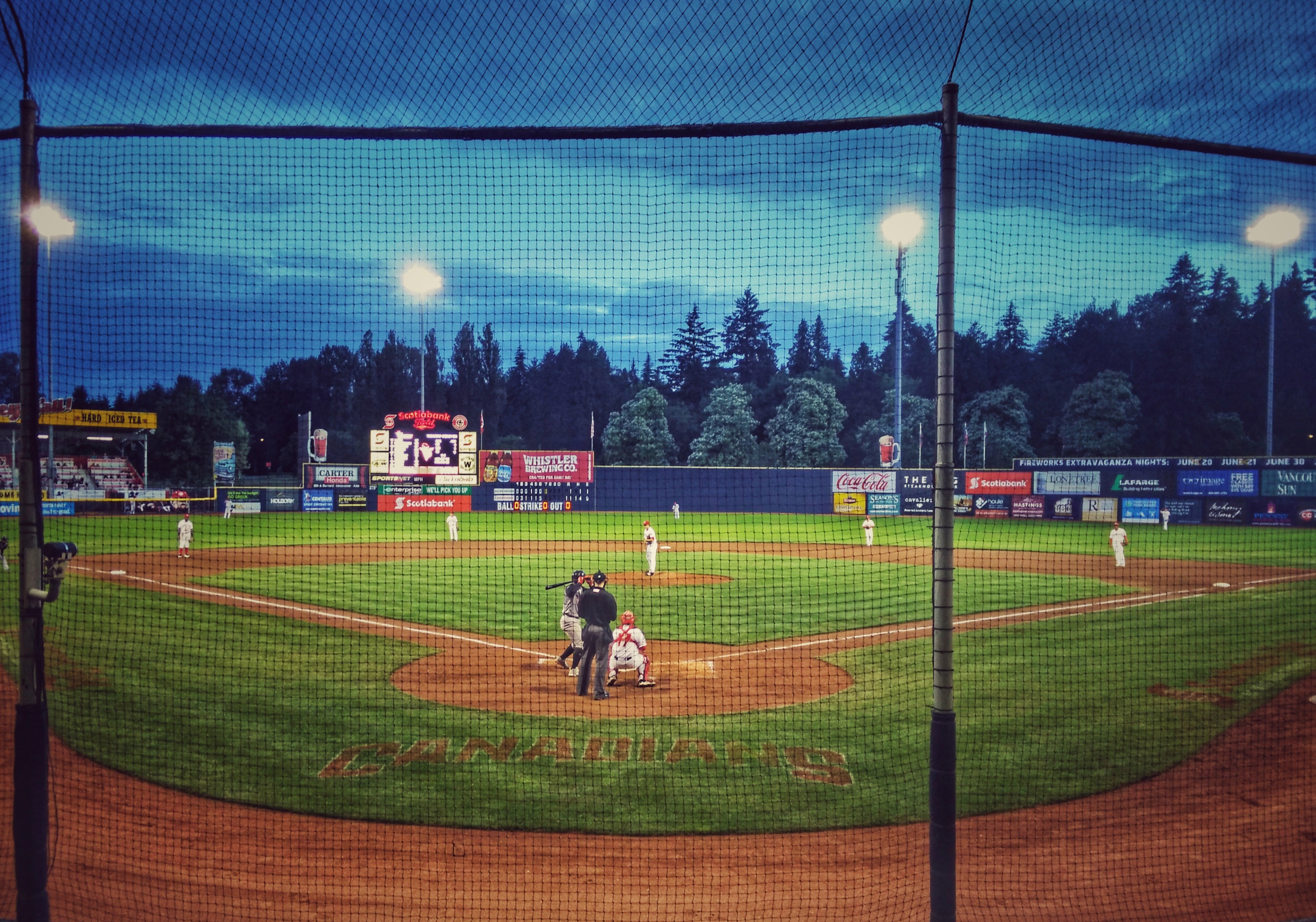
Nat Bailey Stadium was built in 1951 and is the current home of the Vancouver Canadians.

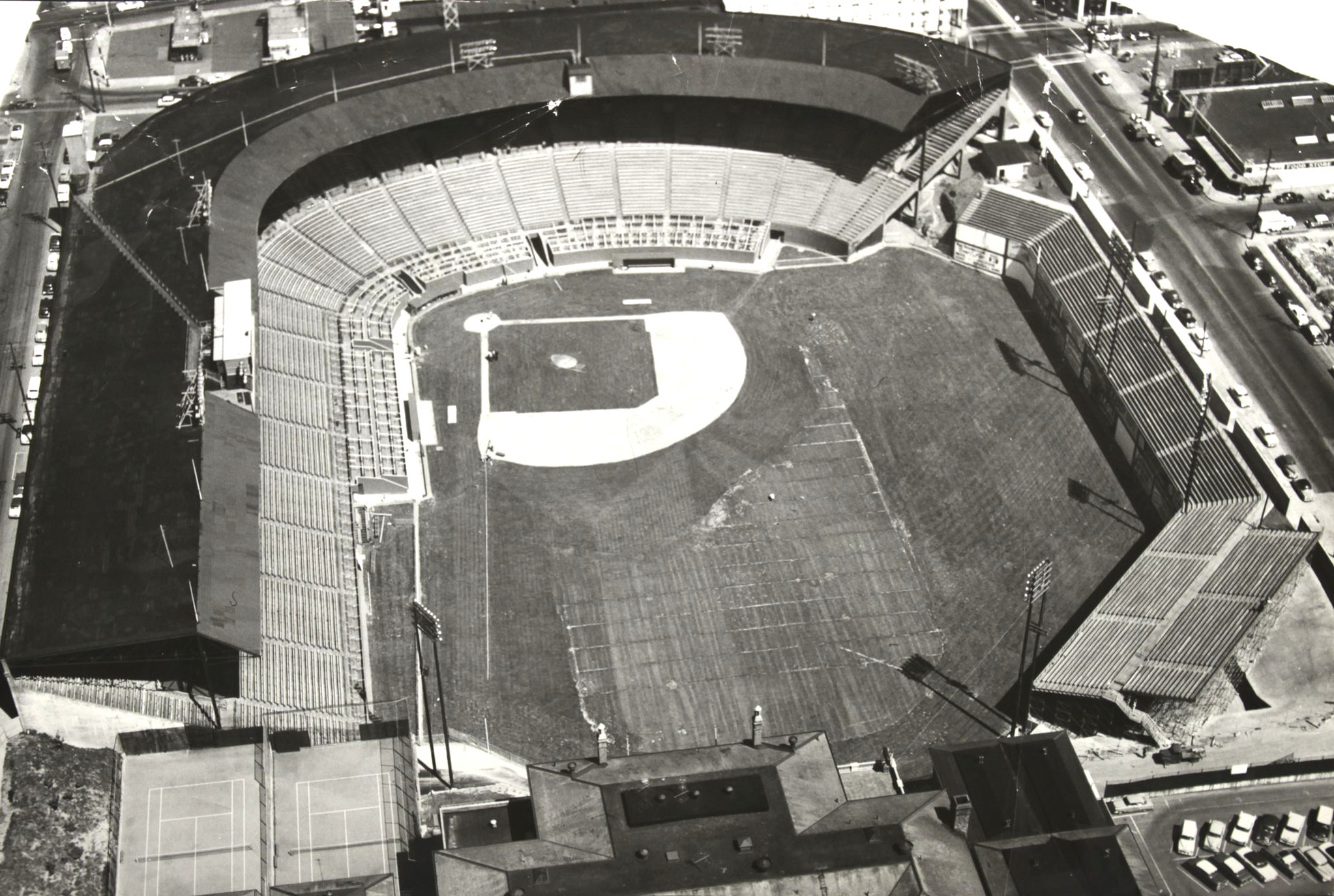
PGE Park was built in 1926 and was home to the Portland Mavericks and Portland Rockies.

There are six stadiums in use by Northwest League (NWL) baseball teams. The oldest stadium is Funko Field (1947) in Everett, Washington, home of the Everett AquaSox. The newest stadium is Hillsboro Hops Ballpark (2026) in Hillsboro, Oregon, home of the Hillsboro Hops. One stadium was built in the 1940s, two in the 1950s, and one in each of the 1990s, 2000s, and 2020s. The highest seating capacity is 6,803 at Avista Stadium in Spokane, Washington, where the Spokane Indians play. The lowest capacity is 3,654 at Gesa Stadium in Pasco, Washington, where the Tri-City Dust Devils play.

Since its founding in 1937, there have been approximately 40 stadiums located among approximately 30 municipalities used by the league, including the period when it was known as the Western International League (1937–1954). Of the stadiums with known opening dates, the oldest to have hosted NWL games was then-Athletic Park (1913) in Vancouver, British Columbia, home of the Vancouver Capilanos. Hillsboro Hops Ballpark is also the newest among all NWL stadiums. The highest known seating capacity was 25,420 at Sick's Stadium in Seattle, Washington, home of the Seattle Rainiers. The stadium with the lowest known capacity was North Bend Municipal Park in Coos Bay, Oregon, home of the Coos Bay-North Bend A's, which seated only 1,000.

== Active stadiums and map ==
Current stadium locations

Name	Team	City	State / Province	Opened	Capacity	Ref.
PK Park	Eugene Emeralds	Eugene	Oregon	2009	4,000	
Funko Field	Everett AquaSox	Everett	Washington	1947	3,682	
Hillsboro Hops Ballpark	Hillsboro Hops	Hillsboro	Oregon	2026	6,000	
Avista Stadium	Spokane Indians	Spokane	Washington	1958	6,803	
Gesa Stadium	Tri-City Dust Devils	Pasco	Washington	1994	3,654	
Rogers Field at Nat Bailey Stadium	Vancouver Canadians	Vancouver	British Columbia	1951	6,500	

=== Gallery ===
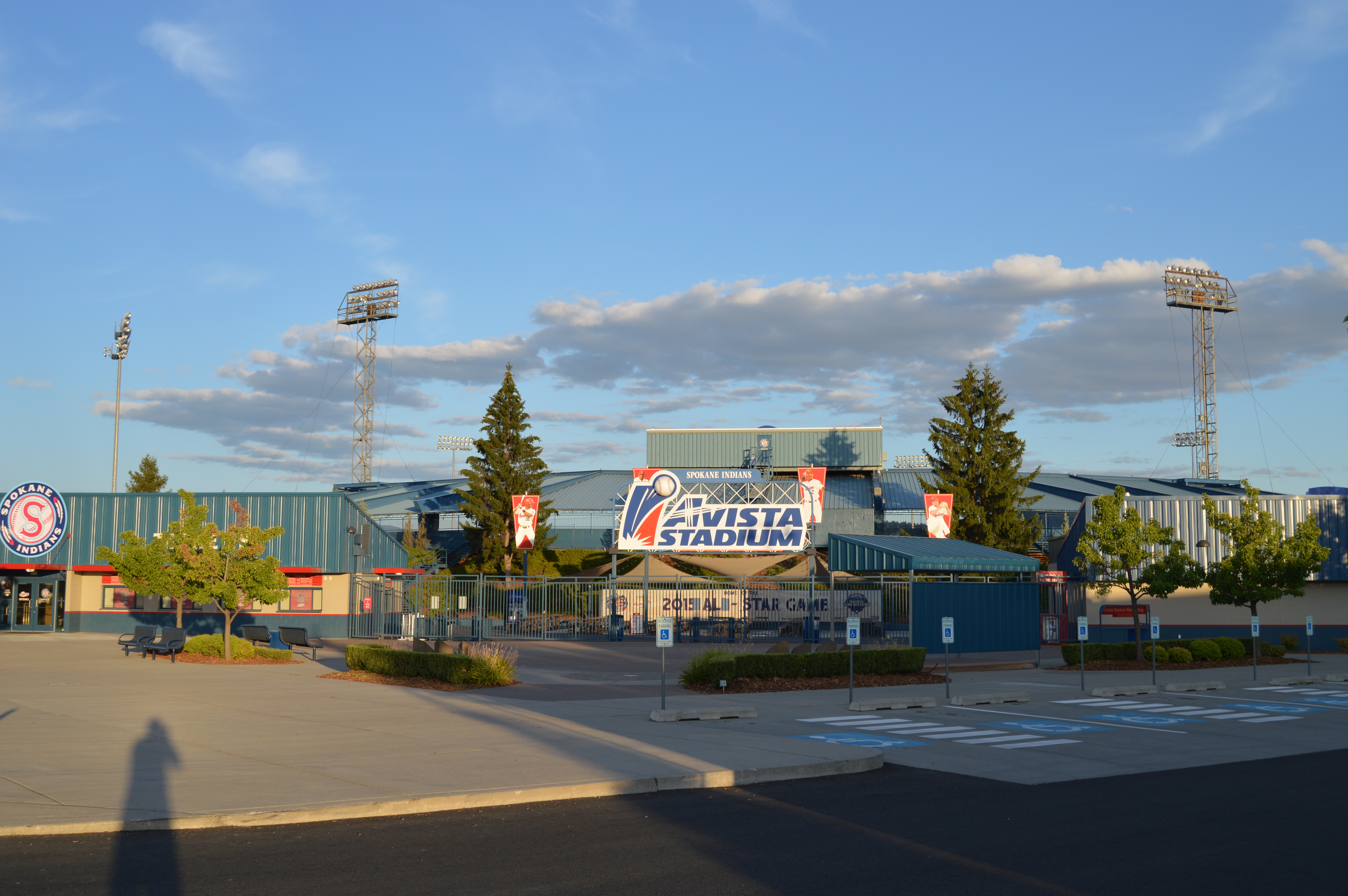
Avista Stadium (Spokane Indians)

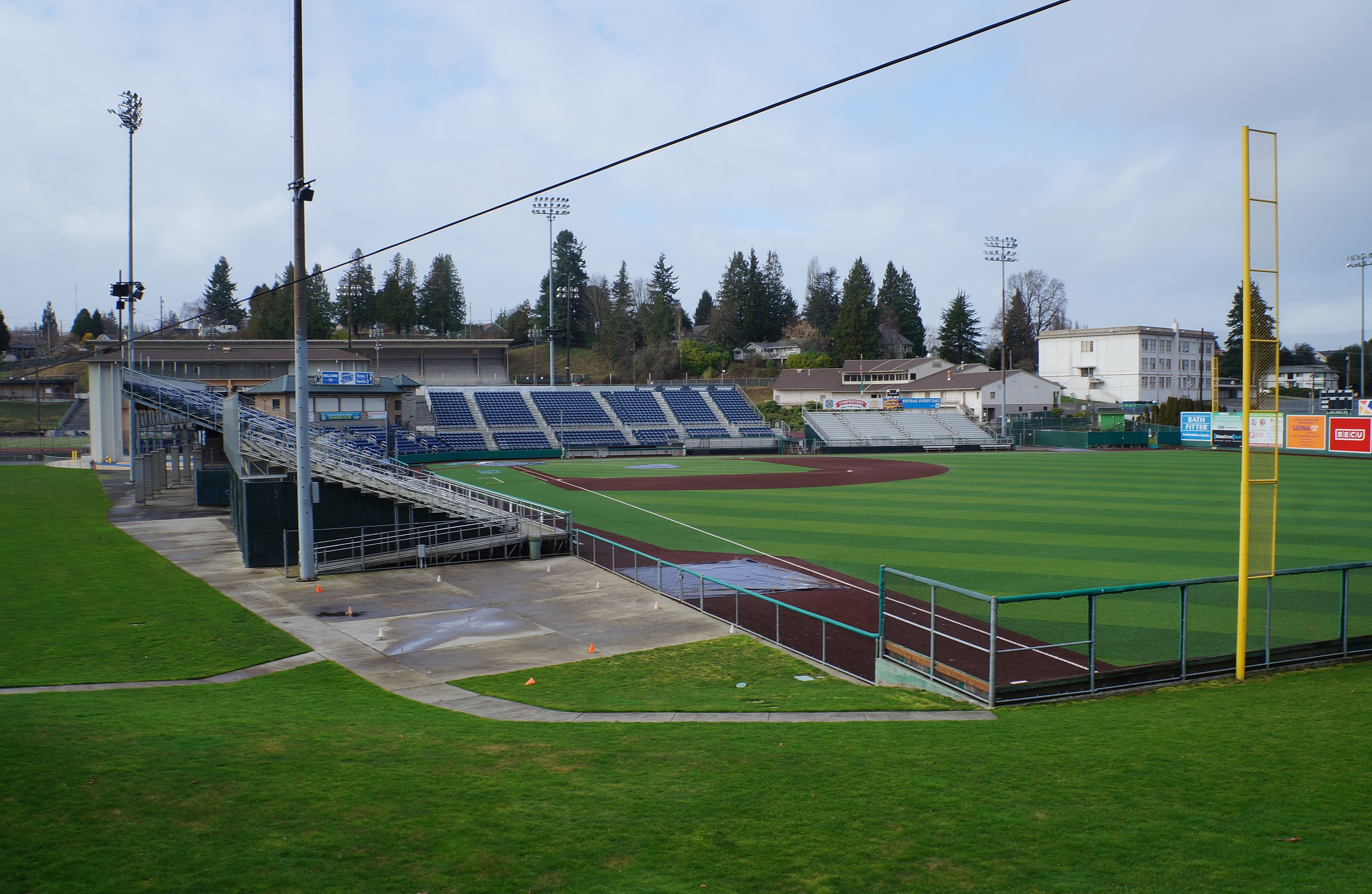
Funko Field (Everett AquaSox)

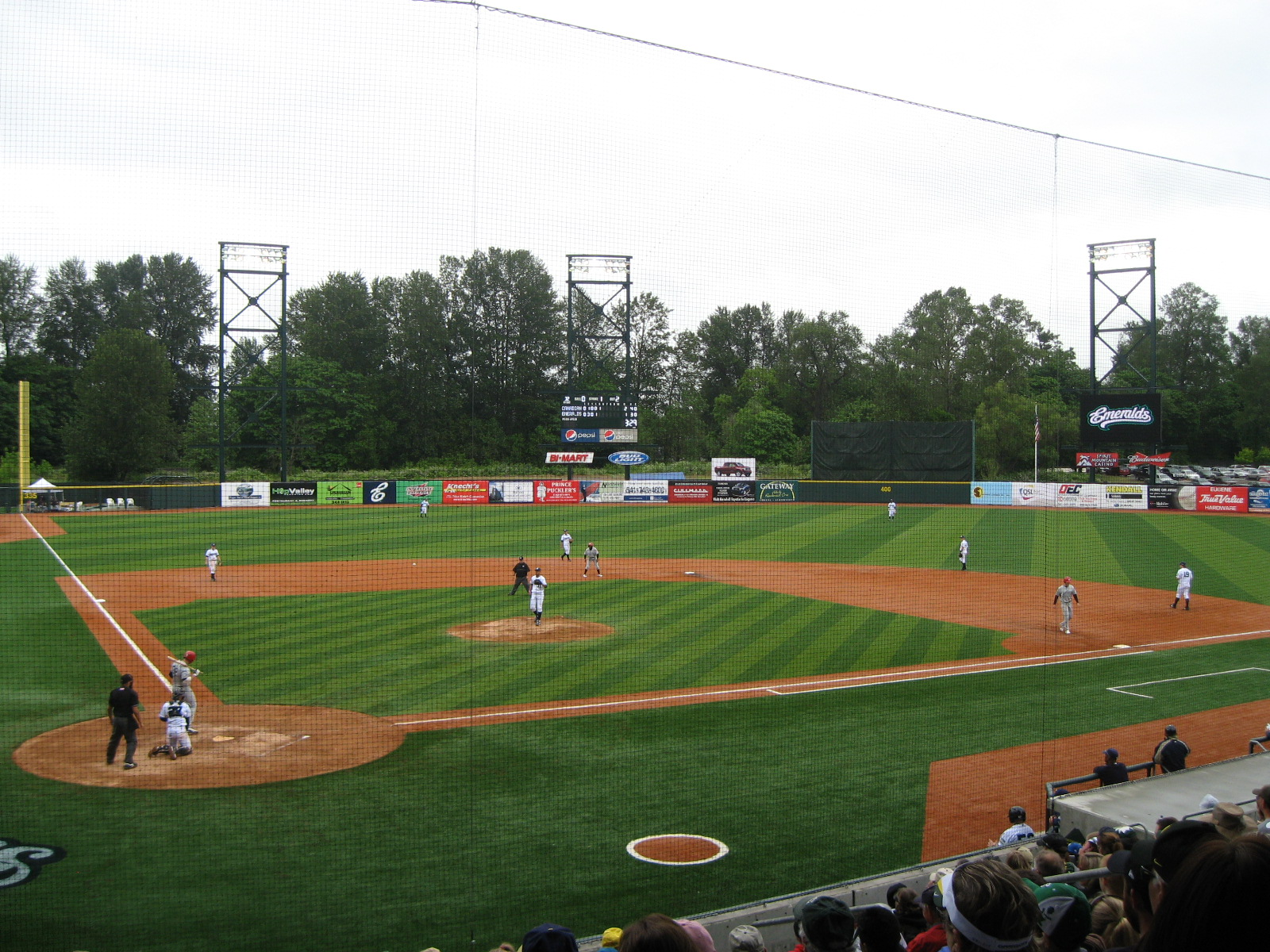
PK Park (Eugene Emeralds)

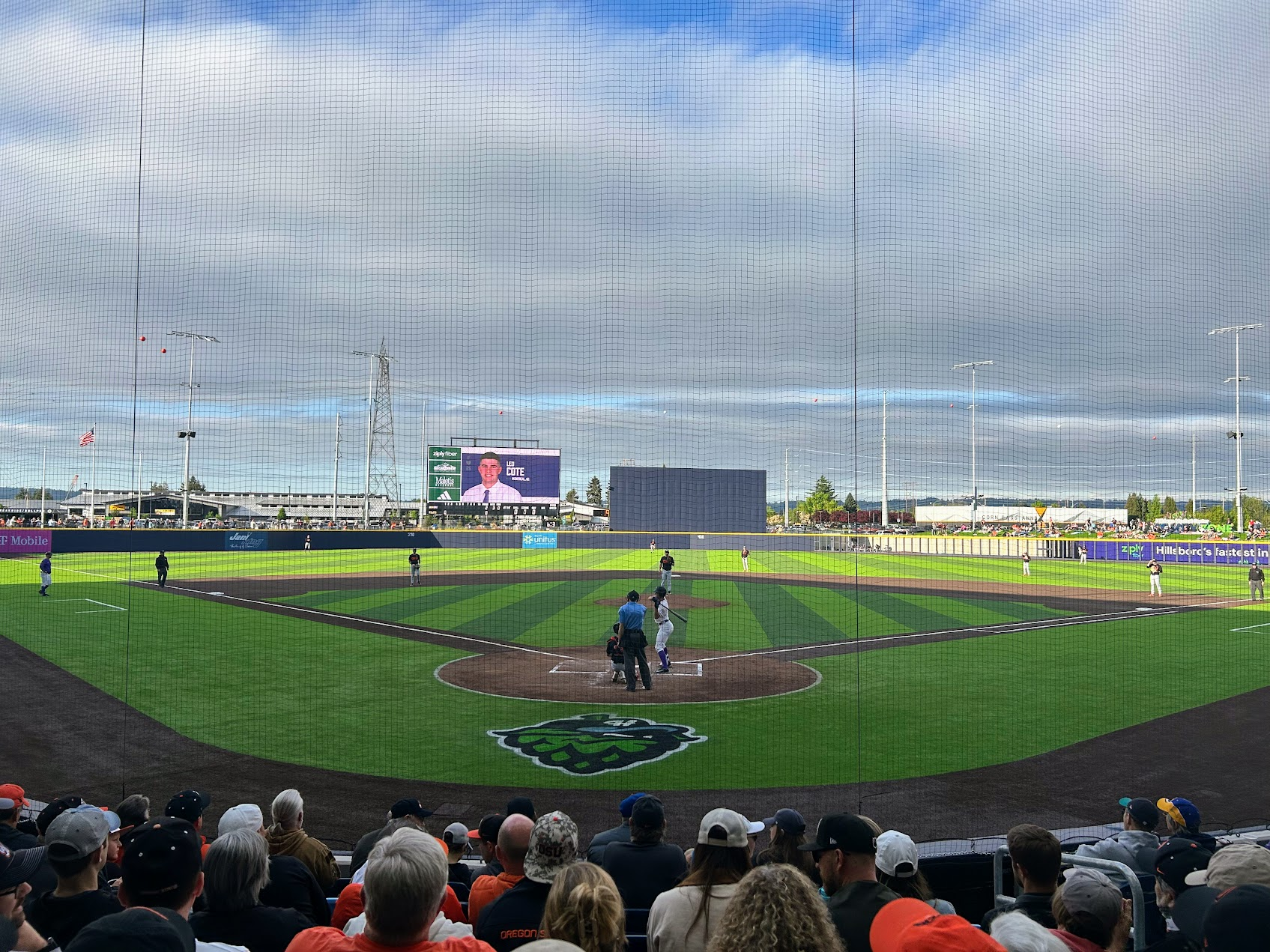
Hillsboro Hops Ballpark (Hillsboro Hops)

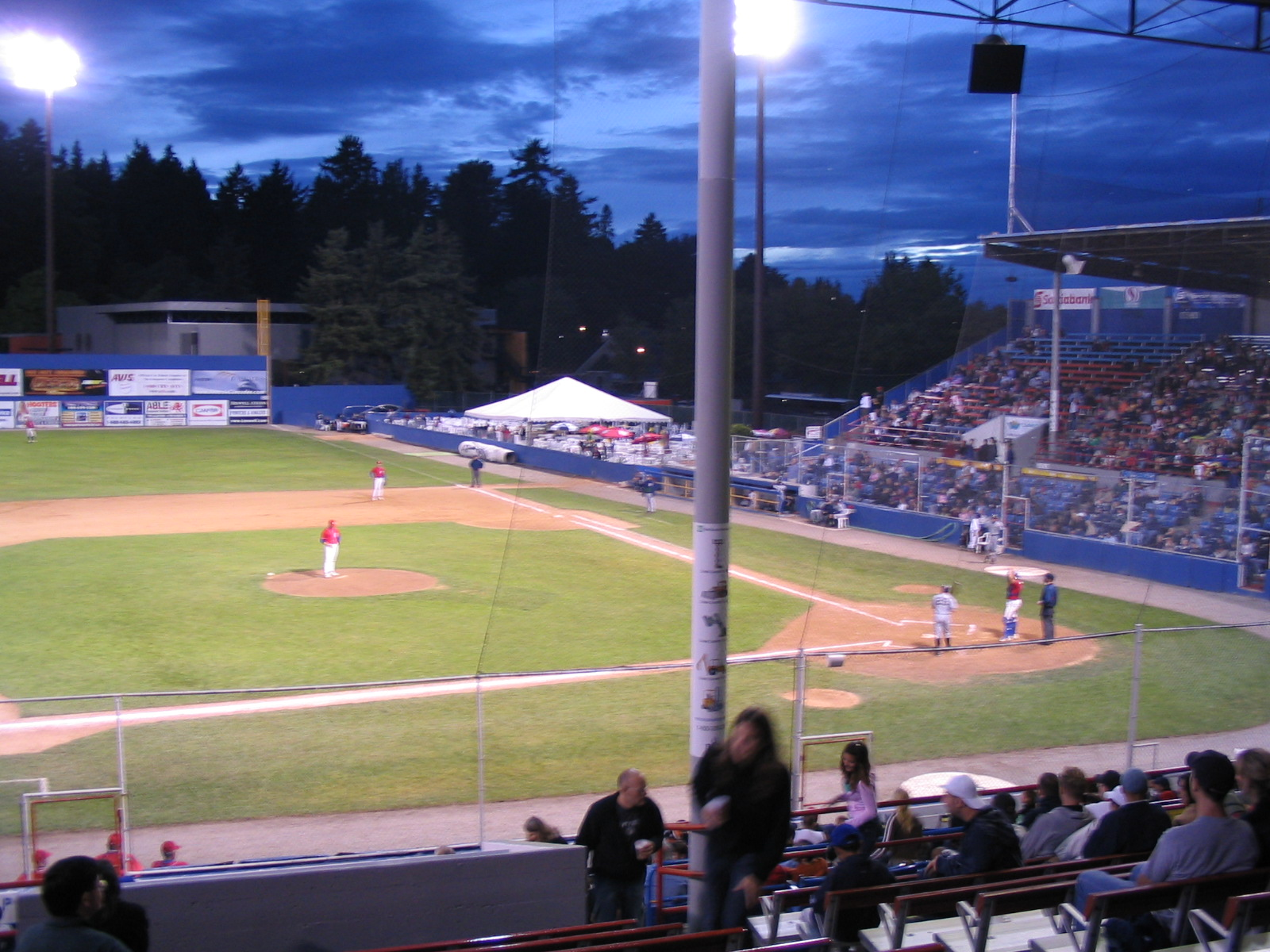
Rogers Field at Nat Bailey Stadium (Vancouver Canadians)

== All stadiums ==
Key
Name	Stadium's name in its last season of hosting NWL baseball
Opened	Opening of earliest stadium variant used for hosting NWL baseball
Capacity	Stadium's most recent capacity while hosting NWL baseball

Name	Team(s)	Locality	State	Opened	Capacity	Ref(s)
Battersby Park	Bellingham Chinooks	Bellingham	Washington		3,000	
Joe Martin Stadium (Note: Joe Martin Stadium was known as Civic Field (1973–1980).)	Bellingham Dodgers, Bellingham Mariners, Bellingham Giants	Bellingham	Washington	1964	2,200	
Vince Genna Stadium (Note: Vince Genna Stadium was known as Municipal Stadium (1970–1971).)	Bend Rainbows, Bend Timber Hawks, Central Oregon/Bend Phillies, Bend Bucks, Bend Rockies	Bend	Oregon	1946	2,850	
Borleske Stadium	Walla Walla Bears, Walla Walla Phillies, Walla Walla Islanders, Walla Walla Padres, Blue Mountain Bears	Walla Walla	Washington		2,500	
Wigle Field (Note: Wigle Field was known as Borah's Buckskin Field (1978).)	Boise A's, Boise Buckskins, Boise Hawks	Boise	Idaho		3,000	
Memorial Stadium	Boise Hawks	Boise	Idaho	1989	4,600	
Roosevelt Field	Bremerton Bluejackets	Bremerton	Washington		4,500	
Buffalo Stadium	Calgary Stampeders	Calgary	Alberta		3,500	
North Bend Municipal Park	Coos Bay-North Bend A's	Coos Bay	Oregon		1,000	
John Ducey Stadium (Note: John Ducey Stadium was known as Renfrew Park (1953–1983).)	Edmonton Eskimos	Edmonton	Alberta	1933	6,200	
Bethel Park	Eugene Emeralds	Eugene	Oregon		4,000	
Civic Stadium (Note: Civic Stadium was also known as Eugene Baseball Park.)	Eugene Emeralds	Eugene	Oregon	1938	6,800	
PK Park	Eugene Emeralds	Eugene	Oregon	2009	4,000	
Everett Memorial Sports Complex (Note: The ballpark at Everett Memorial Sports Complex is known as Funko Field.)	Everett Giants, Everett AquaSox	Everett	Washington	1947	3,862	
Olympic Stadium	Grays Harbor Ports, Grays Harbor Loggers, Grays Harbor Mets	Aberdeen	Washington	1932	7,500	
Pioneer Park	Grays Harbor Ports, Grays Harbor Loggers, Grays Harbor Mets	Aberdeen	Washington		1,500	
Ron Tonkin Field	Hillsboro Hops	Hillsboro	Oregon		4,500	
Hillsboro Hops Ballpark	Hillsboro Hops	Hillsboro	Oregon	2026	6,000	
Bengal Field	Lewiston Broncs/Lewis-Clark Broncs	Lewiston	Idaho		3,700	
Miles Field (Note: Miles Field was known as Jackson County Baseball Park (1948–1969).)	Medford Giants, Medford/Rogue Valley Dodgers, Medford A's/Southern Oregon A's/Southern Oregon Timberjacks	Medford	Oregon		2,900	
Queen's Park Stadium	New Westminster Frasers	New Westminster	British Columbia		5,804	
PGE Park (Note: PGE Park{ was known as Multnomah Stadium (1956–1969) and Portland Civic Stadium (1970–1999).)	Portland Mavericks, Portland Rockies	Portland	Oregon	1926	23,150	
George E. Waters Field	Salem Senators/Angels/Dodgers	Salem	Oregon		4,500	
Chemeketa College Field	Salem Senators/Dodgers	Salem	Oregon		2,200	
Volcanoes Stadium (Note: Volcanoes Stadium was known as Keizer Stadium (1997).)	Salem–Keizer Volcanoes	Keizer	Oregon		4,252	
Sick Stadium	Seattle Rainiers	Seattle	Washington	1938	25,420	
Avista Stadium (Note: Avista Stadium was known as Ferris Field (1937–1956), Fairgrounds Park (1958–1986), Indians Stadium (1987–1994), and Seafirst Stadium (1995–2004).)	Spokane Hawks/Indians	Spokane	Washington	1958	6,803	
Athletic Park (Note: Athletic Park was known as The Stadium, Tacoma Baseball Park, Tacoma Tiger Park (1950–1951), and is now called Peck Field.)	Tacoma Tigers	Tacoma	Washington		5,000	
Tri-City Stadium	Tri-City Braves	Kennewick	Washington		5,500	
Sanders-Jacobs Field (Note: Sanders-Jacobs Field was also known as Sanders Field).	Tri-City Braves/Atoms/Angels/A's/Padres/Triplets/Ports	Kennewick	Washington		2,500	
Fran Rish Stadium (Note: Fran Rish Stadium is also known as Bomber Bowl.)	Tri-Cities Triplets	Richland	Washington		3,000	
Gesa Stadium (Note: Gesa Stadium was also known as Tri-Cities Stadium and Posse Stadium.)	Tri-City Dust Devils	Pasco	Washington	1994	3,654	
Con Jones Park	Vancouver Maple Leafs	Vancouver	British Columbia		5,200	
Capilano Stadium (Note: Capilano Stadium was known as Athletic Park prior to 1944.)	Vancouver Capilanos	Vancouver	British Columbia	1913	6,000	
Nat Bailey Stadium (Note: Nat Bailey Stadium was known as Capilano Stadium (1946–1969).)	Vancouver Capilanos, Vancouver Canadians	Vancouver	British Columbia	1951	6,500	
Royal Athletic Park	Victoria Athletics, Victoria Tyees, Victoria Mussels	Victoria	British Columbia		4,000	
Recreation Park	Wenatchee Chiefs	Wenatchee	Washington		3,000	
Parker Field (Note: Parker Field is now called Larson Park.)	Yakima Pippins/Stars/Packers/Bears/Braves, Yakima Bears	Yakima	Washington		5,000	
Yakima County Stadium	Yakima Bears	Yakima	Washington		3,000	

=== Map ===
Northwest League stadium locations

== See also ==
- List of High-A baseball stadiums
- List of Midwest League stadiums
- List of South Atlantic League stadiums
