= Vince Genna Stadium =

Baseball park in Bend, Oregon

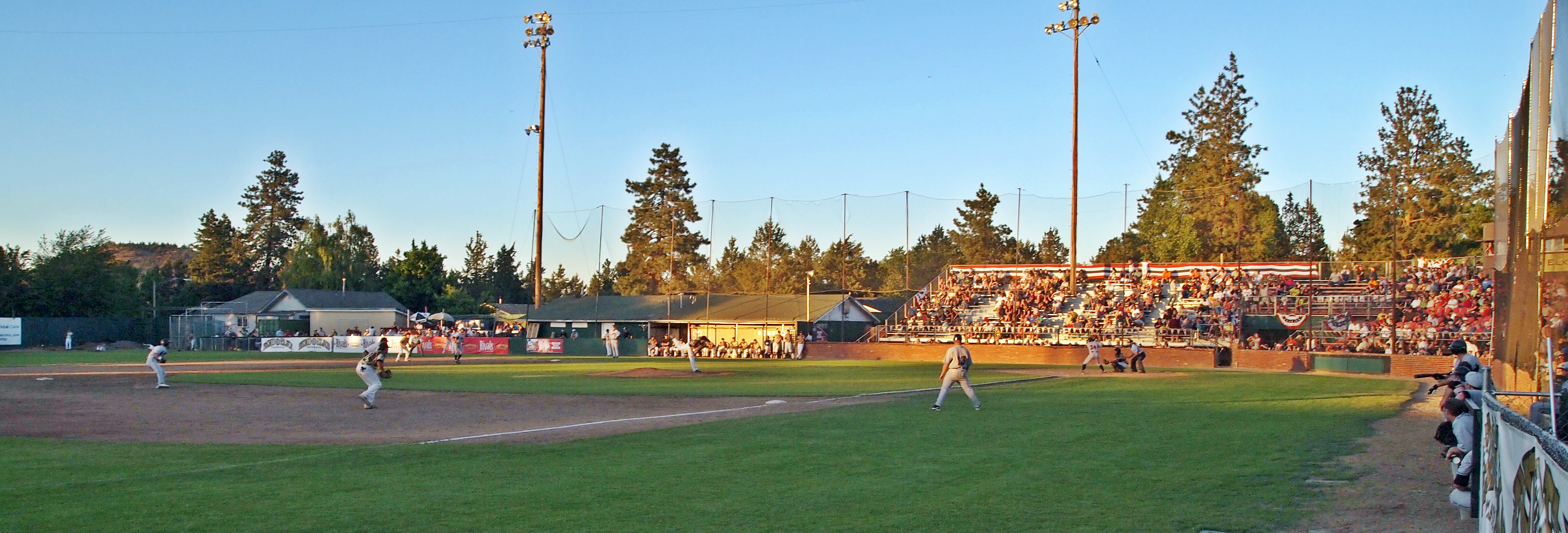
- Looking northeast at an Elks game in 2011

- Location in the United States Location in Oregon
- Interactive map of Vince Genna Stadium
- Former names: Municipal Ball Park (1964–1972)
- Address: SE 5th & Roosevelt Ave
- Location: Bend, Oregon
- Coordinates: 44.043°N 121.299°W
- Elevation: 3,700 ft (1,130 m) AMSL
- Owner: Bend Metro Park and Recreation District
- Operator: Bend Elks
- Capacity: 3,500
- Surface: Natural grass Artificial turf infield (since 2023)
- Field size: Left Field – 330 ft (101 m); Center Field – 390 ft (119 m); Right Field – 330 ft (101 m)

Construction
- Opened: 1964, 62 years ago
- Renovated: 1974
- Expanded: 2009

Tenants
- Bend Rainbows (NWL) (1970–1971); Bend Timber Hawks (NWL) (1978); Central Oregon Phillies (NWL) (1979–1980); Bend Phillies (NWL) (1981–1986); Bend Bucks (NWL) (1987–1991); Bend Rockies (NWL) (1992–1994); Bend Bandits (WBL) (1995–1998); Bend Elks (WCL) (2000–present)

Vince Genna Stadium is a baseball park in the northwest United States, located in Bend, Oregon. Opened 62 years ago in 1964, it currently hosts college summer baseball league and area American Legion games.

Originally known as "Municipal Ball Park", it was renamed 54 years ago in June 1972 for Vince Genna (1921–2007), the director of the city's parks & recreation department and former American Legion coach. When minor league baseball returned in 1978 with the Timber Hawks, Genna was an honorary first base coach in their debut game.

The stadium was the longtime home of Bend's minor league teams in the Class A-Short Season Northwest League, and later the Bend Bandits of the Western Baseball League. It is currently the home of the Bend Elks in the collegiate summer West Coast League and has a seating capacity of approximately 3,500.

In the south end of the city, the elevation of the natural grass playing field is approximately 3,700 feet (1,130 m) above sea level and is unconventionally oriented northwest; the recommended alignment of a baseball diamond (home plate to center field) is east-northeast. In 1978, the Timber Hawks had intermissions called "sun breaks" near sundown when the glare was excessive. The Angels cited the need for adequate sun screens in left field (west) as one of the reasons for breaking their affiliation with the Bend Bucks after the 1989 season.

The stadium has hosted affiliates of four major-league teams (Angels, A's, Phillies, and Rockies), four players who made the majors (Brian Barden, Julio Franco, Jacoby Ellsbury, and Eric Sogard), and one future movie star (Kurt Russell played for the Bend Rainbows in 1971).

In 1979, the Central Oregon Phillies paid the Bend Metro Park and Recreation District $9,500 for use of the ballpark for the season. In 1980, the team paid $9,700. In 2008, the Bend Elks led the WCL in league and overall attendance, averaging 1,430 fans at Genna Stadium over 21 league home games. In 2010 Genna Stadium continued to lead the WCL in total and league attendance, along with average game attendance; its record-setting season attendance exceeded 50,000.

In November of 2022, the baseball field underwent a $300,000 renovation which made the infield completely artificial turf.

The field is commonly used for the YouTube Channel “The Baseball Bat Bros” who test out baseball bats for High School and College athletes to see how new baseball bats compare to each other

== Northwest League records ==
Short-season Class A

Year	Team	MLB team	Record	Finish	Manager	Playoffs
1970	Rainbows	none ^ (2 yrs.)	39–41	3rd (t)	Charlie Silvera	
1971	Rainbows	none ^ (2 yrs.)	42–36	3rd	Ed Cecil	
No teams: 1972–1977 (six seasons)
1978	Timber Hawks	Athletics	35–37	5th	Ed Nottle	
1979	Central Oregon; Phillies	Phillies (8 yrs.)	43–28	1st	Tom Harmon	League champions
1980	Central Oregon; Phillies	Phillies (8 yrs.)	31–39	7th	P. J. Carey	
1981	Phillies	Phillies (8 yrs.)	31–39	5th	P. J. Carey	
1982	Phillies	Phillies (8 yrs.)	30–40	5th	Roly de Armas	
1983	Phillies	Phillies (8 yrs.)	32–37	6th	Jay Wild	
1984	Phillies	Phillies (8 yrs.)	38–36	4th	Ramón Avilés	
1985	Phillies	Phillies (8 yrs.)	39–35	3rd (t)	P. J. Carey	
1986	Phillies	Phillies (8 yrs.)	21–53	8th	Ed Pebley	
1987	Bucks	Co-op	33–42	5th	Mel Roberts	
1988	Bucks	Angels (2 yrs.)	38–38	5th (t)	Don Long	
1989	Bucks	Angels (2 yrs.)	33–42	6th	Don Long	
1990	Bucks	Co-op (2 yrs.)	29–47	8th	Mike Bubalo	
1991	Bucks	Co-op (2 yrs.)	30–46	7th	Bill Stein	
1992	Rockies	Rockies (3 yrs.)	43–33	1st (t)	Gene Glynn	League finals
1993	Rockies	Rockies (3 yrs.)	35–41	6th (t)	Howie Bedell	
1994	Rockies	Rockies (3 yrs.)	29–47	8th	Rudy Jaramillo	

^ The Rainbows were an affiliate of the Hawaii Islanders of the Triple-A Pacific Coast League;
the Islanders' parent clubs were the California Angels (1970), and the San Diego Padres (1971)

== Former players ==
- Bend Bandits players (1995–1998)
- Bend Rockies players (1992–1994)
- Bend Bucks players (1987–1991)
- Bend Phillies players (1981–1986)
- Central Oregon Phillies players (1979–1980)
- Bend Timber Hawks players (1978)
- Bend Rainbows players (1970–1971)
