= Bend Rainbows =

Coordinates: 44.043°N 121.299°W

- 1970–1971; Bend, Oregon

Minor league affiliations
- Class: Class A-Short Season
- League: Northwest League
- Division: South

Major league affiliations
- Previous teams: California Angels; Hawaii Islanders (PCL)

Minor league titles
- Division titles (1): 1971

Team data
- Colors: Red, navy blue, white
- Previous parks: Municipal Ball Park

The Bend Rainbows were a minor league baseball team in Bend, Oregon, from 1970 to 1971. They played in the Class A-Short Season Northwest League and were an affiliate of the Triple-A Hawaii Islanders of the Pacific Coast League, who were in turn affiliated with the California Angels. Despite their brief tenure in minor league baseball, the team is often remembered as the team for which actor Kurt Russell began his professional baseball career.

== History ==
Following the 1969 season, the Northwest League decided to expand from four teams to six teams. Coos Bay-North Bend and Bend were the two locations to receive franchises. The Hawaii Islanders, a loose affiliate of the California Angels playing at the Triple A level, sought to leverage their extensive fan base and success in recent years to make the move to the MLB. Islanders president Jack Quinn believed that legitimizing the Islanders as a potential Major League team began with establishing a farm system. Quinn secured an agreement with the Northwest League to operate the Bend franchise as an affiliate of the Hawaii Islanders. Over 90 different names were submitted for consideration for the team's mascot. The name "Rainbows" was submitted by Mrs. Dennis Huntley of Prineville, Oregon. The name was chosen due to its connection to the teams's Hawaiian parent club and as an homage to the abundant rainbow trout in the Bend area.

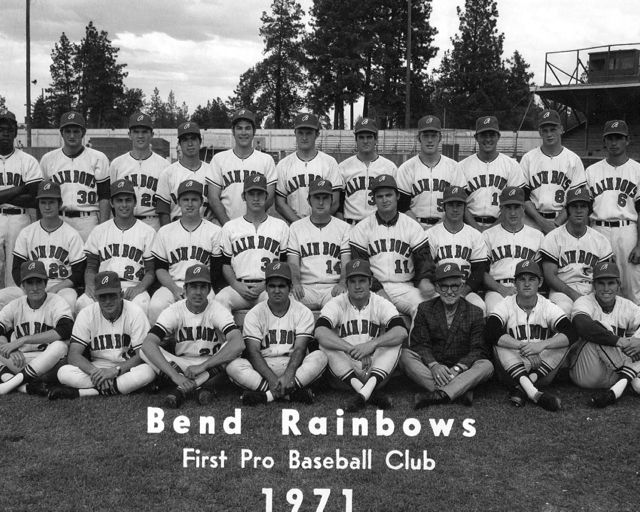
Bend Rainbows 1971 Team Photo

The Rainbows named former Major League catcher Charlie Silvera their manager for the 1970 season. During his career in the Major League Silvera won 6 World Series titles with the New York Yankees, serving as the backup catcher to Yogi Berra. The Rainbows roster was filled out by both players owned by the Islanders and by players loaned from other minor league teams. The Islanders sought to get as many players loaned to the Rainbows as possible because loaned players were paid by their parent club as opposed to being paid by the Islanders, keeping the costs of operating the Rainbows to a minimum. The 1970 roster was highlighted by Bend native and relief pitcher Ed Cecil, who was purchased from the Philadelphia Phillies before the season. Cecil was credited with the first win for the Rainbows, a 10-9 extra innings win against the Tri-City Padres.

Despite their high attendance in comparison to other Northwest League teams, the Rainbows lost over $10,000 in their first season in Bend. After the 1970 season it was unclear if the Rainbows would return to Bend for another season. The Islanders were not interested in losing money while operating their minor league team for a second season. As a result, the Islanders refused to commit to Bend unless they could get enough players loaned from other minor league teams to allow the Rainbows to turn a profit. On May 1, 1971, just over a month before the 1971 Northwest League season was set to begin, Quinn called Rainbows General Manager Ward Goodrich to let him know that the Rainbows would be returning to Bend. Because of Charlie Silvera's departure to coach in the Detroit Tigers minor league system, Cecil was named player/manager for the 1971 season.

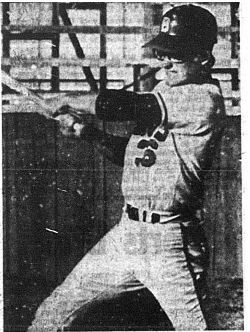
Kurt Russell batting for the Rainbows in 1971.

In an attempt to drum up more interest in the team for the 1971 season, Goodrich signed actor Kurt Russell. The 20 year old Russell had previously played in highly competitive semi-pro leagues in Los Angeles and was looking to test his skills in the minor leagues. Russell chose the Rainbows over other offers from teams with major league affiliations because the Rainbows would allow him to continue his acting career while other teams wanted him to focus on baseball immediately. Additionally, Russell's dad Bing Russell and Goodrich were old friends. When asked about his goals in both acting and baseball, Russell replied that he wanted to be the first Academy Award winner to make the Major Leagues. Russell missed the first road trip of the 1971 season as he finished filming the movie Now You See Him, Now You Don't. After joining the team in time for their home opener, Russell played the rest of the season for the Rainbows, batting .285 with one home run while starting at second base for the team. Because of his solid play, Russell was named a Northwest League All-Star Future Milwaukee Brewers and Chicago Cubs manager Tom Treblehorn also played for the team in both years of its existence.

Despite finishing first in their half of the division and the presence of Russell, the Rainbows experienced a drop in attendance in 1971, worsening the financial strain that the team was already under. Equipment and travel costs proved to be too much for the team to cover even though they did not have to pay for the salaries of the majority of their players, many of whom were loaned. Citing financial concerns, the Islanders shifted their affiliation to Walla Walla after the 1971 season and were named the Walla Walla Islanders,. The Bend franchise was sold and moved to Seattle, becoming the Rainiers. The Northwest League returned to Bend in 1978 with the Timber Hawks for one season, then continued through 1994, with the Phillies (1979–86), Bucks (1987–91), and Rockies (1992–94). Today, the Bend Elks, a collegiate wood bat baseball team in the West Coast League, play at the same stadium as the Rainbows did and carry on the tradition of baseball in Bend. Russell played for Walla Walla during the 1972 season and was moved up to the Double-A El Paso Sun Kings in 1973. Russell tore his rotator cuff in a collision while playing for El Paso and was forced to retire from baseball. He also made a brief appearance at designated hitter for the Portland Mavericks, a team owned by his father, in 1974.

== Ballpark ==
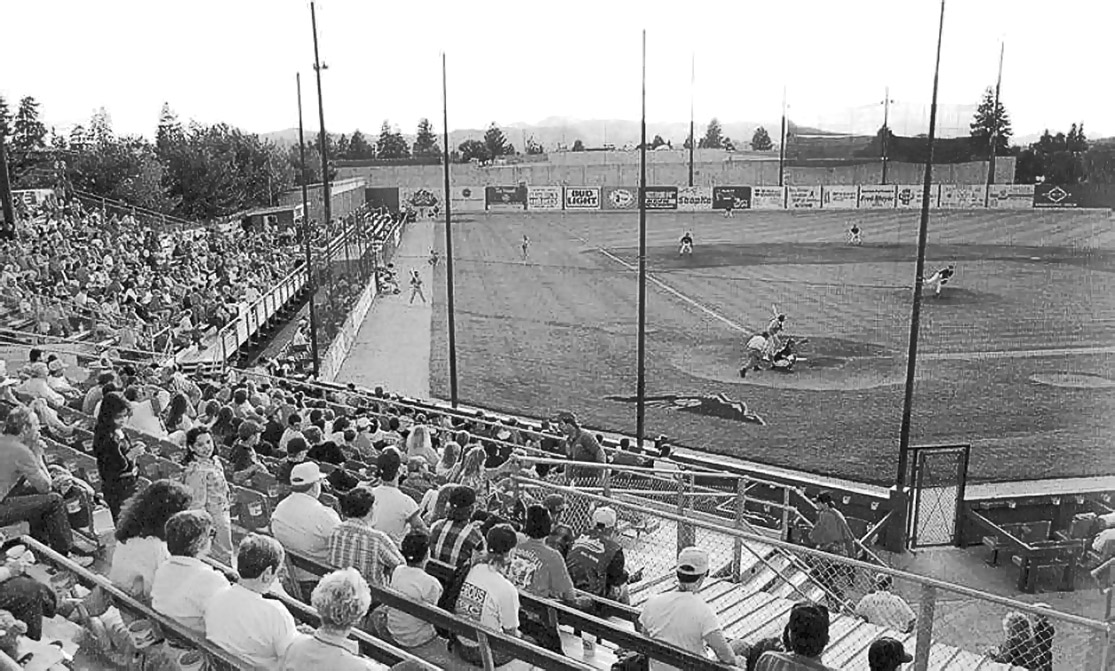
Vince Genna Stadium, formerly Municipal Stadium, during a 1992 Bend Rockies game.

The Rainbows played their home games at Municipal Ball Park in the south end of Bend, today's Vince Genna Stadium. Vince Genna was the director of Bend's Parks & Recreation Department and as such was instrumental in bringing the Rainbows to Bend. The stadium was renamed in 1972, just one year after the Rainbows departure.

== Season-by-season record ==
Season	PDC	Division	Finish	Wins	Losses	Win%	Postseason	Manager	Attendance
Bend Rainbows
1970	HAW	South	2nd	39	41	.488		Charlie Silvera	22,049
1971	HAW	South	1st	42	36	.538	NWL runner-up by virtue of record	Ed Cecil	21,677

Division winner	League champions

Preceded by Expansion franchise	Northwest League franchise 1970-1971	Succeeded by Seattle Rainiers
