= Grays Harbor Ports =

- (1976); Hoquiam, Washington

Minor league affiliations
- Class: Short-season A
- League: Northwest League

Team data
- Colors: Royal blue, white
- Ballpark: Olympic Stadium

The Grays Harbor Ports was the first name of the minor league baseball team that represented the communities of Grays Harbor, Washington, Hoquiam, Washington and Aberdeen, Washington. Grays Harbor played as members of the Class A Short Season Northwest League in 1976.

== History ==
Owned and managed by the Stockton Ports' former owner and manager Carl W. Thompson, Sr., the team had a record of 26-46, being worst in the league. Season attendance at Hoquiam's Olympic Stadium was fourth in the seven-team Northwest League at 28,842. The Ports' star pitcher Barry Biggerstaff (9-7, 3.44) led the league in almost every counting category with 17 starts, 15 complete games, 3 shutouts (having tied for the lead), 144 innings, 138 hits, 77 runs, 55 earned runs and 123 strikeouts.

After Thompson sold the team in 1977, the Ports became the Grays Harbor Loggers. Two years later, the team changed their name to the Grays Harbor Mets, playing as an affiliate of the New York Mets. In 1980, the franchise was once again the Grays Harbor Loggers for the team's final season.

== Ballpark ==
The Ports played at Olympic Stadium, located at 101 28th Street, Hoquiam, Washington. The facility is still in use today.

== Notable alumni ==
- Tommy Jones (1976)
