= Victoria Mussels =

Victoria Mussels Baseball Club
- (1978 - 1979); Victoria, British Columbia

Minor league affiliations
- Class: Class A Short Season
- League: Northwest League
- Division: North

Major league affiliations
- Team: Independent

Team data
- Colors: Navy Blue; Orange; White
- Ballpark: Royal Athletic Park
- Owner(s)/ Operator(s): Jim and Lynn Chapman, Don Rogelstad & Robert L. Peden Nov. 79
- General manager: Lynn Chapman

The Victoria Mussels were a minor league baseball team located in British Columbia, Canada. The Mussels were members of the short-season Class A Northwest League from 1978 to 1979. Besides the Mussels, the other teams in the 1978 North Division were the Bellingham Mariners, Grays Harbor Loggers and the Walla Walla Padres. The South Division consisted of the Bend Timberhawks, Salem Senators, Eugene Emeralds and the Boise Buckskins. Jim Chapman managed the team in 1978 and played infield while Don Rogelstad served as the pitching coach along with pitching for the Mussels in 10 starts.

Prior to owning the Mussels, both players during the early 70's played in the MLB minor system where Jim rose to AAA in 1973 with the Peninsula Whips of the International League and Don pitched in the New York Yankees farm system in 1972 with the Fort Lauderdale Yankees of the A class Florida State League. The 1978 season record ended at 29–40 with an attendance of 10,103 or an average of 288 fans per 35 home games.

In the 1979 season the North Division teams were the Victoria Mussels, Bellingham Mariners, Grays Harbor Mets and the Walla Walla Padres. The South Division consisted of the Central Oregon Phillies (replacing the Bend Timberhawks), Salem Senators, Medford A's(replacing the Boise Buckskins) and the Eugene Emeralds. In the 79 season the owners formed a partnership with Van Schley, an independent baseball entrepreneur from Texas/California who provided 16 players and his manager, Bill Bryk and coach Chris Gandy and covered the cost of the payroll for the team in exchange for the player contracts for each player which could be sold to MLB to recover his cost. Van Schley even brought along Bill Murray to liven up the crowd as a guest base coach and cheerleader.

Chapman and Rogelstad stepped away from their on-the-field roles to concentrate on promoting the team; along with Jim's brother Lynn, to a very hardball sleepy Victoria.

Bryk's Mussels caught wind in the second half of 1979 winning 24 of their final 36 games finishing one game out of first with a 41–31 record.

During the season the Mussels found a gem in knuckleball pitcher Tom Candiotti (the CandyMan) earning a 5–1 record & %.833. After the Mussels he moved on to AAA in 1983–85 with the Vancouver Canadians of the Pacific Coast League earning an above %.600. He later made his MLB debut in 1983 as one of the first to make a comeback from Tommy John elbow surgery. He went on to play for the Brewers, Indians, Blue Jays, Athletics and Dodgers. He threw his final pitch in July 1999 at age 41. Since 2013 the Candyman has been a television and radio analyst for the Arizona Dianmondbacks

Notables from the 1979 Mussels with a winning %.750 R-pitcher Edward Koziol, R-pitcher Roy Moretti from Victoria with a %.545, dependable southpaw 61 RBI hitter Emil Drzayich. Both Drzayich and Koziol were selected for the All-STAR team of the Northwest League

Other notables from the 1978 Mussels were Dale Mohoric R-pitcher with %.545 who rose to AAA in 1981 with the Pacific Coast League Portland Beavers and finished out in 1990 with the Indianapolis Indians of the American Association of Professional Baseball, 3rd baseman Danny Gans with 27 RBI's, R-pitcher Roy Moretti from Victoria with a pitching %.545 and hard driving southpaw 42 RBI hitter and outfielder Paul Kirsch who ended his career in AA in 1983 with the Waterbury Reds of the Eastern League (1938–2020) and southpaw pitcher Dave Cheadle, reaching AAA in 1976 with the Richmond Braves of the International League.

After the 1979 season ended the Chapmans sold the Mussels assets (including logos, equipment and copyrights) to Nanaimo/Parksville real estate builder/developer Robert L. Peden formally from the Victoria sports family of the early 20th century. The name was changed to "The Victoria Blues Baseball Club" for the upcoming 1980 season with more to follow on the Blues Wikipedia page

The 1979 season record ended at 41–31 with an attendance of 8,073 or an average of 224 fans over 36 home games. The 1980 Blues season was much better.
