= Bend Rockies =

Coordinates: 46.077°N 118.336°W

- 1992–1994; Bend, Oregon

Minor league affiliations
- Class: Class A Short Season
- League: Northwest League
- Division: South

Major league affiliations
- Previous teams: Colorado Rockies

Minor league titles
- Division titles (1): 1992

Team data
- Colors: Purple, black, silver, white
- Mascot: Bucky Buck
- Ballpark: Vince Genna Stadium

The Bend Rockies were a minor league baseball team that played in Bend, Oregon. The Rockies were members of the Class A-Short Season Northwest League for three years, from 1992 through 1994 and were affiliated with the Colorado Rockies. Prior to 1995 season, the franchise relocated to Portland, where they continued play as the Portland Rockies through 2000.

== History ==
Following two seasons operating as a co-op club, the Bend franchise signed player development contract with the expansion Colorado Rockies. Bend was the first affiliate for the Colorado, who would not begin play until the following season in 1993. Bend, who had been named the Bucks for the past five years, changed their moniker to mirror their parent club. The Bend Rockies began play on June 16, 1992.

The Rockies posted a record of 43–33 (.566) in their first regular season under manager Gene Glynn to win the south division title. Bend faced the Bellingham Mariners for the 1992 league championship, but were swept in two games by the Baby M's in the best-of-three series.

After reaching the peak of the Northwest League in their inaugural season, Bend was unable to match the same level of success. The Rockies posted consecutive last place division finishes in 1993 and 1994, the club's last in Bend. Portland had been vacant since autumn 1993, when owner Joe Buzas moved the Portland Beavers of the Class AAA Pacific Coast League (PCL) to Salt Lake City (and became the Buzz). With Oregon's largest city open, the franchise opted to fill the void by relocating. Since the departure of the Rockies to Portland, affiliated professional baseball has yet to return to central Oregon. The only professional team to play in Bend since was the Bend Bandits of the Western Baseball League; the Bandits folded in 1998.

== Ballpark ==
The Rockies played at Vince Genna Stadium in Bend.

== Identity ==
Initially, owner Jack Cain wanted to maintain the Bucks name; at the insistence of the Colorado Rockies general manager Bob Gebhard, Bend adopted the nickname of their parent club. The team's colors were purple, black, silver, and white and their uniforms were nearly identical to what the big club Rockies would wear with the exception of pinstripes. The new identity for Bend was an instant success as the club sold more merchandise on opening night than the Bucks had sold in the entire previous season.

== Season-by-season record ==
Season	PDC	Division	Finish	Wins	Losses	Win%	Postseason	Manager	Attendance
Bend Rockies
1992	COL	South	1st	43	33	.566	Lost to Bellingham in championship series 2-0	Gene Glynn	58,777
1993	COL	South	4th	35	41	.461		Howie Bedell	60,612
1994	COL	South	4th	29	47	.381		Rudy Jaramillo	69,225

Division winner	League champions

== Former players ==
- Bend Rockies players (1992–1994)

Preceded by Bend Bucks	Northwest League franchise 1992–1995	Succeeded by Portland Rockies
