= Bend Bucks =

- 1987–1991; Bend, Oregon

Minor league affiliations
- Class: Class A Short Season
- League: Northwest League

Major league affiliations
- Previous teams: California Angels (1988-1989)

Team data
- Colors: Red, navy blue, gold, white
- Mascot: Bucky Buck (1987–1991)
- Ballpark: Vince Genna Stadium

The Bend Bucks were a minor league baseball team located in Bend, Oregon. The Bucks were members of the Class A Short Season Northwest League from 1987 to 1991.

== History ==
Following the 1986 season the Philadelphia Phillies ended their affiliation with Bend after eight years. Despite losing their agreement, baseball returned to Bend for the 1987 season. The club held a name the team contest and of the roughly sixty entries the nickname Bucks was selected. The team played as a co-op composed of prospects from the Dodgers, Padres, Pirates, and Rangers along with members of the Phillies including manager Mel Roberts.

After playing their first year as a co-op team, Bend signed a player development contract with the California Angels. The Bucks first season with the Angels would be their best as the team posted a record of 38-38. Two years into a three-season agreement the Angels terminated their affiliation with Bend on the grounds of poor conditions at Vince Genna Stadium. The Angels moved their short season affiliation to Boise. Bend was again without a parent club. In 1990 the Bucks roster consisted of players from several organizations, including the Athletics, Phillies, and Giants. The following year was much of the same roster composition with nine organizations were represented on the 1991 team managed by Bill Stein.

After playing two seasons as a co-op the franchise inked an agreement with the Colorado Rockies and subsequently changed their name to the Bend Rockies.

== Ballpark ==
The Bucks played at Vince Genna Stadium located in Bend, Oregon.

== Identity ==
In changing their name to the Bucks, the club adopted new colors. The Bend Bulletin wrote that the team colors would be navy blue and red, with home uniforms and hats looking similar to those worn by the Boston Red Sox. Upon signing a working agreement with the Angels in 1988, gold was incorporated into the color scheme.

== Season-by-season record ==
Season	PDC	Division	Finish	Wins	Losses	Win%	Postseason	Manager	Attendance
Bend Bucks
1987		North	2nd	33	42	.440		Mel Roberts	36,131
1988	CAL	South	2nd	38	38	.500		Don Long	43,587
1989	CAL	South	4th	33	42	.434		Don Long	40,526
1990		South	4th	29	47	.382		Mike Dubalo	40,849
1991		South	2nd	30	46	.395		Bill Stein	47,018

Division winner	League champions

== Former players ==
Bend Bucks players (1987–1991)

Preceded by Bend Phillies	Northwest League franchise 1987–1991	Succeeded by Bend Rockies
