= Gene Glynn =

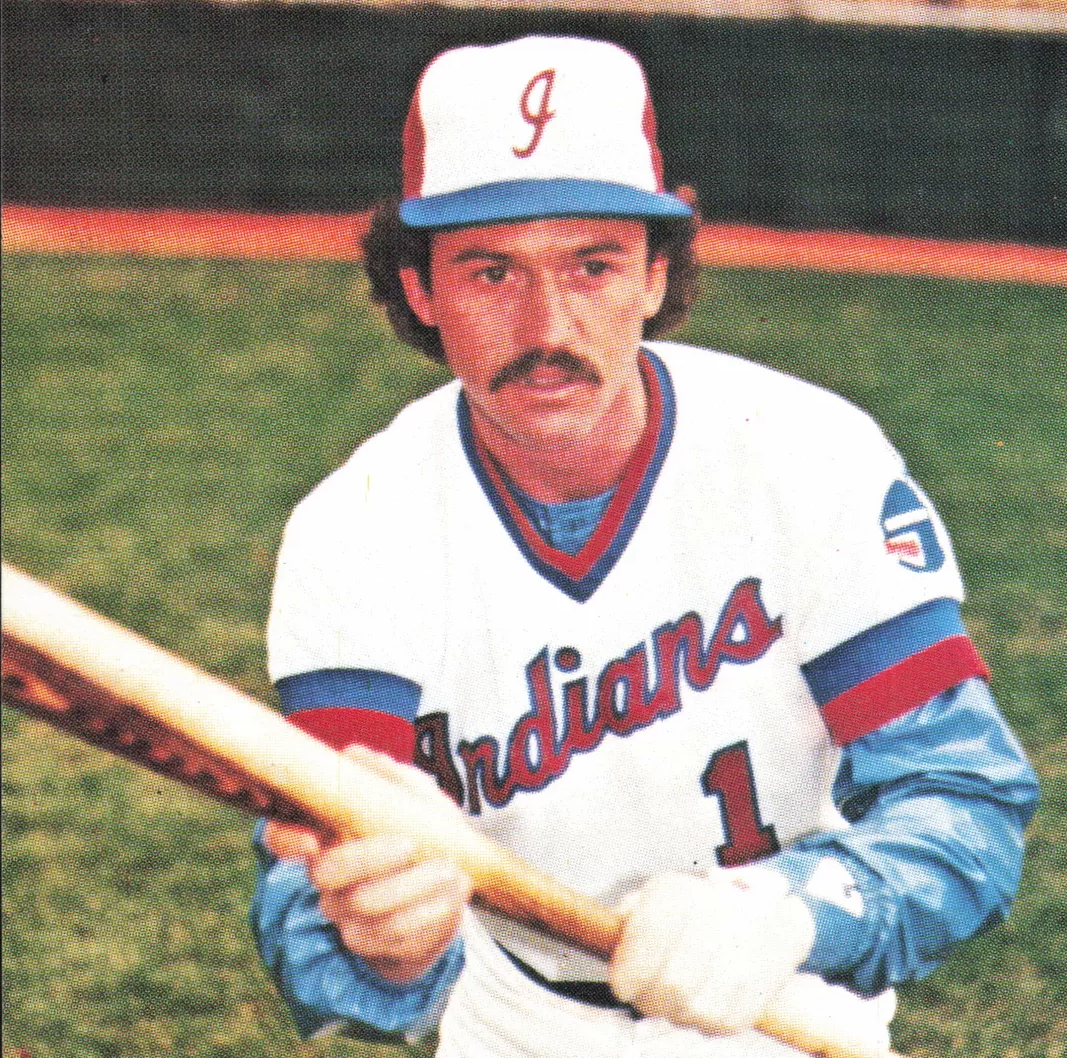
- Glynn with the Indianapolis Indians c. 1984
- Coach
- Born: September 22, 1956 (age 69); Waseca, Minnesota, U.S.
- Bats: Right Throws: Right

Teams
- As coach: Colorado Rockies (1994–1998); Montreal Expos (1999); Chicago Cubs (2000–2002); San Francisco Giants (2003–2006); Minnesota Twins (2015–2018); Miami Marlins (2019)

Eugene Patrick Glynn (born September 22, 1956, at Waseca, Minnesota) is an American professional baseball coach and a former minor league manager and second baseman. He was the 2019 infield and baserunning coordinator of the Miami Marlins of Major League Baseball, and previously served as third base coach of the Minnesota Twins from 2015–18. He also has held coaching positions with four other MLB teams. As an active player, he stood 5 feet 10 inches (1.78 m) tall, weighed 155 pounds (70 kg), and threw and batted right-handed.

Glynn graduated from Waseca High School and Mankato State University (now Minnesota State University, Mankato), where he starred in both baseball and basketball. He was Minnesota's first "Mr. Basketball" in 1975.

Glynn was signed as a non-drafted free agent by the Montreal Expos in 1979 and played seven seasons in Montreal's farm system, including parts of three campaigns (1982–84) at the Triple A level. His rookie season, in the 1979 New York–Penn League, was his best, with 36 runs batted in in 64 games played, 71 runs scored, and a batting average of .296. He managed five seasons (1987–88; 1990–92) in Short Season-A baseball, beginning in the New York–Penn League. His 1990 Spokane Indians, a San Diego Padres affiliate, won the Northwest League championship.

Bob Gebhard, the scout who signed Glynn for the Expos in 1979, was the first general manager in the history of the Colorado Rockies, and he brought Glynn into the expansion team's system in 1992, managing in the Northwest League at Bend, Oregon. They won the south division title and Glynn moved up to minor league field coordinator the following year. By 1994, Glynn was on the coaching staff of the major league Rockies in Denver, serving for five full seasons, through 1998. He then returned to the Expos for one season (1999) as an MLB coach, then spent longer tenures as the third-base coach of the Chicago Cubs (2000–02) and San Francisco Giants (2003–06).

Glynn spent the 2007–11 seasons as a member of the professional scouting staff of the Tampa Bay Rays, based in Waseca.

In 2012, Glynn joined the Twins' organization as manager of the Triple-A Rochester Red Wings. After a 72–72 season, the Red Wings' best record in four years, Glynn returned to Rochester in 2013 and 2014, and led his club to identical 77–67 marks.

As a result of his success, Glynn was interviewed for the parent Twins' vacant managerial opening in October 2014, after the firing of veteran skipper Ron Gardenhire. Hall of famer Paul Molitor ultimately was hired as the Twins' 2015 pilot, and he added Glynn to his first-year staff as third-base coach.

In 2019, he joined the Marlins as infield and baserunning coordinator.

Glynn retired from baseball after the 2020 season. On May 4, 2021, Glynn was announced as the head boys basketball coach at St. Clair High School in St. Clair, Minnesota. He coached the team during the 2021-2022 season and announced he would be stepping down as head coach at the end of the season.

Preceded by Jerry Royster	Colorado Rockies first base coach 1994	Succeeded by Art Howe
Preceded by Don Zimmer	Colorado Rockies third base coach 1995–1998	Succeeded by Rich Donnelly
Preceded by Jim Tracy	Montreal Expos bench coach 1999	Succeeded by Luis Pujols
Preceded by Tom Gamboa	Chicago Cubs third base coach 2000–2002	Succeeded by Dave Bialas
Preceded by Sonny Jackson	San Francisco Giants third base coach 2003–2006	Succeeded by Tim Flannery
Preceded by Tom Nieto	Rochester Red Wings manager 2012–2014	Succeeded by Mike Quade
Preceded by Paul Molitor	Minnesota Twins third base coach 2015–2018	Succeeded by Tony Diaz
