= Coos Bay-North Bend A's =

Coos Bay–North Bend A's
- 1970–1972; North Bend, Oregon

Minor league affiliations
- Class: Class A-Short Season (1970–1972)
- League: Northwest League (1970–1972)
- Division: South

Major league affiliations
- Team: Oakland Athletics (1970–1972)

Minor league titles
- League titles: None
- Division titles (1): 1970

Team data
- Colors: Kelly green, athletic gold, white
- Ballpark: North Bend Municipal Park (1970–1972)
- Owner(s)/ Operator(s): Oregon Coast Baseball, Inc.
- General manager: Curly Leininger

The Coos Bay–North Bend A's were a minor league baseball team that represented Coos Bay, Oregon and North Bend, Oregon. From 1970 to 1972, the Coos Bay–North Bend A's played as members of the Class A Short Season level Northwest League. The Coos Bay–North Bend A's were an affiliate of the Oakland Athletics and hosted home games at the North Bend Municipal Park.

== History ==
Minor league baseball first came to the area when the Coos Bay–North Bend A's joined the Northwest League in 1970. The Northwest league expanded from a four–team league in 1969 to a six–team league in 1970 with the addition of Coos Bay–North Bend and the Bend Rainbows.

The Oakland A's had a Northwest League farm team in Pasco, Washington where they played the 1969 season as the Tri-City A's. Davego Sports Inc., who owned the Tri-City franchise, declined to renew their working agreement with Oakland. Tri-City would sign on with the San Diego Padres. Oakland A's farm system director Phil Seghi wanted to keep a team in the Northwest League. Seghi and the league president narrowed down a list of possible destinations: Vancouver, British Columbia, Kalispell, Montana, Missoula, Montana and North Bend, Oregon. The Northwest League president, John Carbray, negotiated with Seghi to place a franchise in North Bend-Coos Bay and gained the support of local leaders. As an affiliate of the Athletics, the club adopted the A's moniker. North Bend Municipal Park was expanded and upgraded to host the team. The A's games were broadcast locally on KBBR radio. The price of a 1970 single-season ticket was $25 for the whole season. On opening night June 24, 1970, 813 were in attendance for the first game.

The 1970 Coos Bay–North Bend A's finished with a 45–35 record, ahead of the Bend Rainbows (39–41), Lewis-Clark Broncs (43–37), Medford Dodgers (36–44), Tri-City Padres (38–42) and Walla Walla Phillies (39–41) in the Northwest League standings. Managed by Harry Bright, the A's finished 1st in the South Division. Playing at North Bend Municipal Park, the Coos Bay–North Bend A's had a season attendance of 14,817, an average of 370 per game.

In their second season, the 1971 Coos Bay–North Bend A's placed 2nd in the Northwest League South Division and 5th overall. The Coos Bay–North Bend A's finished the regular season with a record of 36–42, playing the season under managers Jim Reinhold and Warren Hacker. The A's had a home attendance of 11,701 for the season.

In their final season, the 1972 Coos Bay–North Bend A's finished 3rd in the Northwest League South Division and 5th overall. Managed by Grover Resinger, the A's finished 33–45. In their final season at North Bend Municipal Park, the Coos Bay–North Bend A's' season attendance was 10,220 an average of 262, last in the Northwest League.

On August 21, 1972, the team scheduled a ceremonial Charlie O’ Finley day in honor of the Oakland A's and franchise owner. Finley didn't appear as planned. On August 30, the last home game of the season, there were 291 fans in attendance.

Following the season, Oregon Coast Baseball terminated its affiliation with the Oakland Athletics. The Oakland Athletics moved their Northwest League farm team to Lewiston, Idaho, where they played the 1973 Northwest League season as the Lewiston Broncos.

"The Bay Area was blessed," said Ed Keim, President of Oregon Coast Baseball, the Coos Bay–North Bend A's local sponsor group. "Even though it was a short amount of time, the people who were able to brave the weather got to see some great ballplayers who did some incredible things after the time they spent here."

North Bend and Coos Bay have not hosted another minor league team.

== The ballpark ==
The Coos Bay–North Bend A's were noted to have played home games at North Bend Municipal Park. Built in 1947, the ballpark had a capacity of 1,000 and field dimensions of (Left, Center, Right) 325–390–305 (1971). Today, the ballpark is known as "Clyde Allen Field" and is still in use by youth baseball teams and North Bend High School teams. The Clyde Allen Field address is 2222 Broadway Avenue, North Bend, Oregon.

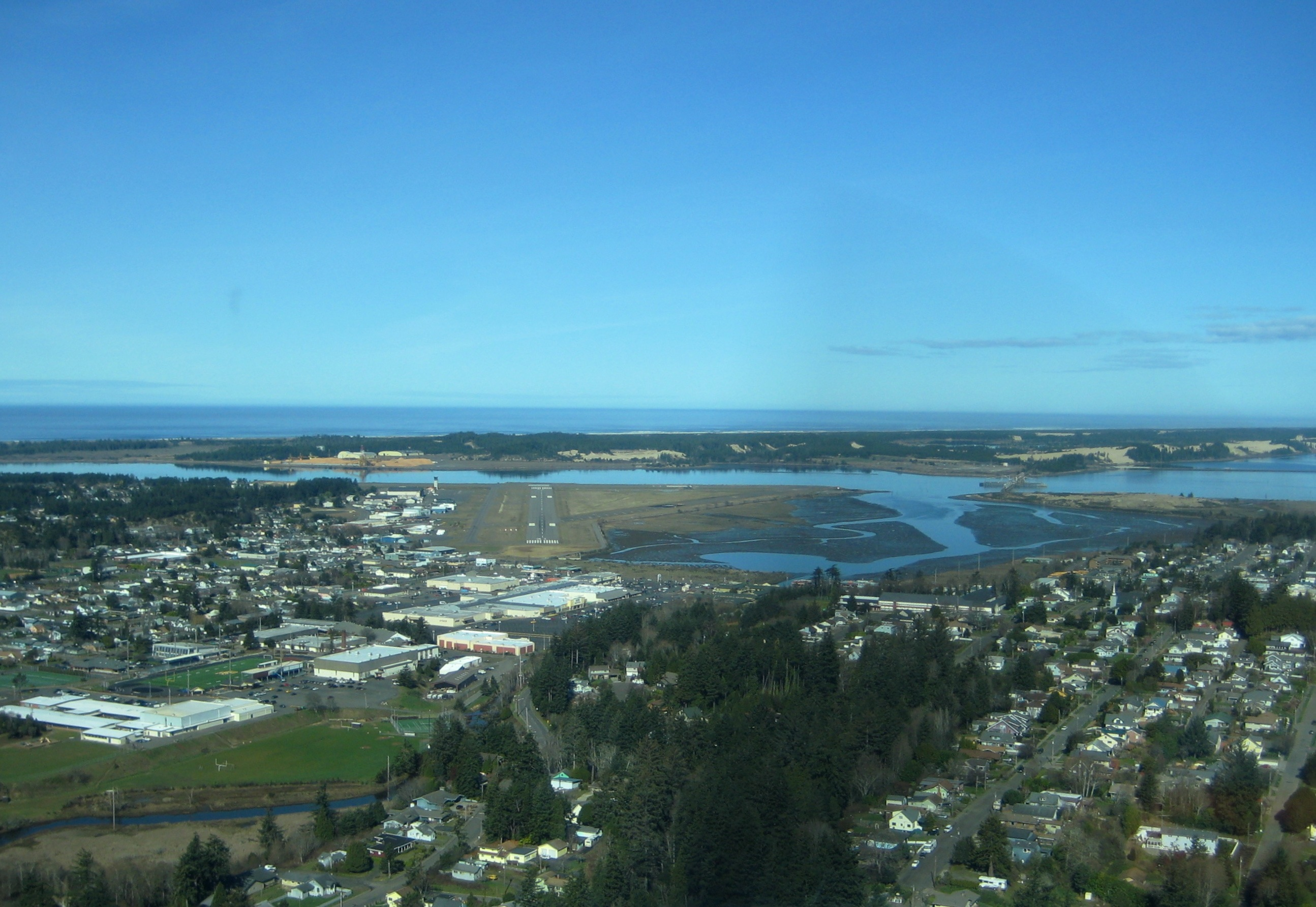
(2009) Aerial. North Bend, Oregon

== Season-by-season record ==
| Season | PDC | Division | Finish | Wins | Losses | Win% | Postseason | Manager | Attendance |
|---|---|---|---|---|---|---|---|---|---|
Coos Bay–North Bend A's
| 1970 | OAK | South | 1st | 45 | 35 | .562 | NWL runner-up by virtue of record | Harry Bright | 14,817 |
| 1971 | OAK | South | 2nd | 36 | 42 | .462 | | Jim Reinhold | 11,701 |
| 1972 | OAK | South | 3rd | 33 | 45 | .423 | | Grover Resinger | 10,220 |

| Division winner | League champions |

== Notable alumni ==
- Glenn Abbott (1970)
- Mike Barlow (1970)
- Chris Batton (1972)
- Harry Bright (1970, MGR)
- Charlie Chant (1970)
- Warren Hacker (1971, MGR)
- Vic Harris (1970)
- Leon Hooten (1971)
- Bob Lacey (1972)
- Steve Lawson (1970)
- Chet Lemon (1972)3x MLB All-Star
- Grover Resinger (1972, MGR)
- Champ Summers (1971)
- Claudell Washington (1972) 2x MLB All-Star
- Ron Williamson (1972)

== See also ==
- Coos Bay-North Bend A's players
