= Mount Rainier Professional Baseball League =

- Sport: Baseball
- Founded: 2014
- Folded: 2015
- Commissioner: Mike Greene
- No. of teams: 6
- Country: United States
- Website: www.MRPBL.com

The Mount Rainier Professional Baseball League was an independent, professional baseball league located in the Pacific Northwest region of the United States. Operating in cities not served by Major League Baseball or their minor-league affiliates, the MRPBL had six franchise teams spread throughout the states of Washington, Oregon, and Montana.

Founded in 2014, the league was divided into an Eastern and Western Division, with each team playing a 68-game regular-season schedule lasting from May through August.

Play ceased early on in the inaugural, 2015 season because the league was experiencing substantial financial difficulty. Owner and commissioner Mike Greene admitted that he was unprepared for the challenges of running the league. According to a press release, the league required an average of 300 fans per game in order to remain solvent. The league had trouble finding host families for players. Some teams' uniforms were not ready by the start of the season and they resorted to wearing other team's uniforms. Greene offered to grant free franchise rights to any potential owners and estimated that it would require an investment of approximately $70,000 in order to get a new team off the ground.

On June 1, 2015, the league issued a press release announcing that it would contract from six to four teams. Players from the remaining teams would be granted release from their contracts upon request and players on eliminated teams would be reassigned to the remaining teams, which would potentially require expanding the roster sizes. However, in the same press release, the league announced that the remaining teams' rosters would feature 24 players as opposed to the 25-man rosters the league had previously employed.

The teams folded soon afterwards as the league fell apart amid reports of players not being paid and teams not having gas money to travel to games. Only eight games were played during the abbreviated season.

== Franchises ==
MRPBL
Division	Team	City	Stadium
East	Ellensburg Bulls	Ellensburg, Washington	Rotary Park
East	Glacier Outlaws	Whitefish, Montana	Memorial Park
East	Moses Lake Rattlesnakes	Moses Lake, Washington	Larson Field
Division	Team	City	Stadium
West	Skagit Valley Lumberjacks	Mount Vernon, Washington	Dream Field
West	Oregon City Mud Turtles	Oregon City, Oregon	Clackamas Park
West	Grays Harbor Gulls	Hoquiam, Washington	Olympic Stadium
