= Bend Bandits =

Minor league baseball team from Bend, OR

The Bend Bandits were a minor league baseball team located in Bend, Oregon. The team played in the independent Western Baseball League, and was not affiliated with any Major League Baseball team. Their home stadium was Vince Genna Stadium.

The Bandits were founded in 1995 and ceased operations in 2000, though their last season was in 1998. Their mascot was Rowdy the Rebel Raccoon.
