= Don Long =

American professional baseball coach (born 1962)

- Hitting coach
- Born: March 17, 1962 (age 64); Bremerton, Washington
- Bats: Switch Throws: Right
- Stats at Baseball Reference

Teams
- Pittsburgh Pirates (2008–2010); Cincinnati Reds (2014–2018); Baltimore Orioles (2019–2021)

Donald Thomas Long (born March 17, 1962) is an American professional baseball coach. Long has spent 11 seasons as a Major League Baseball (MLB) hitting coach, serving in the role for the Pittsburgh Pirates (2008–2010), Cincinnati Reds (2014–2018), and Baltimore Orioles (2019-2021).

== Career ==
A former switch-hitting infielder, Long was originally selected by the San Francisco Giants in the third round of the 1983 MLB draft. He played three years in the Giants farm system (1983–85) where he compiled a .251 batting average, 12 home runs and 76 RBI in 198 games. Before becoming a manager in the minor leagues, Long served as the head coach at Seattle University in 1986. Long is a 1980 graduate of Meadowdale High School in Lynnwood, Washington. He attended Washington State University and earned All-Pac-10 honors as a shortstop in 1983.

Long spent 12 years as a manager in the California/Anaheim Angels minor league system before joining Philadelphia. He made his managerial debut with the Quad Cities River Bandits in the Midwest League in 1987 before spending two seasons with the Bend Bucks. Don returned to Quad City and was named Midwest League Manager-of-the-Year after leading his squad to the 1990 league title. A year later he captured Manager-of-the-Year accolades again after guiding the Midland Angels to a 37–30 second-half record and into the Texas League playoffs. After two more seasons with Midland (1992–93), Long managed in the Pacific Coast League for three years, leading the Vancouver Canadians to a pair of first-place finishes. He advanced to the league championship in 1994 and was named the league's Manager-of-the-Year in 1995 after guiding the club to an 81-60 regular-season record and an appearance in the post season. In his 12 seasons as a minor league skipper, Long produced a 745–788 record. Long worked eight years as the minor league hitting coordinator with the Philadelphia Phillies. He spent the 1999 season as the Phillies roving hitting instructor.

On January 14, 2019, Long was hired by the Baltimore Orioles to be the team's new hitting coach on Brandon Hyde's staff, replacing Scott Coolbaugh. After two years as the hitting coach for Baltimore, on October 4, 2021, the team announced that Long would not be returning for the 2022 season.
