= P. J. Carey =

P.J. Carey
- Born: November 4, 1953; Scranton, Pennsylvania, U.S.
- Died: December 7, 2012 (aged 59); San Diego, California, U.S.
- Batted: Right Threw: Right

MiLB Manager statistics
- Games: 2002
- Win–loss record: 971–1030
- Winning %: .485

Teams
- As MLB coach: Colorado Rockies (1997)

Career highlights and awards
- Arizona League champions (1998)

Paul Jerome "P. J." Carey (November 4, 1953 – December 7, 2012) was an American professional baseball player, manager, instructor, and farm system official.

In 2011, Carey served as senior advisor, player development, of the Los Angeles Dodgers of Major League Baseball. Carey was a minor league catcher, coach and manager, and a Major League coach and player development official, during his 40-year baseball career, which began in 1972.

Carey was born in Scranton, Pennsylvania. He graduated from Scranton Preparatory School in 1971 and attended the University of Scranton before signing his first professional contract with the Philadelphia Phillies in 1972. A catcher who threw and batted right-handed, he stood 6 feet 1 inch (1.85 m) tall and weighed 185 pounds (84 kg). His four-year playing career was spent at the Rookie, Short Season-A and Class A levels of the Philadelphia organization, where he batted .215 in 143 total games. From 1976 through 1979, Carey coached on Phillies' farm teams before launching his managerial career in 1980 with the Bend Phillies of the Short Season-A Northwest League.

His minor league managing career extended for 22 seasons — largely at the Rookie or Short Season-A levels — between 1980 and 2006 and included stints with the Phillies, Seattle Mariners, Cincinnati Reds, and Colorado Rockies. He served as a coach on the Rockies' Major League staff in 1997. After 13 years with the Rockies, Carey joined the Dodgers in 2007 as minor league field coordinator, and held his position as senior player development advisor from 2009.
