= Bend Elks =

Information
- League: West Coast League (South)
- Location: Bend, Oregon
- Ballpark: Vince Genna Stadium
- Founded: 1999
- League championships: 2 (2004, 2015)
- Division championships: 2 (2010, 2015)
- Colors: Black, gold
- Mascot: Vinnie the Elk
- Ownership: John and Tami Marick
- Manager: Allen Cox

The Bend Elks are a collegiate men's summer baseball team located in Bend, Oregon. The Elks compete in the West Coast League and play their home games at Vince Genna Stadium.

Founded as an expansion team in the Pacific International League, the Elks won the PIL Championship in 2004. Following their championship season, the Elks left the PIL to become a founding member of the West Coast League. After some early struggles, the Elks have won two division titles and a league championship in 2015.

Following their lone WCL Championship win, the Elks did not make the playoffs again until 2024.

== History ==
Jim and Mary Ann Richards founded the Bend Elks Baseball Club in 1999 with the hope of saving Vince Genna Stadium from demolition. The Elks joined the Pacific International League. Bend continued their affiliation with the league through 2004. In 2005 the Elks along with Bellingham, Kelowna, Spokane, and Wenatchee left the league to form the West Coast Collegiate Baseball League (WCCBL).

The Bend Elks went 31-23 in the 2014 WCL season finishing 4 games behind the leading Corvallis Knights and were awarded the first ever WCL wild card spot. Bend was eliminated after the WCL Divisional Series to the rival Corvallis Knights in 2 games. The Elks were Hit by the pitch 72 times and set a WCL record for the most times hit at the plate in one season. The front office of the Bend Elks put 42,030 people through the turnstiles in 31 games at home with 1,356 per game.

In October 2014, John and Tami Marick purchased the Bend Elks Baseball Club from Jim and Mary Ann Richards. The Maricks are founders of Consumer Cellular, a nationwide wireless MVNO based in Tigard, Oregon, with one of its three corporate locations in Central Oregon.

In 2015 the Bend Elks won the WCL championship series.

The Elks are the latest in a long history of semi-pro and minor-league teams to call Central Oregon home.

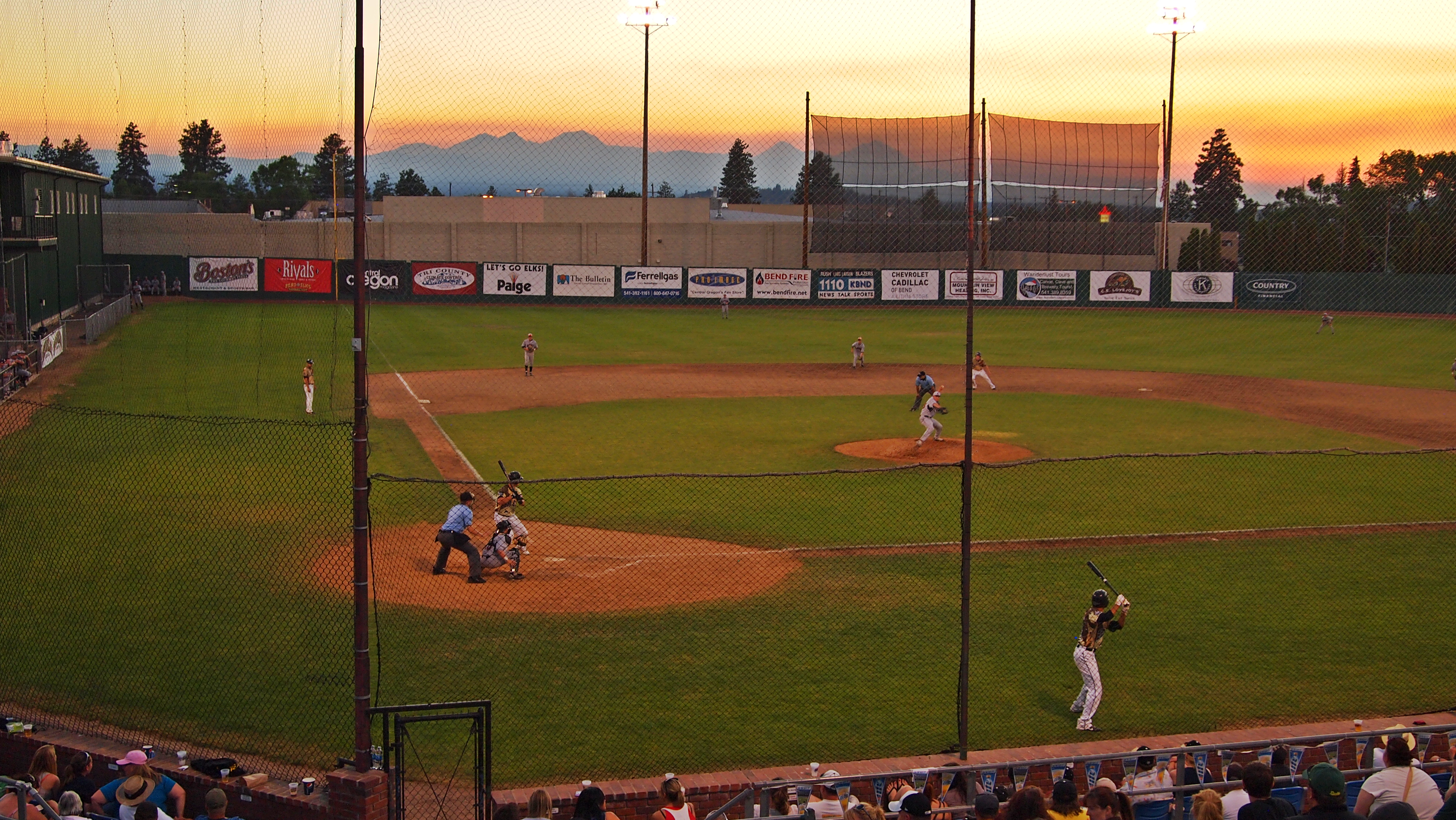

=== 2024 ===
Jackson Elder (Utah) was named pitcher of the week on July 9. Elder threw for seven innings in the Elks' game against the Pippins allowing zero runs and only three hits while also throwing eight strikeouts.

Also on July 9, Easton Amundson, Mason Edwards, Jackson Elder, and Tyler Wood were selected to represent the Elks in the 2024 all star game in Bellingham.

The Elks made the postseason as a wildcard. This was the Elks' first playoff berth since 2015. The Elks were swept by the Pickles in the Divisional Series 0-2.

=== 2025 ===
On July 8, it was announced that Easton Amundson (MSU Denver), Erik Puodziunas (Michigan) and John-Paul Sauer (Tulane) were selected to represent the Elks at the All Star Game in Bellingham.

Jace Miller (Portland) was named player of the week on July 14.

The Elks failed to improve on their 32-22 record from the previous season. The Elks went 28-26 and finished third in the South Division. Miller lead the league with a .383 batting average and also finished with forty runs batted in. Makoa Sniffen (Saint Mary's, California) was third in the league with forty-six runs batted in and also hit seven home runs. Kyler Bacosa (Uncommitted) finished tied for second in the league with five pitching wins while Carson Boyer (Gonzaga) finished tied for third in the league with four. Puodziunas finished with a 3.60 ERA. 36,700 total fans attended the Elks' twenty-seven home games for an average of 1,359 fans per game.

The Elks clinched a wildcard berth for their second straight playoff appearance. The Elks faced the Knights in the South Divisional Series. The Elks took game one 7-5 for their first playoff win since the 2015 WCL Championship Series but proceeded to lose the next two games in Corvallis to end their season.

=== 2026 ===
Former Elk Mason Edwards participated in the 2026 MLB Draft Combine.

== Notable alumni ==
Elks alumni who went on to play in Major League Baseball include Brian Barden, Jacoby Ellsbury, Blaine Hardy, Trevor Hildenberger, and Eric Sogard.

== Results by Season ==
League Champions	Division Champions	Playoff Team

Year	League	Division	Finish	Wins	Losses	Win%	GB	Postseason	Manager
2000	Pacific International League			17	13			Did Not Qualify	Donny Harrel
2001	PIL			21	9			Did Not Qualify	Donny Harrel
2002	PIL			17	13			Did Not Qualify	Donny Harrel
2003	PIL			15	15			Did Not Qualify	Casey Powell
2004	PIL			24	12			PIL Champions	Zeke Mitchem
2005	West Coast League			13	23			Did Not Qualify	Rob Strickland
2006	WCL			24	18			Did Not Qualify	Nathan Pratt
2007	WCL			23	19			Did Not Qualify	Casey Powell
2008	WCL			23	19			Lost Division Series	Ryan Thompson
2009	WCL			25	23			Lost Division Series (Corvallis)	Scott Anderson
2010	WCL	South	2nd	27	21	.563	4	Won Division Series 2-0 (Corvalliss); Lost Championship Series 1-2 (Wenatchee)	Sean Kinney
2011	WCL	West	2nd	29	25	.537	8	Lost Division Series 1-2 (Corvallis)	Sean Kinney
2012	WCL	South	4th	24	30	.444	8	Did Not Qualify	Sean Kinney
2013	WCL	South	3rd	30	24	.556	7	Did Not Qualify	Joe Dominiak
2014	WCL	South	2nd	31	23	.574	4	Lost Division Series 0-2 (Corvallis)	Marty Hunter
2015	WCL	South	1st	35	16	.686	-	Won Division Series 2-0 (Corvallis); Won Championship Series 2-0 (Kelowna)	Trey Watt
2016	WCL	South	5th	21	33	.389	13	Did Not Qualify	Casey Powell
2017	WCL	South	4th	26	28	.481	8	Did Not Qualify	Alan Embree
2018	WCL	South	5th	12	42	.222	25	Did Not Qualify	Alan Embree
2019	WCL	South	6th	21	33	.389	21	Did Not Qualify	Joe Dominiak
2020	Season cancelled (COVID-19)								
2021	WCL	South	4th	26	22	.542	11	Did Not Qualify	Kyle Nobach
2022	WCL	South	5th	28	26	.519	11	Did Not Qualify	Joey Wong
2023	WCL	South	5th	25	29	.463	14	Did Not Qualify	Joey Wong
2024	WCL	South	3rd	32	21	.604	8.5	Lost South Divisional Series 0-2 (Portland)	Allen Cox
2025	WCL	South	3rd	28	26	.519	15	Lost South Divisional Series 1-2 (Corvallis)	Allen Cox
2026	WCL	South	8th	19	34	.358	11.5	Did Not Qualify	Allen Cox
