= Mel Roberts =

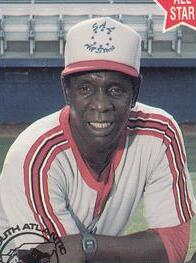
- Roberts c. 1988
- Coach
- Born: January 18, 1943; Abington Township, Montgomery County, Pennsylvania, U.S.
- Died: September 1, 2007 (aged 64); Danville, Virginia, U.S.
- Batted: Right Threw: Right
- Stats at Baseball Reference

Teams
- Philadelphia Phillies (1992–1995)

Melvin Henry Roberts (January 18, 1943 – September 1, 2007) was an American professional baseball player, coach and manager. Primarily an outfielder during his playing days, all spent in the minor leagues, Roberts spent four seasons (1992–95) in Major League Baseball as the first-base coach of the Philadelphia Phillies, including service on the Phillies' 1993 National League pennant-winning team.

Roberts was born in Abington Township, Montgomery County, Pennsylvania, graduated from Abington Senior High School, and attended both Temple University and Spartanburg Technical College. A right-handed batter and thrower who stood 6 feet (1.8 m) tall and weighed 180 pounds (82 kg), he signed with the Los Angeles Dodgers in 1961 and played in their farm system for four seasons. After spending 1965 out of pro baseball, Roberts signed with the Phillies' system, playing for the 1966 Spartanburg Phillies as a teammate of Larry Bowa and Denny Doyle on a club that won a Western Carolinas League record 25 consecutive games and the league championship. With lengthy service as a player, coach and manager, Roberts became a longtime resident of Spartanburg, South Carolina. In 781 games played, Roberts batted .234 with 588 hits during a ten-season minor league playing career.

After 1970, Roberts' last full-time season as a player, he became a coach in the Philadelphia organization with the Peninsula Phillies (1971), Reading Phillies (1972; 1977), Spartanburg (1973–76; 1978–83; 1985–86), and Bend Phillies (1985). He was the Phillies' roving minor league outfield instructor for one season (1984). He then became a manager at Bend (1987) and Spartanburg (1988–91) before joining the Major League coaching staff of Phillies' manager Jim Fregosi in 1992.

Upon leaving the Phils in 1996 after a 30-year career with the organization, Roberts joined the Atlanta Braves as a minor league coach and spent his final 12 seasons in baseball with the Braves. In 2007, his final campaign, Roberts was a coach with the Rookie-level Danville Braves of the Appalachian League when he died unexpectedly just as the season was concluding, in Danville, Virginia, at age 64, leaving a wife and four children.

Preceded by John Vukovich	Philadelphia Phillies first base coach 1992–1995	Succeeded by Dave Cash
