= Olympic Stadium (Hoquiam) =

City of Hoquiam - Olympic Stadium
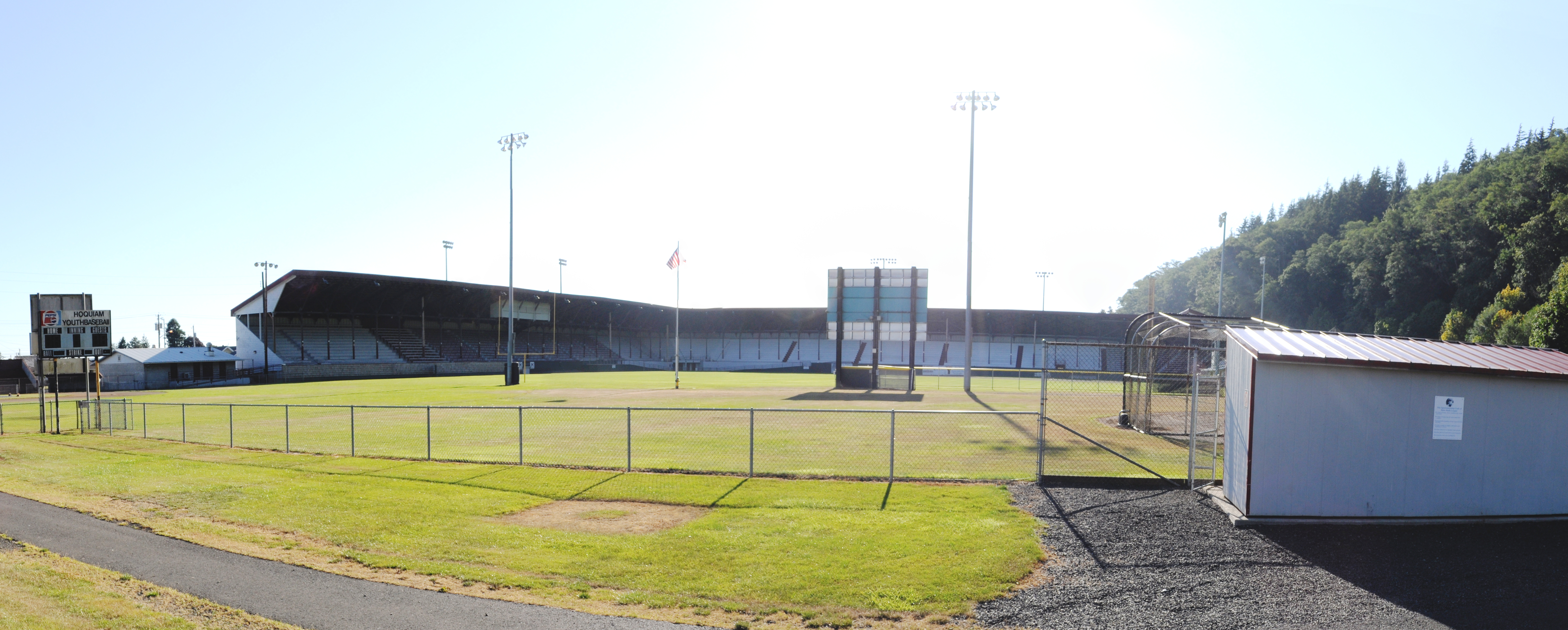
- Interactive map of City of Hoquiam - Olympic Stadium
- Location: 101 28th Street; Hoquiam, Washington 98550-2901
- Coordinates: 46°58′41″N 123°51′32″W
- Owner: City of Hoquiam
- Capacity: 9,000
- Surface: Grass

Construction
- Opened: 1937
- Renovated: 2006
- Architect: Works Progress Administration
- Main contractor: Works Progress Administration

Tenants
- Baseball; Grays Harbor Ports (1976); Grays Harbor Loggers (1977–1978; 1980–1981); Grays Harbor Mets (1979); Grays Harbor Gulls (1995–1997); Grays Harbor Rain (1999) Football; Hoquiam High School Grizzlies

- Olympic Stadium
- U.S. National Register of Historic Places
- Location: Hoquiam, Washington
- Built: 1937
- Architect: Works Progress Administration
- NRHP reference No.: 06000731
- Added to NRHP: 2006

Olympic Stadium is a stadium in Hoquiam, Washington which opened in 1938. The City of Hoquiam first got the idea for an all-wood stadium in the early 1930s when it applied for a Civil Works Administration grant. In 1932, the grant was approved. Construction began in early 1938, with the stadium officially opening to the public on November 24, 1938. A renovation grant was awarded through the "Save America's Treasures" program requested by Congressional Representative Norm Dicks in 2005. Dicks also backed the State Historic Preservation Office request to add the stadium to the National Register of Historic Places which was granted in 2006.

The physical structure of Olympic Stadium is an old-growth fir heavy-timber frame with cedar shingles siding. Built in a truncated U-shape with angled corners, the open portion of the 2 1/2-story grandstand faces east. This orientation was used so that fans and players would be somewhat sheltered from the wind and rain coming off the Pacific Ocean.

The all-wooden park appears to be one of the more unusual in the country, with the shingled exterior, the completely covered L-shaped grandstand extending all the way down the line in right and extending into the outfield. The seats are wooden grandstands, which overlook the fields which are in excellent shape.

In 2015 the Grays Harbor Gulls of the newly minted Mount Rainier Professional Baseball League opened for business. Prior to that the stadium last hosted professional baseball in the late 1990s when the Grays Harbor Gulls of the independent Western Baseball League called this park home and is now the home of the Grays Harbor Bearcats, a semi-pro football team. With an overflow capacity of 10,000, the stadium hosts baseball and football fields and receives plenty of use from teams such as the Bearcats football team, Hoquiam High School football team, Hoquiam Youth Baseball and Youth Football, the Comcast Outdoor Cinema, the Push Rods event, the Bluegrass festival and Logger's Playday events yearly.
