= Portland Rockies =

- 1995–2000; Portland, Oregon

Minor league affiliations
- Class: Class A Short Season (1995–2000)
- League: Northwest League (1995–2000)

Major league affiliations
- Team: Colorado Rockies (1995–2000)

Minor league titles
- League titles (1): 1997
- Division titles (2): 1997; 1999

Team data
- Name: Portland Rockies (1995–2000)
- Colors: Purple, black, silver, white
- Mascot: Rocky the Raccoon
- Ballpark: Civic Stadium (1995–2000)

The Portland Rockies were a minor league baseball team that played in Portland, Oregon. The Rockies were members of the Class A-Short Season Northwest League for six years, from 1995 through 2000. Prior to relocating to Portland, the franchise played in Bend as the Bend Rockies from 1992 through 1994.

== History ==
The Rose City was without baseball as then-owner Joe Buzas relocated the Portland Beavers of the Class AAA Pacific Coast League to Salt Lake City following the 1993 season. Calgary Cannons owner Russ Parker threatened to move his club south to Portland, but ultimately remained in Alberta. With Oregon's largest city open, the Bend Rockies opted to fill the void by relocating from Central Oregon. The Bend Rockies were the parent club's first minor league team, continued their affiliation in the move to Portland.

The Rockies had success in Portland, including a league championship in 1997. Although few Class A teams play in cities as large as Portland, the Rockies were able to maintain local interest in baseball. The team served an important role for the city, whose demand for a major league team was growing.

With the community's support for the Portland Rockies, Civic Stadium was renovated in 2000 to regain Triple-A baseball. Their efforts proved to be successful as the Albuquerque Dukes moved from New Mexico to Portland and became a new incarnation of the Triple-A Beavers for the 2001 PCL season. The displaced Northwest League franchise relocated up the Columbia River to Pasco, Washington located in the Tri-Cities area. The team was renamed the Tri-City Dust Devils.

== Identity ==
Their name and logo mimicked the mountain theme of the Colorado club, even though Portland is not located in the Rocky Mountains. A rose was added to the team's cap logo to signify Portland's nickname, the "Rose City."

== Ballpark ==
The Rockies played at Civic Stadium (now known as Providence Park) located in Portland. In 2000, PGE Park was renovated and a new incarnation of the AAA Beavers moved into the stadium in 2001. With the departure of professional baseball the stadium was converted into a soccer only venue in 2011 as part of a $31 million reinvention and is now the home of the Portland Timbers.

== Season-by-season record ==
Season	PDC	Division	Finish	Wins	Losses	Win%	Postseason	Manager	Attendance
Portland Rockies
1995	COL	South	2nd	41	34	.547		P. J. Carey	249,696
1996	COL	South	3rd	33	43	.434		Ron Gideon	249,995
1997	COL	South	1st	44	32	.579	Defeated Boise in championship series 3-2	Jim Eppard	213,242
1998	COL	South	3rd	34	42	.447		Jim Eppard	184,172
1999	COL	South	1st	39	37	.513	Lost to Spokane in championship series 3-0	Alan Cockrell	206,136
2000	COL	South	4th	32	44	.421		Billy White	161,446

Division winner	League champions

== Former players ==
Notable former Portland Rockies include MLB players Chone Figgins, Juan Pierre, Clint Barmes, Brad Hawpe, Jake Westbrook, and Garrett Atkins.

Portland Rockies players (1995–2000)

Preceded by Bend Rockies	Northwest League franchise 1995–2000	Succeeded by Tri-City Dust Devils
