= Bend Timber Hawks =

- (1978); Bend, Oregon

Minor league affiliations
- Class: Class A Short Season
- League: Northwest League
- Division: South

Major league affiliations
- Previous teams: Oakland Athletics

Team data
- Colors: Kelly green, athletic gold, white
- Owner/ Operator: Doug Emmans

The Bend Timberhawks were a minor league baseball team located in Bend, Oregon. The Timber Hawks were members of the Class A-Short Season Northwest League for a single season in 1978 and were affiliated with the Oakland Athletics.

== History ==
Professional baseball would be returning to Bend in 1978 with the expansion of the Northwest League. The central Oregon city had hosted the Bend Rainbows for two season from 1970-1971 until the club relocated to Seattle. The franchise had initially been awarded to Dean Taylor, but Taylor sold the club to Doug Emmans prior to the start of the season.

The franchise signed a player development contract with the Oakland Athletics. The Timber Hawks finished the season with a middling record of 35-37 to finish second in the south division standings. Bend struggled financially as attendance was well below expectations. Owner Doug Emmans was disappointed with community's reception. The club received little support from local businesses and projects for the upcoming season were not positive. Emmans commented on his Timber Hawks' situation; "I want this team to be in a place were people want it. I don't want it to be a bastard child like it was last year." Likewise, the Oakland A's had their doubts about returning to Bend. Emmans engaged in discussions with Medford, Oregon as a potential relocation destination. In February 1979, Jackson County commissioners approved the use of Miles Field for professional baseball. With a stadium deal in place, the franchise was on the move to southern Oregon. Upon moving to Medford, the Timber Hawks moniker in favor of one representative of their parent club Oakland to become the Medford A's.

Despite the departure of the Emman's franchise, Bend area residents expressed a desire for baseball to return. The Northwest League quickly awarded a new franchise to Bend. In signing a player development contract with the Philadelphia Phillies, the Central Oregon Phillies were founded and began play in 1979.

== Ballpark ==
The Timber Hawks played at Vince Genna Stadium located in Bend, Oregon.

== Season-by-season record ==
Season	PDC	Division	Finish	Wins	Losses	Win%	Postseason	Manager	Attendance
Bend Timber Hawks
1978	OAK	South	2nd	35	37	.486		Ed Nottle	14,420

== See also ==
- Bend Timber Hawks players

Preceded by Expansion franchise	Northwest League franchise 1978	Succeeded by Medford A's
