= Wenatchee Chiefs =

- 1937–1965; Wenatchee, Washington

Minor league affiliations
- Class: A (1963–1965); B (1955–1962); A (1952–1954); B (1946–1951); B (1937–1941)
- League: Northwest League (1955–1965); Western International League (1937–1941, 1946–1954)

Major league affiliations
- Team: Chicago Cubs (1961–1965); Cincinnati Redlegs (1957–1958); New York Yankees (1938–1940)

Minor league titles
- League titles (4): 1939; 1946; 1957; 1962

Team data
- Name: Wenatchee Chiefs (1937–1941, 1946–1965)
- Ballpark: Recreation Park (1937–1965)

The Wenatchee Chiefs were a minor league baseball team in the northwest United States, based in Wenatchee, Washington.

Founded in 1937, the team was a part of the Class B Western International League through 1954, although the team did not operate after 1941 and the entire league was suspended during World War II, for the seasons from 1943 to 1945. The Chiefs were one of the seven founding members of the Northwest League in 1955, where they remained until the team suspended operations after the 1965 season, the last before the NWL went to the short-season format.

== History ==
The Chiefs were founded in 1937 by Canadians Gerald McClay and Art Nevison, and played in the Class B Western International League (WIL). Nevison and McClay signed the first players, Bob Thrapp as an outfielder and Sky Soden as a pitcher, on March 10. They partnered with The Wenatchee Daily World to hold a contest to decide the name of the team. From entries of that contest, "Wenatchee Chiefs" was selected by a committee on April 7. Their first game was scheduled for April 20.

The team played a 144-game season, with its home field at Wenatchee's Recreation Park (47.414°N 120.321°W). In its early years, the team drew as many as 3,000 per game, with ticket prices of 5 cents for the bleachers and 40 cents for grandstand seating for adults. With baseballs costing as much as $1.50 each, the team paid children 50 cents per game to retrieve balls that went into the stands as foul balls or home runs so that they could be reused. The team was taken over by Charles C. Garland in 1938, who began an affiliation agreement with the New York Yankees, and the team won its first league pennant in 1939.

Future major league pitcher Bill Bevens threw an 8-0 no-hitter in 1939 against the Tacoma Tigers, with the only opponent reaching base on an error. The win on September 21 gave the Chiefs its first playoff win in a series in which it had lost the first three games to Tacoma. Bevens would later throw 8 2/3 innings of no-hit ball in a World Series game in 1947, known as The Cookie Game, in which Bevens and the New York Yankees lost by a score of 3–2 on a ninth inning, game-winning hit by Cookie Lavagetto.

Frank Dasso was a one-time major league pitcher for the Cincinnati Reds who finished his lengthy minor league career in Wenatchee, and took on a management role after retiring from on-field play. As general manager of the Chiefs, Dasso organized a promotion in July 1953 called "Bust Down the Fences Night" in a game against the Tri-City Braves, in which attendees at the game were told that you could "pay what you like; no regular admission." Gate receipts from the 3,200 in attendance at the game was $1,251, an average of 40 cents per fan, earning the team more in profit from that one game than any three games they had played in that season to-date.

After the 1965 season, the Northwest League lost two teams, Salem and Wenatchee, and changed to a short season format in 1966 with just four teams (Eugene Emeralds, Yakima Braves, Tri-City Atoms, and Lewiston Broncs).

== Championships ==
Wenatchee won the WIL titles in 1939 and 1946, then took its first NWL title in 1957, besting the Eugene Emeralds in seven games. The Chiefs' second and final Northwest League championship was in 1962, over Tri-City.

== Affiliations ==
The team was a minor league affiliate of the New York Yankees from 1938 to 1940, the Cincinnati Redlegs during the 1957 and 1958 seasons, and the Chicago Cubs from 1961 until 1965. The team was affiliated with the Oakland Oaks of the Pacific Coast League in 1954 and the Seattle Rainiers in 1955 and 1956.

== Players ==
The Chiefs most notable players were starting pitchers Claude Osteen (1958) and Ken Holtzman (1965). Holtzman started only eight games for Wenatchee and was called up to the Chicago Cubs in September; he became a starter for the big club in 1966. Holtzman was a starter with the Oakland A's during their three consecutive World Series titles (1972, 1973, 1974).

== Notable alumni ==
- Glenn Beckert (1963) 4 x MLB All-Star
- Ken Holtzman (1965) 2 x MLB All-Star
- Ken Hubbs (1961) 1962 NL Rookie of the Year; Died at age 22.
- Fred Norman (1965)
- Claude Osteen (1958) 3 x MLB All-Star
- Earl Torgeson (1941)
- Wenatchee Chiefs players (1937–1941, 1946–1965)
