= Charlie Silvera =

American baseball player and coach (1924–2019)

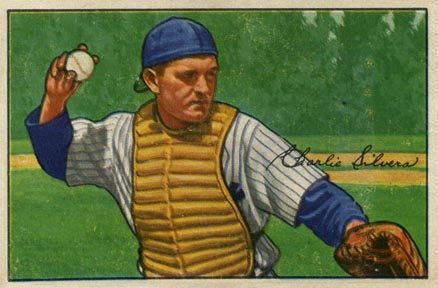
- Catcher
- Born: October 13, 1924; San Francisco, California, U.S.
- Died: September 7, 2019 (aged 94); Millbrae, California, U.S.
- Batted: Right Threw: Right

MLB debut
- September 29, 1948, for the New York Yankees

Last MLB appearance
- September 28, 1957, for the Chicago Cubs

MLB statistics
- Batting average: .282
- Home runs: 1
- Runs batted in: 52
- Stats at Baseball Reference

Teams
- New York Yankees (1948–1956); Chicago Cubs (1957)

Career highlights and awards
- 6× World Series champion (1949–1953, 1956)

Charles Anthony Ryan Silvera (October 13, 1924 – September 7, 2019) was an American Major League Baseball player and coach. Nicknamed Swede, he was part of six World Series championships with the New York Yankees.

== Early years ==
Silvera was born in San Francisco, California He signed with the Yankees in 1942, and played the outfield for the Wellsville Yankees at just seventeen years old. He missed the 1943–1945 seasons serving in World War II. When he returned for the 1946 season, he was converted to catcher with the triple A Kansas City Blues.

== New York Yankees ==
After three more seasons in the minors, Silvera debuted with the Yankees on September 29, 1948, and went three-for-four with a triple in his major league debut. He followed that up with a three-for-five performance the next day.

His hot bat earned him the backup catcher job behind Yogi Berra for the 1949 season. A thumb injury to Berra moved him into the starting job for the month of August. He batted .329 with eight runs batted in while filling in for the future Hall of Famer. For the season, he posted career highs in games played (58), at-bats (130) and RBIs (13).

The Yankees faced the Brooklyn Dodgers in the 1949 World Series. Silvera's only appearance came in game two, and he was held hitless in two at-bats by Preacher Roe. Despite having been part of six World championship teams, this was the only World Series appearance he would ever make.

== Chicago Cubs ==
Having only been used a total of 21 times in the 1955 and 1956 seasons, Silvera was dealt by the Yankees to the Chicago Cubs in exchange for fellow catcher Harry Chiti before the 1957 season. Cubs equipment manager Yosh Kawano decided to issue him Yogi Berra's number 8 upon his arrival in Chicago, as he had served as Berra's back up for eight seasons with the Yankees. His only season in the National League was interrupted by an ankle sprain in late May that caused him to miss three weeks of the season. He was released by the Cubs after just one season in which he batted .208 with two RBIs in 26 games.

== Post-playing career ==
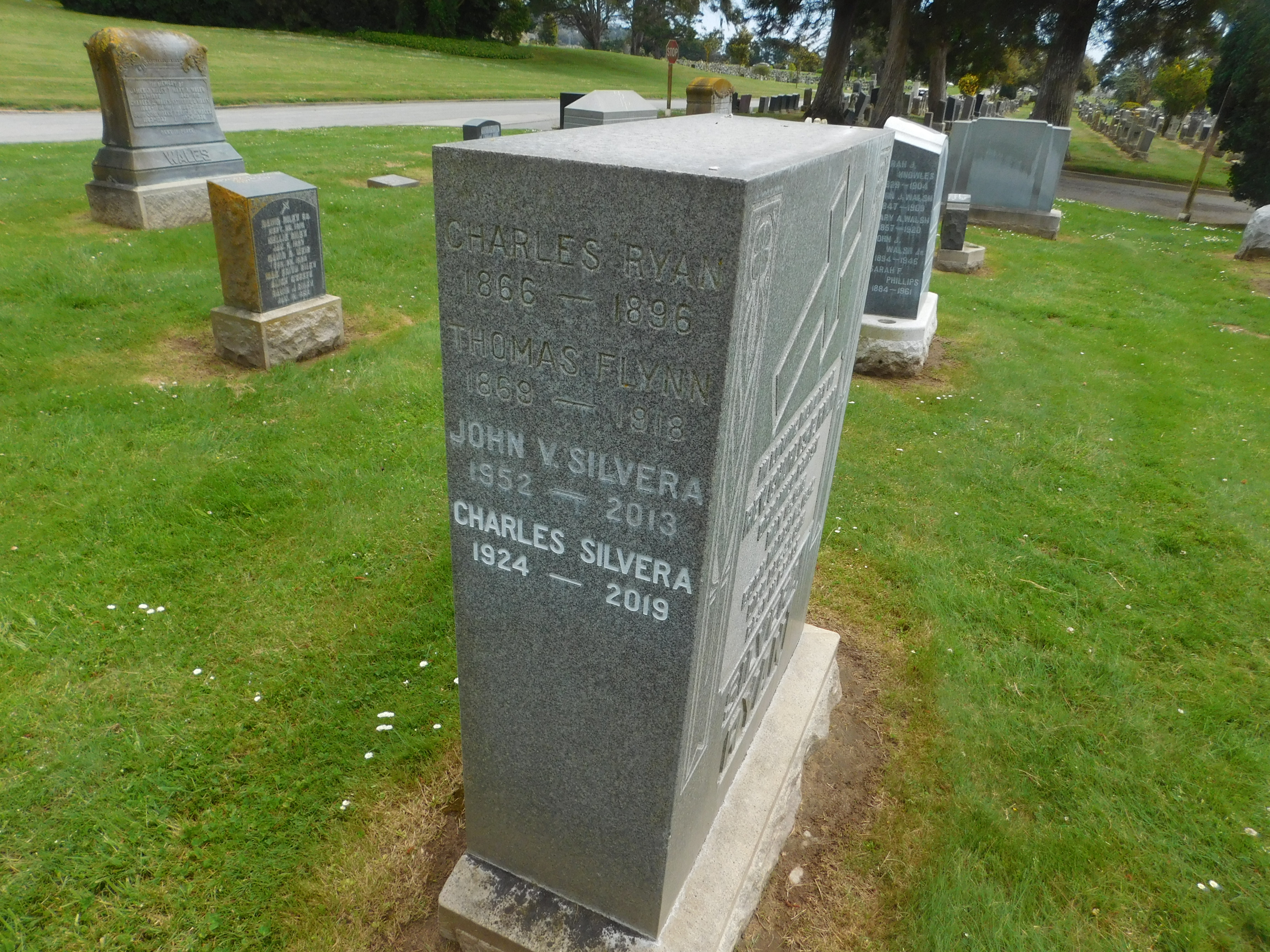
The grave of Silvera at Holy Cross Cemetery in Colma, California

Upon his release from the Cubs, Silvera returned to the Yankees as a player/manager for their Southern Association double A affiliate, the New Orleans Pelicans. With his team mired in last place, he was replaced at the helm in the middle of the 1958 season by fellow player/manager, Ray Yochim. He repeated the player manager role with the Binghamton Triplets in 1959, guiding them to a 71-68 record.

Following his playing career, Silvera scouted for the Washington Senators.

When Billy Martin got his first managing job with the Minnesota Twins in 1969 he named Silvera his bullpen coach and he rejoined Martin with the Detroit Tigers from 1971 to 1973 and the Texas Rangers in 1974 and 1975.

In later years he scouted for a number of teams, including the Cubs and the Marlins. He received his seventh World Championship ring as a scout for the Marlins in 1997.

Silvera died at age 94 on September 7, 2019. He was the last survivor among the 12 players who appeared with all five Yankee World Series-winning teams from 1949 to 1953.

Preceded by Bob Oldis	Minnesota Twins bullpen coach 1969	Succeeded by Buck Rodgers
Preceded by Len Okrie	Detroit Tigers bullpen coach 1971–1973	Succeeded by Jim Hegan
Preceded by n/a	Texas Rangers bullpen coach 1974–1975	Succeeded by Pat Corrales
