= Grays Harbor Loggers =

- 1976–1980; Hoquiam, Washington

Minor league affiliations
- Class: Short-Season A
- League: Northwest League

Major league affiliations
- Team: New York Mets (1979)

Minor league titles
- League titles (1): 1978
- Division titles (1): 1978

Team data
- Name: Grays Harbor Loggers (1980); Grays Harbor Mets (1979); Grays Harbor Loggers (1977–1978); Grays Harbor Ports (1976)
- Colors: Royal blue, white
- Ballpark: Olympic Stadium

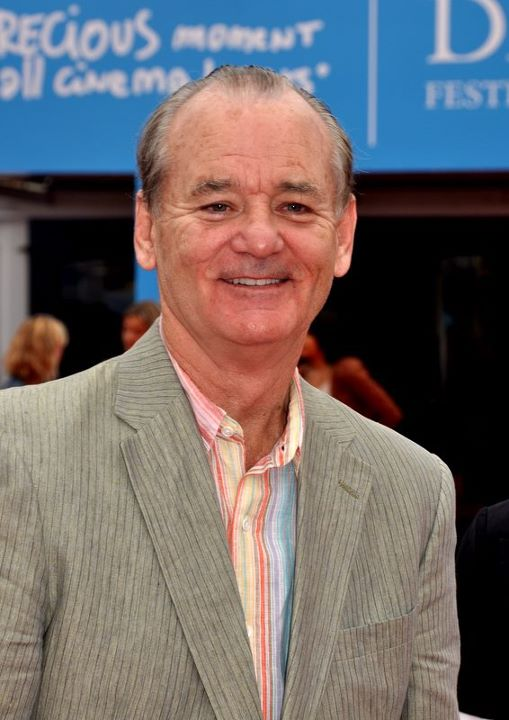
Bill Murray (2011). Murray pinch hit in 2 games for the Loggers in 1978, going 1 for 2.

The Grays Harbor Loggers was the primary name of the minor league baseball team that represented the communities of Grays Harbor, Washington, Hoquiam, Washington and Aberdeen, Washington. Grays Harbor played as members of the Class A Short Season Northwest League from 1976 to 1980.

== History ==
The Grays Harbor Ports, owned and managed by the Stockton Ports' former owner and manager Carl W. Thompson, Sr., first played in 1976. The team had a record of 26–46, which was worst in the league. Season attendance at Hoquiam's Olympic Stadium was fourth in the seven-team Northwest League at 28,842.

After Thompson sold the team in 1977, the Ports became the Grays Harbor Loggers. Two years later, the team changed their name to the Grays Harbor Mets, playing as an affiliate of the New York Mets. Their greatest season was 1978, when the team posted a 47 win and 23 loss record and won the league championship.

The championship was "a best-of-three series against the Eugene Emeralds, a Cincinnati Reds affiliate composed entirely of players 22 or younger. Grays Harbor won the series opener in Eugene. The series was scheduled to resume in Hoquiam the next night. But the field at Olympic Stadium had been soaked by rains, and the ballpark back in Eugene had been drenched, too. Northwest League President Bob Richmond had already “ruled that the series must be completed by Monday due to off-season commitments on the part of players and coaches of both teams.” Monday morning, with a bus warmed up in the parking lot of Joe’s Italian Deli (owned by Joe Tolomei, the Loggers' No. 1 investor) ready to convey the Loggers to Eugene for a potential doubleheader, Richmond called off the rest of the series and awarded the Northwest League championship to Grays Harbor. “Van Schley and TV comedian Bill Murray,” Ray Ryan wrote in the Daily World, “appeared in the deli, almost as if on cue.”"

In 1980, the franchise was once again the Grays Harbor Loggers for the team's last season.

== Bill Murray and the Loggers ==
In 1978 the team partnered with popular actor Bill Murray for a successful marketing stunt, one which attracted the national media spotlight. The cast of Saturday Night Live was asked to find something they've always wanted to do during the summer and for Murray it was to play professional baseball. He joined the team in July and took regular batting practice and was a cheerleader (as a non-playing coach) during games. Unbeknownst to the press, the team activated him and on July 26, 1978, during a 7-4 home game win against the Victoria Mussels, and watched by the 141 fans in attendance, Murray got to pinch hit during the eighth inning. The Mussels manager (Jim Chapman) had earlier brought in outfielder Jim Kirsch to pitch and said: "“Give him something good.” I threw a fastball down the middle of the plate and he whacked it. He put a great swing on it, which impressed me. But yeah, I pretty much grooved one to him. Bill was really nice about it. After the game he came up and said, “That meant the world to me.” ... He threw a soft one down the middle, probably a 75-mile-an-hour fastball. It was a gift." After the game the Loggers headed out by bus to play an away series against the Walla Walla Padres, and Bill Murray made the trip. "In the series opener, the Loggers took an 11-5 lead into the ninth inning. Once again, Bill Bryk called on pinch-hitter Bill Murray. But Padres reliever Randy (Randal) Miller wasn’t as charitable as Paul Kirsch, and struck out Murray on three pitches. After the game, Murray said, “I thought he would at least waste one on me after going 0-and-2. I didn’t have a clue.” Murray also downplayed his earlier base hit, describing Kirsch’s pitch as a “junior-high fastball.” Bill Murray's Logger baseball career had ended, and his stats were 2 games played, one hit in two pinch hit at bats, with a single and a strikeout. Unfortunately, nobody recorded or took pictures of Murray's at bats, though a fictionalized account was filmed with Loggers playing the Bellingham Mariners at Olympic Stadium that was shown as a segment on the October 28, 1978 special edition of Saturday Night Live.

Coincidentally, and curiously, on August 18, 1979, Bill Murray was invited to be a guest base coach and cheerleader for the same Victoria Mussels he faced in his first at bat.

== Ballpark ==
The Loggers and the Ports played at Olympic Stadium, located at 101 28th Street, Hoquiam, Washington and Pioneer Park in Aberdeen. The facility is still in use today.

== Notable players ==
- Bill Murray (1978)
- Jose Oquendo (1979)
- Tommy Jones (1976)
- Rickey Hill (1978)
- Mark Parent (1980)
- Luis Quiñones (1980)

== Seasons ==
Grays Harbor Loggers
Season	Total	Finished	Playoffs
1976 (Ports)	26 - 46	.361	3rd and last in North Division
1977 (Loggers)	22 - 44	.333	2nd in Independent Division
1978 (Loggers)	47 - 23	.671	1st in North Division; Beat Eugene Emeralds for Championship
1979 (Mets)	19 - 52	.268	4th and last in North Division
1980 (Loggers)	33 - 36	.478	4th and last in North Division
