= Howie Bedell =

American baseball player (born 1935)

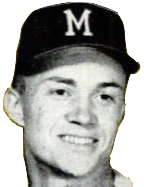
- Bedell in 1962
- Left fielder
- Born: September 29, 1935 (age 90); Clearfield, Pennsylvania, U.S.
- Batted: Left Threw: Right

MLB debut
- April 10, 1962, for the Milwaukee Braves

Last MLB appearance
- July 4, 1968, for the Philadelphia Phillies

MLB statistics
- Batting average: .193
- Home runs: 0
- Runs batted in: 3
- Hits: 28
- Stats at Baseball Reference

Teams
- Milwaukee Braves (1962); Philadelphia Phillies (1968)

Howard William Bedell (born September 29, 1935) is an American former Major League Baseball player, coach, and front-office administrator.

== Biography ==
An outfielder, Bedell played for the Milwaukee Braves in 1962 and the Philadelphia Phillies in 1968. He batted left-handed, threw right-handed, stood 6 feet 1 inch (1.85 m) tall and weighed 185 pounds (84 kg). Bedell graduated from Pottstown Senior High School and attended West Chester University.

In MLB, Bedell played in 67 games and registered 28 hits, three runs batted in and scored 15 runs. He batted .193. Fifty-eight of his 67 games played, all 15 of his runs scored, 27 of his 28 hits and two of his three RBIs were with the Braves. Bedell's lone RBI as a Phillie came in a game against the Los Angeles Dodgers at Dodger Stadium on June 8, 1968. Pinch-hitting in the top of the fifth inning, Bedell hit a sacrifice fly to score Tony Taylor for a run that ended Don Drysdale's string of 582/3 consecutive scoreless innings. Earlier that game, Drysdale had broken Walter Johnson's streak of 56 consecutive scoreless innings, set in 1913.

Bedell played almost 1,400 games in minor league baseball, and his active career stretched over 13 seasons (1957–1969). While in the American Association in 1961, Bedell recorded a 43-game hitting streak, which ended up tied for the league record after the league folded in 1997.

After his playing career ended, Bedell held both on- and off-field posts with MLB clubs. He was a coach with the Kansas City Royals (1984) and Seattle Mariners (1988), coordinator of player development for the Royals (1985) and Mariners (part of 1988), and farm director of the Phillies (1979–1980) and Cincinnati Reds (1990–1991). He also served as a manager in the Phillies' and Colorado Rockies' farm systems.

Bedell currently lives in Pottstown, Pennsylvania.
