= Northwest League =

Minor League Baseball Class High-A league based in the Pacific Northwest

- Upcoming season or competition: 2026 Northwest League season
- Formerly: Western International League (1937–1954); High-A West (2021)
- Classification: High-A (2021–present); Class A Short Season (1966–2020)
- Sport: Baseball
- Founded: 1955 (71 years ago)
- No. of teams: 6
- Countries: United States and Canada
- Most recent champion: Vancouver Canadians (2026)
- Most titles: Spokane Indians (9)
- Website: www.mlb.com/milb

The Northwest League is a Minor League Baseball league that operates in the Northwestern United States and Western Canada. A Class A Short Season league for most of its history, the league was promoted to High-A as part of Major League Baseball's 2021 reorganization of the minor leagues. The league operated as the High-A West in 2021, then resumed its original moniker in 2022.

== History ==
The Northwest League (or the Northwestern League) has existed in various forms since 1890, and has been in its current incarnation since 1955. The current NWL is the descendant of the Western International League (WIL), a Class B league from 1937 to 1951 (with a stoppage during World War II) and Class A from 1952 to 1954. The league reformed as the Northwest League and dropped to Class B for the 1955 season. The WIL had ten teams in its final season, with four in Canada.

In 1955, the Northwest League was formed, with seven charter teams: Salem Senators, Eugene Emeralds, Yakima Bears, Spokane Indians, Tri-City Braves, Wenatchee Chiefs, and Lewiston Broncs. The league switched to the short season schedule in 1966; between then and 1982, the NWL fluctuated between four, six, and eight clubs. In 1983, the league returned to an eight-team circuit, which it maintained through 2019.

The start of the 2020 season was postponed due to the COVID-19 pandemic before ultimately being cancelled on June 30. As part of Major League Baseball's 2021 reorganization of the minor leagues, the Northwest League was promoted to High-A, reduced to six teams, and renamed the "High-A West" for the 2021 season. The two dropped teams were the Boise Hawks and Salem-Keizer Volcanoes. Following MLB's acquisition of the rights to the names of the historical minor leagues, the High-A West was renamed the Northwest League in 2022.

== Current teams ==
Team	Founded	MLB affiliation	City	Stadium	Capacity
Eugene Emeralds	1955	San Francisco Giants	Eugene, Oregon	PK Park	4,000
Everett AquaSox	1995	Seattle Mariners	Everett, Washington	Everett Memorial Stadium	3,682
Hillsboro Hops	2013	Arizona Diamondbacks	Hillsboro, Oregon	Hillsboro Hops Ballpark	6,000
Spokane Indians	1898	Colorado Rockies	Spokane, Washington	Avista Stadium	6,803
Tri-City Dust Devils	2001	Los Angeles Angels	Pasco, Washington	Gesa Stadium	3,654
Vancouver Canadians	2000	Toronto Blue Jays	Vancouver, British Columbia	Nat Bailey Stadium	6,500

== Champions ==
League champions have been determined by different means since the Northwest League's formation in 1955. Except for 1956, 1960, and from 1966 to 1973, all seasons have ended with playoffs to determine a league champion.

The Spokane Indians have won nine championships, most in the league.

== Northwest League teams (1955–present) ==
- Bellingham Dodgers: 1973–1976
- Bellingham Mariners: 1977–1994
- Bellingham Giants: 1995–1996
- Bend Rainbows: 1970–1971
- Bend Timber Hawks: 1978
- Bend Phillies: 1981–1986
- Bend Bucks: 1987–1991
- Bend Rockies: 1992–1994
- Blue Mountain Bears: 1983
- Boise A's: 1975–1976
- Boise Buckskins: 1978
- Boise Hawks: 1987–2020
- Central Oregon Phillies: 1979–1980
- Coos Bay-North Bend A's: 1970–1973
- Eugene Emeralds: 1955–1968; 1974–present
- Everett AquaSox: 1995–present
- Everett Giants: 1984–1994
- Grays Harbor Loggers: 1977–1978; 1980
- Grays Harbor Mets: 1979
- Grays Harbor Ports: 1976
- Hillsboro Hops: 2013–present
- Lewiston Broncs: 1955–1974
- Medford Giants: 1967–1968
- Medford Dodgers: 1970–1971
- Medford A's: 1979–1987
- New Westminster Frasers: 1974
- Portland Mavericks: 1973–1977
- Portland Rockies: 1995–2000
- Rogue Valley Dodgers: 1969
- Salem-Keizer Volcanoes: 1997–2020
- Salem Senators: 1955–1960; 1977–1981
- Salem Dodgers: 1961–1965
- Salem Dodgers: 1988–1989
- Salem Angels: 1982–1987
- Seattle Rainiers: 1972–1976
- Southern Oregon A's: 1988–1995
- Southern Oregon Timberjacks: 1996–1999
- Spokane Indians: 1955–1956; 1972; 1983–present
- Tri-Cities Triplets: 1983–1986
- Tri-City A's: 1969
- Tri-City Angels: 1963–1964
- Tri-City Atoms: 1961; 1965–1968
- Tri-City Braves: 1955–1960
- Tri-City Dust Devils: 2001–present
- Tri-City Padres: 1970–1972
- Tri-City Ports: 1974
- Tri-City Triplets: 1973
- Vancouver Canadians: 2000–present
- Victoria Mussels: 1978–1979
- Victoria Blues: 1980
- Walla Walla Bears: 1969
- Walla Walla Phillies: 1970–1971
- Walla Walla Islanders: 1972
- Walla Walla Padres: 1973–1982
- Wenatchee Chiefs: 1955–1965
- Yakima Bears (original): 1955–1964
- Yakima Bears: 1990–2012
- Yakima Valley Braves: 1965–1966

=== Cities that have hosted NWL teams ===
==== British Columbia ====
- New Westminster: 1974 (1 season)
- Vancouver: 2000–2025 (26 seasons)
- Victoria: 1978–1980 (3 seasons)

==== Idaho ====
- Boise: 1975–1976, 1978, 1987–2020 (34 seasons)
- Lewiston: 1955–1974 (20 seasons)

==== Oregon ====
- Bend: 1970–1971, 1978–1994 (19 seasons)
- North Bend: 1970–1972 (3 seasons)
- Eugene: 1955–1968, 1974–2025 (65 seasons)
- Hillsboro: 2013–2025 (12 seasons)
- Keizer: (Shared with Salem) 1997–2020 (23 seasons)
- Medford: 1967–1971, 1979–1999 (26 seasons)
- Portland: 1973–1977, 1995–2000 (11 seasons)
- Salem: 1955–1965, 1977–1989, (shared with Keizer) 1997–2020 (45 seasons)

==== Washington ====
- Aberdeen: 1976–1980 (5 seasons)
- Bellingham: 1973–1996 (24 seasons)
- Everett: 1984–2025 (42 seasons)
- Seattle: 1972–1976 (5 seasons)
- Spokane: 1955–1956, 1972, 1983–2025 (46 seasons)
- Tri-Cities: 1955–1974, 1983–1986, 2001–2025 (46 seasons)
- Walla Walla: 1969–1983 (15 seasons)
- Wenatchee: 1955–1965 (11 seasons)
- Yakima: 1955–1966, 1990–2012 (35 seasons)

Eugene is the most-tenured city in the NWL, having fielded a team in all but five of the NWL's seasons (from 1969–73, they had a PCL franchise).

== Hall of Fame alumni ==
Eight alumni of the Northwest League are enshrined in the Baseball Hall of Fame:

- Bobby Cox - Salem Dodgers, 1961–62; inducted in 2014
- Ken Griffey Jr. – Bellingham Mariners, 1987; inducted in 2016
- Tony Gwynn – Walla Walla Padres, 1981; inducted in 2007
- Rickey Henderson – Boise A's, 1976; inducted in 2009
- Reggie Jackson – Lewiston Broncs, 1966; inducted in 1993
- Tony LaRussa – Lewiston Broncs, 1964; inducted in 2014
- Edgar Martínez – Bellingham Mariners, 1983; inducted in 2019
- Mike Piazza – Salem Dodgers, 1989; inducted in 2016
- Ozzie Smith – Walla Walla Padres, 1977; inducted in 2002

== Notable alumni ==
Sandy Alomar Jr. – Spokane Indians, 1984
Garret Anderson – Boise Hawks, 1990
Kevin Appier – Eugene Emeralds, 1987
Pedro Astacio – Yakima Bears, 1990
Garrett Atkins – Portland Rockies, 2000
Jim Bouton – Portland Mavericks, 1973 & 1977
Jason Bartlett – Eugene Emeralds, 2001
Glenn Beckert - Wenatchee Chiefs, 1963
Dante Bichette – Salem Angels, 1984
Carlos Beltrán – Spokane Indians, 1996
Dallas Braden – Vancouver Canadians, 2004
Kris Bryant - Boise Hawks, 2013
Bert Campaneris - Lewiston Broncs, 1963
Tom Candiotti - Victoria Mussels, 1979
José Canseco – Medford A's, 1983
Rico Carty - Yakima Valley Braves, 1962
Ron Cey - Tri-City Atoms, 1968
Aaron Cook – Portland Rockies, 1998
Ron Coomer - Medford A's, 1987
Chris Davis - Spokane Indians, 2006
Eric Davis – Eugene Emeralds, 1980–81
Mark DeRosa – Eugene Emeralds, 1996
Dick Dietz – Eugene Emeralds, 1962
Josh Donaldson - Boise Hawks, 2007
Dave Duncan - Lewiston Broncs, 1965
Andre Ethier – Vancouver Canadians, 2003
Todd Field – Portland Mavericks batboy, 1976–77
Chone Figgins – Portland Rockies, 1998
Chuck Finley – Salem Angels, 1985
George Foster – Medford Giants, 1968
Matt Franco – Portland Mavericks batboy, 1977
Julio Franco – Central Oregon Phillies, 1979
Tom Gordon – Eugene Emeralds, 1987
Jason Giambi – Southern Oregon A's, 1992
Carlos González – Yakima Bears, 2004
Khalil Greene – Eugene Emeralds, 2002
Pedro Guerrero – Bellingham Dodgers, 1974
Bob Hamelin – Eugene Emeralds, 1988
Dave Henderson - Bellingham Mariners, 1977
Félix Hernández – Everett AquaSox, 2003
Ken Hubbs- Wenatchee Chiefs, 1961
Ender Inciarte - Yakima Bears, 2010
Ian Kinsler -- Spokane Indians, 2003
John Kruk – Walla Walla Padres, 1981
Paul Konerko – Yakima Bears, 1994
Adam Jones – Everett AquaSox, 2003
John Lackey – Boise Hawks, 1999
Mark Langston - Bellingham Mariners, 1981
Ted Lilly - Yakima Bears, 1996
Tim Lincecum – Salem-Keizer Volcanoes, 2006
Kirk McCaskill – Salem Angels, 1982
Denis Menke - Yakima Valley Braves, 1960
Wade Miley - Yakima Bears, 2008
Rick Monday – Lewiston Broncos, 1965
Bill Murray – Grays Harbor Loggers, 1978
Joe Nathan – Bellingham Giants, 1995; Salem-Keizer Volcanoes, 1997
Claude Osteen - Wenatchee Chiefs, 1958
Troy Percival – Boise Hawks, 1991
Eduardo Pérez – Boise Hawks, 1991
Juan Pierre – Portland Rockies, 1998
Kevin Pillar - Vancouver Canadians, 2011
Buster Posey – Salem-Keizer Volcanoes, 2008
Mark Reynolds - Yakima Bears, 2004
Francisco Rodríguez – Boise Hawks, 1999
Kurt Russell – Bend Rainbows, Walla Walla Islanders, Portland Mavericks, 1971–73, 1977
Tim Salmon – Bend Bucks, 1989
Jeff Samardzija – Boise Hawks, 2006
Casey Sander – Seattle Rainiers, 1975
Pablo Sandoval – Salem-Keizer Volcanoes, 2005
Kyle Schwarber - Boise Hawks, 2014
Mike Scioscia – Bellingham Dodgers, 1976
Braden Shipley - Hillsboro Hops, 2014
Ted Sizemore - Tri-City Atoms, 1966
Marcus Stroman - Vancouver Canadians, 2012
Kurt Suzuki – Vancouver Canadians, 2004
Noah Syndergaard - Vancouver Canadians, 2011
Dansby Swanson - Hillsboro Hops, 2015
Mike Sweeney – Eugene Emeralds, 1992–93
Nick Swisher – Vancouver Canadians, 2002
Kevin Tapani - Medford A's, 1986
Miguel Tejada – Southern Oregon A's, 1995
Tom Treblehorn - Bend Rainbows, 1970
Trea Turner - Eugene Emeralds, 2014
Dan Uggla – Yakima Bears, 2001
Max Venable - Bellingham Dodgers, 1976
Shane Victorino – Yakima Bears, 2000
Omar Vizquel - Bellingham Mariners, 1985
Matt Williams - Everett Giants, 1986
Mitch Williams - Walla Walla Padres, 1982
Russell Wilson – Tri-City Dust Devils, 2010
Mike Zunino – Everett AquaSox, 2012

== See also ==
- Northwest League Manager of the Year Award
- Northwest League Most Valuable Player Award
- Sports league attendances
