= Bend Phillies =

Coordinates: 46.077°N 118.336°W

- 1979–1986; Bend, Oregon

Minor league affiliations
- Class: Class A Short Season
- League: Northwest League

Major league affiliations
- Previous teams: Philadelphia Phillies (1979-1986)

Minor league titles
- League titles (1): 1979
- Division titles (1): 1979

Team data
- Previous names: Central Oregon Phillies (1979-1980)
- Colors: Maroon, white
- Ballpark: Vince Genna Stadium

The Bend Phillies were a minor league baseball team located in Bend, Oregon. The Phillies were members of the Class A Short Season Northwest League from 1979 to 1986. Prior to 1981 the team was named the Central Oregon Phillies.

== History ==
Professional baseball returned to Bend with the expansion of the Northwest League in 1978. The franchise was named the Timber Hawks and affiliated with the Oakland Athletics. Timber Hawks owner Doug Emmans relocated the Timber Hawks south to Medford following the 1978. Upon relocating the club became the Medford Athletics as they continued their relationship with Oakland. Bend would not be without baseball long as Gene Davis obtained the rights for a new franchise. The club signed a player development contract with the Philadelphia Phillies and adopted their parent club's nickname paired with a regional moniker to be known as the Central Oregon Phillies.

The Phillies had a banner year in their inaugural season. The team posted a league best record 43-28 en route to a south division title. Central Oregon defeated north division winner Walla Walla in the league championship series 2-1 to claim the Northwest League crown. After the 1980 season Gene Davis sold the franchise to Portland businessman Jack Cain. In addition the sale, the club changed its name from Central Oregon to Bend. Jack Cain eventually became the president of the Northwest League and in an effort to avoid a conflict of interest he transferred ownership to his wife, Mary. In 1985 owner Jack Cain had contemplated changing the nickname to "Beavers", but ultimately decided against the switch.

The Phillies were unable to match the success of their first campaign of 1979. Following the 1986 season the Philadelphia Phillies ended their affiliation with the club. The decision was largely a result of Philadelphia's desire to move its minor league teams closer to the East Coast. Like Bend, the Phillies severed ties with their Triple-A affiliate Portland of the Pacific Coast League. Professional baseball remained in Bend with the Bend Bucks beginning play as an independent team 1987 before securing a player development contract with the California Angels.

== Ballpark ==
The Phillies played at Vince Genna Stadium located in Bend, Oregon.

== Season-by-season record ==
Season	PDC	Division	Finish	Wins	Losses	Win%	Postseason	Manager	Attendance
Central Oregon Phillies
1979	PHI	South	1st	43	28	.606	Defeated Walla Walla in championship series 2-1	Tom Harmon	18,610
1980	PHI	South	3rd	31	39	.443		P.J. Carey	28,486
Bend Phillies
1981	PHI	North	3rd	31	39	.443		P.J. Carey	19,719
1982	PHI	South	2nd	30	40	.429		Roly de Armas	28,334
1983	PHI	Oregon	3rd	32	37	.464		Jay Ward	29,063
1984	PHI	South	2nd	38	36	.514		Ramón Avilés	32,201
1985	PHI	Oregon	2nd	39	35	.527		P.J. Carey	30,507
1986	PHI	Oregon	4th	21	53	.284		Ed Pebly	29,766

Division winner	League champions

== Former players ==
Central Oregon Phillies players (1979–1980)
Bend Phillies players (1981–1986)

Preceded by Central Oregon Phillies	Northwest League franchise 1981–1986	Succeeded by Bend Bucks
