= Bellingham Giants =

- 1995–1996; Bellingham, Washington

Minor league affiliations
- Class: Class A-Short Season
- League: Northwest League
- Division: North

Major league affiliations
- Previous teams: San Francisco Giants (1995–1996)

Minor league titles
- Division titles (1): 1995

Team data
- Previous names: Bellingham Mariners (1977–1994); Bellingham Dodgers (1973–1976)
- Colors: Black, orange, white
- Previous parks: Joe Martin Field
- Owner(s)/ Operator(s): Sports Enterprises, Inc.

The Bellingham Giants were a Minor League Baseball team in the Class A-Short Season Northwest League, based in Bellingham, Washington, for two seasons (1995, 1996), and were an affiliate of the San Francisco Giants. After years of struggling attendance, co-owners Jerry Walker and William Tucker moved the franchise south to Keizer, Oregon, and began play in 1997 as the Salem-Keizer Volcanoes.

== History ==
The franchise arrived in 1973 as the Bellingham Dodgers, affiliated with the Los Angeles Dodgers. When Major League Baseball returned to Seattle in 1977, the expansion Mariners placed their first minor league affiliate in Bellingham. The club adopted the moniker of their parent club, taking the name Bellingham Mariners, but were commonly referred to as the "Baby M's."

Bellingham enjoyed a long affiliation with the Mariners, lasting eighteen years, through 1994. Following that season, the Mariners signed a player development contract with Everett, who had been a Giants affiliate since 1984, and Everett became the AquaSox. Seattle and San Francisco, essentially swapped affiliates as Bellingham inked an agreement with the Giants. Like their predecessors, who mirrored their parent clubs, the team took the name Giants.

Bellingham went 43–33 (.566) in 1995 to earn the top spot in the north division, and the Giants faced the Boise Hawks for the league crown. Boise bested Bellingham in the deciding game of the best-of-three NWL championship series. Despite winning a division title, the Giants struggled at the gate, and were last in the league in attendance.

The Giants returned in 1996 and were 39–36 (.520), a half-game behind the division winning Yakima Bears. Attendance woes continued as the Giants failed to eclipse fifty thousand in attendance. Following the season, the franchise relocated to Keizer, Oregon, opened a new $7 million ballpark in 1997, and rebranded as the Salem-Keizer Volcanoes.

== Ballpark ==
The Bellingham franchise played at Joe Martin Field, a venue with a seating capacity near 1,600. The park is currently the home of the Bellingham Bells of the West Coast League.

== Season-by-season record ==
Season	PDC	Division	Finish	Wins	Losses	Win%	Postseason	Manager	Attendance
Bellingham Giants
1995	SFG	North	1st	43	33	.566	Lost to Boise in championship series 1-2	Glenn Tufts	54,104
1996	SFG	North	2nd	39	36	.520		Shane Turner	48,417

Division winner	League champions

=== Former players ===
- Bellingham Giants players (1995–1996)

Preceded by Bellingham Mariners	Northwest League franchise 1995-1996	Succeeded by Salem-Keizer Volcanoes
