= Portland Mavericks =

- Founded in 1973 in Portland, Oregon; Based in Keizer, Oregon since 2021

Minor league affiliations
- Class: Independent (2021–present)
- Previous classes: Class A Short Season (1973–1977)
- League: Mavericks Independent Baseball League (2021–present)
- Previous leagues: Northwest League (1973–1977)

Minor league titles
- Division titles (4): 1973; 1975; 1976; 1977

Team data
- Name: Portland Mavericks (1973–present)
- Colors: Red, black, white
- Ballpark: Volcanoes Stadium (2021–present)
- Previous parks: Civic Stadium (1973–1977)
- Manager: Scott Binder

The Portland Mavericks are a baseball team located in Keizer, Oregon, who are charter members of the Mavericks Independent Baseball League, a four-team league created in 2021. The entire league, including the Mavericks, will play their games at Volcanoes Stadium in the Salem Metropolitan Statistical Area. The owners of the Salem-Keizer Volcanoes, a former San Francisco Giants' Minor League Baseball affiliate, bought the rights to the Mavericks to help create the league after the Giants ended the affiliation in 2020.

Prior to the Mavericks League, the Mavericks were an independent team based in Portland, Oregon. After the 1972 season, the Portland Beavers of the Pacific Coast League left Portland to become the Spokane Indians. The next year, the Mavericks were created as a short-season Class A team in the Northwest League. The team operated as an independent club in Portland for five seasons, until the Pacific Coast League returned in 1978. The Mavericks played their home games in Civic Stadium.

== History ==
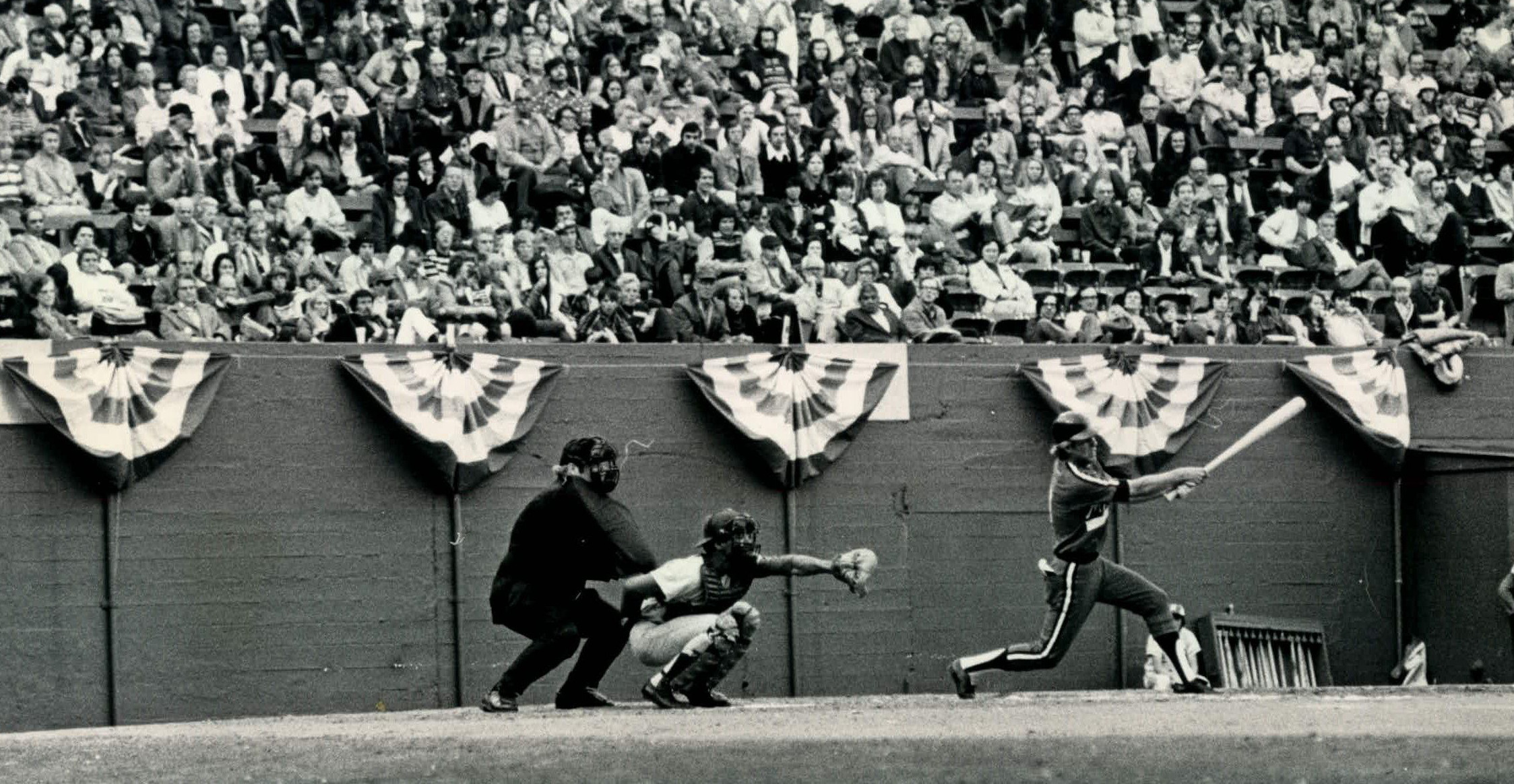
Portland Mavericks' home opener at Civic Stadium in June 1973

The Portland Mavericks were an independent professional baseball team in the northwestern United States, based in Portland, Oregon. They began to play in the short-season Class A Northwest League in 1973, after the Portland Beavers of the Pacific Coast League left after the 1972 season and became the Spokane Indians. The Mavericks operated as an independent club in Portland for five seasons, until the return of the PCL in 1978, and played home games on artificial turf at Civic Stadium in Portland.

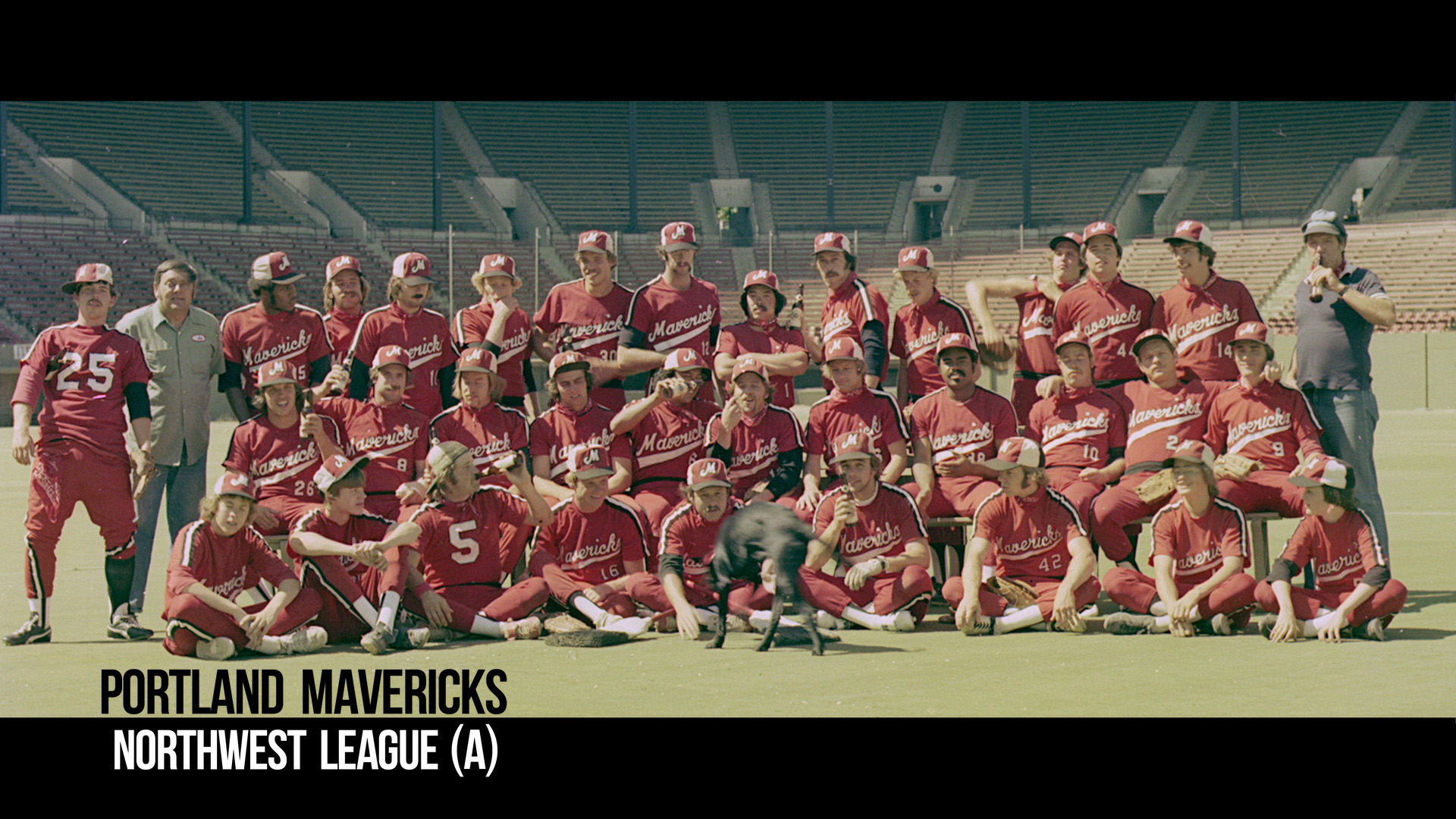
1977 Portland Mavericks Team Photo

The Mavericks were owned by ex-minor league player and television actor Bing Russell, and were initially the league's only independent club. As owner, Russell kept all corporate sponsorship outside the gates, and hired professional baseball's first female general manager, as well as the first Asian American general manager. Russell's motto in life was one three-lettered word: "fun."

Ex-major leaguers and never-weres who could not stop playing the game flocked to the team's June try-outs, which were always open to anyone who showed up. Most of the Mavericks players were older than their opponents and had been released by other organizations, not all for baseball reasons alone. For this reason, Russell kept a 30-man roster because he believed some players deserved to have one last season.

Among the various castoffs who made up the Mavericks' roster was former major league pitcher Jim Bouton, who made a comeback with the Mavericks in 1975 after having been out of baseball since retiring in 1970.

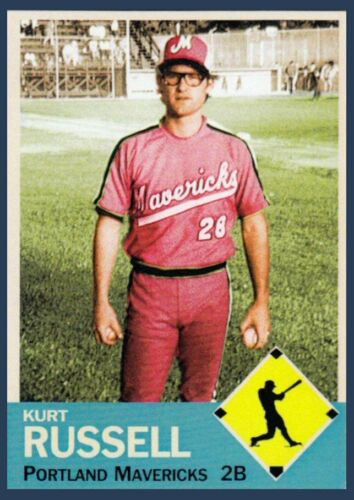
Kurt Russell Baseball Card

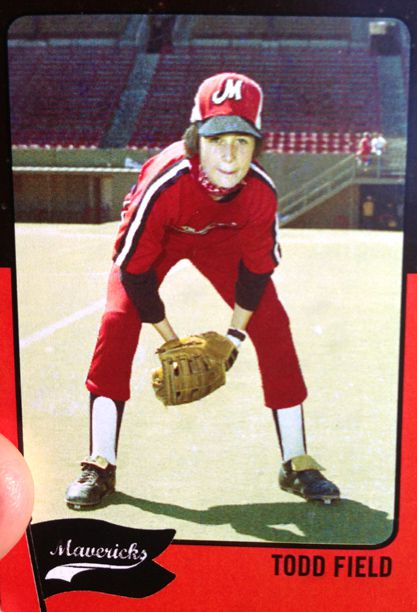
Todd Field Baseball Card

Bing Russell's son, actor Kurt Russell, played for the club for a month in its inaugural season in 1973. The first-year Mavericks' Hollywood connection was not limited to the Russells; manager Hank Robinson (1923–2012) was a character actor, and players Robbie Robinson, Jason Tatar, and Ken Medlock all had long careers as actors. Perhaps the team's most successful Hollywood story is that of Maverick batboy Todd Field, who went on to have a long career as an actor before becoming a six-time Academy Award-nominated writer and director.

== Franchise history ==
=== 1973 ===
Open tryouts for the team in early June 1973 drew 150 hopefuls, including one who hitchhiked across the country from Tennessee. Longtime minor-league star Hank Robinson managed the Mavericks to a record of 45–35 and a South Division title in 1973, their first season, but was suspended for a year after punching an umpire in late August. The players were paid $300 per month.

Following the first season, in November 1973, Bing Russell became the sole owner of the team, buying out co-owner John Carbray.

=== 1974 ===
The Mavericks finished 50–34 in 1974 under new manager Frank Peters, finishing in second place in the newly formatted West Division, two games behind the Bellingham Dodgers. Owner Bing Russell in November of that year promoted 24-year-old Lanny Moss to become the first female general manager in professional baseball.

=== 1975 ===
In 1975, again under manager Frank Peters, the Mavericks played to a 42–35 record, finishing in first place in the newly aligned North Division. Aging knuckleballer Jim Bouton pitched five games, going 4–1 with a 2.20 ERA.

The Mavericks met the defending champion Eugene Emeralds (54–25) in a best-of-three league championship series. The Emeralds swept, taking game one in Portland, 5–1, with Bouton taking the complete game loss for the Mavericks, and the next game in Eugene, 1–0, in front of 5,326 at their Civic Stadium.

=== 1976 ===
Under new manager Jack Spring, the Mavericks finished in first place in the North Division with a 40–32 record. (Team owner Bing Russell also served briefly as the interim manager in the dugout while manager Spring was out with a skull fracture in July.)

The Mavericks played the Walla Walla Padres of the South Division in the championship series in early September. The first game in Walla Walla at Borleske Stadium went to the Padres, 9–2. The second game in Portland the next afternoon was a 14–2 win for the Mavericks, which forced another game that night to decide the series, which Walla Walla won 7–6.

=== 1977 ===
In their final and finest season, the Mavericks played to a 44–22 record under player/manager Steven Collette. They had the best record in the league, and won the southern division by 22 games, their third division title in as many seasons. The Mavericks attracted 125,300 fans to 33 regular season home dates (an average of almost 3,800 per game), setting a record for the highest short-season attendance in minor league history.

Portland met the Bellingham Mariners, winners of the northern division at 42–26, in the championship series in late August. A noted member of the "Baby M's" was teenage outfielder Dave Henderson. The first game was in Bellingham and the home team won 6–2 before a paltry crowd of 575 at Civic Field, as Bouton again took the loss for the Mavericks. The series shifted to Portland, and 4,770 saw the Mavericks tie the series with eight runs in the fourth and cruised to a 10–1 win to force a third and final game in Portland the next night, Wednesday, August 31. The deciding game drew 7,805 fans, but the Mariners scored early and won 4–2 to secure the league title. Not known at the time, it was the final game in Portland Mavericks' history.

=== Dissolution ===
Subsequently, Major League Baseball regained interest in Portland; when the Pacific Coast League expanded for the 1978 season, they added a new Portland Beavers team in January. The Mavericks shut down after the PCL paid Russell the highest payout for a minor league territory in history — $206,000 — when Russell took the matter to arbitration.

In contrast to the popularity of the Mavericks, the 1978 PCL Beavers drew only 96,395 fans to 69 home games, an average of under 1,400 per game.

== Season-by-season record ==
Season	PDC	Division	Finish	Wins	Losses	Win%	Postseason	Manager	Attendance
Portland Mavericks
1973		South	1st	45	35	.563	NWL runner-up by virtue of record	Hank Robinson	80,705
1974		West	2nd	50	34	.614		Frank Peters	100,111
1975		North	1st	42	35	.545	Lost to Eugene in championship series 0-2	Frank Peters	119,253
1976		North	1st	40	32	.555	Lost to Walla Walla in championship series 1-2	Jack Spring	83,780
1977		Independent	1st	44	22	.666	Lost to Bellingham in championship series 1-2	Steve Collette	125,300

Division winner	League champions

== Notable players ==
- Jim Bouton — Bouton's landmark book Ball Four was set mostly in Seattle with the expansion Pilots in 1969, and Bouton returned with the Mavericks to pitch at Seattle's Sick's Stadium in 1975 after a five-year absence, tossing a 2-1 complete game win over the Rainiers before a crowd of 825. After the game, he said, "I told (Pilots' manager) Joe Schultz I'd pitch here again someday. I just didn't say at what level." Bouton pitched for the Mavericks again in 1977, eventually making it back to the majors with the Atlanta Braves the following year.
- Larry Colton — after having made one relief pitching appearance for the Philadelphia Phillies in 1968, Colton suffered a separated shoulder injury that forced his retirement. Colton returned to professional baseball at age 33 with the Mavericks in 1975, mostly playing first base but also pitching in three games. Colton later became a writer; his book Counting Coup won the Frankfurt eBook Award.
- Jeff Cox — an outfielder for the Mavericks in 1974, Cox eventually made it to the major leagues as an infielder with the Oakland Athletics and later became the third-base coach of the Chicago White Sox.
- Joseph Garza — known affectionately as "JoGarza", the light-hitting utility player was the team's unofficial mascot in 1976–1977, often wielding a broom on the field when the team was on the verge of a two-game "sweep."
- Rob Nelson — Bouton's teammate and pitching coach, Nelson worked with Bouton to develop Big League Chew bubble gum.
- Kurt Russell — team owner Bing Russell's son played for the club for a month in its inaugural season in 1973 and for one at-bat in 1977. His appearances in '73 were after suffering an injury to his rotator cuff earlier in the year while playing for the El Paso Sun Kings in the Texas League. The injury eventually forced his retirement from baseball and led to his return to acting.
- Dick Rusteck — a pitcher who played for the New York Mets in 1966, Rusteck pitched for the Mavericks from 1975 to 1977.
- Reggie Thomas — the Mavericks' best everyday player, he played mostly outfield for the team from 1973 to 1976, stealing 72 bases in 1974. Thomas was also a hotheaded player who responded to a benching once by coming after manager Frank Peters with a gun.
- Terry "T-Bone" Jones — supplied most of the muscle in the Mavericks' lineup.

== Legacy ==
The team's success helped inspire the establishment of several independent minor teams — in the Mavericks' final season in 1977, three of the six teams in the league were independent. The following year saw four independents among the eight teams. The movement culminated in the establishment of several independent minor leagues beginning in the 1990s, including the Northern League.

== Popular culture ==
A documentary on the team, The Battered Bastards of Baseball, debuted at the 2014 Sundance Film Festival, inspired by an earlier documentary, "Farewell Portland Beavers" which was the first to feature The Portland Mavericks, and aired on Portland TV station KOIN-TV in 1993, produced by Portland native, Kirk Findlay and Findlay Films.

== 2014 ==
On July 29, 2014, the Portland Mavericks Baseball Club, Inc., was re-incorporated with the Secretary of the State of Oregon and is currently in good standing. The Legacy team provides in person and is in development with the Professional Baseball League along with other 11 other teams to start the league around the country and in Portland, Oregon.

== 2021 Return ==
In 2020, as part of MiLB's realignment, the San Francisco Giants' ended their 23-year Minor League Baseball (MiLB) affiliation with the Salem-Keizer Volcanoes. After Volcanoes ownership bought the rights to the Mavericks and revived the team to create the Mavericks Independent Baseball League in 2021, a four-team league that would play all of its games at Volcanoes Stadium in Keizer, Oregon. The Mavericks' first game in the new league's inaugural season was played on May 13, 2021.
