= Roseburg Shamrocks =

- 1904; Roseburg, Oregon

Minor league affiliations
- Class: Class D (1904)
- League: Oregon State League (1904)

Major league affiliations
- Team: None

Minor league titles
- League titles (0): None

Team data
- Name: Roseburg Shamrocks (1904)
- Ballpark: Unknown (1904)

The Roseburg Shamrocks were a minor league baseball team based in Roseburg, Oregon. In 1904, the Shamrocks briefly played as members of the Class D level Oregon State League before disbanding during the season.

== History ==
Roseburg, Oregon hosted early semi-professional baseball clubs, with the first Roseburg baseball team forming in 1867.

The 1904 Roseburg Shamrocks began minor league baseball play in Roseburg, Oregon, as the Shamrocks became charter members of the Class D level Oregon State League. The four–team league began play on April 8, 1904, in what would be a brief season. The Eugene Blues, Salem Raglans and Vancouver Soldiers teams joined Roseburg as charter members to begin the season. League salaries were capped at $600.

After the season began, the Oregon State League was not officially admitted to minor league baseball by the National Association until it vacated the Vancouver, Washington franchise. The National Association ruled Vancouver, Washington was within the territorial limit of the Portland, Oregon franchise of the Pacific Coast League. To meet the demand, Vancouver, with a record of 3–8 moved to Albany, Oregon on May 18, 1904, and became the Albany Rollers. The other three cities remained intact, but the league played a brief season.

On June 4, 1904, a game between Albany and Roseburg teams required the teams to travel to the Vaughn Street baseball field in Portland in order to play their doubleheader, due to a facility issue.

On July 6, 1904, the Roseburg Shamrocks disbanded, with the Eugene Blues folding on the same day. While travel costs and low support were cited as a reason for folding, team turmoil may have also played a role. In addition to funding issues, it was reported that on July 5, 1904, during their last game, Roseburg Shamrock players had an argument with manager Turkey Morrow. Morrow immediately quit his position and departed for Roseburg without the team. The local Roseburg The Plaindealer, published a letter to the editor saying, "nothing kills [a] sport quicker than empty benches." The loss of the two teams caused the Oregon State League to permanently disband on the same day.

The Roseburg Shamrocks were in fourth place when the franchise and league folded. Roseburg ended the Oregon State League season with a record of 15–25, playing the abbreviated season under manager Turkey Morrow. Roseburg finished 12.0 games behind the first place Salem Raglans. In the complete final standings, Roseburg followed the Salem (27–13), the Eugene Blues (22–19) and Albany Rollers (17–24).

The Oregon State League never reformed. Roseburg, Oregon has not hosted another minor league team.

== The ballpark ==
The name of the Roseburg minor league home ballpark is not directly referenced. Sources indicate both River Front Park and Gaddis City Park were in existence during the era.

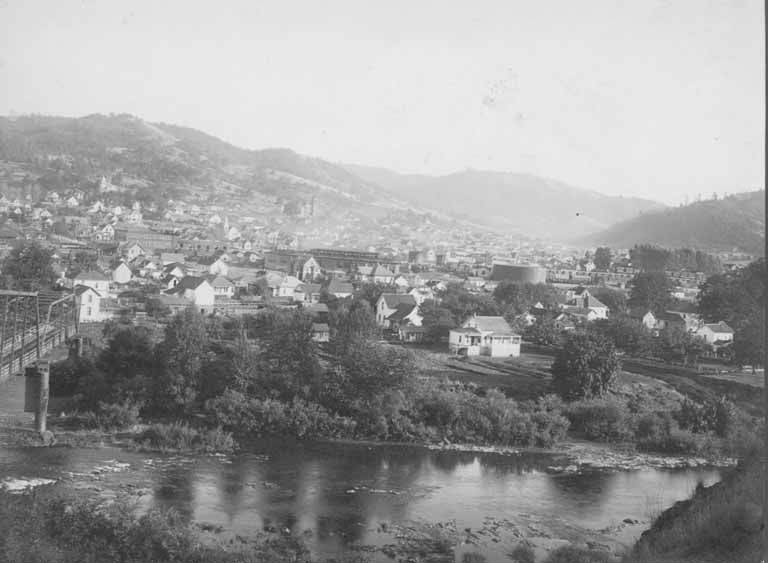
(1910) North Umpqua River. Roseburg, Oregon

== Timeline ==
Year(s)	# Yrs.	Team	Level	League
1904	1	Roseburg Shamrocks	Class D	Oregon State League

== Year–by–year records ==
Year	Record	Finish	Manager	Playoffs/Notes
1904	15–25	4th	Turkey Morrow	Team and league folded July 6

== Notable alumni ==
- Hunky Shaw (1904)

=== See also ===
Roseburg Shamrocks players
