= Vancouver, Washington minor league baseball history =

Vancouver, Washington minor league baseball teams
- 1904–1918; (1904, 1918); Vancouver, Washington

Minor league affiliations
- Class: Class D (1904); Class B (1918)
- League: Oregon State League (1904); Pacific Coast International League (1918)

Major league affiliations
- Team: None

Minor league titles
- League titles (0): None

Team data
- Name: Vancouver Soldiers (1910); Vancouver Beavers (1918)
- Ballpark: Unknown (1904, 1918)

Vancouver, Washington hosted minor league baseball teams in the 1904 and 1918 seasons. Vancouver teams played as members of the 1904 Class D level Oregon State League and the 1918 Class B level Pacific Coast International League.

Baseball Hall of Fame member Joe McGinnity played for the 1918 Vancouver Beavers.

== History ==
=== 1904 Oregon State League ===
Minor league baseball began in Vancouver, Washington with the 1904 Vancouver Soldiers, who began play as charter members of the four–team Class D level Oregon State League, before the franchise was forced to relocate during the season. The Oregon State League began play, with Vancouver joining the teams from Eugene, Oregon (Eugene Blues), Roseburg, Oregon (Roseburg Shamrocks) and Salem, Oregon (Salem Raglans) in the four–team league. Some sources erroneously have the Vancouver Soldiers franchise based in Vancouver, Canada.

On May 18, 1904, the Vancouver Soldiers, with a 3–8 record, moved from Vancouver, Washington to Albany, Oregon. The team then continued play as the Albany Rollers. The move was necessary because the Oregon State League was not admitted to the National Association governing body until the league vacated the Vancouver, Washington franchise. The National Association determined that the Vancouver franchise was infringing on another minor league team, as Vancouver was deemed to be in the regional territory of the Portland Browns of the Pacific Coast League.

After the Vancouver franchise relocated to Albany, the Oregon State League permanently folded on July 6, 1904. The league folded after both the Eugene and Roseburg franchises folded on July 6. After compiling a 14–16 record while based in Albany, the Vancouver/Albany team finished the season in 3rd place with a 17–24 overall record. Playing under managers Fred Gregory and E.P. Preble, the Vancouver/Albany team finished 9.5 games behind the first place Salem Raglans in the final Oregon State League Standings.

=== 1918 Pacific Coast International League ===
Minor league baseball returned to Vancouver, Washington in 1918. The 1918 Vancouver Beavers joined as charter members of the Pacific Coast International League, during the season. The Pacific International League had formed as a six–team Class B level league, evolving from the 1917 Northwestern League. After the season had begun, the Vancouver, British Columbia franchise relocated to Vancouver, Washington. On June 25, 1918, the Vancouver, British Columbia based Vancouver Beavers moved to Vancouver, Washington with a 26–28 record, keeping the team "Beavers" moniker. Previously, the Tacoma Tigers and Spokane Indians franchises had folded on May 26, 1918, leaving the league with four teams.

Vancouver, B.C. owner Robert Brown had disagreements over the travel costs of the league and had sought to change the league schedule, offering teams money to play their home games in Vancouver B.C. The Pacific Coast International League stripped the team from Brown and relocated the franchise, despite the team drawing well in Vancouver B.C.

Shortly after the Vancouver, Washington franchise began play, the Pacific Coast International League folded. On July 7, 1918, the Vancouver franchise had an 0–11 record after the relocation at the time the league folded. The combined Vancouver teams finished the 1918 season with an overall record of 26–39 to finish in fourth place. Playing under managers Robert Brown and James A. Hamilton in the two locations, the team finished 16.0 games behind the first place Seattle Giants in the final standings. The continuation of World War I, the Spanish flu pandemic, as well as local factory work times all contributed to the demise of the 1918 league. The league reformed in 1919 as the Northwest International League with a Vancouver B.C franchise, but without a Vancouver, Washington franchise.

Baseball Hall of Fame member Joe McGinnity played for the 1918 Vancouver Beavers, compiling a 2–7 record with a 3.30 ERA at age 47.

Vancouver, Washington has not hosted another minor league team.

In 2011, talks took place to relocate the Class A level Yakima Bears franchise to Vancouver, Washington. The Yakima Bears franchise eventually relocated to Oregon and became the Hillsboro Hops.

== The ballpark ==
The name of the home ballpark for Vancouver minor league teams is unknown.

== Timeline ==
Year(s)	# Yrs.	Team	Level	League
1904	1	Vancouver Soldiers	Class D	Oregon State League
1918	1	Vancouver Beavers	Class B	Pacific Coast International League

== Year-by-year records ==
Year(s)	Record	Place	Managers	Playoffs/Notes
1904	17–24	3rd	Fred Gregory / E.P. Preble	Moved to Albany (3–8) May 18; League folded July 8
1918	26–39	4th	Robert Brown / James A. Hamilton	Vancouver, B.C, (26–28) moved to Vancouver, WA June 25; League folded July 7

== Notable alumni ==
=== Baseball Hall of Fame alumni ===
Joe McGinnity (1918)

=== Notable alumni ===
- Ray French (1918)
- Lafayette Henion (1918)
- Cy Neighbors (1918)
- Kid Willson (1918)

=== See also ===
Vancouver Beavers players
