= Dick Rusteck =

American baseball player (born 1941)

- Pitcher
- Born: July 12, 1941 (age 84); Chicago, Illinois, U.S.
- Batted: Right Threw: Left

MLB debut
- June 10, 1966, for the New York Mets

Last MLB appearance
- October 2, 1966, for the New York Mets

MLB statistics
- Win–loss record: 1–2
- Strikeouts: 9
- Earned run average: 3.00
- Stats at Baseball Reference

Teams
- New York Mets (1966)

Richard Frank Rusteck (born July 12, 1941) is an American former left-handed pitcher in Major League Baseball who played for the New York Mets during the 1966 season. He is most widely known as one of the few pitchers to deliver a shutout in his first major league game, which was in a match against the Cincinnati Reds on June 10, 1966.

== Playing career ==
=== Early years ===
Rusteck was born in Chicago, Illinois. The 1963 Notre Dame graduate made three stops in 1965 en route to the New York Mets. All three contained a large measure of success. He began the year at Greenville with a 2.14 earned run average in 21 innings. Moving on to Auburn, NY, he fashioned a 3–0 record in 44 innings and a 1.64 earned run average. His last stop was Williamsport in the Eastern League where he completed the year throwing 50 innings with a 1.98 earned run average although he won only one of six decisions. He was 6–4 at Jacksonville in 1966.

=== New York Mets ===
Rusteck was 24 years old when he broke into the big leagues on June 10, 1966, with the New York Mets. He threw a shutout, the only Mets pitcher to do so in an MLB debut. After his impressive debut, he gave up five runs in one inning against the St. Louis Cardinals in his second game for his first major league loss. He pitched in six more games without a victory before returning to the minor leagues.

=== Back to the minors ===
Rusteck spent another eleven years in the minor leagues hoping to regain his initial success. His best season statistically was 1971, when he went 17–8 with a 2.40 earned run average for the Charlotte Hornets, the Double-A affiliate of the Minnesota Twins. While it earned him a shot at Triple-A in the Philadelphia Phillies organization the following year, his ERA ballooned to 5.16. After sitting out the 1973 season, he played for four seasons in the Northwest League with the independent Portland Mavericks and Salem Senators before retiring.
