= Roto-Rooter Park =

Baseball park in Keizer, Oregon

Coordinates: 45.015°N 122.994°W

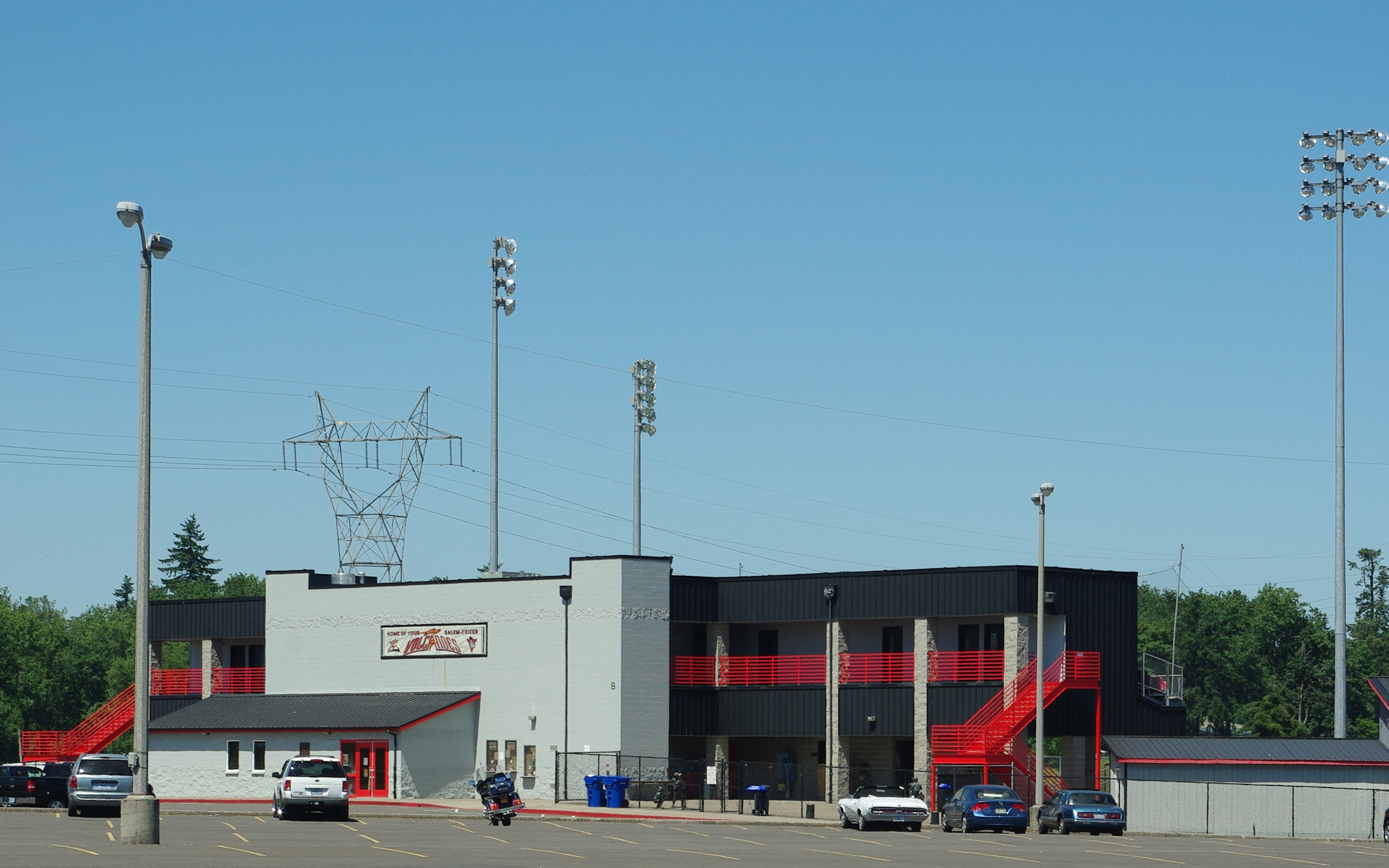
- Main grandstand in 2009

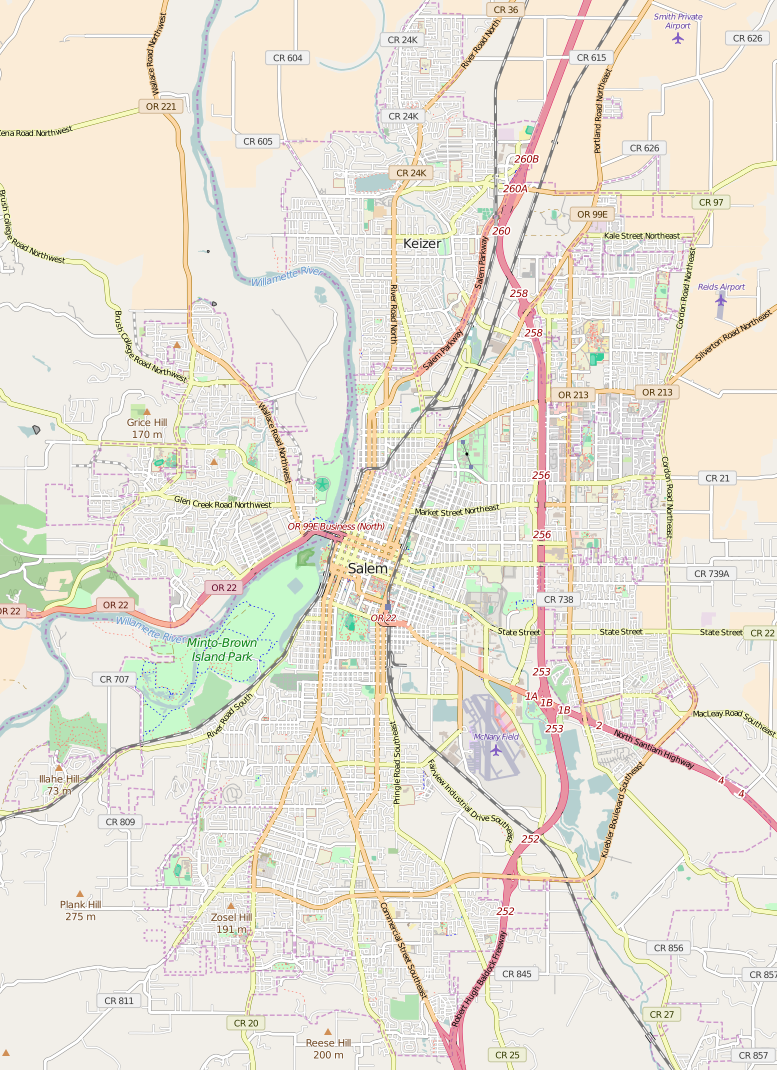
- Location in Keizer, Oregon Roto-Rooter Park (Oregon)
- Former names: Volcanoes Stadium (1997–2025)
- Location: 6700 Field of Dreams Way; Keizer, Oregon
- Owner: Sports Enterprises Inc.
- Operator: Sports Enterprises Inc.
- Capacity: 4,254 seats. 6,000 including berm areas.
- Surface: Artificial Grass
- Field size: Left – 325 ft (99 m); Center – 400 ft (122 m); Right – 325 ft (99 m)

Construction
- Groundbreaking: January 6, 1997
- Opened: June 22, 1997
- Cost: $6.8 million ($13.6 million in 2025)
- Architect: Arbuckle Costic Architects

Tenants
- Salem-Keizer Volcanoes (NWL/MavL) (1997–present); Campesinos de Salem-Keizer (MavL) (2021–present); Salem Senators (MavL) (2021–present); Portland Mavericks (MavL) (2021–present); Corban Warriors (NAIA) (2018–present)

Roto-Rooter Park (formerly Volcanoes Stadium) is a minor league baseball park in the northwest United States, located in Keizer, Oregon. It is the home field of the Mavericks Independent Baseball League, including the Salem-Keizer Volcanoes, formerly the Class A Short Season affiliate of the San Francisco Giants in the Northwest League.

Nicknamed "Oregon's Field of Dreams", the park opened as Volcanoes Stadium 29 years ago in 1997 and has a capacity of 4,254 people. It is adjacent to Interstate 5, just beyond the right field fence, and sits at an approximate elevation of 150 feet (45 m) above sea level. The Volcanoes have won five Northwest League championships, in 1998, 2001, 2006, 2007, and 2009. The team moved to Salem-Keizer in 1997, after eleven years in Everett, Washington and two in Bellingham. In 2025, the park was renamed following a naming rights agreement with the plumbing company Roto-Rooter.

In 1999, the park received an honorable mention award from the Salem chapter of the American Institute of Architects.

== Mavericks Independent Baseball League ==
Due to the COVID-19 pandemic, the 2020 Minor League Baseball season was cancelled. Following the cancelled season, Major League Baseball took direct control of Minor League Baseball. The Northwest League was elevated to the High-A classification and contracted to six teams. The Volcanoes, along with the Boise Hawks, were not extended an invitation to continue as a franchise affiliated with a major league organization. The team, however, promised to continue playing in some form in 2021.

On January 26, 2021, the Volcanoes announced the creation of the Mavericks Independent Baseball League, set to begin play in May 2021 with four teams all playing their home games at the then Volcanoes Stadium: the Volcanoes, the Campesinos de Salem-Keizer (previously the Volcanoes' Copa de la Diversión alter-ego), and the revivals of the Portland Mavericks (an infamous independent Northwest League team which played from 1973 to 1977) and the Salem Senators (a name used by numerous Northwest League teams based in Salem throughout the 20th century).

== Renovations ==
The park has been upgraded since its construction. Among the largest additions were a 5,000-square-foot (460 m^{2}) indoor hitting facility with four batting cages, a 1,200-square-foot (110 m^{2}) group hospitality building, and a 1,000-square-foot (93 m^{2}) weight room in 2018. Other features of the park include a jumbotron with live video and instant replay capabilities, a children's play area, concessions, an on-field "group party patio", an Entertainment Deck, and 4Topps-brand mesh stadium seating. Over 300 upper box seats were added and the park's ticket office and team merchandise store were expanded. A VIP Hospitality Skybox Suite was added to complement the park's other ten skybox suites.

== Other uses ==
Roto-Rooter Park is used for other events, including RV shows, birthday parties, and concerts.

The park hosts the Corban Warriors, the baseball team of Corban University in Salem, along with Oregon's state high school baseball championships and local Little League teams.

Under head coach Mike Bellotti, the University of Oregon Ducks played their spring football game at the park in early May 1998.
