= Salem-Independence (minor league baseball team) =

Salem (May 12–May 29, 1893; July 8–July 19, 1893) Independence (May 29–July 8, 1893)
- 1893–1893; (1893); Greater Salem

Minor league affiliations
- Previous classes: None (see Minor League Baseball)
- League: Oregon State League

Major league affiliations
- Previous teams: None

Minor league titles
- League titles: None

Team data
- Previous names: None

Salem-Independence was the name of a professional baseball team which was founded in May 1893 and folded in July of that year. The team was a member of the fleeting Oregon State League. Originally, the team was scheduled to play exclusively in Salem, Oregon, however, due to financial difficulties, the owner was forced to sell the team to a banker in Independence. On July 8, 1893, it was announced that the team was to return to Salem where they played the remainder of the season. Soon after, the team folded and withdrew from the league. However, it was later reported that the Salem team traveled to the San Francisco area to play amateur teams.

== Establishment ==
When the Oregon State League was officially formed in May 1893, it was announced that a franchise would be established in Salem, Oregon, as well as Portland, Albany and Oregon City. The league held a convention for the league in Salem on May 11 where they revealed the official rules and by-laws. W. M. Hunt, of the Salem club, was named league president. On May 22, Salem withdrew from the league. H. Hershberg, a banker from Independence, Oregon agreed to back the team financially if they were relocated to Independence, which they were. Albert Collet was hired to be the team's manager.

== Regular season ==
The team's roster at the being of the season was John McGreavy, pitcher; Fred Strand, shortstop and pitcher; Kurts Billings, catcher; Jack Cook, first baseman; J. McCarthy, left fielder; T. F. Thompson, center fielder; George Sharp, right fielder; and Albert Collet, second baseman. The first game of the season for Independence was played on June 3 against Oregon City. Independence, who was the home team, was victorious, 16–8. Most of Independence's players had just returned from training camp in California.

On July 8, it was announced that the Independence team would be transferred to Salem. The first games would talk place in that town on July 15 and 16 at the ball park near Oak Grove and The Oregon State Fair Grounds. The team management was transferred to Minto, of Salem. In their first game as Salem on July 9, the team beat Albany, 9–8. It was announced that Salem's first home game, which was to be played against Oregon City, would start at 3:00 p.m. on Saturday, July 15. Admission to the game was set a twenty-five cents. Salem unveiled their new blue pants, white shirt uniform for their July 15 contest. Salem swept both games from Oregon City. Their first game was won by a score of 12–6. Their second game finished with a score of 16–9. It was announced on July 19 that the team was folding and would no longer be a member of the Oregon State League. However, shortly after that announcement, another report stated that the Salem club was going to travel to San Francisco to play against other teams.
