= Tony Torcato =

American baseball player

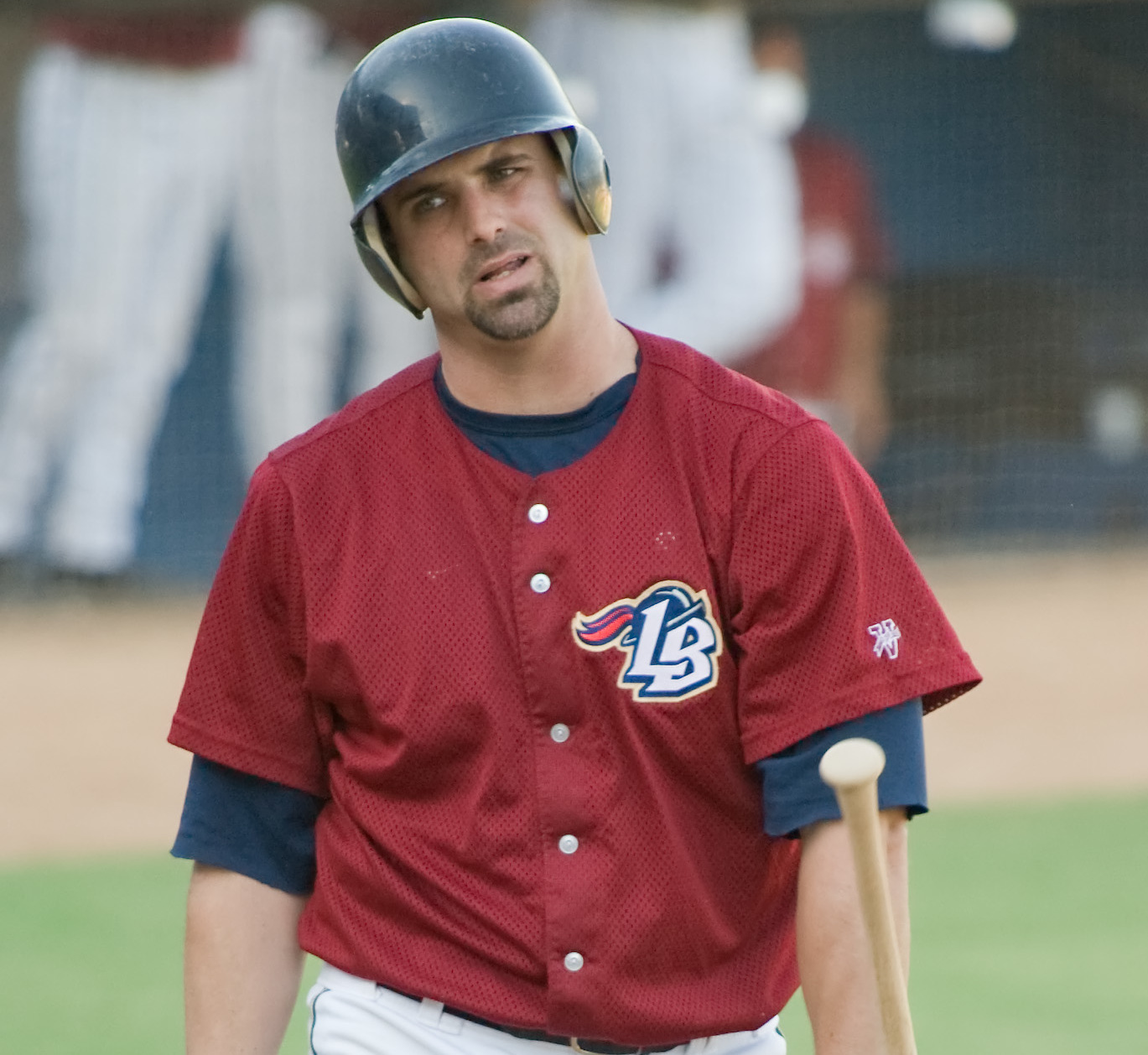
- Torcato with the Long Beach Armada in 2008
- Outfielder
- Born: October 25, 1979 (age 46); Woodland, California, U.S.
- Batted: Left Threw: Right

MLB debut
- July 26, 2002, for the San Francisco Giants

Last MLB appearance
- April 21, 2005, for the San Francisco Giants

MLB statistics
- Batting average: .298
- Runs batted in: 3
- Stats at Baseball Reference

Teams
- San Francisco Giants (2002–2005)

Anthony Dale Torcato (born October 25, 1979, in Woodland, California) is an American former Major League Baseball player.

== Professional career ==
Torcato was drafted in the 1st round (19th overall) of the 1998 Major League Baseball draft by the San Francisco Giants. Before being drafted, Torcato signed a letter of intent to play college baseball at UNLV.

He made his MLB debut on July 26, 2002, as the starting right fielder for the Giants against the Los Angeles Dodgers and singled to right field in his first at-bat off of the Dodgers Hideo Nomo. He played in parts of four seasons in Major League Baseball and a total of 8 years in the San Francisco Giants organization before becoming a free agent after the 2005 season.

In 2006, Torcato started the baseball season in the Italian Baseball League with Bbc Grosseto, then signed with the Chicago White Sox, who assigned him to the AAA Charlotte Knights.

In 2007, Torcato signed with the Seattle Mariners but was released toward the end of Spring Training.

In 2008, Torcato signed with the Long Beach Armada and the Chico Outlaws of the Golden Baseball League.

In 2021, Torcato became the manager of the Salem-Keizer Volcanoes in the Mavericks Independent Baseball League based out of Salem Oregon.
