= Joe Martin Stadium =

Baseball park in Bellingham, Washington, US

Joe Martin Field
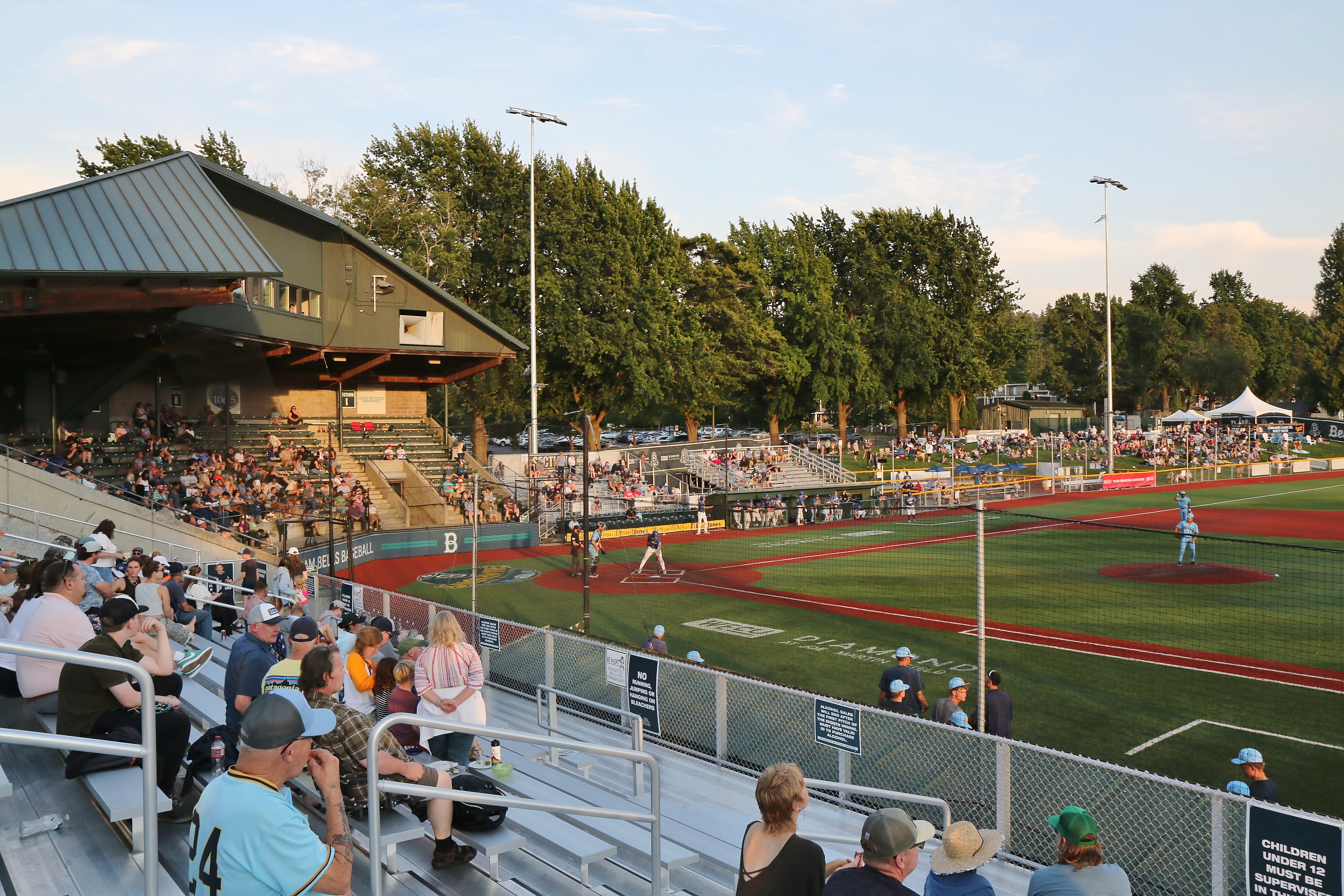
- View from the grandstand during a Bellingham Bells game in 2026
- Interactive map of Joe Martin Field
- Former names: Civic Field (1963–1980), Joe Martin Field (1980-Present)
- Location: 1221 Potter Street; Bellingham, Washington, U.S.
- Coordinates: 48.747°N 122.46°W
- Capacity: 1,600
- Surface: FieldTurf (2015– ) Natural grass (1963–2014)
- Field size: Left Field – 325 ft (99 m); Center Field – 380 ft (116 m); Right Field – 320 ft (98 m)

Construction
- Opened: 1963, 63 years ago

Tenants
- Bellingham Bells (WBA) (1963-1988); Bellingham Dodgers (NWL) (1973–1976); Bellingham Mariners (NWL) (1977–1994); Bellingham Giants (NWL) (1994–1996); Bellingham Bells (WCL) (1999–present)

Bellingham (the United States)
Bellingham (Washington (state))

Joe Martin Field is a baseball park in the northwest United States, located in Bellingham, Washington. It was a minor league ballpark in the Class A-Short Season Northwest League for 24 seasons, from 1973 through 1996.

The ballpark hosted three different NWL teams. The Bellingham Dodgers arrived in 1973 and stayed for four seasons. They were replaced in 1977 by the most well-known tenant, the Bellingham Mariners (or "Baby M's"), who played from 1977 through 1994 and gave big-league Mariners fans a glimpse of the future with players like Ken Griffey Jr., Edgar Martínez, Dave Henderson, and Dave Valle. After 18 seasons and four league championships, the Mariners moved their NWL ballclub closer to Seattle at Everett. The San Francisco Giants brought their affiliate to town where they played for two years (1995–96), then moved south to Oregon and became the Salem-Keizer Volcanoes in 1997.

In 1999, it became the home of the Bellingham Bells of the Pacific International League (PIL). The Bells played in the PIL for six years. In 2005, the team chose to become one of the founding franchises of the West Coast Collegiate Baseball League. Today, the league was later renamed the West Coast League and features some of the finest collegiate players in the country. Each summer the Bells play around 30 home games at Joe Martin Field as part of their WCL schedule which features teams from Washington, Oregon, Alberta and British Columbia. In 2014, the natural grass playing surface was replaced with synthetic FieldTurf; the renovation cost about $1.44 million and was completed in March 2015.

The field has an unorthodox southwest alignment (home plate to center field); the recommended alignment is east-northeast, nearly opposite. Its elevation is approximately 140 feet (43 m) above sea level.

== Notable People that played at Joe Martin Field ==
Joe Nathan	Derek Lowe	Mike Hampton
Ken Griffey Jr.	Edgar Martínez	Darnell Coles
Ed Nunez	Mike Scioscia	Dave Stewart
Rick Sutcliffe	Pedro Guerrero	Dave Henderson
Dave Valle	Jeffrey Leonard	Rick Sutcliffe
Rudy Law	Mike Scioscia	Deivi Cruz
Joe Nathan	Russ Ortiz	Joe Fontenot
Yorvit Torrealba	Ozzie Virgil, Jr.	Shane Turner
Mike Caruso	Ken Vining	Ezra Lacina
