= Bellingham Mariners =

Minor league baseball team (1977–1994)

- 1977–1994; Bellingham, Washington

Minor league affiliations
- Class: Class A-Short Season
- League: Northwest League

Major league affiliations
- Previous teams: Seattle Mariners (1977–1994); Los Angeles Dodgers (1973–1976)

Minor league titles
- League titles (4): 1977; 1980; 1986; 1992
- Division titles (7): 1977; 1980; 1981; 1983; 1986; 1992; 1993

Team data
- Previous names: Bellingham Dodgers (1973–1976)
- Colors: Navy blue, silver, northwest green
- Ballpark: Joe Martin Field

Location in the United States

The Bellingham Mariners were a Minor League Baseball team in the Class A-Short Season Northwest League, based in Bellingham, Washington. The club served as the Seattle Mariners' short-season affiliate from 1977 to 1994.

== History ==
Major League Baseball returned to Seattle in 1977 with the expansion Mariners of the American League. Bellingham signed a player development contract with Seattle and adopted their parent club's identity, taking the name Mariners. Bellingham had an agreement with the Los Angeles Dodgers from 1973 to 1976 and was called the Bellingham Dodgers.

Also referred to as Baby M's, the team would serve as Seattle's only affiliate in their inaugural season. The Northwest League had two divisions, one for teams with affiliations and the other for independents. Bellingham won the affiliate division with a 42–26 record and played the Portland Mavericks for the league championship. In a best of three series, Bellingham and Portland split the first two games. The Baby M's held off the Mavericks by a score of 4–2 in the decisive game to claim the 1977 Northwest League crown. Bobby Floyd earned the league's manager of the year award. The Mariners continued their on-field success with nearly identical records, going 41–30 and 41–31 in 1978 and 1979, respectively.

In 1980, Bellingham amassed a 45–25 en route to a North Division title. The Baby M's faced the Eugene Emeralds in the league championship series, which they split during the first two games. The decisive third game was cancelled due to rain; as a result, the Mariners and Emeralds were named Northwest League co-champions. The club witnessed a significant jump in attendance, with 42,292 passing through the turnstiles.

Seeking to repeat as league champions, the Baby M's claimed the north division in 1981. Bellingham faced the Medford A's in the championship series but were swept in two games. Two seasons later in 1983, with a roster that included future Hall of Famer Edgar Martinez, the Mariners claimed the division title with a 40–28 record. Bellingham was again defeated by a large margin by Medford in the championship series. In 1984 and 1985, the Baby M's posted mirror finishes at 39-35 taking second in the Washington division standings.

In 1987, 17-year-old Ken Griffey Jr. hit his first professional home run while on the road at Everett Memorial Stadium on June 18. A plaque was placed on the sidewalk outside the stadium where the ball landed.

Despite on-field success and a steady stream of Mariners prospects, the club struggled with poor attendance. Following the 1994 season, the Mariners ended their relationship with Bellingham. Seattle moved their affiliation south to Everett were the team assumed a new identity as the Everett AquaSox. Everett, who had been affiliated with the San Francisco Giants, swapped with Seattle and moved their short-season affiliation to Bellingham. Bellingham assumed their parent club's moniker to become the Bellingham Giants in 1995. The city government demurred on funding $100,000 in renovations to the team's ballpark amid the affiliation change.

== Ballpark ==
Bellingham played at Joe Martin Field, a venue with a seating capacity near 1,600. Since 1999, the ballpark serves as the home of the Bellingham Bells of the collegiate summer West Coast League.

== Season-by-season record ==
Season	PDC	Division	Finish	Wins	Losses	Win%	Postseason	Manager	Attendance
Bellingham Mariners
1977	SEA	Affiliate	1st	42	26	.618	Defeated Portland in championship series 2–1	Bobby Floyd	36,730
1978	SEA	North	3rd	41	30	.577		Bob Didier	29,739
1979	SEA	North	2nd	41	31	.569		Jeff Scott	31,741
1980	SEA	North	1st	45	25	.643	Tied Eugene 1–1 (Game 3 cancelled due to rain)	Jeff Scott	42,292
1981	SEA	North	1st	39	31	.557	Lost to Medford in championship series 2–0	Jeff Scott	21,390
1982	SEA	North	2nd	33	37	.471		Jeff Scott	17,211
1983	SEA	Washington	1st	40	28	.588	Lost to Medford in championship series 2–0	Jeff Scott	12,944
1984	SEA	Washington	2nd	39	35	.568		Gary Pellant	15,812
1985	SEA	Washington	2nd	39	35	.541		Gary Pellant	18,343
1986	SEA	Washington	1st	45	29	.608	Defeated Eugene in championship series 1–0	Sal Rende	14,916
1987	SEA	South	4th	30	46	.395		Rick Sweet	22,183
1988	SEA	North	4th	25	51	.329		Rick Sweet	15,015
1989	SEA	North	3rd	32	43	.427		Rick Sweet	31,685
1990	SEA	North	3rd	32	44	.421		Rick Sweet	52,461
1991	SEA	North	2nd	37	39	.487		Dave Myers	60,484
1992	SEA	North	1st	43	33	.566	Defeated Bend in championship series 2–0	Dave Myers	68,928
1993	SEA	North	1st	44	32	.579	Lost to Boise in championship series 2–0	Mike Goff	74,900
1994	SEA	North	2nd	42	34	.553		Mike Goff	71,256

Source: Baseball Reference

Division winner	League champions

== Hall of Fame alumni ==
- Ken Griffey Jr. (1987) Inducted, 2016
- Edgar Martinez (1983) Inducted, 2019

== Notable players ==
The following MLB all-stars played for Bellingham:

- Phil Bradley
- Iván Calderón
- Shawn Estes
- Ken Griffey Jr.
- Mike Hampton
- Dave Henderson
- Raúl Ibañez
- Mark Langston
- Derek Lowe
- Edgar Martinez
- Jim Presley
- Dave Stewart
- Omar Vizquel
- Matt Young

== See also ==
- Bellingham Mariners players

Preceded by Bellingham Dodgers	Northwest League franchise 1977-1994	Succeeded by Bellingham Giants
