= Campesinos de Salem-Keizer =

Baseball team in Keizer, Oregon, US

- Logo

Information
- League: Mavericks Independent Baseball League (from 2021)
- Location: Keizer, Oregon
- Ballpark: Volcanoes Stadium (2021–present)
- Founded: 2021
- League championships: 2021

The Campesinos de Salem-Keizer are a baseball team located in Keizer, Oregon, who are charter members of the Mavericks Independent Baseball League, a four-team league entirely based in the Salem Metropolitan Statistical Area and playing all their home games at Volcanoes Stadium.

== History ==
The Salem-Keizer Volcanoes in 2019 were selected by Minor League Baseball as one of 22 teams across the country to join their Copa de la Diversión program beginning with the 2020 season. The team was named the Campesinos de Salem-Keizer. The team was set to debut during Minor League Baseball’s Copa de la Diversion in 2020 before the season was canceled due to the COVID-19 pandemic. The Campesinos (farm laborers) pay tribute to the contributions of farm workers in the Willamette Valley and embrace the culture and values that resonate in the Latino community.

Due to the COVID-19 pandemic, the 2020 Minor League Baseball season was cancelled. Following the cancelled season, Major League Baseball took direct control of Minor League Baseball. The Northwest League was elevated to the High-A classification and contracted to six teams. The Volcanoes were not extended an invitation to continue as a franchise affiliated with a major league organization. The team, however, had plans to continue in some other form, such as collegiate summer baseball or independent baseball, in 2021. And that they did.

On January 26, 2021, the team announced the formation of a new professional independent league called the Mavericks League. It is a four-team league consisting of the Volcanoes and Campesinos de Salem-Keiser (founding members), as well as two returning teams from the past, the Salem Senators (founded in the 1940's) and the Portland Mavericks (founded in the 1970's).
