= Albany Rollers =

- 1904; Albany, Oregon

Minor league affiliations
- Class: Class D (1904)
- League: Oregon State League (1904)

Major league affiliations
- Team: None

Minor league titles
- League titles (0): None

Team data
- Name: Vancouver Soldiers (1904); Albany Rollers (1904)
- Ballpark: Albany Base Ball Park (1904)

The Albany Rollers were a minor league baseball team based in Albany, Oregon. In 1904, the Rollers became members of the Class D level Oregon State League during the season, hosting home games at the Albany Base Ball Park. The Albany Rollers came into existence when the Vancouver Soldiers were forced to relocate to Albany after a territory dispute with the Pacific Coast League.

== History ==
The 1904 Albany Rollers became members of the Class D level Oregon State League after the season had begun. The four–team league began play on April 8, 1904. The charter teams beginning the season were the Eugene Blues, Roseburg Shamrocks, Salem Raglans and Vancouver Soldiers. League salaries were capped at $600.

After their first season began play, the Oregon State League had not officially been admitted to minor league baseball by the National Association governing body. The Oregon State League had not vacated the Vancouver, Washington franchise after the National Association had ruled Vancouver was within the territorial limit of the Portland, Oregon franchise of the Pacific Coast League. To meet the requirement, the Vancouver Soldiers franchise moved to Albany, Oregon on May 18, 1904, and became the "Albany Rollers." Vancouver had a record of 3–8 at the time of the move. Prior to the move, on May 12, 1904, it was reported that E. P. Preble, the owner/manager of Vancouver, had visited Albany and spoke with residents about the possibility of the move. Albany residents, who had earlier supported the prospect of an Albany team in the Oregon State League when the league was formed, began a pledge drive to raise money to support the potential franchise, but were met with some resistance from local businesses before the move to Albany was ultimately made.

The "Rollers" moniker corresponds to the timber industry, which was a strong local industry in the era.

As the Oregon State League continued regular season play, both the Eugene Blues and Roseburg Shamrocks franchises disbanded on July 6, 1904. Travel costs were cited as a reason for folding. The loss of the two franchises caused the Oregon State League, Albany included, to immediately disband.

The Albany Rollers were in third place in the Oregon State League standings when the league permanently folded on July 6, 1904. The Vancouver/Albany team ended the Oregon State League season with an overall record of 17–24, playing under managers Fred Gregory and E.P. Preble. The Vancouver/Albany team finished 9.5 games behind the first place Salem Raglans. In the final standings, Albany finished behind first place Salem (27–13), second place Eugene Blues (22–19) and ahead of the fourth place Roseburg Shamrocks (15–25).

The Oregon State League never reformed as a minor league. Albany, Oregon has not hosted another minor league team.

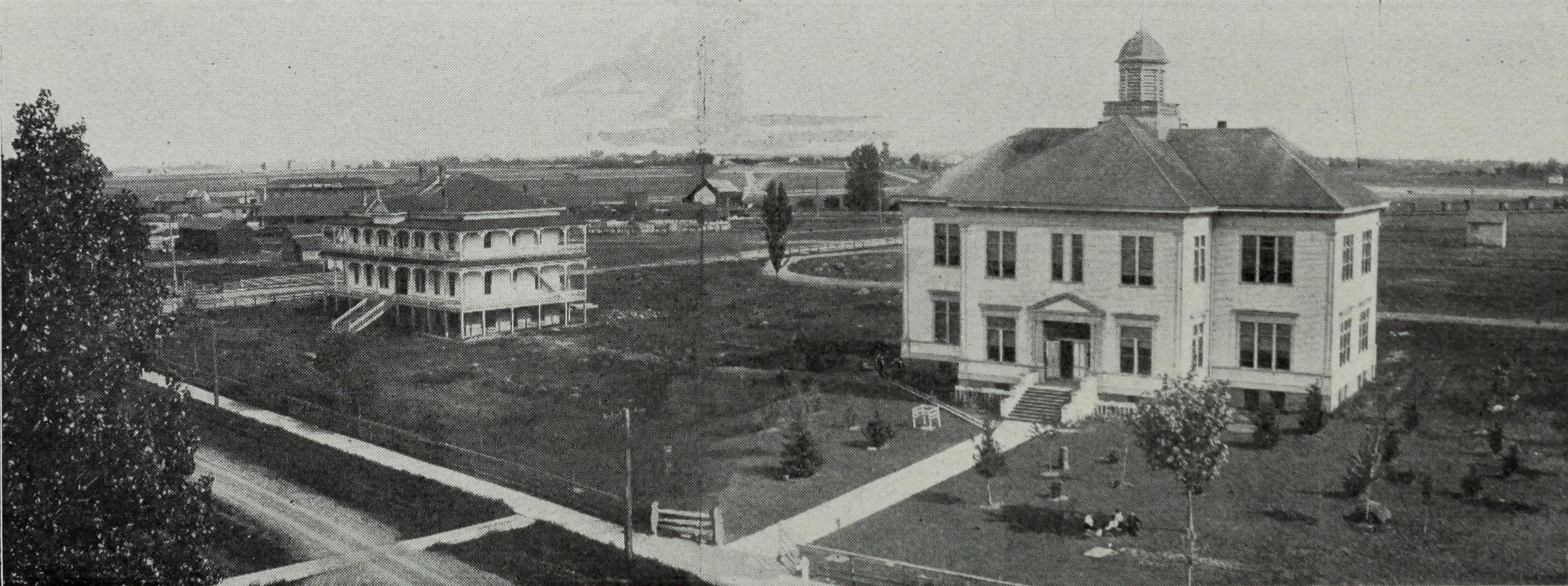
(1901) Albany Collegiate Institute campus

== The ballpark ==
The Albany Rollers hosted minor league home games at the Albany Base Ball Park. In the era, the ballpark was adjacent to the gymnasium on the campus of the Albany Collegiate Institute. After the college relocated, the former campus grounds became the site of the Albany Research Center, operated by the U.S. Department of Energy.

== Timeline ==
Year(s)	# Yrs.	Team	Level	League
1904 (1)	1	Vancouver Soldiers	Class D	Oregon State League
1904 (2)	1	Albany Rollers	Class D	Oregon State League

== Year–by–year record ==
Year	Record	Finish	Manager	Playoffs/Notes
1904	17–24	3rd	Fred Gregory/E.P. Preble	Vancouver (3–8) moved to Albany May 12; League disbanded July 6

== Notable alumni ==
- No Vancouver/Albany players played in the major leagues.
