= Clear Lake, Oregon =

Unincorporated community in the state of Oregon, United States

- Unincorporated community
- Location within Oregon Location within the United States
- Coordinates: 45°02′07″N 123°01′15″W
- Country: United States
- State: Oregon
- County: Marion
- Elevation: 187 ft (57 m)
- Time zone: UTC-8 (Pacific (PST))
  - Summer (DST): UTC-7 (PDT)
- GNIS feature ID: 1119004

Clear Lake is an unincorporated community in Marion County, Oregon, United States, just north of Keizer. It is west and north of Oregon Route 219 and east of Wheatland Road N.

It is likely named for Clear Lake, which is approximately a half-mile west of it. Clear Lake is a disconnected meander of the Willamette River.
