= Oregon State League =

- Classification: Class D (1904)
- Sport: Minor League Baseball
- First season: 1904
- Folded: July 6, 1904
- President: Unknown (1904)
- No. of teams: 4
- Country: United States of America
- Most titles: 1 Salem Raglans (1904)

The Oregon State League was a minor league baseball league that played briefly in the 1904 season. The Class D level Oregon State League featured four teams based in Oregon and Washington. The league permanently folded midway through its first season of play, with the Salem Raglans in first place.

== History ==
The minor league Oregon State League was preceded by semi–pro leagues of the same name.

The Oregon State League was formed for the 1904 season as a Class D level minor league. The Oregon State League began play as a four–team league, hosting franchises from Eugene, Oregon (Eugene Blues), Roseburg, Oregon (Roseburg Shamrocks), Salem, Oregon (Salem Raglans) and Vancouver, Washington (Vancouver Soldiers). (Some sources erroneously have the Vancouver Soldiers being from Vancouver, Canada).

On May 18, 1904, the Vancouver Soldiers, with a 3–8 record, moved from Vancouver, Washington to Albany, Oregon to become the Albany Rollers. The Oregon State League was not admitted to the National Association until it vacated the Vancouver, Washington franchise, which was deemed to be in the territory of the Portland Browns franchise of the Pacific Coast League.

The Oregon State League stopped play on Wednesday, July 6, 1904, when the Eugene and Roseburg franchises both folded. The Oregon State League never returned to minor league play.

== Oregon State League teams ==
Team name	City represented	Ballpark	Year
Albany Rollers	Albany, Oregon	Base Ball Park	1904
Eugene Blues	Eugene, Oregon	Unknown	1904
Roseburg Shamrocks	Roseburg, Oregon	River Front Park	1904
Salem Raglans	Salem, Oregon	Unknown	1904
Vancouver Soldiers	Vancouver, Washington	Recreation Park	1904

== 1904 Oregon State League standings ==
Team standings	W	L	PCT	GB	Managers
Salem Raglans	27	13	.675	-	Jack Fay
Eugene Blues	22	19	.537	5½	Terry McKune / Frank DuShane
Vancouver Soldiers / Albany Rollers	17	24	.415	9½	Fred Gregory / E.P. Preble
Roseburg Shamrocks	15	25	.375	12	Turkey Morrow

== Notable alumni ==
- Heinie Reitz, Eugene Blues
- Hunky Shaw, Roseburg Shamrocks
