= Eugene Blues =

- 1904; Eugene, Oregon

Minor league affiliations
- Class: Class D (1904)
- League: Oregon State League (1904)

Major league affiliations
- Team: None

Minor league titles
- League titles (0): None

Team data
- Name: Eugene Blues (1904)
- Ballpark: Unknown (1904)

The Eugene Blues were a minor league baseball club based in Eugene, Oregon. In 1904, the Blues played as members of the short lived Class D level Oregon State League. The 1904 Blues ended the shortened season in second place. The Blues were succeeded decades later in Eugene by the 1950 Eugene Larks of the Far West League.

== History ==
Eugene began minor league play in 1904, when Oregon State League was formed for the 1904 season as a Class D level minor league. The Oregon State League began play as a four–team league, with the league hosting franchises from Roseburg, Oregon (Roseburg Shamrocks), Salem, Oregon (Salem Raglans) and Vancouver, Washington (Vancouver Soldiers) in addition to Eugene.

The league began play in controversy due to the Vancouver franchise. On May 18, 1904, the Vancouver Soldiers, with a 3–8 record, moved from Vancouver, Washington to Albany, Oregon to become the Albany Rollers. This was because Oregon State League was not going to be admitted to the National Association until it vacated the Vancouver, Washington franchise, which was deemed to be in the territory of the Portland Browns franchise of the Pacific Coast League.

Eugene began the season with a 22–19 record, playing under managers Terry McKune and Frank DuShane. On July 6, 1904, the Eugene Blues franchise folded, with the Roseburg Shamrocks folding at the same time. Reduced to two teams, the Oregon State League immediately stopped play on that date. The Oregon State League never returned to minor league play.

The Eugene Blues ended the 1904 season in second place, finishing 5.5 games behind the first place Salem Raglands in the final standings.

Eugene was without minor league baseball until 1950, when the Eugene Larks began a tenure of play as members of the Class D level Far West League.

== The ballpark ==
The 1904 Blues were noted to have played minor league home games at a site called "The Palms."

== Year-by-year record ==
Year	Record	Finish	Manager	Notes
1904	22–19	2nd	Terry McKune / Frank DuShane	Team and league folded July 6, 1904

== Notable alumni ==
- Heinie Reitz (1904)
- Eugene Blues players
