= Bellingham Dodgers =

- 1973–1976; Bellingham, Washington

Minor league affiliations
- Class: Class A-Short Season
- League: Northwest League

Major league affiliations
- Previous teams: Los Angeles Dodgers

Minor league titles
- Division titles (1): 1974

Team data
- Colors: Dodger blue, white
- Previous parks: Joe Martin Field
- Manager: Bill Berrier

The Bellingham Dodgers were a Minor League Baseball team in the Class A-Short Season Northwest League, based in Bellingham, Washington. The franchise played four season as an affiliate of the Los Angeles Dodgers from 1973 to 1976. In 1977 the team would change names to Bellingham Mariners representative of their new parent club.

== History ==
The franchise arrived in 1973 as the Bellingham Dodgers, affiliated with the Los Angeles Dodgers. After three seasons in Medford and one season in Spokane in 1972, the Dodgers moved their Northwest League affiliate to Bellingham for 1973. In their first season the Dodgers posted a record of 42–37. The Dodgers would build upon their initial success. Bellingham went 52–32 on the year to win the West Division title. In the best of three games league championship series, the Dodgers fell to the Eugene Emeralds.

The team gained unwanted national notoriety in 1975 when it opened the season with 25 straight losses; they finished at 17–61 (.218). The Dodgers would again find themselves at the bottom of the league standings in 1976. Following the season the franchise signed a player development contract with the expansion Seattle Mariners. The Los Angeles Dodgers shifted their short season affiliation to Lethbridge, where they would play as the Lethbridge Dodgers of the Pioneer League.

== Ballpark ==
The Bellingham franchise played at Joe Martin Field, a venue with a seating capacity near 1,600. The park is currently the home of the Bellingham Bells of the West Coast League.

== Season-by-season record ==
Season	PDC	Division	Finish	Wins	Losses	Win%	Postseason	Manager	Attendance
Bellingham Dodgers
1973	LAD	South	2nd	42	37	.638		Bill Berrier	38,396
1974	LAD	West	1st	52	32	.619	Lost to Eugene in championship series 1-2	Bill Berrier	30,350
1975	LAD	North	6th	17	61	.217		Bill Berrier	21,357
1976	LAD	South	6th	30	42	.416		Bill Berrier	23,225

Division winner	League champions

=== See also ===
- Bellingham Dodgers players (1973–1976)

Preceded by Expansion franchise	Northwest League franchise 1973-1976	Succeeded by Bellingham Mariners
