= Salem–Keizer Volcanoes =

- Founded in 1997; Keizer, Oregon
Team logo
Cap insignia

Minor league affiliations
- Class: Independent (from 2021)
- Previous classes: Class A Short Season (1997–2020)
- League: Mavericks Independent Baseball League (from 2021)
- Previous leagues: Northwest League (1997–2020)

Major league affiliations
- Previous teams: San Francisco Giants (1997–2020)

Minor league titles
- League titles (8): 1998; 2001; 2006; 2007; 2009; 2024; 2025; 2026
- Division titles (7): 1998; 2001; 2003; 2006; 2007; 2008; 2009

Team data
- Name: Salem–Keizer Volcanoes (1997–present)
- Colors: Gray, lava red, obsidian, burnt gold, white
- Mascot: Crater
- Ballpark: Volcanoes Stadium (1997–present)
- Owner/ Operator: Jerry Walker
- Manager: Tony Torcato

The Salem–Keizer Volcanoes are a baseball team located in Keizer, Oregon, who are charter members of the Mavericks Independent Baseball League, a four-team league entirely based in the Salem Metropolitan Statistical Area and playing all their home games at Volcanoes Stadium. From 1997 to 2020, they were members of Minor League Baseball's Northwest League as the Class A Short Season affiliate of the San Francisco Giants. With the reorganization of baseball after the 2020 season, the Volcanoes were not offered a player development license with any Major League Baseball club, though the Volcanoes promised to continue play in 2021, a promise they kept in forming the Mavericks League.

== History ==
The Volcanoes history begins in Bellingham, Washington where the franchise played for eighteen season as an affiliate of the Seattle Mariners. In 1994, Seattle shifted their affiliation to Everett, who had been a long time San Francisco Giants farm club. Bellingham swapped parents with Everett and adopted their parent club's name to become the Bellingham Giants. Bellingham had long struggled with attendance and its facility failed to meet league standards. Efforts to secure funding for facility improvements in Bellingham were unsuccessful. In 1996, Bellingham Giants co-owners Jerry Walker and William Tucker announced that they were moving the franchise to Keizer, Oregon, a city of 22,000 people located immediately north of Salem.

Keizer had striven to assert itself as an independent, thriving city for 12 years since the former Salem suburb had become an incorporated municipality. City officials, led by Mayor Dennis Koho, and civic leaders worked toward getting a new baseball stadium located and built in Keizer. The area had lacked a suitable facility for pro baseball since the early 1960s, when the Salem Dodgers vacated historic Waters Field (which burned down in 1966).

Area fans chose the nickname "Volcanoes" in a contest. The new franchise was designated as a "Salem–Keizer" team, despite its location, in order to incorporate both the history and the prestige of the larger city and state capital. The Volcanoes continued their player development contract with the San Francisco Giants, a relationship that continued through 2020.

In their inaugural season of 1997, the Volcanoes posted a record of 40–36 and finished third in the south division standings. The 1998 season was a banner year for Salem–Keizer. The Volcanoes finished the year at 43–33, tied with the Southern Oregon Timberjacks. In a one-game play-off the Volcanoes bested the Timberjacks to earn the south division title. Salem–Keizer defeated the Boise Hawks in the best-of-three series en route to a Northwest League championship.

In 2001, the Volcanoes won the south division title. The team went on to sweep the Boise Hawks in the championship series to claim their second Northwest League crown. The Volcanoes won the Freitas Award as the best short-season Class A baseball franchise. The Volcanoes celebrated their 10th season in Salem–Keizer by ending the regular season with a league record 55 victories, a league record. The team set franchise records of most consecutive games won with 12 and most runs in an inning (10), in the seventh inning of a 19–3 rout of the Canadians on August 30. In that game, catcher Adam Witter hitting the team's first ever cycle. The Volcanoes capped the 2006 season by defeating the Boise Hawks, three games to one, winning the league championship. Salem-Keizer broke their own record for wins in a season, finishing the season with a 57–19 mark, a .750 overall record; the best in baseball that year. They won their second consecutive championship in a row by defeating the Tri-City Dust Devils, three games to one. The team was honored with the Best Short-Season and Best Overall Team in the 2007 Minor League Baseball Awards.

The Volcanoes finished 2008 with third consecutive west division title. In an effort to three-peat as Northwest League champions, the team came up short a dropped the championship series to the Spokane Indians. Salem–Keizer posted a 49–27 record to win its fifth straight division title. Led by a pitching staff that recorded a 0.69 ERA over the four-game set, the Volcanoes defeated the Tri-City Dust Devils to with the league championship. In the first decade of the new millennium the Volcanoes made an unprecedented six postseason appearances, winning four Northwest League championships.

In 2013, the Volcanoes won the south division title, but lost to Boise in the division series. After a five-year drought, Salem–Keizer returned to the postseason in 2019 by winning the first half south division. The Volcanoes were defeated in the division series by the eventual league champion Hillsboro Hops.

Due to the COVID-19 pandemic, the 2020 Minor League Baseball season was cancelled. Following the cancelled season, Major League Baseball took direct control of Minor League Baseball. The Northwest League was elevated to the High-A classification and contracted to six teams. The Volcanoes were not extended an invitation to continue as a franchise affiliated with a major league organization. The team, however, has plans to continue in some other form, such as collegiate summer baseball or independent baseball, in 2021. The team was one of 22 teams slated to join the MILB "Copa de Diversion" in 2020, playing under the identity "Campesinos de Salem–Keizer."

On January 26, 2021, the team announced the formation of a new professional independent league called the Mavericks League. It is a four-team league consisting of the Volcanoes and Campesinos de Salem-Keiser (founding members), as well as two returning teams from the past, the Salem Senators (founded in the 1940s) and the Portland Mavericks (founded in the 1970s).

== Ballpark ==
The Volcanoes play at Volcanoes Stadium located in Keizer, Oregon. The facility was built in less than a year, in time for the debut of the Volcanoes, on a tract of land adjacent to Interstate 5 just northwest of the Keizer interchange. The stadium seats 4,252. In 1999, the American Institute of Architects honored the Volcanoes with a design award for the stadium.

Volcanoes Stadium also hosts all five of Oregon's state high school baseball championship games. In 1998, the University of Oregon football team played its spring Green-White game in the stadium in early May.

== Baseball in the Salem Area ==
The Salem–Keizer area has been home to professional baseball since 1940, when the Salem Senators (an homage to Salem's role as Oregon's capital) were formed as a member of the Western International League (WIL). When the WIL reformed into the current Northwest League (NWL) in 1955, the Senators were a charter member of the new circuit. The Salem franchise played as the Senators until 1960, when it became a Class A affiliate of the Los Angeles Dodgers and adopted the parent club's nickname. The Salem Dodgers continued to play until the 1965 season, after which the franchise was dormant for 17 years.

In 1977, former Stockton Ports owner/manager Carl Thompson purchased the Salem franchise and put it back on the field as an NWL member and Dodgers farm club. The revived Senators played until after the 1981 season, when the California Angels became the team's parent club.

The 1982 Angels captured the first NWL championship by a Salem-area franchise, and became the first NWL champion with a losing regular-season record, a distinction which lasted until 2005.

The Salem Angels shifted their major-league affiliation and nickname back to the Dodgers after the 1987 season. The Dodgers played in Salem for two seasons, with future major-league star Mike Piazza on the team's 1989 roster.

In 1990, owners moved the Salem Dodgers to Yakima, Washington, mainly due to lack of adequate facilities. The Salem club had played its home games at the Chemeketa Community College field, which lacked a grandstand, permanent concession stands and other amenities. It would be seven years before pro baseball returned to the Salem-Keizer metropolitan area.

As of 2025, the region will be host of the West Coast League's 17th franchise, the Marion Berries.

== Season-by-season record ==
Season	PDC	Division	Finish	Wins	Losses	Win%	Postseason	Manager	Attendance
Salem–Keizer Volcanoes
1997	SFG	South	3rd	40	36	.526		Shane Turner	136,836
1998	SFG	South	1st	43	33	.566	Defeated Southern Oregon in division play-off 1-0; Defeated Boise in championship series 2-0	Keith Comstock	133,980
1999	SFG	South	3rd	37	39	.487		Frank Reberger	124,627
2000	SFG	West	3rd	36	40	.474		Fred Stanley	125,409
2001	SFG	West	1st	51	25	.671	Defeated Boise in championship series 3-0	Fred Stanley	115,340
2002	SFG	West	3rd	41	35	.539		Fred Stanley	122,334
2003	SFG	West	1st	43	33	.566	Lost to Spokane in championship series 3-0	Joe Strain	119,556
2004	SFG	West	3rd	37	39	.487		Joe Strain	118,929
2005	SFG	West	2nd	45	31	.592		Steve Decker	108,418
2006	SFG	West	1st	55	21	.724	Defeated Boise in championship series 3-1	Steve Deceker	118,622
2007	SFG	West	1st	57	19	.750	Defeated Tri-City in championship series 3-1	Steve Decker	118,722
2008	SFG	West	1st	40	36	.526	Lost to Spokane in championship series 3-1	Tom Trebelhorn	112,425
2009	SFG	West	1st	49	27	.645	Defeated Tri-City in championship series 3-1	Tom Trebelhorn	106,590
2010	SFG	West	4th	31	45	.408		Tom Trebelhorn	96,219
2011	SFG	West	4th	34	42	.474		Tom Trebelhorn	105,973
2012	SFG	West	4th	32	44	.421		Tom Trebelhorn	101,785
2013	SFG	South	1st	47	29	.618	Lost to Boise in division series 2-0	Tom Trebelhorn	98,024
2014	SFG	South	3rd	38	38	.500		Gary Davenport	95,083
2015	SFG	South	4th	39	37	.513		Kyle Haines	85,851
2016	SFG	South	4th	32	42	.432		Kyle Haines	80,469
2017	SFG	South	4th	29	47	.382		Jolbert Cabrera	81,011
2018	SFG	South	2nd	36	40	.474		Hector Borg	72,094
2019	SFG	South	2nd	46	30	.605	Lost to Hillsboro in division series 0-2	Mark Hallberg	80,833

Division winner	League champions

== Notable alumni ==
- Joe Biagini, MLB Relief Pitcher
- Hunter Bishop, Minors Outfielder, first round draft pick
- Emmanuel Burriss, MLB/Minors Second Baseman
- Kervin Castro (born 1999), pitcher
- Brandon Crawford, MLB Shortstop
- Steven Duggar (born 1993), MLB outfielder
- Kevin Frandsen, MLB Second Baseman
- Conor Gillaspie, MLB Third Baseman
- Brian Horwitz, MLB Outfielder
- Joe Nathan, MLB Relief Pitcher
- Travis Ishikawa, MLB First Baseman
- Noah Lowry, MLB Starting Pitcher
- Tim Lincecum, MLB Starting Pitcher
- Joe Panik, MLB Second Baseman
- Buster Posey, MLB Catcher
- Ryan Vogelsong, MLB Starting Pitcher
- Pablo Sandoval, MLB Third Baseman
- Kurt Ainsworth, MLB Starting Pitcher
- Jesse Foppert, MLB Starting Pitcher
- Sergio Romo, MLB Relief Pitcher
- Dan Runzler, MLB Relief Pitcher
- Jonathan Sánchez, MLB Starting Pitcher
- Nate Schierholtz, MLB Outfielder
- Keaton Winn, MLB Pitcher
- Lance Niekro, MLB First Baseman

Since 1997, 84 former Volcanoes have played in the major leagues. Two former Volcanoes also played in the inaugural 2006 World Baseball Classic: Joe Nathan (U.S.) and Jonathan Sánchez (Puerto Rico).

Preceded by Bellingham Giants	Northwest League franchise 1997–2020	Succeeded by Contracted
