= Mavericks Independent Baseball League =

Independent baseball league

- Sport: Baseball
- Founded: 2021
- First season: 2021
- Owner: Mickey Walker
- CEO: Mickey Walker
- Commissioner: Jerry Howard
- No. of teams: 4
- Country: United States
- Venues: Roto-Rooter Park; Keizer, Oregon
- Continent: North America
- Most recent champion: Salem-Keizer Volcanoes (2026)
- Website: mavericksindependentleague.com

The Mavericks Independent Baseball League is an independent baseball league based in Keizer, Oregon, founded in 2021. Each team in the Mavericks League plays a 48-game regular season schedule from May through August, with a championship series at the conclusion of the regular season. All of the league's games are played at Roto-Rooter Park in Keizer.

== History ==
After the 2020-21 Minor League Baseball reorganization left the Salem-Keizer Volcanoes (hitherto members of the Northwest League as the San Francisco Giants' A Short-Season affiliate) without an affiliation, the Volcanoes resolved that they would play in 2021 nonetheless, with further information to come. On January 26, 2021, it was announced that the Volcanoes ownership would be forming their own independent baseball league, the Mavericks League.

The league has four teams based in the Salem Metropolitan Statistical Area, with all games being played at Volcanoes Stadium in Keizer, Oregon. It is aimed at top-level undrafted and released players, as well as high-level collegiate and former Volcanoes players seeking to rejoin the MLB affiliated minor league ranks. Players are not paid.

In addition to the Volcanoes, the league will feature the Campesinos de Salem-Keizer (previously the Volcanoes' Copa de la Diversión alter-ego) as well as the revival of the Portland Mavericks (an infamous independent Northwest League team which played from 1973 to 1977) and the Salem Senators (a name used by numerous Northwest League teams based in Salem throughout the 20th century).

== Teams ==
Team	City	Stadium	Capacity
Portland Mavericks	Keizer, Oregon	Roto-Rooter Park	4,254
Salem Senators	Keizer, Oregon	Roto-Rooter Park	4,254
Campesinos de Salem-Keizer	Keizer, Oregon	Roto-Rooter Park	4,254
Salem-Keizer Volcanoes	Keizer, Oregon	Roto-Rooter Park	4,254

== Champions ==
Season	Winner
2021	Campesinos de Salem-Keizer
2022	Salem Senators
2023	Salem Senators
2024	Salem-Keizer Volcanoes
2025	Salem-Keizer Volcanoes
2026	Salem-Keizer Volcanoes
