= Hunky Shaw =

American baseball player (1884–1969)

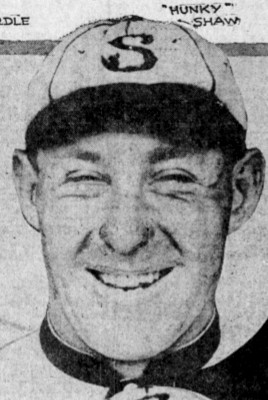
- Pinch-hitter
- Born: September 29, 1884; Yakima, Washington
- Died: July 3, 1969 (aged 84); Yakima, Washington
- Batted: Both Threw: Right

MLB debut
- May 16, 1908, for the Pittsburgh Pirates

Last MLB appearance
- May 16, 1908, for the Pittsburgh Pirates

MLB statistics
- Games: 1
- At bats: 1
- Hits: 0

Teams
- Pittsburgh Pirates (1908)

Royal N. "Hunky" Shaw (September 29, 1884 – July 3, 1969) was a Major League Baseball pinch-hitter. Shaw played for the Pittsburgh Pirates in 1908. In 1 career game, he had 0 hits in 1 at-bat. He batted and threw right-handed.

Shaw was born and died in Yakima, Washington. He attended the University of Washington, where he played college baseball for the Huskies in 1905.

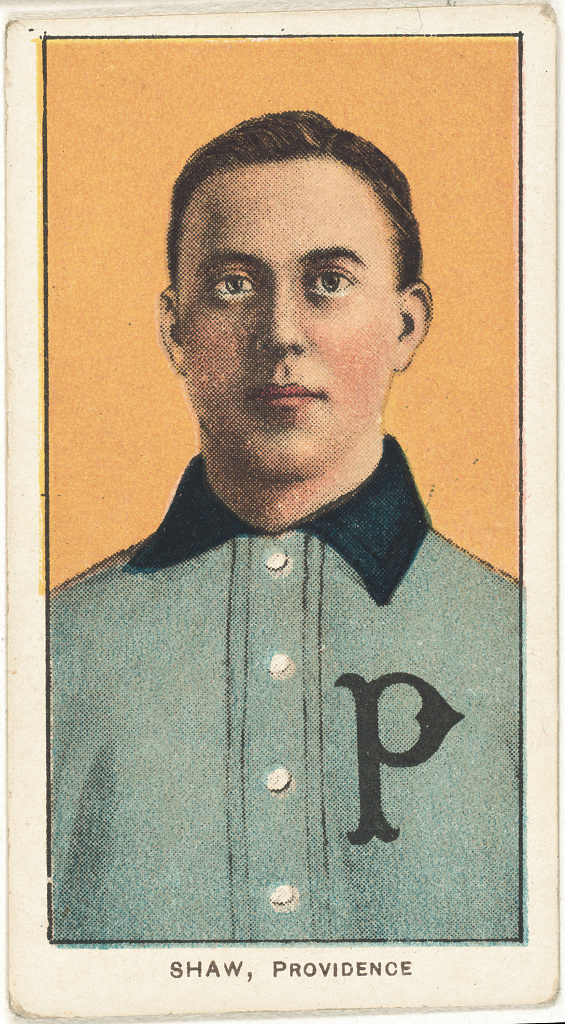
