= Keizer, Oregon =

- City
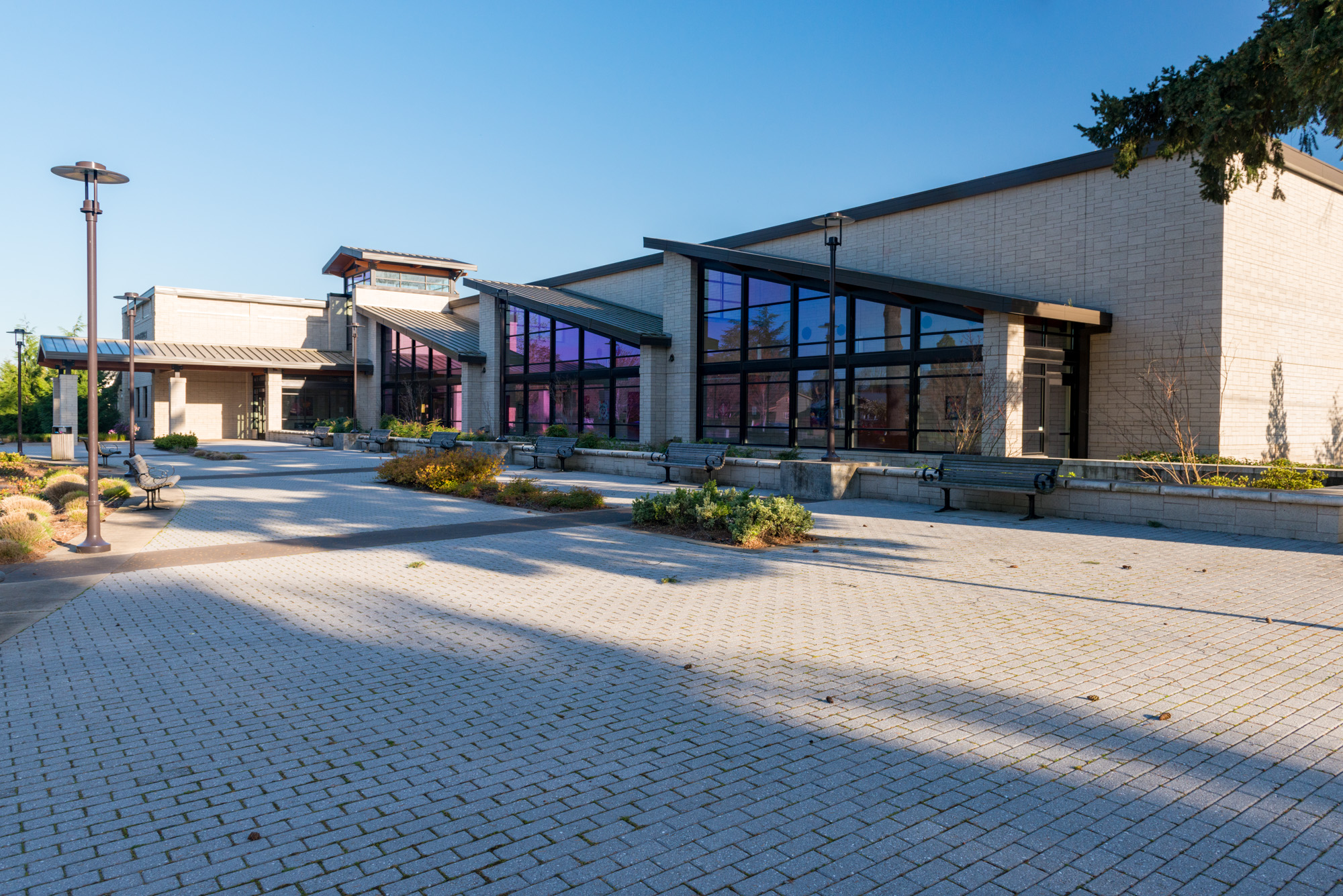
- Keizer City Hall

- Location in Marion County, Oregon
- Coordinates: 45°00′10″N 123°01′28″W
- Country: United States
- State: Oregon
- County: Marion
- Incorporated: 1982

Government
  - Mayor: Cathy Clark

Area
  - Total: 7.30 sq mi (18.91 km^{2})
  - Land: 7.19 sq mi (18.61 km^{2})
  - Water: 0.12 sq mi (0.30 km^{2})
- Elevation: 128 ft (39 m)

Population (2020)
  - Total: 39,376
  - Density: 5,480.2/sq mi (2,115.91/km^{2})
- Time zone: UTC-8 (Pacific)
  - Summer (DST): UTC-7 (Pacific)
- ZIP Codes: 97303, 97307
- Area code: 503
- FIPS code: 41-38500
- GNIS feature ID: 2410171
- Website: www.keizeror.gov

Keizer (/ˈkaɪzər/) is a city in Marion County, Oregon, United States, along the 45th parallel. As of the 2020 United States census, its population was 39,376, making it the 14th most populous city in Oregon. It lies in the Willamette Valley and is part of the Salem Metropolitan Statistical Area. It was named after pioneer Thomas Dove (T. D.) Keizur and his family, who arrived in the Wagon Train of 1843, and later filed donation land claims.

== History ==
The original settlement was at Keizer Bottom, near the banks of the Willamette River. The community was named after Thomas Dove Keizur, one of its first settlers. Somewhere in the translation of donation land claim records, his name was misspelled. The settlement suffered in the flood of 1861, and the inhabitants rebuilt their homes on higher ground. Further floods in 1943, 1945, 1946 and 1948 hampered the growth of the community, and it was not until dams were built in the 1950s to regulate the flow of the Willamette that Keizer began to flourish.

The city of Salem tried to annex the growing community adjacent to its limits many times. Beginning in 1964, a number of Keizer residents, powered by Janet and Richard Bauer and family, tried to convince the people of Keizer that it would be cheaper and better to form their own city. It was not until November 2, 1982, that, with the support of the nearby unincorporated community of Clear Lake, residents voted to make Keizer a city.

== Geography ==
Keizer is in western Marion County and is bordered to the south and east by Salem, the state capital. Its southwestern border is the Willamette River, which also serves as the boundary with Polk County. Keizer is 3 miles (5 km) north of downtown Salem and 43 miles (69 km) south of Portland. State Route Oregon Route 99E parallels the southeastern border of Keizer just outside the city limits, while Interstate 5 follows the northeastern border, with access from Exit 260A (Chemawa Road Northeast).

According to the U.S. Census Bureau, Keizer has a total area of 7.30 square miles (18.91 km^{2}), of which 7.19 square miles (18.62 km^{2}) are land and 0.12 square miles (0.31 km^{2}), or 1.59%, are water.

== Demographics ==
Historical population
Census	Pop.	Note	%±
1960	5,288		—
1970	11,292		113.5%
1980	18,592		64.6%
1990	21,884		17.7%
2000	32,203		47.2%
2010	36,478		13.3%
2020	39,376		7.9%
2024 (est.)	39,152		−0.6%

=== 2020 census ===
As of the 2020 census, Keizer had a population of 39,376. The median age was 38.0 years. 24.1% of residents were under the age of 18 and 18.4% of residents were 65 years of age or older. For every 100 females there were 93.0 males, and for every 100 females age 18 and over there were 89.4 males age 18 and over.

100.0% of residents lived in urban areas, while 0% lived in rural areas.

There were 14,706 households in Keizer, of which 32.9% had children under the age of 18 living in them. Of all households, 50.3% were married-couple households, 14.7% were households with a male householder and no spouse or partner present, and 27.2% were households with a female householder and no spouse or partner present. About 23.6% of all households were made up of individuals and 12.1% had someone living alone who was 65 years of age or older.

There were 15,277 housing units, of which 3.7% were vacant. Among occupied housing units, 60.6% were owner-occupied and 39.4% were renter-occupied. The homeowner vacancy rate was 1.0% and the rental vacancy rate was 5.1%.

Racial composition as of the 2020 census
Race	Number	Percent
White	28,520	72.4%
Black or African American	409	1.0%
American Indian and Alaska Native	636	1.6%
Asian	809	2.1%
Native Hawaiian and Other Pacific Islander	399	1.0%
Some other race	3,744	9.5%
Two or more races	4,859	12.3%
Hispanic or Latino (of any race)	8,644	22.0%

=== 2010 census ===
As of the census of 2010, there were 36,478 people, 13,703 households, and 9,498 families living in the city. The population density was 5,145.0 inhabitants per square mile (1,986.5/km^{2}). There were 14,445 housing units at an average density of 2,037.4 per square mile (786.6/km^{2}). The racial makeup of the city was 82.5% White, 0.8% African American, 1.3% Native American, 1.6% Asian, 0.6% Pacific Islander, 9.0% from other races, and 4.1% from two or more races. Hispanic or Latino of any race were 18.3% of the population.

There were 13,703 households, of which 36.9% had children under the age of 18 living with them, 51.0% were married couples living together, 13.3% had a female householder with no husband present, 5.0% had a male householder with no wife present, and 30.7% were non-families. 24.2% of all households were made up of individuals, and 10.3% had someone living alone who was 65 years of age or older. The average household size was 2.64 and the average family size was 3.13.

The median age in the city was 35.7 years. 27.3% of residents were under the age of 18; 8.1% were between the ages of 18 and 24; 26.6% were from 25 to 44; 24.7% were from 45 to 64; and 13.3% were 65 years of age or older. The gender makeup of the city was 48.0% male and 52.0% female.

=== 2000 census ===
As of the census of 2000, there were 32,203 people, 12,110 households, and 8,646 families living in the city. The population density was 4,455.7 people per square mile (1,720.4 people/km^{2}). There were 12,774 housing units at an average density of 1,767.4 per square mile (682.4/km^{2}). The racial makeup of the city was 85.52% White, 0.75% African American, 1.38% Native American, 1.49% Asian, 0.20% Pacific Islander, 7.22% from other races, and 3.44% from two or more races. Hispanic or Latino of any race were 12.27% of the population.

There were 12,110 households, out of which 35.6% had children under the age of 18 living with them, 55.8% were married couples living together, 11.2% had a female householder with no husband present, and 28.6% were non-families. 22.4% of all households were made up of individuals, and 8.4% had someone living alone who was 65 years of age or older. The average household size was 2.64 and the average family size was 3.07. In the city, the population was 27.7% under the age of 18, 8.2% from 18 to 24, 30.1% from 25 to 44, 21.9% from 45 to 64, and 12.2% who were 65 years of age or older. The median age was 34 years. For every 100 females, there were 94.3 males. For every 100 females age 18 and over, there were 91.2 males. The median income for a household in the city was $45,052, and the median income for a family was $49,977. Males had a median income of $37,138 versus $27,032 for females. The per capita income for the city was $20,119. About 6.2% of families and 9.3% of the population were below the poverty line, including 11.7% of those under age 18 and 7.6% of those age 65 or over.

== Arts and culture ==
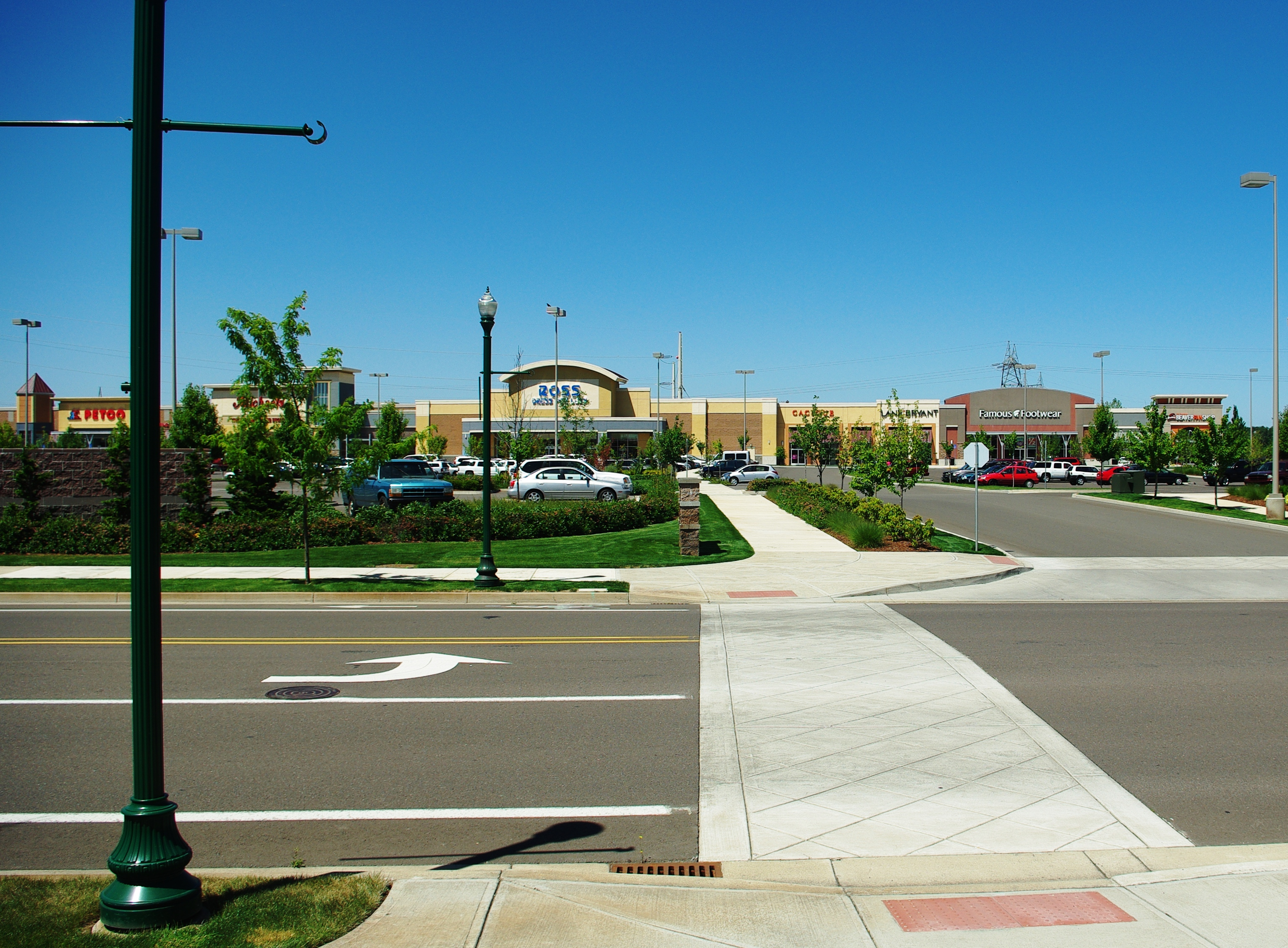
Keizer Station shopping center

=== Annual cultural events ===
The annual KeizerFEST, formally known as the Iris Festival, takes place in May and showcases Keizer's iris-growing industry. The festival was founded by Schreiner's Iris Gardens, one of the country's largest retail iris growers, and has been facilitated by the Keizer Chamber of Commerce since 1987. Events include a carnival, a beer garden, craft and food vendors, a 5k walk/run, a vintage car show, and a parade.

=== Museums and other points of interest ===
The Keizer Heritage Museum is inside the Keizer Heritage Community Center, which was formerly the Keizer School. The school, built in 1916, has been completely restored and is the only public historic building in Keizer. Other tenants of the building include the Keizer Community Library, the Keizer Art Association and gallery, and the Keizer Chamber of Commerce.

== Sports ==
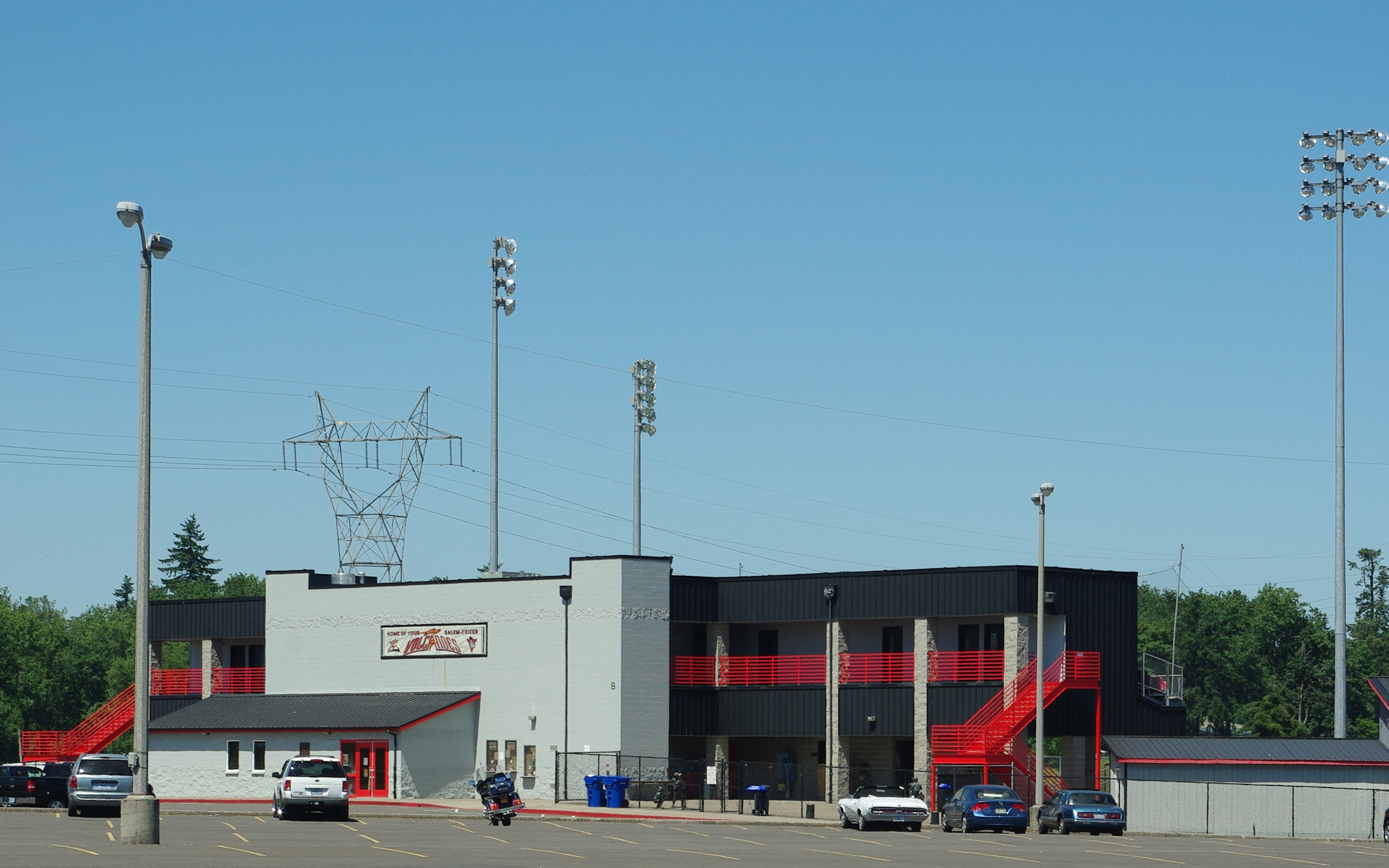
Volcanoes Stadium

The Salem-Keizer Volcanoes, a single A short season minor league baseball team in the Mavericks Independent Baseball League, play at Volcanoes Stadium in Keizer. In addition to minor league baseball, Volcanoes Stadium has hosted the OSAA baseball championship and a Civil War baseball game between the University of Oregon Ducks and Oregon State University Beavers.

== Education ==
Keizer is part of the Salem-Keizer School District and has one high school: McNary; two middle schools: Claggett Creek and Whiteaker; and seven elementary schools: Clear Lake, Cummings, Forest Ridge, Gubser, Keizer, Kennedy and Weddle.

The first schoolhouse in the Keizer area was built in 1878, and its first teacher was Nina McNary, older sister of U.S. Senator Charles L. McNary. The first school was torn down in 1915 and replaced in 1916 with the building that now serves as the Keizer Heritage Community Center. By the 1980s, the 1916 Keizer Elementary School was judged unsafe and a new school was built in 1987. Cummings School was built in 1953 to serve the area's growing population. In 1955, Keizer School District #88 and Salem School District # 24CJ merged to form the Salem Keizer School District.

== Media ==
- Keizertimes – weekly newspaper

== Notable people ==
- Vic Backlund (born 1936), state legislator for Keizer and high school coach
- Grayson Boucher (born 1984), streetball player for the AND1 Mixtape Tour
- Deen Castronovo (born 1964), drummer for Ozzy Osbourne and Journey
- Daniel R. Hokanson, lieutenant general in the U.S. Army
- Charles L. McNary, U.S. senator from 1917 to 1944

== Sister cities ==
Keizer has a sister city relationship with Iyo, Japan (2025).
