= Salem Senators =

- 1940; (1940–1942, 1946–1965; 1977–1989; 2021–present); Salem, Oregon

Minor league affiliations
- Class: Independent (2021–present)
- Previous classes: Class-A (1963–1965, 1977–1989); Class-B (1955–1962); Class A (1952–1954); Class B (1940–1942, 1946–1951)
- League: Mavericks Independent Baseball League (2021–present)
- Previous leagues: Northwest League (1955–1965, 1977–1989); Western International League (1940–1942, 1946–1954)

Major league affiliations
- Previous teams: Los Angeles Dodgers (1988–1989); California Angels (1981–1987); Los Angeles Dodgers (1961–1965); Philadelphia Phillies (1954)

Minor league titles
- League titles: 3 (1982), (2022), (2023)

Team data
- Previous names: Salem Dodgers (1988–1989); Salem Angels (1982–1987); Salem Senators (1977–1981); Salem Dodgers (1961–1965); Salem Senators (1940–1942, 1946–1960)
- Previous parks: Chemeketa Community College baseball field; Waters Field

The Salem Senators are the longest lasting name used by several minor league baseball teams based in Salem in the U.S. state of Oregon. The team name derived from Salem being the capital of Oregon. The team was founded in 1940. The current incarnation competes in the Mavericks Independent Baseball League.

== History ==
Waters Field in 1945

The Senators were preceded in Salem by the Salem Raglans, who played the 1904 season in the Class D Oregon State League, claiming the championship when the Oregon State League permanently folded during the season. Salem finished with a 27–13 record, 5.5 games ahead of the second place Eugene Blues in the four–team league. The Raglans played their games at the Capital Amateur Athletic Club (C.A.A.C.) Park, which was on the north side of Asylum Avenue (now Center Street NE) near the Asylum (now Oregon State Hospital).[Oregon City Directory, 1905]

On May 1, 1940, the first Senators' game was played at the new 5,000 seat Waters Field, which was also the first professional baseball game in the city. George E. Waters had bought the Class B Bellingham Chinooks franchise from the Western International League and relocated them from Bellingham, Washington, and then built the ballpark for $60,000. It was on the east side of 25th Street SE (bordering the third base line), about a block's length north of the angling Turner Road (later Mission St NE - roughly paralleling the first base line). (If Helms Street were extended east, it would have bordered the first base line.)

A crowd of 4,865 showed up for the first game against the Yakima Pippins, which at the time was the largest sports crowd for an event in Salem. Waters died after the season, and in 1942 his widow sold the team to the Portland Beavers, who used it as a farm team. At the time, the Beavers were in the Pacific Coast League, a near-major league level league. During the 1942 season, player and business manager Al Lightner attempted to sign a convicted murderer serving time at the Oregon State Penitentiary to pitch a game, but Minor League Baseball threatened to ban Lightner if the convict played in the game.

The team went on hiatus from 1943 to 1945 because of World War II. After the war, attorney Don Young helped raise $50,000 to buy the team and stadium from the Beavers in 1951.

In 1961, the team was renamed the Dodgers after becoming a farm team for the Los Angeles Dodgers. Players on the Dodgers' teams included future managers Bobby Cox and Jim Lefebvre.

The Salem team ceased operations in 1966, at which time it was still a Class B team. On November 11, 1966, the already-condemned and mostly-wooden Waters Field burned down. A US Post Office and its parking lot stand on the site now.

=== Reincarnation ===
In 1977, the Salem Senators returned as an independent team in the Class A Northwest League. They lost their first game on June 17 to the Portland Mavericks 9–8. Home games were at Holland Youth Park and then Chemeketa Community College. Founder and owner Carl Thompson was forced to sell the team in August 1978 to a group led by Ben Yates. After the 1981 season, team president Clint Holland signed a development agreement with the California Angels, and the Senators became the Salem Angels for the 1982 season.

=== Salem Angels ===
==== 1982 season ====
The Salem Angels' first season was both a disappointment and a success. They finished with a mediocre record of 34 wins and 36 losses, but their performance was good enough to lead the Northwest League's Northern Division. The playoffs provided the team's success, as the Angels won the league championship.

Team manager, Joe Maddon, who would go on to manage the Los Angeles Angels of the American League, won the Northwest League's Manager of the year award. The team's future Major league Baseball players include second baseman Mark McLemore, and four of their starting pitchers. These pitchers are Kirk McCaskill, who easily had the most extensive career of the four, Bob Kipper, Urbano Lugo, and Tony Mack.

==== 1983 season ====
Returning manager Maddon and his Angels team's regular season record did not improve. Their 31–39 win–loss record was only good enough for fourth in the league's Oregon division, and they did not qualify for the playoffs. Future Major Leaguers on this club were 3B/2B Jack Howell, and starter Ray Chadwick.

==== 1984 season ====
Maddon moved onto Peoria for the 1984 season, and the managing duties were given to Larry Patterson. The team finished with its third consecutive losing season, with a 35-39 record, and finished third in the Oregon division. Future Major Leaguers from this team include OF/1B Dante Bichette, who went on to a long and successful career with the Angels and the Colorado Rockies, OF Doug Jennings, Catcher Erik Pappas, 2B Pete Coachman, OF Brian Brady, and pitcher Sherman Corbett.

==== 1985 season ====
For the 1985 season, manager Patterson was replaced with Bruce Hines, and the Angels finished with its first winning season, with a 39-35 record, which was still only good enough to rank them third in the Oregon division, and the team did not qualify for the playoffs. Future Major leaguers include relief pitcher Chuck Finley, who went on to a long and successful career as a starting pitcher, SS Bobby Rose, and RP Frank Dimichele.

==== 1986 season ====
Manager Hines returned for a second season, and again, he led his team to winning record (38-36), but they again finished third in the Oregon division and did not qualify for the playoffs. Future Major Leaguers include OF Lee Stevens, pitchers Alan Mills, Mike Fetters, Roberto Hernández, and Colby Ward.

==== 1987 season ====
Manager Hines departed, and his duties were given to Chris Smith. The team finished third in the Western division with a 34-41 record. It was to be the team's last season in the Northwest League, and future Major Leaguers include OF/3B Rubén Amaro, Jr., C John Orton, and P Gary Buckels.

=== Later years ===
The franchise became the Dodgers again in 1988 and moved to Yakima, Washington in 1990 to become the Yakima Bears. The team returned to Oregon following the 2012 season as the Hops in Hillsboro. The Salem-Keizer Volcanoes later represented the Salem area in MiLB from 1997-2020.

== 2021 return ==
After Salem Again lost a MiLB team, in 2021, the Salem-Keizer Volcanoes ownership launched the four-team Mavericks Independent Baseball League at Volcanoes Stadium and revived the Senators name for one of the teams.

== Notable Salem Alumni ==
Baseball Hall of Fame alumni

- Bobby Cox (1961-1962) Inducted, 2014
- Mike Piazza (1989) Inducted, 2016

Notable alumni

- Dante Bichette (1984) 4x MLB All-Star
- Mike Fetters (1986)
- Chuck Finley (1985) 5x MLB All-Star
- Roberto Hernandez (1986) 2x MLB All-Star
- Jim Lefebvre (1963) MLB All-Star; 1965 NL Rookie of the Year
- Frank Lucchesi (1946)
- Kirk McCaskill (1982)
- Joe Maddon (1982-1983, MGR) 3x MLB Manager of the Year; Manager, 2016 World Series Champion - Chicago Cubs
- Henry Rodriguez (1988) MLB All-Star
- Lee Stevens (1986)

== See also ==
- Salem Senators players
