= Class A Short Season =

Defunct level of competition in Minor League Baseball

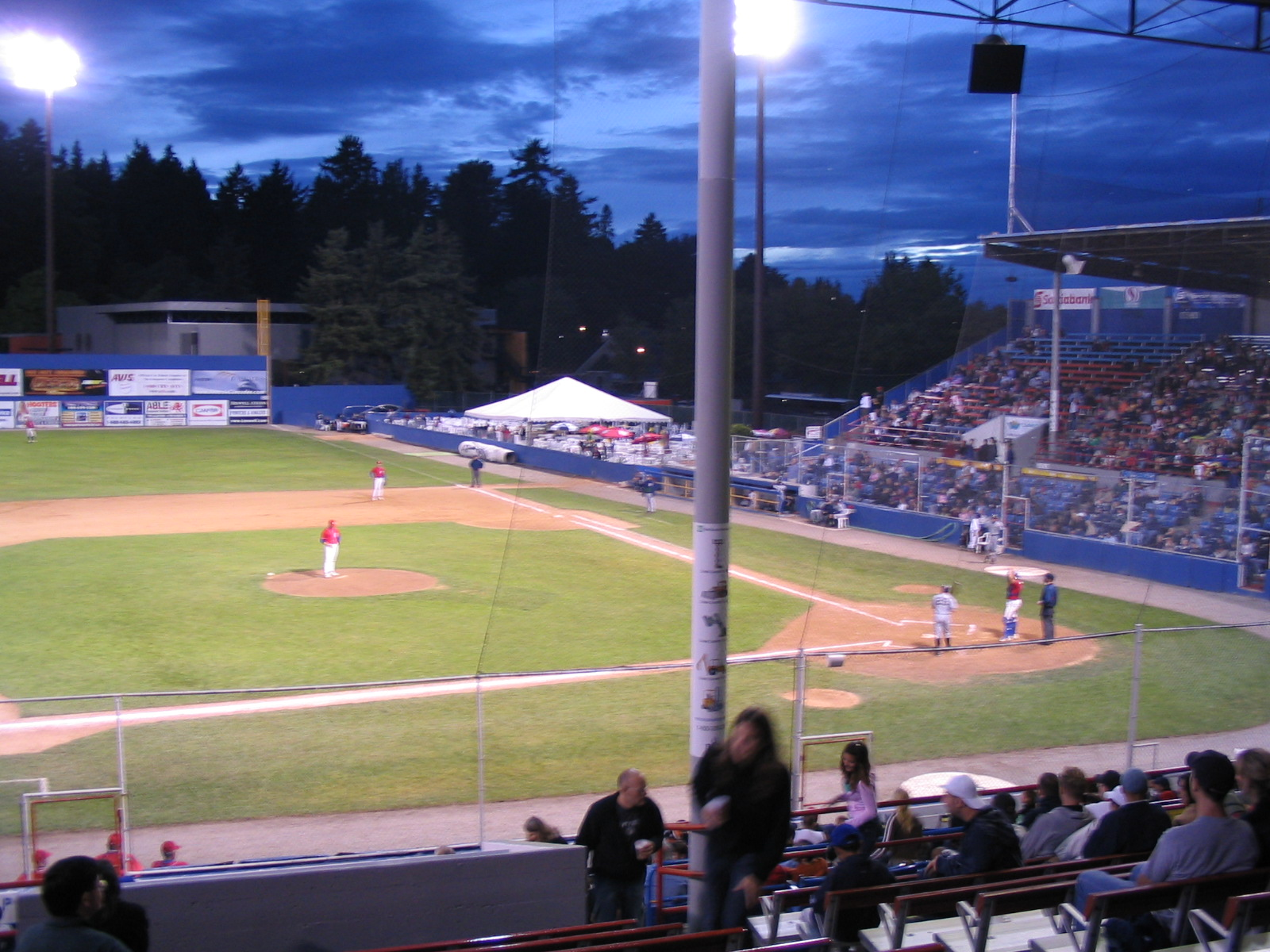
A 2007 game with the Class A Short Season Vancouver Canadians at Nat Bailey Stadium

Class A Short Season (officially Short-Season A) (Note: The classification is sometimes abbreviated "A (Short)" or "Class A-", with the latter used only as a written abbreviation (it is not called "Class A-minus").) was a level of play in Minor League Baseball in the United States (Note: Some teams in Canada also played at this level, the last of which was the Vancouver Canadians.) from 1965 through 2020. In the hierarchy of minor league classifications, it was below Triple-A, Double-A, Class A-Advanced (created in 1990), and Class A. Teams in Class A Short Season played about 75 to 80 games per season, compared to the 130- to 140-game seasons of most professional baseball minor leagues.

As part of the 2021 reorganization of the minor leagues, Class A Short Season was eliminated along with its two leagues, the New York–Penn League and Northwest League. Nine of the 22 active short-season teams were organized into new leagues at the High-A classification level.

== History ==
In 1965, the Northern League of Class A started a 66-game season in late June, a departure from the league's previous "full season" schedules of about 120 games. In December 1965, the Northwest League announced that it would play an 85-game schedule starting in late June 1966, limiting teams to no more than two veteran players on their 25-man rosters.

After playing the 1966 season with two short-season leagues, (Note: 1966 is the first season for which Baseball-Reference.com differentiates full-season and short-season Class A leagues.) the New York–Penn League also moved to a short-season format, playing an 80-game schedule beginning in late June 1967. The three leagues continued to play short seasons through 1971. In February 1972, the Northern League folded, due to reduced support from both fans and Major League Baseball (MLB) teams, leaving the New York–Penn League and Northwest League as the only two short-season leagues. Both leagues operated annually through 2019. (Note: The 2020 minor league season was cancelled due to impact of the COVID-19 pandemic on sports.)

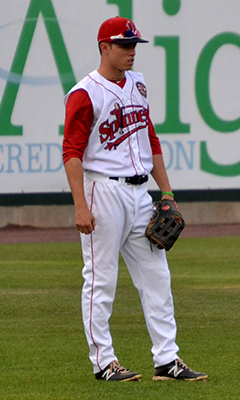
Outfielder Mike Meyers with the Class A Short Season Lowell Spinners in 2014 (Note: Meyers played in Boston's farm system from 2012 to 2017.)

Class A Short Season was originally the fourth-highest level in the minor leagues; with the addition of Class A-Advanced in 1990, Class A Short Season became fifth in the overall hierarchy:

1. Triple-A
2. Double-A
3. Class A-Advanced
4. Class A ("Full-Season A")
5. Class A Short Season ("Short-Season A")
6. Rookie league

Before the 2021 season, MLB restructured the minor leagues, temporarily discontinuing the use of historical league names within Minor League Baseball and permanently eliminating Class A Short Season. This effectively contracted Class A from having three levels to two, with Class A-Advanced and full-season Class A continuing on as "High-A" and "Low-A", respectively.

=== Dispersal of Class A Short Season teams ===
When the classification was ended before the 2021 season, there were two leagues with a total of 22 active teams.

Of the 14 active teams in the New York–Penn League:

- four joined the MLB Draft League: Mahoning Valley Scrappers, State College Spikes, West Virginia Black Bears, and Williamsport Crosscutters
- three joined the High-A East league: Aberdeen IronBirds, Brooklyn Cyclones, and Hudson Valley Renegades
- two joined the Futures Collegiate Baseball League: Vermont Lake Monsters and Norwich Sea Unicorns
- two joined the Perfect Game Collegiate Baseball League: Batavia Muckdogs and Auburn Doubledays
- two folded: Staten Island Yankees, Lowell Spinners
- one joined the independent Frontier League: Tri-City ValleyCats

Of the eight active teams in the Northwest League:

- six joined the High-A West league: Eugene Emeralds, Everett AquaSox, Hillsboro Hops, Spokane Indians, Tri-City Dust Devils, and Vancouver Canadians
- one joined the independent Pioneer League: Boise Hawks
- one joined the amateur Mavericks Independent Baseball League: Salem-Keizer Volcanoes

== Purpose ==
Teams in short-season leagues played schedules of about 75 to 80 games, starting in mid-June and ending in early September, with only a few off-days during the season. The late start of the season was designed to allow college baseball players to complete their college seasons in the spring, be selected in the MLB draft in June, signed, and then be immediately placed in a competitive league. Players in short-season leagues were a mixture of newly signed draftees who were considered more advanced than other draftees, and second-year pros who were not yet ready, or for whom there was not space, to move up the minor league hierarchy. Second-year pros were often assigned to "extended spring training" in Florida or Arizona during April and May, before reporting to their short-season leagues.
