= Northwest League Most Valuable Player Award =

- Sport: Baseball
- League: Northwest League
- Awarded for: Regular-season most valuable player of the Northwest League
- Country: United States
- Presented by: Northwest League

History
- First award: Kevin Coughlon & Tony Gwynn (1981)
- Most recent: Felnin Celesten (2026)

The Northwest League Most Valuable Player Award (MVP) is an annual award given to the best player in Minor League Baseball's Northwest League based on their regular-season performance as voted on by league managers. League broadcasters, Minor League Baseball executives, and members of the media have previously voted as well. Though the league was established in 1955, the award was not created until 1981. After the cancellation of the 2020 season, the league was known as the High-A West in 2021 before reverting to the Northwest League name in 2022.

Twenty-two outfielders have won the MVP Award, the most of any position. First basemen, with 13 winners, have won the most among infielders, followed by third basemen (8), shortstops (4), and second basemen (1). No pitchers or catchers have won the award.

One player who has won the MVP Award also won the Northwest League Top MLB Prospect Award in the same season: Zac Veen (2022). From 1981 to 2014, pitchers were eligible to win the MVP Award as no award was designated for pitchers. In 2015, the Northwest League established a Pitcher of the Year Award.

Twelve players from the Spokane Indians have been selected for the MVP Award, more than any other team in the league, followed by the Everett AquaSox (9); the Boise Hawks (5); the Eugene Emeralds and Salem-Keizer Volcanoes (4); the Vancouver Canadians (3); the Medford Athletics, Southern Oregon Timberjacks, and Yakima Bears (2); and the Bellingham Mariners, Everett Giants, Tri-Cities Triplets, and Walla Walla Padres (1).

Ten players from the Seattle Mariners Major League Baseball (MLB) organization have won the award, more than any other, followed by the San Diego Padres organization (7); the Oakland Athletics, San Francisco Giants, and Texas Rangers organizations (5); the Colorado Rockies and Los Angeles Angels organizations (4); the Kansas City Royals organization (3); the Arizona Diamondbacks and Toronto Blue Jays organizations (2); and the Chicago Cubs organization (1).

== Winners ==
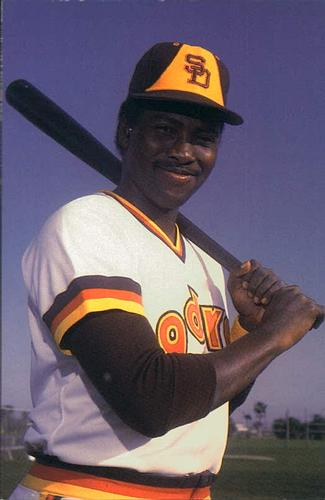
Tony Gwynn won the first Northwest League Most Valuable Player Award in 1981 and was inducted into the Baseball Hall of Fame in 2007.

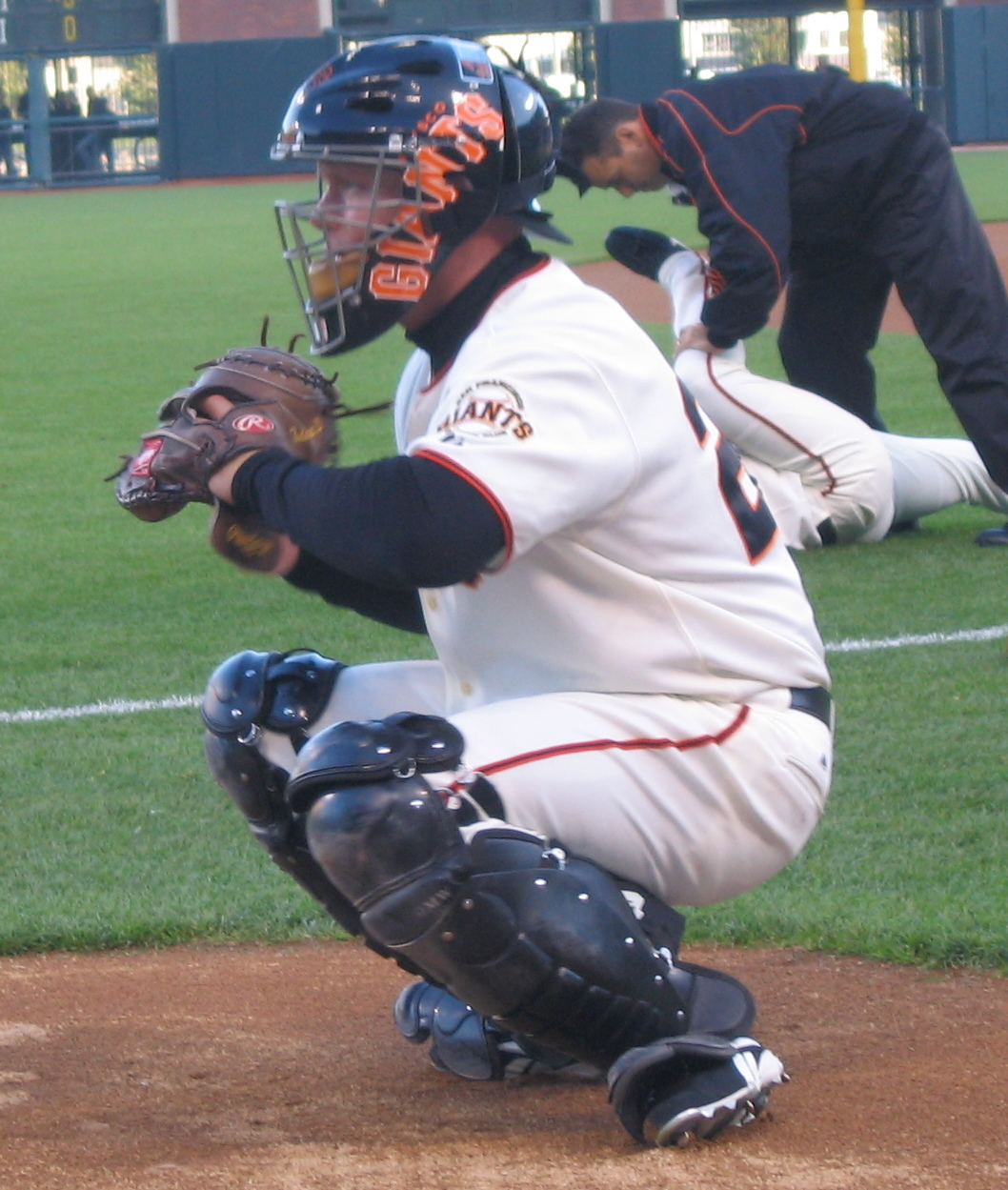
Todd Greene won the 1993 Most Valuable Player Award.

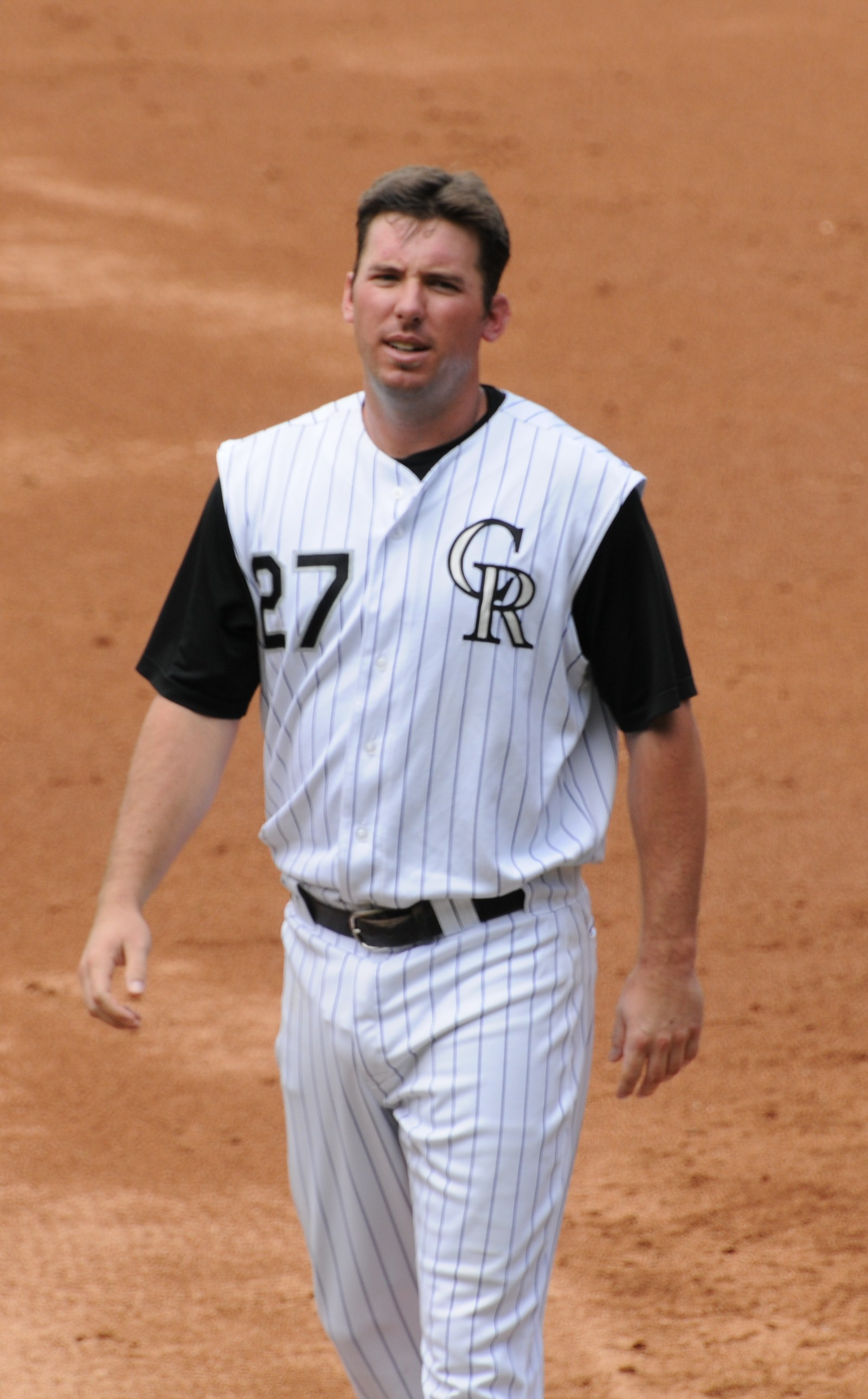
Garrett Atkins was chosen as the Most Valuable Player in 2000.

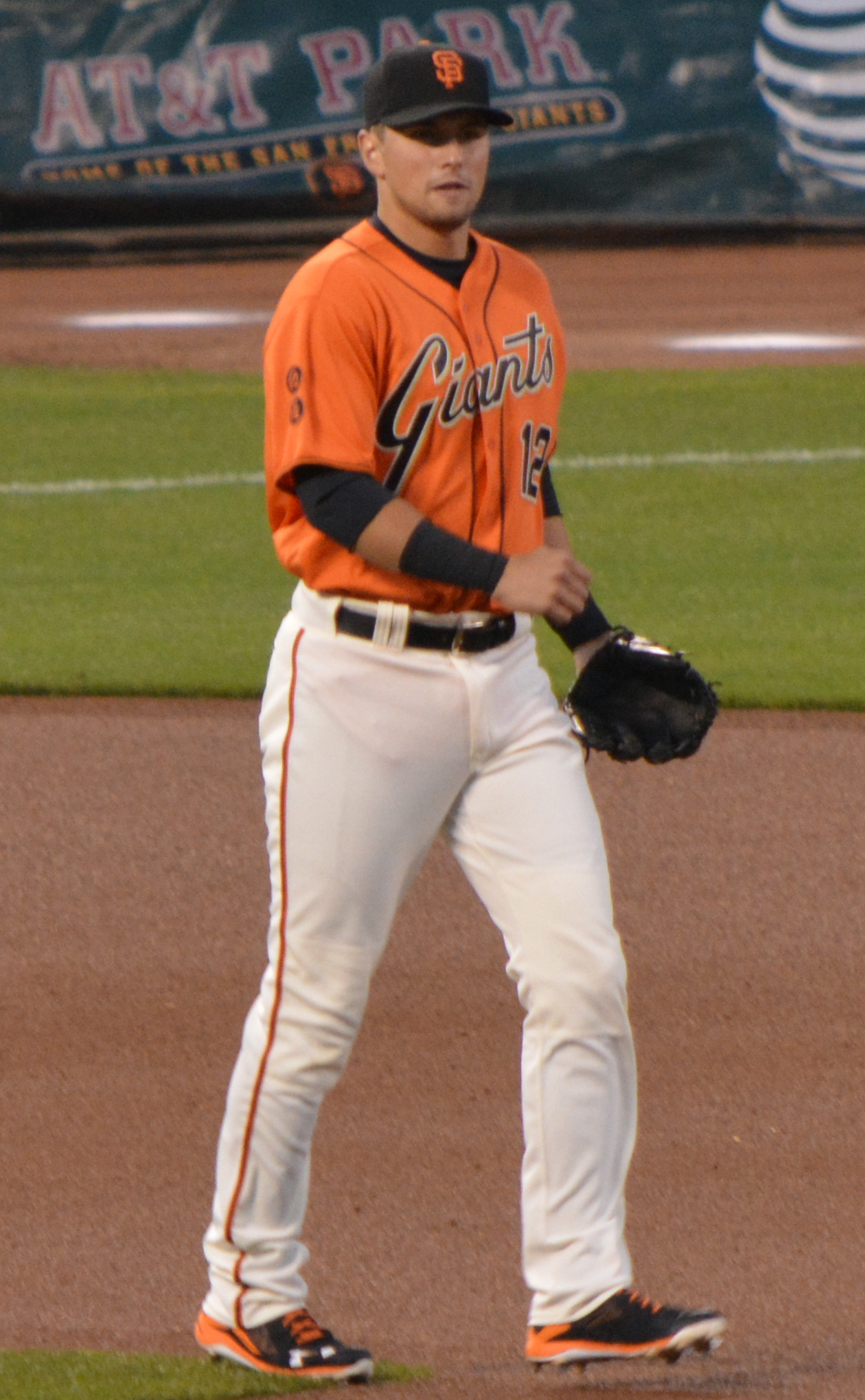
Joe Panik, the 2011 MVP, was selected to play in the 2015 MLB All-Star Game.

Key
Position	Indicates the player's primary position
^	Indicates multiple award winners in the same year

Winners
Year	Winner	Team	Organization	Position	Ref(s).
1981^	Kevin Coughlon	Medford Athletics	Oakland Athletics	Outfielder	
1981^	Tony Gwynn	Walla Walla Padres	San Diego Padres	Outfielder	
1982	Phil Strom	Medford Athletics	Oakland Athletics	First baseman	
1983	Bert Martinez	Tri-Cities Triplets	Texas Rangers	Third baseman	
1984	Sam Haley	Bellingham Mariners	Seattle Mariners	Outfielder	
1985	Jerald Clark	Spokane Indians	San Diego Padres	Outfielder	
1986	Dave Nash	Everett Giants	San Francisco Giants	Outfielder	
1987	Steve Hendricks	Spokane Indians	San Diego Padres	First baseman	
1988	Stan Royer	Southern Oregon Athletics	Oakland Athletics	Third baseman	
1989	Dave Staton	Spokane Indians	San Diego Padres	Third baseman	
1990	Matt Mieske	Spokane Indians	San Diego Padres	Outfielder	
1991	Joe Randa	Eugene Emeralds	Kansas City Royals	Third baseman	
1992	Larry Sutton	Eugene Emeralds	Kansas City Royals	First baseman	
1993	Todd Greene	Boise Hawks	California Angels	Outfielder	
1994	John Donati	Boise Hawks	California Angels	First baseman	
1995	Danny Buxbaum	Boise Hawks	California Angels	First baseman	
1996	Robert Zachmann	Everett AquaSox	Seattle Mariners	First baseman	
1997	Dee Brown	Spokane Indians	Kansas City Royals	Outfielder	
1998	Jason Hart	Southern Oregon Timberjacks	Oakland Athletics	First baseman	
1999	Robb Quinlan	Boise Hawks	Anaheim Angels	Third baseman	
2000^	Garrett Atkins	Portland Rockies	Colorado Rockies	First baseman	
2000^	Jamal Strong	Everett AquaSox	Seattle Mariners	Outfielder	
2001	J. J. Johnson	Boise Hawks	Chicago Cubs	Outfielder	
2002	Ismael Castro	Everett AquaSox	Seattle Mariners	Second baseman	
2003	Conor Jackson	Yakima Bears	Arizona Diamondbacks	Outfielder	
2004	Javier Herrera	Vancouver Canadians	Oakland Athletics	Outfielder	
2005	Steve Murphy	Spokane Indians	Texas Rangers	Outfielder	
2006	Cyle Hankerd	Yakima Bears	Arizona Diamondbacks	Outfielder	
2007^	Matt Downs	Salem-Keizer Volcanoes	San Francisco Giants	First baseman	
2007^	Luis Durango	Eugene Emeralds	San Diego Padres	Outfielder	
2008	Daniel Robertson	Eugene Emeralds	San Diego Padres	Outfielder	
2009	Drew Biery	Salem-Keizer Volcanoes	San Francisco Giants	Third baseman	
2010	Jared Hoying	Spokane Indians	Texas Rangers	Outfielder	
2011	Joe Panik	Salem-Keizer Volcanoes	San Francisco Giants	Shortstop	
2012	Patrick Kivlehan	Everett AquaSox	Seattle Mariners	Third baseman	
2013	L. B. Dantzler	Vancouver Canadians	Toronto Blue Jays	First baseman	
2014	Franklin Barreto	Vancouver Canadians	Toronto Blue Jays	Shortstop	
2015	Drew Jackson	Everett AquaSox	Seattle Mariners	Shortstop	
2016	Eric Filia	Everett AquaSox	Seattle Mariners	Outfielder	
2017	Ryan Kirby	Salem-Keizer Volcanoes	San Francisco Giants	First baseman	
2018	Curtis Terry	Spokane Indians	Texas Rangers	First baseman	
2019	Blaine Crim	Spokane Indians	Texas Rangers	First baseman	
2020	None selected (season cancelled due to COVID-19 pandemic)				
2021	Andy Pages	Everett AquaSox	Seattle Mariners	Outfielder	
2022	Zac Veen	Spokane Indians	Colorado Rockies	Outfielder	
2023	Jordan Beck	Spokane Indians	Colorado Rockies	Outfielder	
2024	Kyle Karros	Spokane Indians	Colorado Rockies	Third baseman	
2025	Lázaro Montes	Everett AquaSox	Seattle Mariners	Outfielder	
2026	Felnin Celesten	Everett AquaSox	Seattle Mariners	Shortstop	

== Wins by team ==
Active Northwest League teams appear in bold.

Team	Award(s)	Year(s)
**Spokane Indians**	12	1985, 1987, 1989, 1990, 1997, 2005, 2010, 2018, 2019, 2022, 2023, 2024
**Everett AquaSox**	9	1996, 2000, 2002, 2012, 2015, 2016, 2021, 2025, 2026
Boise Hawks	5	1993, 1994, 1995, 1999, 2001
**Eugene Emeralds**	4	1991, 1992, 2007, 2008
Salem-Keizer Volcanoes	4	2007, 2009, 2011, 2017
**Vancouver Canadians**	3	2004, 2013, 2014
Medford Athletics	2	1981, 1982
Southern Oregon Timberjacks (Southern Oregon Athletics)	2	1988, 1998
Yakima Bears	2	2003, 2006
Bellingham Mariners	1	1984
Everett Giants	1	1986
Portland Rockies	1	2000
Tri-Cities Triplets	1	1983
Walla Walla Padres	1	1981

== Wins by organization ==
Active Northwest League–Major League Baseball affiliations appear in bold.

Organization	Award(s)	Year(s)
**Seattle Mariners**	10	1984, 1996, 2000, 2002, 2012, 2015, 2016, 2021, 2025, 2026
San Diego Padres	7	1981, 1985, 1987, 1989, 1990, 2007, 2008
Oakland Athletics	5	1981, 1982, 1988, 1998, 2004
**San Francisco Giants**	5	1986, 2007, 2009, 2011, 2017
Texas Rangers	5	1983, 2005, 2010, 2018, 2019
**Colorado Rockies**	4	2000, 2022, 2023, 2024
**Los Angeles Angels** (California/Anaheim Angels)	4	1993, 1994, 1995, 1999
Kansas City Royals	3	1991, 1992, 1997
**Arizona Diamondbacks**	2	2003, 2006
**Toronto Blue Jays**	2	2013, 2014
Chicago Cubs	1	2001
