= La Grande Babes =

- 1891–1913; (1891, 1902, 1908, 1912–1913); La Grande, Oregon

Minor league affiliations
- Class: Independent (1891); Class D (1902, 1908)
- League: Pacific Interstate League (1891); Inland Empire League (1902, 1908); Western Tri-State League (1912–1913)

Major league affiliations
- Team: None

Minor league titles
- League titles (2): 1891; 1908

Team data
- Name: La Grande Grand Rhonders (1891); La Grande Beetpullers (1902); La Grande Babes (1908); La Grande Pippins (1912); La Grande Spuds (1913)
- Ballpark: Stanfield (1912)

The La Grande Babes were a minor league baseball team based in La Grande, Oregon in 1908, as numerous Le Grande teams played minor league baseball between 1891 and 1913, with different nicknames each season. La Grande teams played as members of the 1891 Pacific Interstate League, 1902 and 1908 Inland Empire League and Western Tri-State League in 1912 and 1913. Lagrande captured two league championships, as the La Grande Rhonders won the 1891 Pacific Interstate League title and the La Grande Babes won the 1908 Inland Empire League championship.

== History ==
La Grande, Oregon first hosted minor league baseball in 1891. La Grande won a championship in their first season. The La Grande Grand Rhonders were one of four franchises who formed the Pacific Interstate League. The Independent level league began play with the Baker Bunch Grassers, Pendleton Giants/Ho Hos and Walla Walla Walla Wallas joining La Grande as charter members in beginning league play on June 6, 1891.

The La Grande Grand Rhonders began play in the Pacific Interstate League and won the Pacific Interstate League championship. La Grande finished the season with a 20–10 record under manager A. Miller, finishing 2.0 games ahead of second place Pendelton. In the final standings, La Grande was followed by the Pendleton Giants/Ho Hos (18–12), Walla Walla Walla Wallas (16–14) and Baker Bunch Grassers (6–24) in the final Pacific Interstate League standings. The Pacific Interstate League permanently folded following the 1891 season.

La Grande resumed minor league play in 1902, as the La Grande Beetpullers became charter members of the 1902 Inland Empire League, which formed as a Class D level four–team league. Other charter members were the Baker City Gold Diggers, Pendleton Indians and Walla Walla Sharpshooters. The official 1902 league standings and statistics are unknown. Local papers show Pendleton defeating La Grande 2–0 and Walla Walla defeating Baker 6–0 on in games on August 25, 1902.

The team records on August 25, 1902, were reported to be: Pendleton 21–8, Walla Walla 14–15, La Grande 12–16 and Baker City 10–18. The La Grande managers were Walsh, Black and Al Ray.

La Grande resumed play as the Inland Empire League formed again in 1908, with the same four cities hosting franchises, including La Grande. The La Grande Babes won the league championship under manager O'Brien, playing with the Baker Nuggets/Miners, Pendleton Pets/Wheat Growers and Walla Walla Walla Wallas. The league began play on June 10, 1908. However, the league permanently disbanded on Sunday, July 12, 1908 due to extreme heat.

At the time the league folded on July 12, 1908, the La Grande Babes were in first place. La Grande, with a 19–12 record were 2.5 games ahead of the 2nd place Baker Nuggets/Miners, who finished with a record of 15–15. They were followed by the Walla Walla Walla Wallas (14–17) and Pendleton Pets/Wheat Growers (14–18) in the final standings. The Inland league did not return to play after the 1908 season.

In 1912, the La Grande Pippins began play as charter members of the four–team Class D level Western Tri-State League, along with the Boise Irrigators, Pendleton Buckaroos and Walla Walla Bears. The Golddiggers ended the season with a record of 31–67, playing under managers James Bradley and Jack Barry. The Pippins placed fourth, finishing 30.0 games behind the 1st place Walla Walla Bears.

In the final minor league season for La Grange, the 1913 La Grange Spuds continued play as members of the six–team the Western Tri-State League but folded before the end of the season. On June 22, 1913, La Grange folded with a 16–31 record, having played under manager Karl King.

La Grange, Oregon has not hosted another minor league team.

== The ballpark ==
A regional newspaper reported on June 22, 1912 that La Grange played a home game at a ballpark named Stanfield.

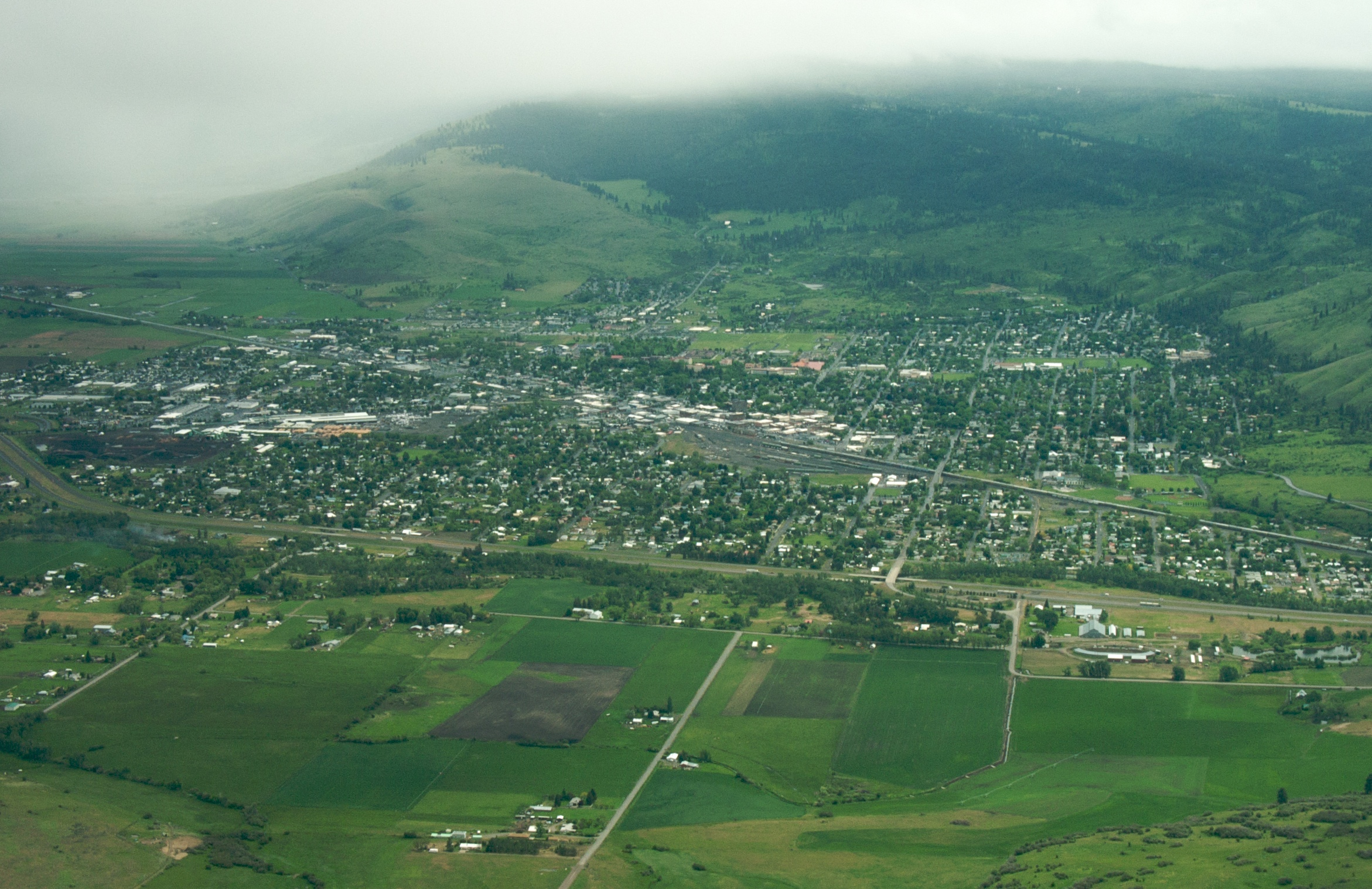
(2008) La Grande, Oregon. aerial

== Timeline ==
Year(s)	# Yrs.	Team	Level	League
1891	1	La Grande Grand Rhonders	Independent	Pacific Interstate League
1902	1	La Grande Beetpullers	Class D	Inland Empire League
1908	1	La Grande Babes	Class D	Inland Empire League
1912	1	La Grande Pippins	Class D	Western Tri-State League
1913	1	La Grande Spuds	Class D	Western Tri-State League

== Year–by–year records ==
Year	Record	Finish	Manager	Playoffs/Notes
1891	20–10	1st	A. Miller	League champions
1902	12–16	3rd	Walsh / Black / Al Ray	No playoffs held
1908	19–12	1st	O'Brien	League folded July 12; League champions
1912	31–67	4th	James Bradley / Jack Barry	No playoffs held
1913	16–31	NA	Karl King	Team folded June 22

== Notable alumni ==
- Pat Flaherty (1891)
- Fred Osborne (1891)
- Jud Smith (1891)
- La Grande Grand Rhonders players
