= Pendleton Buckaroos =

- 1912–1914; (1891, 1902, 1908, 1912–1914); Pendleton, Oregon

Minor league affiliations
- Class: Independent (1891); Class D (1902, 1908, 1912–1914)
- League: Pacific Interstate League (1891); Inland Empire League (1902, 1908); Western Tri-State League (1912–1914)

Major league affiliations
- Team: None

Minor league titles
- League titles (2): 1902; 1914

Team data
- Name: Pendleton Ho Hos (1891); Pendleton Indians (1902); Pendleton Pets (1908); Pendelton Buckaroos (1912–1914)
- Ballpark: Round Up Park (1908, 1912–1914)

The Pendleton Buckaroos were a minor league baseball team based in Pendleton, Oregon. The Buckaroos were preceded by Pendleton teams that played as members of the Pacific Interstate League in 1891 and Inland Empire League in 1902 and 1908. The Buckaroos were members of the Class D level Western Tri-State League from 1912 to 1914. Pendleton won league championships in 1902 and 1914.

The teams hosted all home minor league games at Round Up Park in Pendleton.

== History ==
Pendleton, Oregon first hosted minor league play in 1891, when the Pendleton Ho Hos became a charter member of Pacific Interstate League. The Independent level league comprised the Ho Hos, the La Grande Grand Rhonders, Baker Bunch Grassers and Walla Walla Walla Wallas as the charter members in the only season of play for the league.

The Pendleton Ho Hos began play in the Pacific Interstate League on June 6, 1891. The Le Grande Grande Rhonedrs won the Pacific Interstate League championship with a 20–10 record. The Pendleton Ho Hos ended the season in second place, finishing 2.0 games behind with a record of 18–12. The Rhoneers were followed by the Walla Walla Walla Wallas (16–14) and Baker Bunch Grassers (6–24) in the final Pacific Interstate League standings.

The Pendleton Indians were charter members of the 1902 Inland Empire League, a Class D level four–team league, with teams based in the same four cities as the Pacific Interstate League years earlier. The Baker City Gold Diggers, La Grande Beetpullers and Walla Walla Sharpshooters teams joined the Indians in league play. The official 1902 league standings and statistics are unknown. A newspaper report had Pendleton defeating La Grande 2–0 and Walla Walla defeating Baker 6–0 on in games on August 25, 1902.

The team standings on August 25, 1902, were reported as: Pendleton 21–8, Walla Walla 14–15, La Grande 12–16 and Baker City 10–18. The Pendleton team was managed by Cohen. The league folded following the 1902 season. The Inland Empire League folded following the 1902 season.

Pendleton resumed play as the Inland Empire League formed again in 1908, with the same four cities hosting franchises, including Pendleton. The league began play on June 10, 1908. However, the league permanently disbanded on Sunday, July 12, 1908, due to extreme heat. The Pendleton Indians placed fourth under managers Tatom and Lorimer, playing with the Baker Nuggets/Miners, La Grande Babes and Walla Walla Walla Wallas.

At the time the league folded in 1908, the La Grande Babes, with a 19–12 record were in first place, 2.5 games ahead of the second place Baker Nuggets/Miners, who finished with a record of 15–15. They were followed by the Walla Walla Walla Wallas (14–17) and Pendleton Pets, who had a record of 14–18, in the final standings. The Inland Empire League permanently folded following the shortened 1908 season.

In 1912, the Pendleton Buckaroos were formed and began play as charter members of the four–team Class D level Western Tri-State League. Pendelton joined the Boise Irrigators, La Grange Golddiggers and Walla Walla Bears in league play.

In their first season of Western Tri-State League play, the Buckaroos placed third. Pendleton ended the season with a record of 53–51, playing the season under manager Jess Garrett, finishing 11.0 games behind the first place Walla Walla Bears in the final standings. George Pembroke of Pendelton won the league batting title, hitting .328.

The 1913 Pendleton Buckaroos continued play as members of the six–team the Western Tri-State League. Playing under managers Terry McKune and Al Lodell, Pendelton placed fourth with a 53–51 record, finishing 16.0 games behind the first place Boise Irrigators in the final standings, as the league held no playoffs. The league continued play as a four team league after Baker and Walla Walla both folded on June 28.

In their final season of play, the 1914 Pendleton Buckaroos won the Western Tri-State League championship. As the league reduced to four teams, Pendleton had a record of 53–37 to place first, playing the season under returning manager Al Lodell. The Buckaroos finished 6.0 games ahead of the second place Walla Walla Bears (53–43), followed by the Baker Miners (44–52) and North Yakima Braves (36–60) in the final standings. George Pembroke won his second league batting title, hitting .349. Pendleton pitchers Clyde Schroeder led the league with 206 strikeouts, while teammate Arch Osborne won 15 games to lead the league.

The Western Tri-State League permanently folded following the 1914 season. Pendleton, Oregon has not hosted another minor league team.

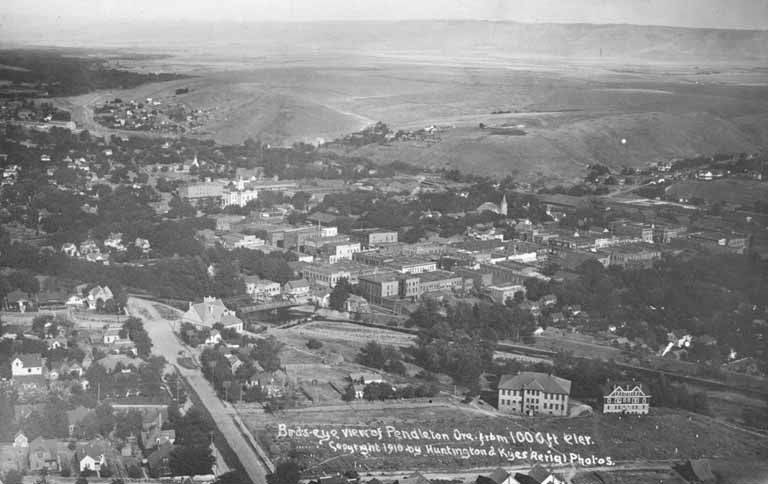
(1910) Bird's-eye view of Pendleton, Oregon

== The ballpark ==
The Pendleton teams hosted minor league home games at Round Up Park. The ballpark site is still in use today as a public park, known as "Roy Raley Park." The park is located at 1330 SW Court Avenue & SW 10th Street in Pendleton.

== Timeline ==
Year(s)	# Yrs.	Team	Level	League	Ballpark
1891	1	Pendleton Ho Hos	Independent	Pacific Interstate League	Round Up Park
1902	1	Pendleton Indians	Class D	Inland Empire League	Round Up Park
1908	1	Pendleton Pets	Class D	Inland Empire League	Round Up Park
1912–1914	3	Pendleton Buckaroos	Class D	Western Tri-State League	Round Up Park

== Year–by–year records ==
Year	Record	Finish	Manager	Playoffs/Notes
1891	18–12	2nd	NA	No playoffs held
1902	21–8	1st	Cohen	League champions
1908	14–18	4th	Tatom / Lorimer	League folded July 12
1912	53–51	3rd	Jess Garrett	No playoffs held
1913	54–60	4th	Terry McKune / Al Lodell	No playoffs held
1914	53–37	1st	Al Lodell	League champions

== Notable alumni ==
- George Darby (1891)
- Al Lawson (1891)
- Solly Salisbury (1902)
- George Stovall (1902)
- Art Twineham (1891)
- Guerdon Whiteley (1891)
- Pendleton Ho Hos players
