= Baker City Gold Diggers =

- 1891–1914; (1891, 1902, 1908, 1913–1914); Baker City, Oregon

Minor league affiliations
- Class: Independent (1891); Class D (1902, 1908, 1913–1914)
- League: Pacific Interstate League (1891); Inland Empire League (1902, 1908); Western Tri-State League (1913–1914)

Major league affiliations
- Team: None

Minor league titles
- League titles (0): None

Team data
- Name: Baker City Bunch Grassers (1891); Baker City Gold Diggers (1902); Baker Nuggets/Baker Miners (1908); Baker City Golddiggers (1913); Baker City Miners (1914)
- Ballpark: Geiser-Pollman Park*

The Baker City Gold Diggers were a minor league baseball team based in Baker City, Oregon. Between 1891 and 1914, Baker City teams played as members of the 1891 Pacific Interstate League, 1902 and 1908 Inland Empire League and Western Tri-State League in 1913 and 1914, with a different team nickname each season.

== History ==
Baker City, Oregon first hosted minor league play in 1891, when the Baker Bunch Grassers were one of four charter members of the Independent level Pacific Interstate League. The La Grande Grand Rhonders, Pendleton Ho Hos and Walla Walla Walla Wallas teams joined Baker City in beginning league play on June 6, 1891.

The Baker Bunch Grassers began play in the Pacific Interstate League and finished last in 1891, playing the season under manager W. S. Bowers. The La Grande Grand Rhonders won the Pacific Interstate League championship with a 20–10 record. La Grande was followed by the Pendleton Giants/Ho Hos (18–12), Walla Walla Walla Wallas (16–14) and Baker Bunch Grassers (6–24) in the final Pacific Interstate League standings.

Baker City fielded a franchise as the 1902 Inland Empire League began play as a Class D level four–team league, with the Baker City Gold Diggers, La Grande Beetpullers, Pendleton Indians and Walla Walla Sharpshooters as charter members. The complete 1902 league standings and statistics are unknown. A game report noted Walla Walla defeated Baker 2–0 on July 25, 1902, in front of 300 fans at Baker. Another game report has Pendleton defeating La Grande 2–0 and Walla Walla defeating Baker 6–0 on August 25, 1902.

The team records on August 25, 1902, were reported to be: Pendleton 21–8, Walla Walla 14–15, La Grande 12–16 and Baker City 10–18.

The Inland Empire League formed again in 1908, with the same four cities hosting franchises, including Baker City. The Baker Nuggets/Miners, La Grande Babes, Pendleton Pets/Wheat Growers and Walla Walla Walla Wallas began league play on June 10, 1908. However, the league permanently disbanded on Sunday, July 12, 1908 due to extreme heat.

At the time the league folded in 1908, the La Grande Babes, with a 19–12 record were in first place 2.5 games ahead of the second place Baker Nuggets/Miners, who finished with a record of 15–15 under managers Cryderman and Hosie. They were followed by the Walla Walla Walla Wallas (14–17) and Pendleton Pets/Wheat Growers (14–18) in the final standings. The Inland league did not return to play after the 1908 season.

In 1913, the Baker City Golddiggers began play as members of the six–team Class D level Western Tri-State League but folded before the end of the season. The Golddiggers had a record of 15–40 under managers Con Harlow, Charles Harrod and Troeh when the franchise disbanded on June 23, 1913.

The Baker City Miners continued play in 1914 as members of the four–team the Western Tri-State League in the final minor league season for Baker City. The Miners ended the season in third place with a 44–52 record under manager Karl King, finishing 15.0 games behind the first place Pendleton Buckaroos.

Baker City, Oregon has not hosted another minor league team.

== The ballpark ==
The name of the Baker City home minor league ballpark is not directly referenced. Geiser-Pollman Park was in use in the era as a private park and became the first public park in Baker City in 1908.

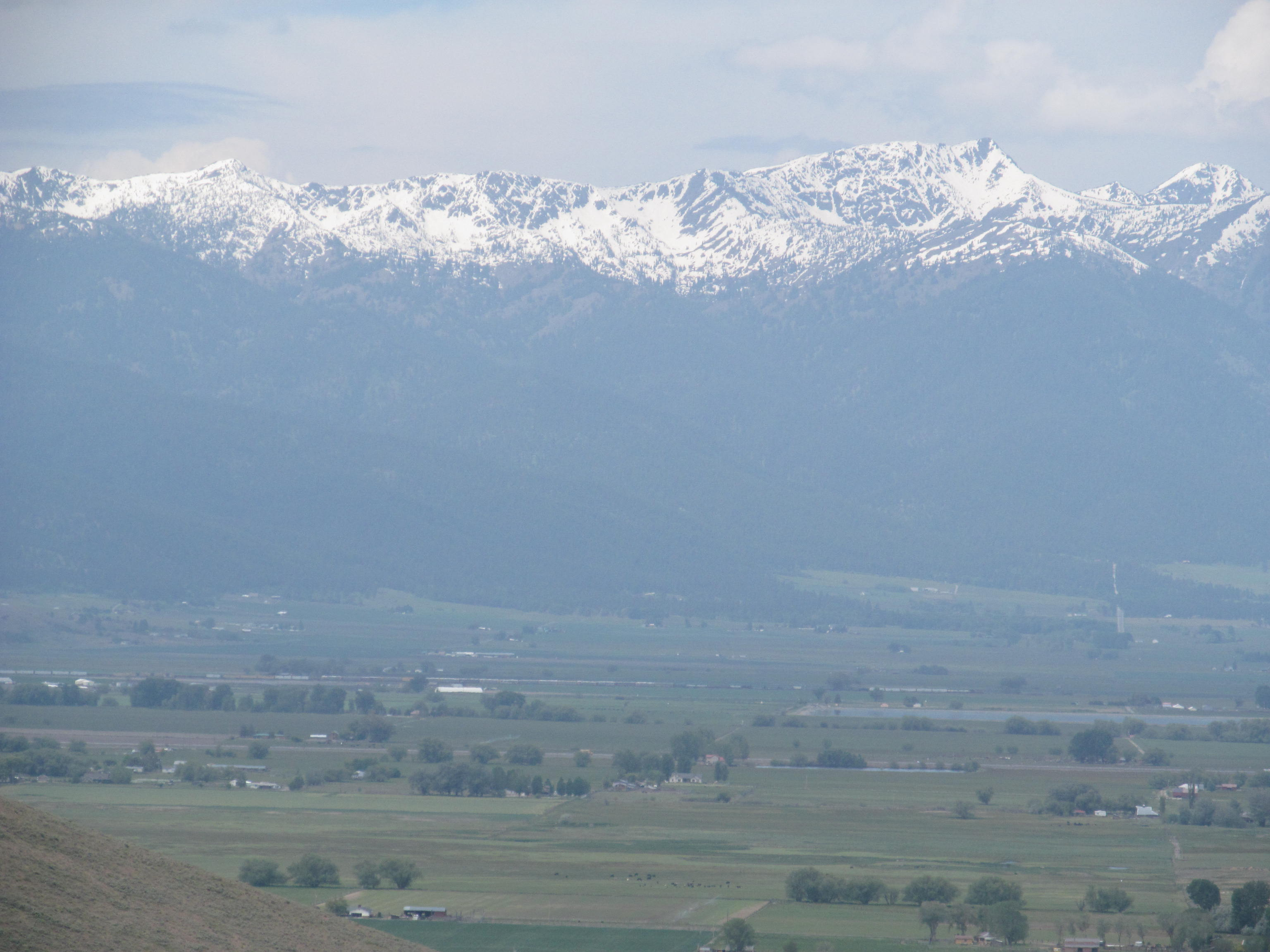
(2014) Blue Mountains. Baker City, Oregon

== Timeline ==
Year(s)	# Yrs.	Team	Level	League
1891	1	Baker City Bunch Grassers	Independent	Pacific Interstate League
1902	1	Baker City Gold Diggers	Class D	Inland Empire League
1908	1	Baker Nuggets	Class D	Inland Empire League
1913	1	Baker City Golddiggers	Class D	Western Tri-State League
1914	1	Baker City Miners	Class D	Western Tri-State League

== Year–by–year records ==
Year	Record	Finish	Manager	Playoffs/Notes
1891	6–24	4th	W. S. Bowers	No playoffs held
1902	10–18	3rd	NA	No playoffs held
1908	15–15	2nd	Cryderman / Hosie	League folded July 8
1913	15–40	NA	Con Harlow / Charles Harrod / Troeh	Team folded June 23
1914	44–52	3rd	Karl King	No playoffs held

== Notable alumni ==
- Ray French (1914)
- Lou Mahaffey (1902)
- Con Starkel (1913)
- Suds Sutherland (1914)
- Baker City Golddiggers players
- Baker City Miners players
