= Perry Hill (baseball) =

American baseball coach (born 1952)

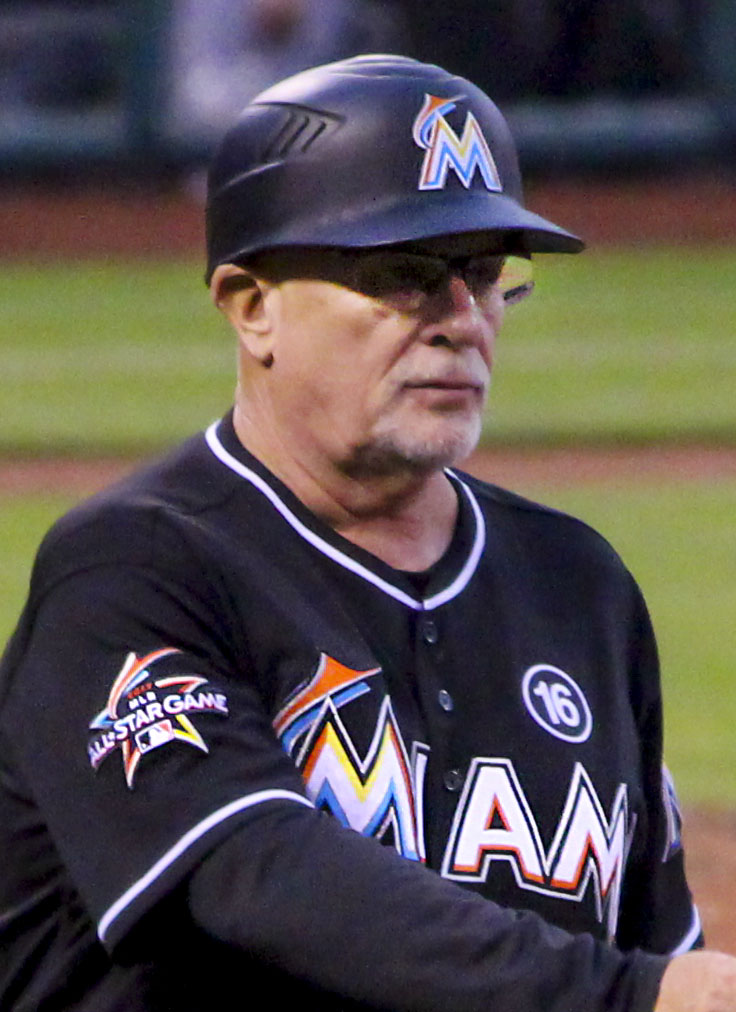
- Hill with the Miami Marlins
- Coach
- Born: March 19, 1952 (age 74); Salina, Kansas, U.S.
- Bats: Right Throws: Right
- Stats at Baseball Reference

Teams
- As coach: Texas Rangers (1992–1995); Detroit Tigers (1997–1999); Montreal Expos (2000–2001); Florida Marlins (2002–2006, 2011); Pittsburgh Pirates (2009); Miami Marlins (2013–2018); Seattle Mariners (2019–2026)

Career highlights and awards
- World Series champion (2003)

Perry Wendell Hill, (born March 19, 1952), nicknamed "Bone," is an American professional baseball coach. He has coached in Major League Baseball (MLB) for the Texas Rangers, Detroit Tigers, Montreal Expos, Florida / Miami Marlins, Pittsburgh Pirates, and Seattle Mariners. He is widely regarded as a top infield coach, repeatedly helping improve his teams' defense.

== Career ==
=== Playing career ===
Hill graduated from L.D. Bell High School in Hurst, Texas. He played college baseball at Paris Junior College and for the Pan American University Broncs in Texas. He played professionally for the Rio Grande Valley WhiteWings in 1976, then played for five seasons in Mexico.

=== Coaching career ===
Hill began his coaching career with the Texas Rangers' Class-A Tri-City Triplets in 1984. He coached for the Daytona Beach Islanders in 1985 and 1986, then became a Rangers' roving instructor from 1987 to 1991. In 1992, he became the Rangers' infield and first base coach, holding that post through 1995. He spent three years with the Detroit Tigers from 1997 through 1999, which in 1997 became the first MLB club to go from last to first in fielding percentage. He coached the Montreal Expos in 2000 and 2001, then coached the Florida Marlins from 2002 to 2006. He announced his retirement in March 2007, but returned to coaching in 2009 with the Pittsburgh Pirates for one season. The Pirates exercised an option to have Hill coach in 2010, but he declined the team's offer multiple times.

Hill was rehired by the Marlins to coach first base and infield for the 2011 season. After not coaching for the team in 2012 under new manager Ozzie Guillén, Hill returned to the Marlins in 2013. In 2017, he was named the best infield coach by MLB Network. He stayed in Miami until the end of the 2018 season.

Hill was hired by the Seattle Mariners as their first base and infield coach prior to the 2019 season. He coached remotely in 2020, due to health concerns related to the COVID-19 pandemic. He stopped being the Mariners' first base coach in 2022, replaced by Kristopher Negrón, but remained the team's infield coach.

Several players Hill has coached have credited them with improving their defense. Infielder Luis Castillo gave Hill one of his Gold Glove awards, and Dan Uggla and Mike Jacobs had Hill's nickname stitched into their gloves. J. P. Crawford said Hill saved his career and helped him win a Gold Glove.

== Personal life ==
Hill has two children, Alexis and Perry Jr.

Hill received his nickname of "Bone" as a child, after he carried around the bones from chicken wings.

Hill runs a baseball coaching company, Gold Glove Defense.

Hill was inducted into the Hurst-Euless-Bedford ISD Sports Hall of Fame and the Clarinda A's Hall of Fame in 2002 and the Paris Junior College Dragons Hall of Fame in 2014.

Hill's favorite baseball player is Mickey Mantle.
