= Blue Mountain Bears =

- 1983; Walla Walla, Washington

Minor league affiliations
- Class: Class A Short Season (1983)
- League: Northwest League (1983)
- Division: Washington

Major league affiliations
- Team: Independent (1983)

Team data
- Colors: Powder blue, red, navy blue, white
- Ballpark: Borleske Stadium (1983)
- Owner/ Operator: Peter C. Kern
- Manager: Ronald Mihal

The Blue Mountain Bears were a minor league baseball team located in Walla Walla, Washington. They were members of the Class A Short Season Northwest League for a single season in 1983.

The franchise was then purchased by Bob and Margaret Bavasi, who moved the team west to Everett and operated as the Everett Giants for eleven seasons. With a switch of affiliation to the Seattle Mariners in 1995, they became the AquaSox.

== History ==
From 1973 through 1982, the Walla Walla Padres were the Northwest League affiliate of the San Diego Padres, and the team was owned by Patrica Nelly. After years of declining attendance, the franchise was sold to New Jersey–based Big Six Sports. The new ownership group promptly moved the club west to Richland, and took the outfield fence with them. They rebranded as the Tri-Cities Triplets for 1983 and signed a player development contract with the Texas Rangers.

Seeking to enhance the Northwest League from six to eight teams to allow for improved travel, Commissioner Bob Freitas sought expansion. Along with Spokane, Walla Walla was tabbed as one of the expansion locations and Ohio businessman Peter C. Kern was awarded the franchise. In homage to Walla Walla baseball history, "Bears" was selected as the nickname. While that was familiar, the club elected the unique moniker "Blue Mountain" to provide a greater market appeal, a reference to the Blue Mountains that bisect the region. Due to the late finalization of the club, the Bears were unable to secure an affiliation with a major league team, and operated as an independent for the 1983 campaign.

== Ballpark ==
The Bears played at multi-sport Borleske Stadium, located at 409 West Rees Avenue; the vintage venue is still in use today.

== Team identity ==
The Blue Mountain Bears adopted a color scheme of Powder Blue, Red, Navy Blue, and White. On the field, the Bears were clad in powder blue uniforms. Unlike most teams who utilized powder blue as an alternative to road grey, the color was part of the Bears brand. Absent the traditional white and grey of baseball, the team donned the single powder blue uniform set for all games. Manufactured by Wilson, the jersey was a two button top with red/white/navy blue trim on the neck and sleeve ends. The jersey was embellished with a red on white on navy Blue script B applied in tackle twill. The back of the jersey featured a three-color number in Wilson block font.

In contrast to most teams wearing powder blue uniforms at the time, the Bears' pants utilized a belt similar to the Montreal Expos. The pants were trimmed with a navy blue/white/red stripe. The team wore red stirrups and belts, and capping off the uniform was a solid red hat with a two-color white, outlined in navy blue script B embroidered on the face.

== Regular season ==
1983 Blue Mountain Bears Game Log
Regular Season

June

Date	Opponent	Score	Overall Record
June 22	Tri-Cities	4–3 (12)	1–0
June 23	Tri-Cities	Rain Out	1–0
June 24	at Tri-Cities	2–5	1–1
June 25	at Tri-Cities	4–1	2–1
June 26	at Tri-Cities	6–11	2–2
June 27	Bellingham	1–11	2–3
June 28	Bellingham	2–4	2–4
June 29	Spokane	3–8	2–5
June 30	Spokane	1–0	3–5

July

Date	Opponent	Score	Overall Record
July 1	at Bellingham	2–2 (7)	3–5
July 2	at Bellingham	0–2	3–6
July 3	at Bellingham	2–3	3–7
July 4	at Spokane	4–5	3–8
July 5	at Spokane	3–1	4–8
July 7	Eugene	6–5	5–8
July 8	Eugene	7–6 (12)	6–8
July 9	Eugene	4–5 (10)	6–9
July 10	Eugene	12–13 (10)	6–10
July 11	Salem	2–4 (13)	6–11
July 12	Salem	6–4	7–11
July 13	Salem	Rain Out	7–11
July 14	at Eugene	6–5	8–11
July 15	at Eugene	7–12	8–12
July 16	at Eugene	6–11	8–13
July 17	at Salem (Make up from July 13)	6–0	9–13
July 17	at Salem	4–9	9–14
July 18	at Salem	4–0	10–14
July 19	at Salem	5–6 (12)	10–15
July 20	at Salem	6–3	11–15
July 21	at Tri-Cities	3–4	11–16
July 22	at Tri-Cities	11–7	12–16
July 23	Tri-Cities (Make up from June 22)	5–1	13–16
July 23	Tri-Cities	0–7	13–17
July 24	Tri-Cities	7–2	14–17
July 25	Bellingham	0–5	14–18
July 26	Bellingham	2–3	14–19
July 27	Bellingham	8–6	15–19
July 28	Spokane (Played in Lewiston, ID)	11–3	16–19
July 29	Spokane (Played in Lewiston, ID)	4–6	16–20
July 30	at Bellingham	2–11	16–21
July 31	at Bellingham (Make up from July 1)	5–6	16–22
July 31	at Bellingham	4–5	16–23

August

Date	Opponent	Score	Overall Record
August 1	at Spokane	4–3	17–23
August 2	at Spokane	6–11	17–24
August 3	at Spokane	10–0	18–24
August 4	Northwest League All-Star Game at Tri-Cities		
August 5	Medford	3–9	18–25
August 6	Medford	6–3	19–25
August 7	Medford	5–6	19–26
August 8	Bend	9–8	20–26
August 9	Bend	4–3	21–26
August 10	Bend	3–2	22–26
August 11	Bend	11–4	23–26
August 12	at Medford	19–1	24–26
August 13	at Medford	2–5	24–27
August 14	at Medford	0–3	24–28
August 15	at Medford	0–7	24–29
August 16	at Bend	0–6	24–30
August 17	at Bend	5–4	25–30
August 18	at Bend	10–9 (10)	26–30
August 19	Spokane	12–3	27–30
August 20	Spokane	3–4 (10)	27–31
August 21	Spokane	1–6	27–32
August 22	Bellingham	1–5	27–33
August 23	Bellingham	Rain Out	27–33
August 24	Tri-Cities	3–1	28–33
August 25	Tri-Cities	0–3	28–34
August 26	Tri-Cities	3–2	29–34
August 27	at Tri-Cities	0–9	29–35
August 28	at Tri-Cities	3–2	30–35
August 29	at Spokane	7–2	31–35
August 30	at Spokane	8–3	32–35
August 31	at Bellingham (Make up from August 23)	2–3	32–36
August 31	at Bellingham	4–1	33–36

September

Date	Opponent	Score	Overall Record
September 1	at Bellingham	Rain Out	33–36

== Season-by-season record ==
Season	PDC	Division	Finish	Wins	Losses	Win%	Postseason	Manager	Attendance
Blue Mountain Bears
1983		Washington	2nd	33	36	.478		Ronald Mihal	9,019

Preceded by Expansion franchise	Northwest League franchise (1983)	Succeeded by Everett Giants
