= Borleske Stadium =

Stadium in Walla Walla, Washington, US

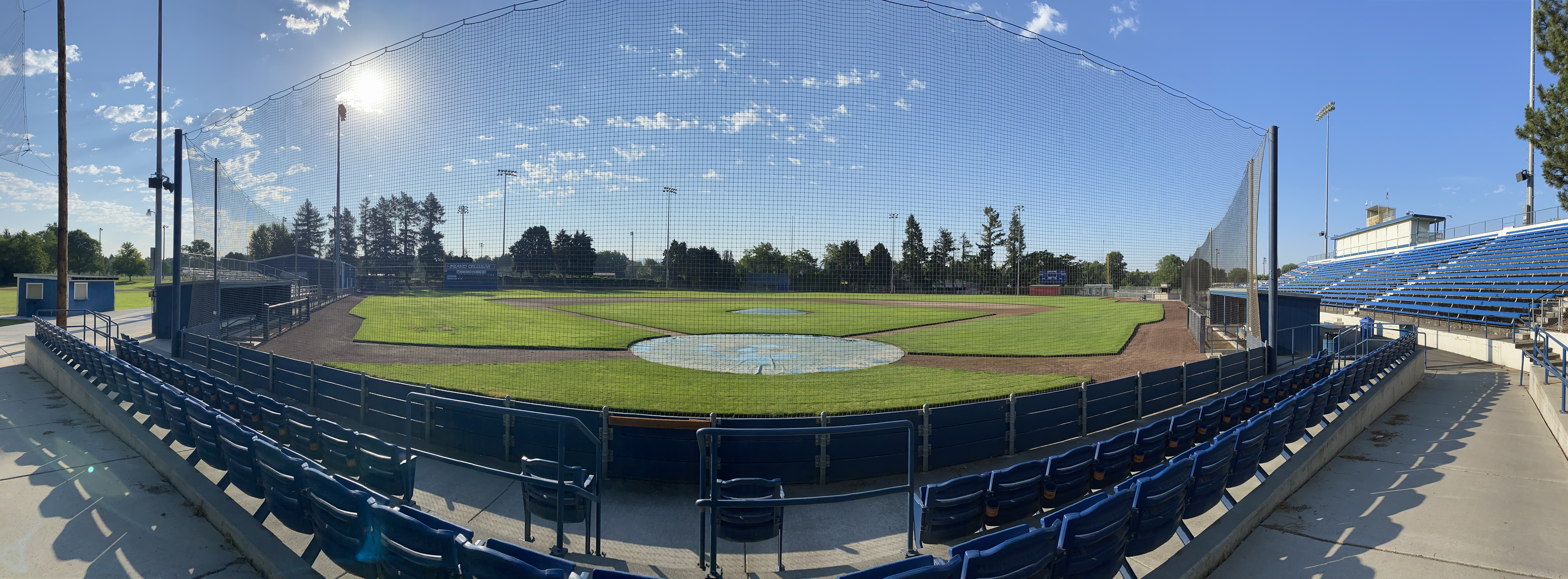
- View from behind home plate in 2020

- Location in the United States Location in Washington
- Interactive map of Borleske Stadium
- Address: 409 W. Rees Avenue
- Location: Walla Walla, Washington, U.S.
- Coordinates: 46.077°N 118.336°W
- Elevation: 950 feet (290 m) AMSL
- Owner: City of Walla Walla; Walla Walla School District; Whitman College
- Capacity: 2,376
- Surface: Natural grass
- Field size: LF: 315 ft (96 m); LC: 353 ft (108 m); CF: 410 ft (125 m); RC: 378 ft (115 m); RF: 333 ft (101 m)

Construction
- Opened: 1926; 100 years ago

Tenants
- Walla Walla Sweets (2010–present); Blue Mountain Bears (1983); Walla Walla Phillies (1970–1971); Walla Walla Islanders (1972); Walla Walla Padres (1973–1982); Whitman College baseball (1940–present); Whitman College football (1926–1976); Walla Walla Community College football Walla Walla High School baseball Walla Walla HS football (1975–2024)

Borleske Stadium is a multi-purpose outdoor athletic stadium in Walla Walla, Washington. Opened 100 years ago in 1926, it has served as the home for a variety of professional and amateur teams in both football and baseball.

The stadium is named for Vincent Borleske (1887–1957), a Whitman College athlete (class of 1910) and coach.

The stadium is part of a sports complex alongside Martin Field and Memorial Pool. It is the home venue of the Whitman College baseball team and the Walla Walla Sweets of the West Coast League. Following the baseball season, the stadium is transitioned to be the home of Walla Walla High School football. The elevation of the field is approximately 980 feet (300 m) above sea level.

== Layout ==
The layout of Borleske Stadium is like most minor league ballparks, although it is unconventionally oriented southeast; the recommended alignment is east-northeast. In August, the field is transitioned for football with the pitcher's mound removed and sod placed over the infield. The sideline of the field runs parallel with the right field foul line. The entrance gate is located beyond right field and is utilized for baseball and football.

=== Field Boxes ===
Six field boxes were added right along the fence along the first base line. Each field box holds 10 seats and every two boxes are served by a stadium waiter. The first three boxes include protective netting, being very close to the game play. All six boxes come with drink/snack trays and daily, complimentary Sweets programs, with a Budweiser scorecard and the daily Sherwin Williams Borleske Bulletin.

=== Diamond/Premier Seats ===
The Diamond (AA & BB) and Premier (CC & DD) seating sections are located directly behind home plate. A total of 252 stadium-style seats were added, 14 of which are Physically Disabled Accessible along with 14 companion seats. The premier seats come with waiter service.

=== The Sweets Shoppe ===
The Sweets Shoppe at Borleske Stadium is a fully functioning point of sale for all Sweets' merchandise, hats, clothing and apparel. It opens one hour before the first pitch and closes during the 9th inning on a daily basis. The Sweets Shoppe is located on the main concourse directly across from the Concessions Stand.

=== Concessions Stand ===
The complete overhaul of the Borleske Stadium Concessions Stand included a new range and freezer/refrigeration system, a new three-section sink for proper cleaning, a new floor, new walls, and three new points of sale to allow customers to move in and out of the concessions area quickly.

=== The Sweet Spot ===
Located down the right-field line, nestled up against the visiting bullpen is the Sweet Spot presented by Key Technology. The Sweet Spot serves as a party deck for group ticket holders over 20 that elect for an all-you-can-eat BBQ starting a half-hour before gates open to the public and running up to first pitch. The Sweet Spot has a 100-person capacity and houses the Borleske Stadium covered grill.

=== Dugouts ===
The new and improved dugouts at Borleske Stadium are sunken into the ground and feature a double-deck seating area, the artificial surface at ground level to walk on and view the game, a storage area for helmets and bats and a protective netting that runs the length of each dugout to keep foul balls from screaming into the sitting area without obstructing the view from within.

=== Budweiser Beer Garden ===
Many adults at Borleske Stadium find their way down the left-field line to the Budweiser Beer Garden. The Bud Barn serves Budweiser products and local microbrews along with several local wines. It is a popular spectating area, providing umbrella-covered tables and chairs and starting in 2011, pub tables and bar stools.

== Former tenants ==
- Blue Mountain Bears (1983)
- Walla Walla Padres (1973–1982)
- Walla Walla Islanders (1972)
- Walla Walla Phillies (1970–1971)
- Walla Walla Bears (1969)
- Whitman College football
- Walla Walla High School baseball
- Walla Walla Community College football
- Walla Walla Phillies (1970, 1971)
- Walla Walla Padres (1973–1982)

== Current tenants ==
- Whitman College baseball
- Walla Walla Sweets
- Walla Walla High School football

== Notables who played at Borleske ==
- Kurt Russell (actor), with Walla Walla Islanders (1972)
- Ozzie Smith (MLB Hall of Famer), with Walla Walla Padres (1977)
- Tony Gwynn (MLB Hall of Famer), with Walla Walla Padres (1981)
- John Kruk (former MLB All-Star), with Walla Walla Padres (1981)
- Drew Bledsoe (NFL quarterback), first selection of the 1993 NFL draft, Walla Walla High School (class of 1990)
- Howie Bedell
- Bob Beall
- Dane Iorg
- Tom Trebelhorn
