= Western Tri-State League =

Professional baseball league

- Sport: Baseball
- Founded: 1912
- First season: 1912
- Folded: 1915
- President: W. N. Sweet (1912–13); R. W. Ritner (1914)
- No. of teams: 4–6
- Country: United States (Oregon, Idaho, and Washington )
- Last champions: Pendleton Buckaroos (1912, 1914); Walla Walla Bears (1913^{1}); Boise Irrigators (1913^{2})

The Western Tri-State League was a professional baseball league, which was formed in 1912, and disbanded in 1914. It was a Class D league. Over its three-year existence, the league featured six teams from six different cities in Oregon, Idaho, and Washington. Two teams, the Pendleton Buckaroos, and the Walla Walla Bears, spent all three seasons in the league. The Pendleton Buckaroos won two league championships, the first coming in 1912, and the other in 1914. The Walla Walla Bears won the first-half league championship in 1913, while the Boise Irrigators were the second half champions. In 1913, the league opened with six teams, two more than the previous year. However, early into the league, two teams were dropped due to financial strains. In 1915, the league folded. Initially, it was attributed to financial difficulties. However, it was later said to be issues with the relations of team owners.

== League history ==
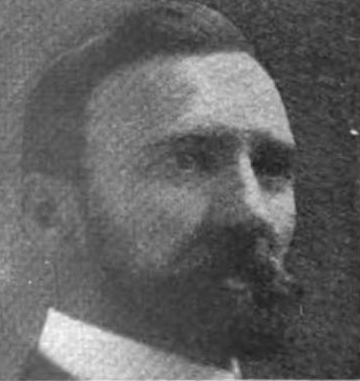
W. N. Sweet served as the president of the Western Tri-State League for two years (1912–13).

=== 1912 season ===
In 1912, the Western Tri-State League was recognized by the National Association of Professional Baseball Leagues, and classified as a Class D league. The league president was W. N. Sweet. The league opened with four teams: the Boise Irrigators, who represented Boise, Idaho; the La Grande Pippins, who represented La Grande, Oregon; the Pendleton Buckaroos, who represented Pendleton, Oregon; and the Walla Walla Bears, who represented Walla Walla, Washington. At the end of the 1912 season, the Pendleton Buckaroos won the league championship with a .622 winning percentage. Four players in the Western Tri-State League that season would eventually go on to play in Major League Baseball. Those players were Bob Smith, and Carl Mays of the Boise Irrigators; and Bob Jones, and Paul Strand of the Walla Walla Bears.

=== 1913 season ===
At the start of the 1913 season, it was announced that there would be an addition of two teams to the Western Tri-State League. Those teams were the Baker City Golddiggers, of Baker City, Oregon; and the North Yakima Braves, of Yakima, Washington. Furthermore, the La Grande club changed their name from the Pippins to the Spuds. The league had considered adding a team in Spokane, Washington, but ruled it out until the 1914 season. W. N. Sweet returned as the league president. Early in the year, it was announced that two teams would be dropped from the league, to make it more economically effective to run the circuit. The teams that were cut were the newly formed Baker City Golddiggers, and the established Pendleton Buckaroos. In May, it was announced by league officials that the league's season would be split up into two halves. The intention of this move was to stimulate interests, and lower the cost of operation.

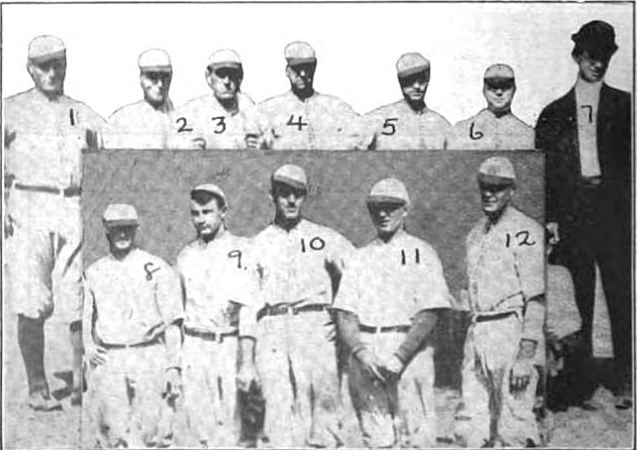
The Walla Walla Bears won the 1913 Western Tri-State League Pennant.

The Walla Walla Bears finished the first half of the season in first place with a record of 45–20. They were followed by the Boise Irrigators (40–23) in second, the Pendleton Buckaroos in third (31–29), and the North Yakima Braves (30–34) in fourth. During the second half of the season, the Boise club took home the pennant, finishing with a 32–22 record. They were followed by the second-place North Yakima club (27–27), the third-place Walla Walla club (26–28), and the fourth-place Pendleton club (23–31). Eight players who spent the 1913 season in the Western Tri-State League played in Major League Baseball. Those players were Con Starkel of the Baker City club; Dad Clark, and Steve Melter of the Boise club; Milo Netzel of the North Yakima club; Howie Haworth, and Don Rader of the Pendleton club; and Elmer Leonard, and Earl Sheely of the Walla Walla club.

=== 1914 season, and disbanding ===
Before the start of the 1914 season, it was announced that the Boise Irrigators were leaving the Western Tri-State League, and joining the Union Association. Therefore, W. N. Sweet, the president of the league, and president of the Boise club resigned his post. Before the start of the season, L. M. Brown, the secretary of the Western Tri-State League, announced that the league would be adopting a 98-game schedule, and that they would be adding another team due to the absence of Boise. Over a dozen requests were sent to secretary Brown requesting a baseball team. Brown selected Baker City, Oregon as the location for the new franchise.

Local reports speculated that the 1914 season would be the league's most successful. In Walla Walla, Washington, the cities public schools were dismissed early, and admitted to the Walla Walla Bears game for free. There was also a parade, which led to the ball park. Attendance for all of the clubs opening day games were record-breaking that year. The Pendleton Walla Walla, Washington Minor League City Encyclopedia won the league title that season with a 59–37 record. In second place were the Walla Walla Bears with a record of 53–43. Behind them were the Baker City Miners with a 44–52 record. The North Yakima Braves, with a record of 36–50, finished last. Four players in the league that season had an MLB appearance some time in their professional career. Those players were: Ray French, and Suds Sutherland of the Baker City club; Ed Mensor of the Pendleton club; and Earl Sheely of the Walla Walla club.

Before the start of the 1915 season, the Western Tri-State League failed to raise enough money to operate their league, effectively ending the league. League president Roy W. Ritner later stated that the failure of the league was due to the North Yakama, and Walla Walla clubs who did not want to work together.

== Teams ==
Team	City/Area	Founded	Years	Notes
Baker City Golddiggers/Miners	Baker City, OR	1913	1913–14	
Boise Irrigators	Boise, ID	1911	1912–13	
La Grande Pippins/Spuds	La Grande, Oregon	1912	1912–13	
North Yakima Braves	Yakima, WA	1913	1913–14	
Pendleton Buckaroos	Pendleton, Oregon	1912	1912–14	
Walla Walla Bears	Walla Walla, WA	1912	1912–14	
