= Pacific Interstate League =

Minor league baseball league

- Classification: Independent (1891)
- Sport: Minor League Baseball
- First season: 1891
- Folded: 1891
- Replaced by: Inland Empire League
- President: Unknown (1891)
- No. of teams: 4
- Country: United States of America
- Most titles: 1 La Grande Grand Rhonders (1891)

The Pacific Interstate League was a minor league baseball league that played in the 1891 season. The four–team Independent level league consisted of teams based in Oregon and Washington. The Pacific Interstate League permanently folded following the 1891 season, later succeeded by the Inland Empire League, featuring the same four franchises.

== History ==
The four host cities first formed together as the Pacific Interstate League of 1891. The Independent level league comprised the Baker Bunch Grassers, La Grande Grand Rhonders, Pendleton Ho Hos and Walla Walla Walla Wallas.

On June 6, 1891, the Pacific Interstate League began league play. The La Grande Grand Rhonders won the championship with a 20–10 record, finishing 2.0 games ahead of the next team in the final standings. La Grande was followed by the second place Pendleton Giants/Ho Hos (18–12), third place Walla Walla Walla Wallas (16–14) and fourth place Baker Bunch Grassers (6–24) in the final Pacific Interstate League standings. Ending the season schedule on September 14, 1891, the league did not return to play in 1892 and permanently folded.

Eleven years after the Pacific Interstate League folded as a minor league, the same four cities reformed as the 1902 Inland Empire League, a Class D level league. The Baker City Gold Diggers, La Grande Beetpullers, Pendleton Indians and Walla Walla Sharpshooters were the 1902 members.

== Pacific Interstate League teams ==
Team name	City represented	Ballpark	Year(s) active
Baker City Bunch Grassers	Baker City, Oregon	Unknown	1891
La Grande Grand Rhonders	La Grande, Oregon	Unknown	1891
Pendleton Ho Hos	Pendleton, Oregon	Round–Up Park	1891
Walla Walla Walla Wallas	Walla Walla, Washington	Unknown	1891

== League standings ==
=== 1891 Pacific Interstate League ===
Team standings	W	L	PCT	GB	Managers
La Grande Grand Rhonders	20	10	.667	–	A. Miller
Pendleton Ho Hos	18	12	.600	2	Andrew Tully
Walla Walla Walla Wallas	16	14	.533	4	Skyrocket Smith
Baker City Bunch Grassers	6	24	.200	14	W.S. Bowers
