= Jamal Strong =

American baseball player (born 1978)

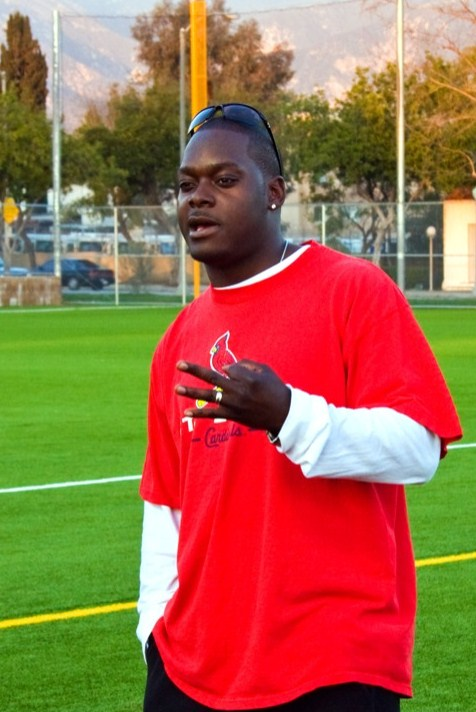
- Strong in 2010
- Outfielder
- Born: August 5, 1978 (age 47); Pasadena, California, U.S.
- Batted: Right Threw: Right

MLB debut
- September 2, 2003, for the Seattle Mariners

Last MLB appearance
- September 11, 2005, for the Seattle Mariners

MLB statistics
- Batting average: .227
- Home runs: 0
- Runs batted in: 2
- Stats at Baseball Reference

Teams
- Seattle Mariners (2003, 2005)

Jamal Najar Strong (born August 5, 1978) is an American former professional baseball outfielder who played for the Seattle Mariners of Major League Baseball (MLB) in 2003 and 2005.

Strong played college baseball for Citrus Community College and the Nebraska Cornhuskers.

The Mariners selected Strong in the sixth round of the 2000 MLB draft. He was a minor league All-Star in 2000 and 2001 and was the co-MVP of the Northeast League in 2000. He made his major league debut in 2003 and was called up again in 2005. In 28 MLB games, he hit .227. He dealt with injuries in the majors, with a dislocated shoulder in spring training in 2003, a right knee injury in 2004 that required surgery, and a broken bone in his left hand after being hit by a pitch in September 2005.

On April 26, 2005, Strong became the fourth baseball player to be suspended for testing positive on illegal performance-enhancing drugs under MLB's new drug policy. He was suspended for 10 days without pay as the policy dictated for a first offense.

Strong became a free agent after the 2005 season and signed with the Chicago Cubs in January 2006. The Cubs released him on April 25, and he signed with the Atlanta Braves on April 28. Atlanta released him on October 15. He signed with the Boston Red Sox in January 2007 but was released in March. He later signed with the New York Yankees in 2007.

Strong played for the Long Island Ducks of the independent Atlantic League in 2008. On June 6, the Ducks traded him to the Camden Riversharks for pitcher Abe Alvarez, but Strong did not play for Camden.

== See also ==
- List of sportspeople sanctioned for doping offences
