= Luis Durango =

Panamanian baseball player (born 1986)

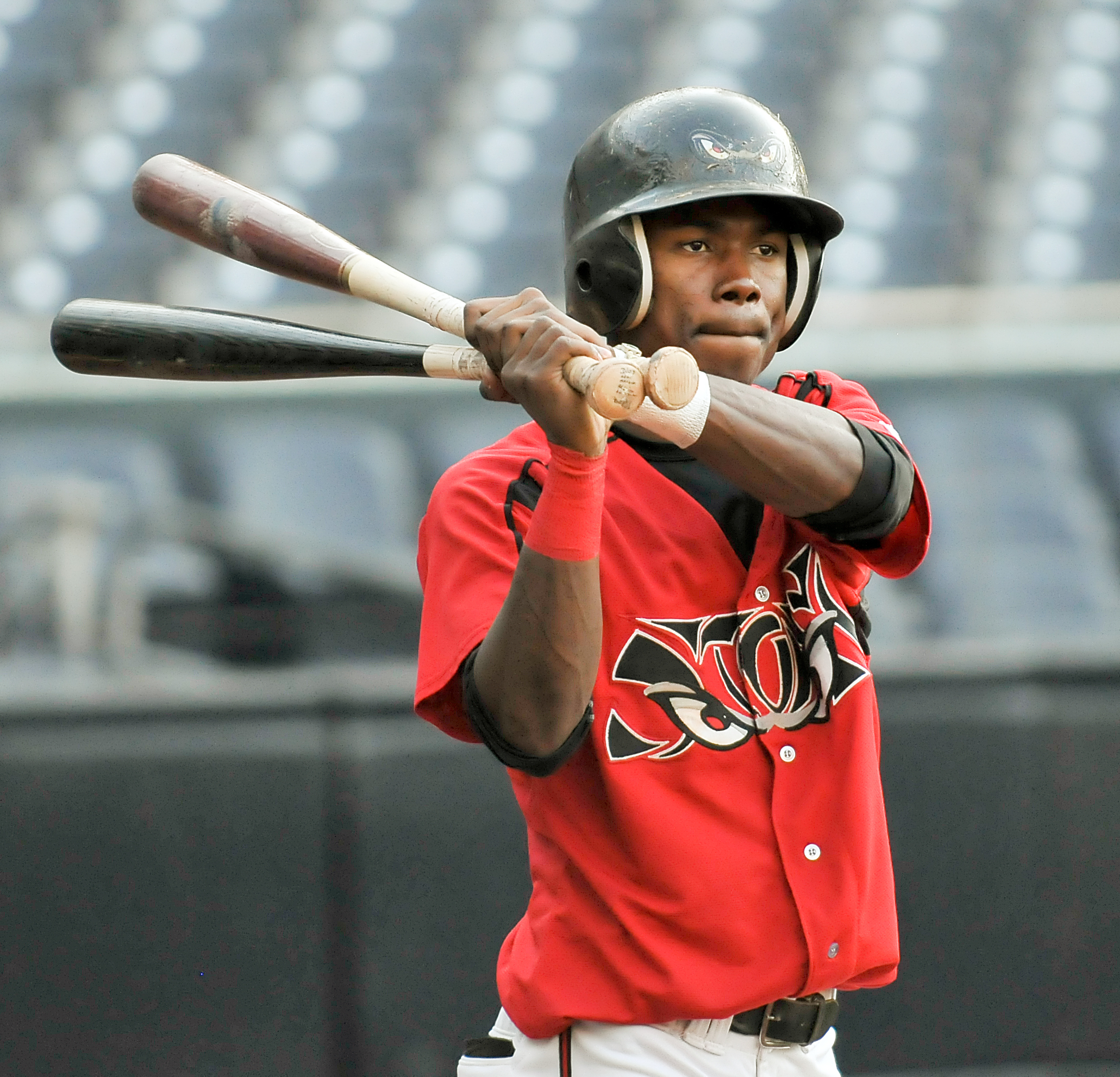
- Durango in 2008
- Outfielder
- Born: April 23, 1986 (age 40); Panama City, Panama
- Batted: Switch Threw: Right

MLB debut
- September 15, 2009, for the San Diego Padres

Last MLB appearance
- August 2, 2011, for the Houston Astros

MLB statistics
- Batting average: .292
- Stolen bases: 7
- Runs batted in: 5
- Stats at Baseball Reference

Teams
- San Diego Padres (2009–2010); Houston Astros (2011)

Luis A. Durango (born April 23, 1986) is a Panamanian former professional baseball outfielder. He played in Major League Baseball (MLB) for the San Diego Padres and Houston Astros and was also a member of the Panama national baseball team.

Durango was born in Panama City. In 2006, he was clocked at 3.4 seconds from home plate to first base on a bunt. Durango made his professional debut that same year, playing for the San Diego Padres Rookie-level affiliate. He was named an Arizona League All–Star for his performances that season. He spent all of 2007 with the Eugene Emeralds of the Northwest League in Low-A, later being named the Co–Most Valuable Player of the league. In 2008, he split time between Class-A, with the Fort Wayne Wizards, and High-A, with the Lake Elsinore Storm, before being added to the Padres' 40-man roster after the season. Durango began 2009 with the San Antonio Missions in Double-A, but ended up working his way up to the majors, making his debut with the Padres on September 15. He recorded his first career hit the following day. He split 2010 between Triple-A Portland and the Padres, playing in a combined 134 games. To begin 2011, Durango played for the Padres new Triple-A affiliate in Tucson before being designated for assignment in late June. He was later claimed off waivers by the Houston Astros, but was later designated for assignment again.

== Professional career ==
=== San Diego Padres ===
He made his minor league baseball debut in 2006, and spent the year with the Arizona League Padres, hitting for a .378 batting average and stealing 17 bases in 39 games. His batting average was the highest of any hitter in at the Rookie-level. He was named to the Arizona League All–Star team after the season, along with teammates Cedric Hunter and Rayner Contreras. After the season, the Padres reportedly considered Durango to be one of the better prospects in their organization.

In 2007, Durango spent the year with the Eugene Emeralds, playing in 69 games, hitting .367 with 17 stolen bases. He also hit two home runs, one of which was a walk-off against the Yakima Bears on July 7. During the year, he had a 19-game hitting streak that was broken up on August 2, against the Salem-Keizer Volcanoes. He was named Co–Most Valuable Player of the Northwest League after the season. Following the season, Durango joined the Tigres de Cartagena of the Colombian Professional Baseball League for the upcoming season, which plays during the MLB off-season. In Cartagena, he was named to the All–Star team.

Durango started the 2008 season with the Fort Wayne Wizards of the Midwest League, playing in 93 games for the club and hitting .305 with 14 steals. He remained with Fort Wayne until August 12, when he was called up to the Lake Elsinore Storm, San Diego's High–A affiliate. In his second game with the Storm, he tallied three hits, helping the team to a 16–4 win over the Inland Empire 66ers. He finished the year with a .431 batting average in 17 games with the Storm. Following the season, he joined the Algodoneros de Guasave of the Mexican Pacific League after Kit Pellow, a first baseman, was kicked off the team. He hit his first home run for Guasave on December 6, helping them to a 3–2 win. Three days later, the Padres added him to their 40-man roster, in order to protect him from being selected in the Rule 5 draft.

Prior to the 2009 season, Grady Fuson, the Padres vice president of scouting and player development, said about Durango, "He's our little Juan Pierre. He can absolutely fly. And he's really mastered, in the last couple of years, the ability to get the bat on the ball and keep it out of the air." Durango began the season with the Double-A San Antonio Missions. At the All–Star break, he was batting .319, with a league leading 26 steals, 43 walks, and 46 runs. He was named a starter for the All–Star game. Durango also represented Team World at the All-Star Futures Game, going 1–for–2 with one stolen base. On August 19, the managers of the teams in the Texas League named him the fastest baserunner in the league for the season. He was called up by the Padres on September 14, making his debut the next day as a pinch hitter against the Arizona Diamondbacks, going 0–for–1. The next day, he recorded three hits, two of which were bunt singles, and also stole his first base in the Major leagues. After the game, Diamondbacks catcher Miguel Montero said about Durango, "He [Durango] played the game with us however he wanted to. He never hit the ball out of the infield and got three hits. I know he's fast and has good speed, but we should have played him a little better." On October 4, 2009, Durango got a bunt hit in the bottom of the 7th against future Hall of Famer Randy Johnson. It was the last hit Johnson would give up in his career. In 129 games with San Antonio, he hit .281 with 44 stolen bases and 81 walks, while he had six hits in 14 at–bats with San Diego. Durango played with the Tigres de Licey of the Dominican Winter League after the season.

Durango spent Spring training 2010 with the Padres, before being sent down to Triple-A Portland on March 29. He was called up on May 25, replacing Luis Perdomo on the active roster. In his first game back with San Diego, he dropped fly ball from Skip Schumaker before throwing out Jon Jay at home plate later in the game. He went 1–for–5 batting in the league off spot. On June 2, after playing six games and hitting .385 with two runs batted in, he was optioned back to Portland with Scott Hairston taking his spot on the roster. The Padres called him back up on July 16, after they placed Mike Adams on the disabled list, but he was sent back down a week later. For the third time that season, San Diego called Durango up to the major leagues on August 21, however, he was sent back down again a week later. Once Portland's season was over, he was recalled by the Padres. In 106 games with Portland, Durango hit .300 with 42 runs scored and 35 stolen bases. In just 48 at–bats, he hit .250 with five stolen bases and eight runs scored. Following the season, he joined the Bravos de Margarita of the Venezuelan Professional Baseball League, but injured his wrist in early December.

Durango started off the 2011 season with the newly relocated Tucson Padres, hitting for a .243 batting average with 10 stolen bases in 61 games before he was designated for assignment on June 21, making room for Josh Spence on the 40-man roster.

=== Houston Astros ===
Durango was claimed off waivers by the Houston Astros on June 29, and assigned to the Triple-A Oklahoma City RedHawks. After the trades of Hunter Pence and Michael Bourn, the Astros recalled Durango from Triple-A on July 31. In 25 games with the RedHawks, he collected 22 hits for a .278 batting average and stole 13 bases. He made his Astros debut on August 1 against the Cincinnati Reds, going 0–for–2 with a walk. The following game, he got his first hit for the Astros, driving in a run. He was optioned back to Triple-A on August 3. On August 5, to make room for J. B. Shuck on the 40-man roster, Durango was designated for assignment by the Astros. After he cleared waivers, he was outrighted back to Triple-A. He became a free agent at season's end.

=== Atlanta Braves ===
Durango signed a minor league contract with the Atlanta Braves on November 22, 2011. He also received an invitation to spring training.

=== Kansas City Royals ===
On November 9, 2012, he signed a minor league contract with the Kansas City Royals. He was released on April 1, 2013.

=== Chicago White Sox ===
Durango signed a minor league contract with the Chicago White Sox on April 3 and began the 2013 season with the Triple-A Charlotte Knights. He was released on May 11, 2013.

=== Cincinnati Reds ===
On May 13, 2013, Durango signed a minor league contract with the Cincinnati Reds organization. On June 28, 2013, Durango was released.

=== Rojos del Águila de Veracruz ===
On July 6, 2013, Durango signed with the Rojos del Águila de Veracruz of the Mexican League.

In 2014, he played with the Los Diablos de Hermosillo in the Northern Mexico League.

=== Olmecas de Tabasco ===
On February 7, 2015, Durango signed with the Olmecas de Tabasco in the Mexican League. He completed the season with a .304 batting average, 35 stolen bases and won the Golden Glove Award ending the season with a .995 percentage in the Outfield.

On April 12, 2016, Durango was released by the Olmecas de Tabasco.

=== Sioux City Explorers ===
On March 1, 2018, Durango signed with the Sioux City Explorers of the independent American Association.

=== Quebec Capitales ===
On January 17, 2019, Durango was traded to the Quebec Capitales of the Can-Am League.

== International career ==
On January 19, 2009, Durango was added to Panama's provisional roster for the 2009 World Baseball Classic. He was eventually named to Panama's final roster. He saw limited action for Panama in the tournament, tallying just three hits in five at-bats, with two of those hits coming in Panama's 9–0 loss to the Dominican Republic on March 9.

In 2019, he was selected for Panama at the 2019 Pan American Games Qualifier.
