= Walla Walla Sweets =

Baseball team in Walla Walla, Washington

- Logo

Information
- League: West Coast League (South)
- Location: Walla Walla, Washington
- Ballpark: Borleske Stadium
- Founded: 2009
- League championships: 0
- Division championships: 1 (2011)
- Colors: Navy, red, gold, white
- Mascot: Sweet Lou
- Ownership: Pacific Baseball Ventures, LLC
- Management: Cody Miller
- Manager: Leo Rivera

The Walla Walla Sweets is an amateur baseball team located in Walla Walla, Washington. They play in the West Coast League, a collegiate summer baseball league. Walla Walla calls Borleske Stadium home which has a capacity of 2,378 spectators.

The Sweets made their first and only WCL Championship appearance in 2011 in their second year of fielding a team. The team's greatest finish came two years later when the Sweets compiled a 31-22 record. The team has struggled to find success since 2013 with only four winning seasons (2014, 2016, 2018 & 2019) and one playoff win (2019).

== History ==
=== 2010 season ===
The Sweets were an expansion team for the 2010 season. They set a WCL record for attendance in their first season, drawing 40,461 fans during 28 home games in 2010 (34,824 during league games), ranking #23 in the country in overall attendance. Four Sweets gained league recognition, with catcher Elliot Stewart (Cal Poly) being named to the second team All-WCL and pitcher Joey Wagman (Cal Poly), SS Kevin Kuntz (Kansas) and 1B/OF Dennis Holt (UCLA) being named to the honorable mention All-WCL team. GM Zachary Fraser was named the 2010 WCL Executive of the Year.

=== 2011 season ===
After a last-place finish in the WCL East Division in 2010, the Sweets made significant changes to their roster, specifically bolstering the pitching rotation (a major concern after the inaugural campaign). Opening the season against Corvallis, the Sweets took 2-of-3 at home from the Knights, but the Sweets struggled for the next month. By July 15, the team was in third place in the East, trailing the Bellingham Bells by five games for the wild-card spot with only three weeks left in the regular season. The Sweets then became one of the hottest teams in the WCL, turned around their season and caught the Bells in the last week of the season to earn the WCL East wild-card spot with a 26-28 league record. With the WCL's second-best pitching staff and an improved offense, the Sweets shocked the league by sweeping Wenatchee (who were ranked #3 in the country and had won the regular season division title by 13 games over Walla Walla) two games to none in the division series, winning the WCL East Division as a wild card and earning a spot in the WCL Championship Series. The Sweets magic ran out, as the Knights swept the Sweets. However, the club saw major improvements over the first season. The team had the league MVP in 2011, 2B/SS Alex Stanford of Gonzaga, who also broke the league record for hits in a season (setting the new mark at 66). In addition to once again being a league leader in attendance (ranking #21 in the country, up from #23 and drawing over 54,000 fans), the team placed 6 players on the WCL East All-Star team (C Elliot Stewart, 2B/SS Alex Stanford, OF Andrew Mendenhall, and pitchers Ryan Richardson, Tim Culligan and Brett Watson), as well as the following recognitions for all-WCL performance: Alex Stanford (1st Team All-WCL), Andrew Mendenhall (2nd Team All-WCL), RHP Tim Culligan (2nd Team All-WCL), C Elliot Stewart (Honorable Mention All-WCL), RHP Ryan Richardson (Honorable Mention All-WCL), and LHP Brett Watson (Honorable Mention All-WCL). Richardson led the league in ERA with a 1.53 mark in 53 IP.

=== Traditions started in 2011 ===
The 2011 Sweets established a tradition that became a rallying call for the season. In the eighth inning, the club would play "Love is Gone" by David Guetta over the sound system. 1,600 fans would get into a frenzy as the players would start to dance in rhythm to the song in the dugout. The team went on to win five games in which they were trailing after the 7th inning, the most in the WCL in 2011. Another tradition that became a fan favorite as the Sweets made their late-season push to the playoffs was the iconic call of broadcaster Tristan Hobbes calling with joy "The Sweets Win! How Sweet it is! ", while another favorite was his "Simon Says...Game Over!" call as closer Simon Anderson (North Dakota State) would finish off the game with a save.

=== 2012 season ===
Despite high expectations heading into the season, in 2012 the Sweets didn't do as well as the year before. After an opening night sellout that saw streakers invade Borleske Stadium, the club struggled in the first few weeks of the season, and never climbed back out of the hole created. They finished last in their division, with a record of 24-30 they finished 8th overall. They did host the 2012 WCL All-Star Game with great success, and once again drew over 45,000 fans to Borleske Stadium. After the 2012 season, manager J.C. Biagi was promoted to Assistant GM, and general manager Zachary Fraser added the role of vice-president of Pacific Baseball Ventures to his title.

=== 2013 season ===
2013 saw a Sweets club that stayed close to the top of the re-aligned North Division from start to finish, eventually clinching the club's first-ever WCL Division Pennant. The season got started with a bang, as the Sweets hosted a Walla Walla Police vs. Fire baseball battle to raise money for local charities. The Battle of the Badge raised $24,000 for local non-profits, and the success of that first night was a harbinger of what was to come. During the season, a tight pennant race ensued between Bellingham, Wenatchee and the Sweets, each taking turns at the top of the standings. The Sweets were led by an astounding nine All-Stars (6 pitchers, 3 position players) who represented Walla Walla in Victoria during the WCL All-Star Game: C Renae Martinez (UC-Irvine), OF Kramer Lindell (Linfield), 1B Matt Mendenhall (WSU), whose older brother Andrew had represented the Sweets in the ASG in 2011, and the following pitchers: Sean-Luke Brija (Gonzaga), Matt Hall (Missouri State), Sean Silva (USC), Chris Lovejoy (Ball State), Cody Poteet (UCLA), and Bret Helton (Utah). Helton was selected as the starter for the North in the All-Star Game, and Poteet was named the top prospect by the MLB Scouting Bureau. The Sweets made their run after the All-Star Game, going 11-5 to finish the season (winning a team-record eight in a row to close out the regular season), sweeping the Bend Elks in Bend to knock of the Wenatchee AppleSox (2012 pennant winners). The Sweets would face off against the AppleSox in the division series, a re-match of the 2011 playoffs. This time around, the Sox were the wildcard winners, and ultimately the victors, as Wenatchee advanced to the WCL Championship Series. The Sweets would finish the regular season 37-22 (31-22 in WCL league play), their best-ever record. Accolades on the season would include the 9 All-Stars, a ranking of #41 in the Perfect Game National Top 50 of Summer Collegiate teams, again ranking among the top 50 markets in the nation in attendance, and for the second consecutive year, counting a Sweet as the best MLB prospect in the game as named by Baseball America and Perfect Game (Poteet/UCLA). Closer Brija tied a WCL record for saves in a season (13) and joined teammates Hall and Silva as First-Team All-WCL performers.

=== 2014 season ===
The Walla Walla Sweets went 28-26 in the 2014 season. They missed the playoffs by 2 games to the Yakima Valley Pippins. After a five year run that included winning the Eastern division twice and one appearance in the WCL Championships, as well as impacting the community in so many ways through camps, business connections and leadership programs for children manager J.C. Biagi and pitching coach Mark Michaud stepped down. Biagi went to pursue other interests, while Michaud still lives in Walla Walla and is a full-time teacher in Milton Freewater where he also coaches boys basketball at McCloughlin High School. During the off-season, the Sweets hired Frank Mutz, former MLB pitcher, as the new head coach for 2015. The sweets averaged 1,188 fans a night drawing in 36,823 fans in 31 regular season games.

=== 2023 ===
On July 10, outfielder Ben Parker (William & Mary) was named Player of the week.

The Sweets finished the season tied with the Pippins for last place in the South Division with a 20-34 record. Parker lead the league with a .366 batting average while fellow outfielder Aidan Espinoza (UCLA) finished with a .331 batting average. On the mound, Zachary Hangas (Ottawa) finished with an ERA of 3.88. 28,041 fans attended Walla Walla's twenty-seven home games for an average of 1,039 fans per game.

The Sweets failed to make the playoffs for the third straight season.

=== 2024 ===
On July 1st, Zachary Hangas (Ottawa University) was named the league's pitcher of the week. Hangas threw two strikeouts and allowed zero walks to pick up a shutout win over the NorthPaws.

On July 9th, Kolby Felix, Liam Hohenstein, and Davis Mauzy were selected to represent the Sweets in the 2024 All Star Game in Bellingham.

The Sweets failed to qualify for the playoffs for the fourth straight season.

=== 2025 ===
On June 9th, Tanner Kern (Sacramento State) was named Player of the Week.

Kern, Dominic Cadiz (UCLA) and Gunner Geile (Arizona) were selected to represent the Sweets at the All Star Game in Bellingham on July 8th.

The Sweets improved on their 20-33 record from the previous season. The team went 24-30 and finished fifth in the South Division. 28,244 total fans attended the Sweets' twenty-seven home games for an average of 1,046 fans per game.

The Sweets were eliminated from playoff contention for the fifth straight season (not counting 2020).

=== Results by Season ===
Season	League	Division	Finish	W	L	Win%	GB	Postseason	Manager
2010	WCL	East	4th	18	30	.375	11	Did Not Qualify	J.C. Biagi
2011	WCL	East	2nd	26	28	.481	13	Won Division Series 2-0 (Wenatchee); Lost Championship Series 0-2 (Corvallis)	J.C. Biagi
2012	WCL	East	4th	24	30	.444	13	Did Not Qualify	J.C. Biagi
2013	WCL	North	1st	31	22	.585	0	Lost Division Series 0-2 (Wenatchee)	J.C. Biagi
2014	WCL	East	3rd	28	26	.519	7	Did Not Qualify	J.C. Biagi
2015	WCL	East	4th	22	31	.415	12	Did Not Qualify	Frank Mutz
2016	WCL	North	3rd	30	24	.556	10	Did Not Qualify	Frank Mutz
2017	WCL	North	5th	25	29	.463	6	Did Not Qualify	Frank Mutz
2018	WCL	South	3rd	28	26	.519	9	Did Not Qualify	Frank Mutz
2019	WCL	South	2nd	30	23	.566	11.5	Lost Division Series 1-2 (Corvallis)	Frank Mutz
2020	Season cancelled (COVID-19 pandemic)								
2021	WCL	North	4th	15	33	.313	14	Did Not Qualify	Larry Price
2022	WCL	South	7th	23	31	.426	16	Did Not Qualify	Brandon Van Horn
2023	WCL	South	8th	20	34	.370	19	Did Not Qualify	Jarrod Molnoa
2024	WCL	South	7th	20	33	.377	20.5	Did Not Qualify	Jarrod Molnoa
2025	WCL	South	6th	24	30	.444	19	Did Not Qualify	Colby Watilo
2026	WCL	South	3rd	31	23	.574	0	Lost South Division Series 1-2 (Corvallis)	Leo Rivera

League champions	Division champions	Playoff Team

=== Media ===
Walla Walla Sweets games are broadcast live on YouTube and Mixlr.com. In 2025, Drew Albaugh became the play-by-play announcer and is the media relations liaison for the team.

=== Notable players ===
Jarren Duran

Chris Murphy

Darius Vines

Easton Lucas

Vinny Capra

Garrett Mitchell

Sean Bouchard

Cooper Hummel
