= Walla Walla Phillies =

- (1970-1971); Walla Walla, Washington

Minor league affiliations
- Class: Class A Short Season (1970–1971)
- League: Northwest League (1970–1971)
- Division: North (1970–1971)

Major league affiliations
- Team: Philadelphia Phillies (1970–1971)

Minor league titles
- League titles: None
- Division titles: None

Team data
- Colors: Crimson, white
- Ballpark: Borleske Stadium (1970–1971)
- Owner/ Operator: Verne Russell
- General manager: Bob Dyer
- Manager: Gary Powel

The Walla Walla Phillies were a minor league baseball team in the northwest United States, located in Walla Walla, Washington. Named after their parent club, the Phillies were members of the Class A short-season Northwest League for two seasons from 1970 to 1971.

== History ==
In 1969, with the expansion of Major League Baseball, Walla Walla was awarded a Northwest League franchise. The franchise secured a working agreement with the Philadelphia Phillies of the National League. The club played their inaugural season as the Walla Walla Bears. In January 1970, the franchise was sold to Verne Russell. Building upon local ownership, the club stayed close to home in selecting its new general manager. Bob Dyer, who had played and managed the semi-professional Walla Walla Bears, was tabbed to head the front office.

Russell announced that Walla Walla and the Phillies would continue their relationship. At the behest of Philadelphia, the club dropped the Bears moniker to become the Walla Walla Phillies.

The Phillies finished the year at 39–41, placing second in the north division standings. Walla Walla led the league in attendance with over thirty-two thousands passing through the gates at Borleske Stadium.

Walla Walla continued their relationship with Philadelphia in 1971. Gary Powel returned as manager. The Phillies finished with a record of 47–32 only to be bested by the Tri-City Padres by two and a half games in the final standings. Following the season Philadelphia elected to move their short season affiliate closer to home, linking up with Auburn of the New York–Penn League. Walla Walla signed on with the Hawaii Islanders of the Triple-A Pacific Coast League and became the Walla Walla Islanders.

== The Ballpark ==
The Walla Walla Phillies played at Borleske Stadium, located at 409 West Rees Avenue in Walla Walla, Washington. The stadium is still in use today.

== Season-by-season record ==
| Season | PDC | Division | Finish | Wins | Losses | Win% | Postseason | Manager | Attendance |
|---|---|---|---|---|---|---|---|---|---|
Walla Walla Phillies
| 1970 | PHI | North | 2nd | 39 | 41 | .488 | | Gary Powel | 32,043 |
| 1971 | PHI | North | 2nd | 47 | 32 | .595 | | Gary Powel | 32,195 |

| Preceded by Walla Walla Bears | Northwest League franchise (1970-1971) | Succeeded by Walla Walla Islanders |
