= Walla Walla Islanders =

- (1972); Walla Walla, Washington

Minor league affiliations
- Previous classes: Class A-Short Season
- League: Northwest League
- Division: South

Minor league titles
- Division titles (1): 1972

Team data
- Colors: Red, navy blue, white
- Ballpark: Borleske Stadium
- Owner/ Operator: Verne Russell
- General manager: Bobby Dyer

The Walla Walla Islanders were a minor league baseball team in Walla Walla, Washington for a single season in 1972. The Islanders were members of the Class A short-season Northwest League and were an affiliate of the Triple-A Hawaii Islanders of the Pacific Coast League.

== History ==
Since its inception in 1969 the Walla Walla franchise had been affiliated with the Philadelphia Phillies. Following the 1972 season Philadelphia elected to move their short season affiliate closer to home, linking up with Auburn of the New York–Penn League. Triple-A Hawaii Islanders of the Pacific Coast League, whose parent club was the San Diego Padres, in a unique arrangement had their own minor league affiliate. The Islanders had operated the Bend Rainbows the past two seasons. With Walla Walla open the Islanders sought relocation to the golden hills of the Walla Walla Valley. Despite being hundreds of miles from the Pacific Ocean, the team would adopt their parent club's identity becoming the Walla Walla Islanders.

Walla Walla had a great start to the season. After compiling their fourth win in front of a record setting crowd, the team was the last undefeated in the league. The Islanders winning streak ended at ten games in a narrow 8-7 loss to Coos Bay-North Bend. Powered by the bats of third baseman Dean Joost and shortstop Jim Van Wyek, both name league all-stars, the team entered the finial week of the season on top of the division standings. With eight games left to play, Walla Walla trailed north division leading Lewiston by seven games. The Islanders dropped seven of the final eight games to finish with a record of 41-39. Despite the end of season skid, the Islanders won the south division title.

In addition to their connection with Hawaii, the team had ties to Hollywood. Actor Kurt Russell played second base for the Islanders. Russell appeared in twenty-nine games and posted a batting average of .325. Adding to the club's eclectic corps were two Japanese imports Jyoji Sekiguchi and Yuki Suzuki. Future Milwaukee Brewers and Chicago Cubs manager Tom Treblehorn played catcher along with Mike Rupcich. In addition to claiming a division title, Walla Walla set a franchise record for attendance with more than thirty-seven thousand fans entering the gates at Borleske Stadium. General Manager Bobby Dyer was awarded Northwest League General Manager of the Year.

The Hawaii Islanders struggled financially in operating a minor league team and were unable to adequately supply players. Furthermore, Hawaii sought to transition to a traditional AAA affiliate of the San Diego Padres, thus terminating their player development contract with Walla Walla. The San Diego elected to move their affiliation from Tri-City to Walla Walla. Adopting the moniker of their parent club, the Walla Walla Padres began play in 1973.

== Ballpark ==
Walla Walla teams played at Borleske Stadium, located at 409 West Rees Avenue in Walla Walla, Washington. The stadium is still in use today.

== Season-by-season record ==
Season	PDC	Division	Finish	Wins	Losses	Win%	Postseason	Manager	Attendance
Walla Walla Islanders
1971		South	1st	41	39	.513		Jack Spring	37,604

Division winner	League champions

Preceded by Walla Walla Phillies	Northwest League franchise (1972)	Succeeded by Walla Walla Padres
