= Inland Empire League =

Minor baseball league

- Formerly: Pacific Interstate League (1891)
- Classification: Class D (1902, 1908)
- Sport: Minor League Baseball
- First season: 1902
- Folded: July 12, 1908
- President: W.L. Thompson (1908)
- No. of teams: 4
- Country: United States of America
- Most titles: 1 Pendleton Indians (1902); La Grande Babes (1908)

The Inland Empire League was a Class D level minor league baseball league that played in the 1902 and 1908 seasons. The four–team Inland Empire League consisted of teams based in Oregon and Washington, with the same four cities hosting teams in both seasons. The Inland Empire League permanently folded during the 1908 season.

== History ==
The four Inland Empire League host cities first formed together in the Pacific Interstate League of 1891. The Independent level league comprised the Baker Bunch Grassers, La Grande Grand Rhonders, Pendleton Ho Hos and Walla Walla Walla Wallas.

The Inland Empire League began play in the 1902 season as a Class D level four–team league, with the Baker City Gold Diggers, La Grande Beetpullers, Pendleton Indians and Walla Walla Sharpshooters as charter members. The complete 1902 league standings and statistics are unknown. A game report noted Walla Walla defeated Baker 2–0 on July 25, 1902, in front of 300 fans at Baker. Another game report has Pendleton defeating La Grande 2–0 and Walla Walla defeating Baker 6–0 on August 25, 1902. It was also reported that the 1902 league folded a before the end of the scheduled season.

The team records on August 25, 1902 were reported to be: Pendleton 21–8, Walla Walla 14–15, La Grande 12–16 and Baker City 10–18.

After the 1902 league ended, it was reported some of the Inland Empire League players created a barnstorming team. Called the "Mormons" and based out of Salt Lake City, Utah, the team played games in Lincoln, Nebraska, where some of the players were signed by the Atlantic team from Atlantic, Iowa.

The Inland Empire League formed again in 1908, under the direction of league president W.L. Thompson, with the same four cities hosting franchises. The Baker Nuggets/Miners, La Grande Babes, Pendleton Pets/Wheat Growers and Walla Walla Walla Wallas began league play on June 10, 1908. However, the league permanently disbanded on Sunday, July 12, 1908 due to extreme heat.

At the time the league folded in 1908, the La Grande Babes, with a 19–12 record under manager O'Brien, were in first place, 2.5 games ahead of the second place Baker Nuggets/Miners, who finished with a record of 15–15. They were followed by the Walla Walla Walla Wallas (14–17) and Pendleton Pets/Wheat Growers (14–18) in the final standings. The Inland league did not return to play after the 1908 season.

== Inland Empire League teams ==
Team name	City represented	Ballpark	Year(s) active
Baker City Gold Diggers (1902); Baker Nuggets/Miners (1908)	Baker City, Oregon	Unknown	1902, 1908
La Grande Beetpullers (1902); La Grande Babes (1908)	La Grande, Oregon	Unknown	1902, 1908
Pendleton Indians (1902); Pendleton Pets/Wheat Growers (1908)	Pendleton, Oregon	Round-Up Park	1902, 1908
Walla Walla Sharpshooters (1902); Walla Walla Walla Wallas (1908)	Walla Walla, Washington	Unknown	1902, 1908

== Inland Empire League standings ==
1902 Inland Empire League
Team standings	W	L	PCT	GB	Managers
Pendleton Indians	21	8	.724	-	Cohen
Walla Walla Sharpshooters	14	15	.482	7	Sharpstein
La Grande Beetpullers	12	16	.428	8½	Walsh / Black / Ray
Baker City Gold Diggers	10	18	.357	10½	Bashe

1908 Inland Empire League
Team standings	W	L	PCT	GB	Managers
La Grande Babes	19	12	.631	-	O'Brien
Baker Nuggets/Miners	15	15	.500	3½	Cryderman / Tatum
Walla Walla Walla Wallas	14	17	.452	5	Rogers
Pendleton Pets/Wheat Growers	14	18	.438	5½	Lorimer / Hosier

== Notable alumni ==
George Stovall Pendleton (1902)
