= Suds Sutherland =

American baseball player (1894–1972)

Harvey "Suds" Sutherland
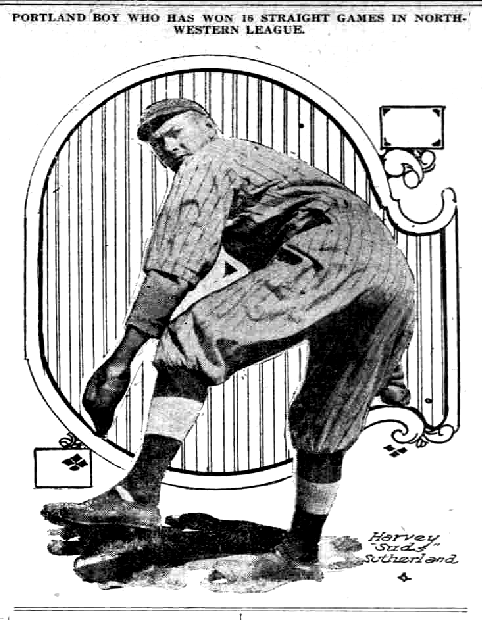
- Pitcher
- Born: February 20, 1894; Eugene, Oregon, U.S.
- Died: May 11, 1972 (aged 78); Portland, Oregon, U.S.
- Batted: Right Threw: Right

MLB debut
- April 14, 1921, for the Detroit Tigers

Last MLB appearance
- June 22, 1921, for the Detroit Tigers

MLB statistics
- Win–loss record: 6-2
- Earned run average: 4.97
- Batting average: .407
- Stats at Baseball Reference

Teams
- Detroit Tigers (1921)

Harvey Scott "Suds" Sutherland (February 20, 1894 – May 11, 1972) was a professional baseball player from 1914 to 1927. He played a portion of the 1921 season in Major League Baseball as a pitcher and outfielder for the Detroit Tigers. Sutherland compiled a 6–2 record and a .407 batting average with the Tigers. He also played for six seasons in the Pacific Coast League as a pitcher for the Portland Beavers (1919-1920, 1922–1923) and Seattle Indians (1924-1925), compiling an 81–84 record and a 3.38 earned run average (ERA).

== Minor leagues ==
Born in Beaverton, Oregon, Sutherland began his professional baseball career in 1914 with the Baker City Miners of the Western Tri-State League and the Edmonton Eskimos of the Western Canada League. He also played for the Tacoma Tigers in the Northwestern League in 1916 and 1917. During the 1919 and 1920 seasons, he played for the Portland Beavers in the Pacific Coast League. He had the best season of his career in 1920, compiling a 21–17 record with a 2.68 ERA in 45 games.

== Detroit Tigers ==
In 1921, he played in major leagues with the Detroit Tigers. Sutherland came to the Tigers during the spring of 1921, just as Ty Cobb was taking over as the team's manager. The 1921 Tigers had a team batting average of .316, but they were in dire need of pitching. Sutherland made his major league debut on April 14, 1921, and compiled a 6–2 record and 4.97 earned run average (ERA) in 13 games, eight as a starter. Sutherland compiled a .407 batting average in 29 at bats.

On June 12, 1921, Sutherland gave up a long home run to Babe Ruth, with the ball shooting into the upper deck. Cobb ran in from center field and took his anger out on the rookie pitcher. The Tigers' pitching staff gave up six home runs to the Babe during the four-game series with the New York Yankees, with only one of those being given up by Sutherland. Nevertheless, Sutherland took the brunt of Cobb's anger. Even though Sutherland had the team's best win-loss record at 6–2, Sutherland did not thereafter play for the Tigers, or in the major leagues, except for one inning of relief work and a pinch-hitting appearance.

== Return to minors ==
After his short stay with the Tigers, Sutherland returned to the Pacific Coast League where he played for the Portland Beavers (1922-1923) and Seattle Indians (1924-1925 and 1927). He pitched a total of six seasons and 221 games in the Pacific Coast League with a combined 81–84 record and 3.38 ERA.

Sutherland died in Portland, Oregon, in 1972 at age 78. He was buried at Pioneer Cemetery in Portland.
