= Everett Giants =

- 1984–1994; Everett, Washington

Minor league affiliations
- Class: Class A-Short Season
- League: Northwest League

Major league affiliations
- Previous teams: San Francisco Giants

Minor league titles
- League titles (1): 1985
- Division titles (2): 1985; 1987

Team data
- Colors: Black, orange, white
- Mascot: Frank the Hot Dog
- Ballpark: Everett Memorial Sports Complex

The Everett Giants were a minor league baseball team based in Everett, Washington, north of Seattle. The Giants were members of the Class A-Short Season Northwest League from 1984 through 1994 and were an affiliate of the San Francisco Giants.

== History ==
Following the 1983 season, Bob and Margaret Bavasi purchased the struggling Walla Walla-based Blue Mountain Bears. Antiquated facilities, compounded by dwindling attendance in Walla Walla, prompted the new owners to move the franchise. The Bavasis, who had secured affiliation with the San Francisco Giants, ultimately selected Everett as the relocation destination.

In their inaugural campaign, Everett went 36–38. The Giants, in their sophomore season, finished the year at 40–34 to claim the Washington division title and defeated the Eugene Emeralds in a one-game playoff to claim the Northwest League championship. Rounding out the honors of 1985, Bavasi won the league's executive of the year award. Two years later, the Giants won their second division title and faced East division champion Spokane Indians in the best-of-three championship series. Everett won the opener at home but dropped the next two in Spokane. The Giants sought to build upon their success, and posted a 42−34 record in 1988. Everett tied Spokane atop the North division standings, but under league tie-breaker rules, the Indians were declared division winners. The teams split their ten-game series, but the run total in those games was 66 to 65 in Spokane's favor.

Entering the new decade, the Giants struggled on the field. With the exception of 1993, when they were the division runner-up at 42–34 (.553), the Giants failed to post a winning record. The club continued their affiliation with the Giants until they signed a player development contract with the Seattle Mariners on September 12, 1994. The Mariners, who had been affiliated with Bellingham, essentially swapped with San Francisco as the Giants signed on with Bellingham. Upon affiliating with Seattle, the franchise selected a new team name, the Everett AquaSox, instead of taking the Mariners name.

== Season-by-season record ==
Season	PDC	Division	Finish	Wins	Losses	Win%	Postseason	Manager	Attendance
Everett Giants
1984	SFG	North	3rd	36	38	.486		Rocky Bridges	41,442
1985	SFG	Washington	1st	40	34	.541	Defeated Eugene in championship game	Joe Strain	53,869
1986	SFG	Washington	2nd	40	34	.541		Joe Strain	51,131
1987	SFG	West	1st	49	26	.653	Lost to Spokane in championship series 2-1	Joe Strain	58,823
1988	SFG	North	1st T	42	34	.553		Joe Strain	63,887
1989	SFG	North	4th	31	44	.413		Joe Strain	70,714
1990	SFG	South	3rd	35	41	.461		Deron McCue	74,577
1991	SFG	North	3rd	37	39	.487		Rob Ellis / Mike Bubalo	89,906
1992	SFG	North	3rd	35	41	.461		Norm Sherry	85,936
1993	SFG	North	2nd	42	34	.553		Norm Sherry	87,874
1994	SFG	North	2nd	37	39	.487		Mike Hart	94,421

Division winner	League champions

Source: Baseball Reference, MiLB.com

Preceded by Blue Mountain Bears	Northwest League franchise 1984–1994	Succeeded by Everett AquaSox
