= Walla Walla Padres =

- 1973–1982; Walla Walla, Washington

Minor league affiliations
- Class: Class A Short Season
- League: Northwest League
- Division: North (1977–1982); South (1975–1976); East (1974)

Major league affiliations
- Previous teams: San Diego Padres

Minor league titles
- League titles (2): 1973; 1976
- Division titles (4): 1972; 1973; 1976; 1979

Team data
- Colors: Brown, gold, white
- Ballpark: Borleske Stadium
- Owner(s)/ Operator(s): Patricia Nelly (1976-1982); Verne Russell (1970-1975)

The Walla Walla Padres were the primary name of a minor league baseball team in the northwest United States, located in Walla Walla, Washington. Named after their parent club, the Padres were members of the Class A short-season Northwest League for ten years, from 1973 through 1982.

== History ==
In 1969, with the expansion of Major League Baseball, Walla Walla sought the prospect of bringing professional baseball to the community. On January 12, 1969, it was announced that the Walla Walla Valley Baseball Club had officially been awarded membership into the Northwest League. The franchise played three seasons as an affiliate of the Philadelphia Phillies until 1971. In 1972, in an odd arrangement, the club played as an affiliate of Triple-A Pacific Coast League Hawaii Islanders. Following the season, Walla Walla signed a player development contract with the San Diego Padres, who had previously partnered with Tri-City.

Adopting the namesake of their parent club, Walla Walla became the Padres. In their first season affiliated with the Padres, Walla Walla won the league title in 1973. The Padres claimed the Northwest League crown again in 1976, defeating the fabled Portland Mavericks two games to one in the championship series. Walla Walla sought a third title in 1979, but fell to the Central Oregon Phillies.

After years of declining attendance the franchise was sold following the 1982 season to New Jersey–based Big Six Sports. The new ownership group promptly moved the club west to Richland, rebranded them as the Tri-Cities Triplets, and signed a player development contract with the Texas Rangers. The San Diego Padres shifted their NWL affiliate to Spokane, which had just lost its Triple-A team to Las Vegas. Professional baseball continued in Walla Walla with the independent Blue Mountain Bears in 1983, but after one season, they moved west and became the Everett Giants in 1984.

== Early Walla Walla Baseball ==
The history of baseball in the Walla Walla Valley dates back to the late 19th century. The Walla Walla Walla Wallas of the Pacific Interstate League played in 1891. The Walla Wallas continued play in the 1908 Inland Empire League and the 1902 Inland Empire League team played with the nickname "Sharpshooters". In 1912 the Western Tri-State League was formed with the Walla Walla Bears playing in the circuit for three season before disbanding.

== Ballpark ==
Walla Walla teams played at Borleske Stadium, located at 409 West Rees Avenue in Walla Walla, Washington. The stadium is still in use today.

== Season-by-season record ==
Season	PDC	Division	Finish	Wins	Losses	Win%	Postseason	Manager	Attendance
Walla Walla Padres
1973	SDP	North	1st	51	29	.638	League champion by virtue of best record	Cliff Ditto	33,259
1974	SDP	East	2nd	47	37	.560		Cliff Ditto	28,295
1975	SDP	South	2nd	48	31	.608		Cliff Ditto	25,662
1976	SDP	South	1st	46	26	.639	Defeated Portland in championship series 2-1	Cliff Ditto	28,971
1977	SDP	Affiliate	2nd	41	27	.603		Cliff Ditto	27,272
1978	SDP	North	2nd	45	24	.652		Cliff Ditto	51,488
1979	SDP	North	1st	40	30	.571	Lost to Central Oregon in championship series 2-1	Curt Daniels	20,358
1980	SDP	North	3rd	35	34	.507		Curt Daniels	15,188
1981	SDP	North	3rd	29	41	.414		Bill Bryk	28,909
1982	SDP	North	3rd	32	38	.457		Jim Skalen	18,771

Division winner	League champions

== Notable players ==
Two future hall of famers played for the team: shortstop Ozzie Smith (1977) and outfielder Tony Gwynn (1981). Their NWL batting averages were .301 for Smith and .331 for Gwynn.

Other future major leaguers included Joe McIntosh (1974–1975), Eric Show (1978), Ron Tingley (1977–1978), Bob Geren (1979–1980), Mark Parent (1979), Greg Booker (1981), John Kruk (1981), Jimmy Jones (1982), Gene Walter (1982) and Mitch Williams (1982). Geren and Parent both became managers with different teams (Geren with the Oakland A's of MLB and Parent with the Chico Outlaws of the Golden Baseball League).

== Notable alumni ==
=== Baseball Hall of Fame alumni ===
- Tony Gwynn (1981), inducted 2007
- Ozzie Smith (1977), inducted 2002

=== Other notable alumni ===
- Greg Booker (1981)
- Bob Geren (1979–1980)
- Andy Hawkins (1978)
- Dane Iorg (1971)
- Bob Jones (1912)
- Jimmy Jones (1982)
- John Kruk (1981) 3 x MLB All-Star
- Mark Parent (1979)
- Earl Sheely (1913-1914)
- Eric Show (1978)
- Ron Tingley (1977–1978)
- Tom Trebelhorn (1972)
- Gene Walter (1982)
- Mitch Williams (1982) MLB All-Star

Preceded by Walla Walla Islanders	Northwest League franchise (1973-1982)	Succeeded by Tri-Cities Triplets
