= Tri-Cities Triplets =

Coordinates: 46.276°N 119.286°W

- 1983–1986; Richland, Washington

Minor league affiliations
- Class: Class A Short Season (1983–1986)
- League: Northwest League (1983–1986)
- Division: Washington

Major league affiliations
- Team: Independent (1985–1986); Texas Rangers (1983–1984)

Minor league titles
- League titles (1): 1984
- Division titles (1): 1984

Team data
- Colors: Royal blue, red, white
- Ballpark: Bomber Bowl

Location in Washington

The Tri-Cities Triplets were a minor league baseball team in the northwest United States, located in Richland, Washington, one of the Tri-Cities. The Triplets were members of the Class A short-season Northwest League for four seasons, from 1983 through 1986.

== History ==
After an eight year absence, professional baseball returned to the Tri-Cities area as New Jersey–based Big Six Sports purchased the Walla Walla Padres franchise following the 1982 season. Seeking a larger market and improved facilities, the new ownership group promptly moved the club west sixty miles (100 km) to Richland, and took the outfield fence with them. The team adopted the unique name, Tri-Cities Triplets, and were an affiliate of the Texas Rangers.

In their inaugural season in 1983, the team compiled a 33–37 (.471) record, third in the Washington Division, jockeying with the Blue Mountain Bears down the stretch for the runner-up position. The team's home attendance was just shy of forty-nine thousand and they hosted the Northwest League All-Star Game.

Tri-Cities continued their affiliation with the Rangers in 1984, and posted a league-best record of 46–28 (.622) to win the Washington Division title. The Triplets hosted the Medford A's in the championship game on Labor Day. In a game with 34 hits, the Triplets had eighteen and outscored the A's 17–8 to claim the Northwest League crown. Coinciding with their on field success, home attendance exceeded fifty-two thousand.

Coming off a league championship, the club witnessed substantial changes, as Southern California–based attorney Richard Leavitt led a group that purchased the franchise. The new owners hoped to build on the success of the previous season, but that proved to be difficult in 1985 as the Texas Rangers declined extending their player development contract. Tri-Cities was left to play as an independent club and finished last in their division with a record of 33–41 (.446).

The franchise again changed hands entering 1986 as Tri-Cities Baseball Inc., composed of Brett family members (including George Brett), purchased the club. The new owners identified the need for a facility renovations or a new stadium as being necessary for long term viability. Again without a major league affiliation, the Triplets stayed at the bottom of the division at 25–49 (.338).

Following two consecutive last place finishes and no prospect of improved facilities, the relocation of the team was imminent. The Brett group, who also owned the Spokane Indians, sold the team. Diamond Sports took control of the franchise with approval to relocate, and moved to Boise, Idaho, for the 1987 season and became the Boise Hawks. The franchise remains there, but switched to the Pioneer League in 2021.

== Ballpark ==
The Triplets played at the Richland High school baseball field located next to Fran Rish Stadium, located at 1350 Lee Boulevard in Richland. .

== Season-by-season record ==
Season	PDC	Division	Finish	Wins	Losses	Win%	Postseason	Manager	Attendance
Tri-Cities Triplets
1983	TEX	Washington	3rd	33	37	.471		Dave Oliver	48,896
1984	TEX	Washington	1st	46	28	.622	Defeated Medford in championship	Marty Scott	52,042
1985		Washington	4th	33	41	.446		Ed Olsen	32,424
1986		Washington	4th	25	49	.338		Pat Murphy	30,605

Division winner	League champions

Preceded by Walla Walla Padres	Northwest League franchise (1983-1986)	Succeeded by Boise Hawks
