= Walla Walla Bears =

- (1969); Walla Walla, Washington

Minor league affiliations
- Class: Class A Short Season
- League: Northwest League

Major league affiliations
- Team: Philadelphia Phillies

Team data
- Colors: Crimson, white
- Ballpark: Borleske Stadium
- Owner/ Operator: Dale Hanan
- General manager: Ronald Kaluzok
- Manager: Howie Bedell

The Walla Walla Bears were a minor league baseball team in the northwest United States, located in Walla Walla, Washington. The Bears were members of the Class A short-season Northwest League and were affiliated with the Philadelphia Phillies.

== History ==
In 1969, with the expansion of Major League Baseball, Walla Walla sought the prospect of bringing professional baseball to the community. On January 12, 1969 it was announced that the Walla Walla Valley Baseball Club, led by Dale Hanan, had officially been awarded membership into the Northwest League The franchise secured a working agreement with the Philadelphia Phillies of the National League. Following a name the team contest, General Manager Ronald Kaluzok announced the club would be called the Walla Walla Bears. The Bears announced Howie Bedell as manager. Bedell had played with Philadelphia in 1968 and served as a player/coach with the club's AA affiliate in Reading. By June the Phillies prospects began arriving in Walla Walla to assemble the Bears roster. Walla Walla opened the season at home against Tri-City. With 1,802 in attendance, the Bears dropped the opener 5-3. The Bears made headlines not related to on the field performance. During a July 7 contest with the Medford Dodgers, in what started as a single player caught smoking behind the dugout evolved into the entire team being ejected resulting in a forfeit. Bedell earned a seven game suspension accompanying a fine for the incident. In a season of struggles the Bears went on a seven game winning streak in mid-July. The brass from Philadelphia made visit to Walla Walla. The big club was pleased with Bears and renewed their affiliation with the club. In their inaugural season the Bears posted a record of 37-42. The brass Philadelphia was pleased with Walla Walla and renewed their affiliation with the club. At the request of their parent club, the club dropped the name Bears and became the Walla Walla Phillies.

== The ballpark ==
The Bears played at Borleske Stadium, located at 409 West Rees Avenue in Walla Walla, Washington. The stadium is still in use today.

== Team identity ==
The Walla Walla Bears adopted a color scheme of their parent Phillies, who wore crimson and white at the time. Their home uniforms were nearly identical to the Phillies. The cream with red pinstripes flannel jersey was embellished with the script lettering Bears across the chest. On the road the team would were traditional grey uniforms with a block WW on the left chest consisting of crimson on white twill. Both the home and road uniforms utilized a zipper front in place of buttons. Topping of the uniforms was a crimson hat featuring a block W in white embroidery.

== Season-by-season record ==
Season	PDC	Division	Finish	Wins	Losses	Win%	Postseason	Manager	Attendance
Walla Walla Bears
1969	PHI		3rd	37	42	.468		Howie Bedell	27,882

Preceded by Expansion franchise	Northwest League franchise (1969)	Succeeded by Walla Walla Phillies
