= Lithia & Driveway Fields =

Athletic facility in Medford, Oregon

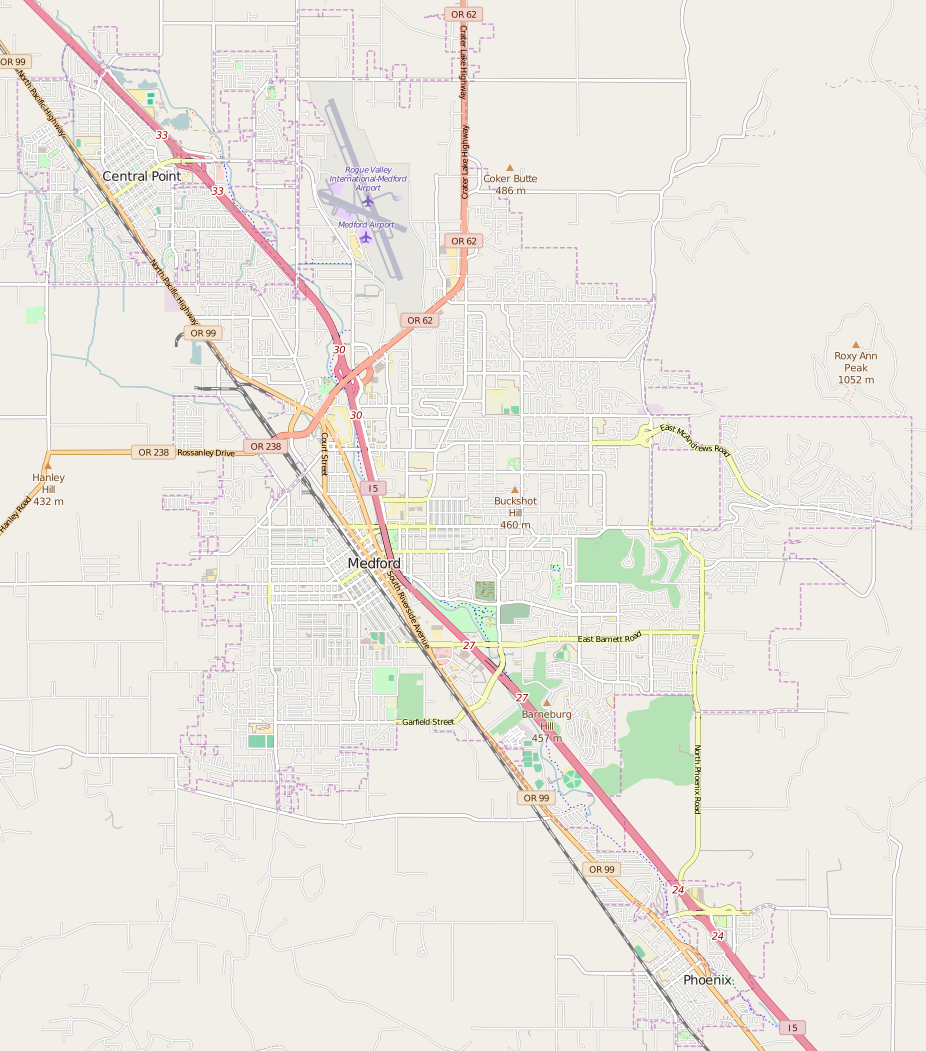
- Location in Medford, Oregon Lithia & Driveway Fields (Oregon)
- Location: 300 Lowry Lane Pacific Highway; Medford, Oregon
- Coordinates: 42.301°N 122.844°W
- Owner: Gary Miller
- Operator: Medford Parks and Recreation
- Capacity: Varies
- Surface: FieldTurf

Construction
- Opened: 2007, 19 years ago

Tenant
- Southern Oregon Starphire FC (NPSL/PPL) (2009–present)

Lithia & Driveway Fields (formerly U.S. Cellular Community Park) is an athletic facility in Medford, Oregon. The park is on South Pacific Highway, visible from Interstate 5 at around milepost 26. It features five baseball fields (which includes a professional-sized and two youth fields), four softball fields, two sports fields, and a professional-sized championship soccer field, which was the home venue of the Southern Oregon Fuego of the National Premier Soccer League.

The elevation of the park is approximately 1,400 feet (430 m) above sea level.

== Facilities ==
=== Harry & David Field ===
Harry & David Field hosts youth and high school baseball, the American Legion Medford Mustangs, and the Medford Rogues, an independent collegiate wood bat team. It is named for the Harry & David Corporation, whose world headquarters are located just south of the ballpark's location. It was the brainchild of local businessman Gary Miller.

The ballpark opened in 2005 and is off-limits to professional teams who plan on picking Medford to set up shop under an agreement reached between the stadium and the city. It is only being used for amateur baseball and other community events under the agreement.

From 2012 to 2013, the stadium underwent a major renovation and expansion to accommodate the new Rogues of the West Coast League. Though the field is adjacent to U.S. Cellular Community Park, it is not owned by the city, but is its own separate entity.

It replaced Miles Field, the home of minor league baseball in the city starting in 1979, when the Bend Timber Hawks of the Class A-Short Season Northwest League became the Medford A's. After 21 seasons and two name changes, the Southern Oregon Timberjacks moved to British Columbia in October 1999 and became the Vancouver Canadians. Miles Field was demolished 22 years ago in 2004 and is now the site of a Wal-Mart store. The light towers, scoreboard, and foul poles from Miles Field were transferred to the new park.

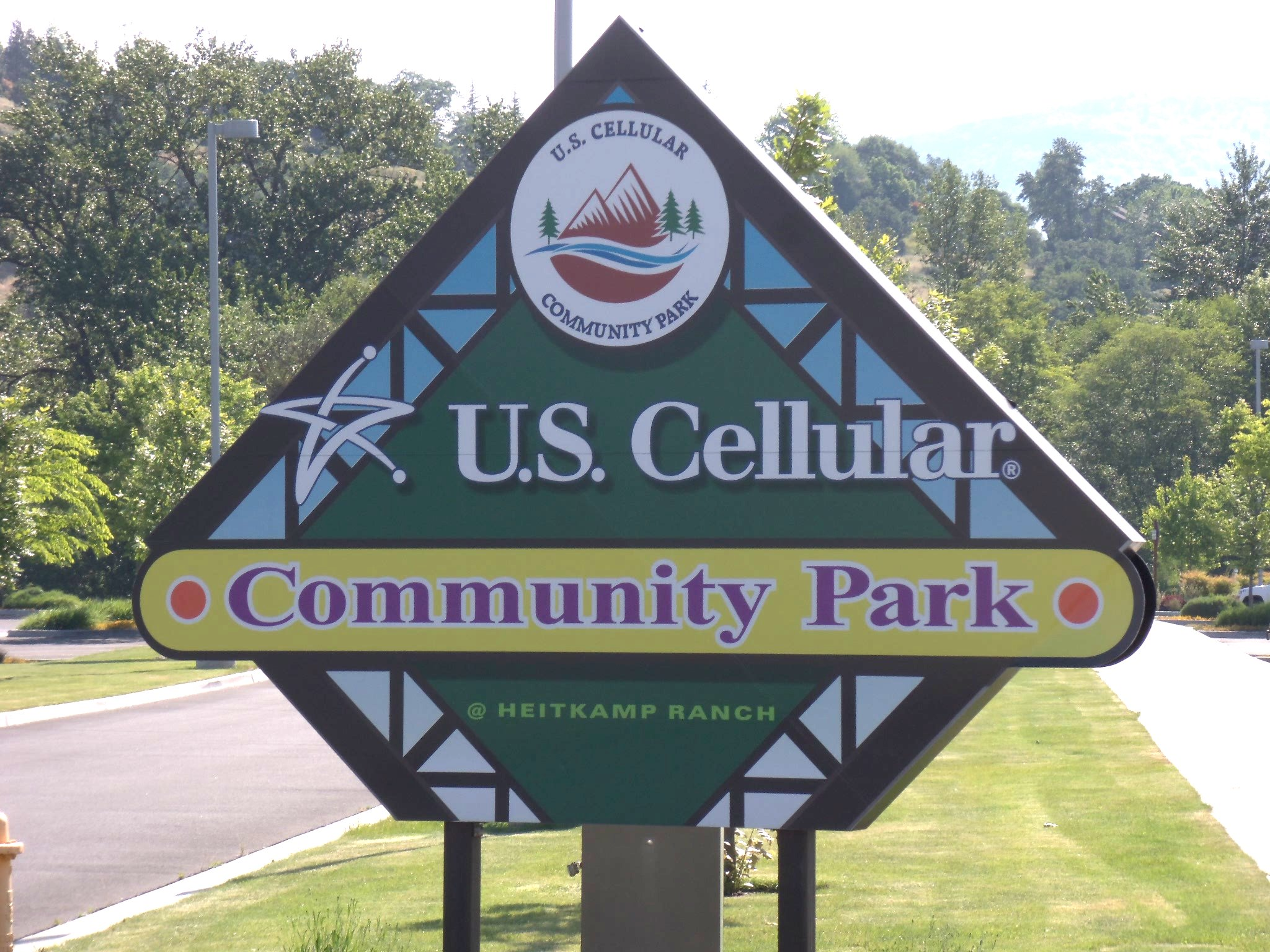
Former US Cellular Community Park sign at the north entrance

=== Spectrum Field ===
Spectrum Field is a professional-sized all-weather artificial turf baseball field used for only high school and youth baseball games. It is the main field for Cascade Christian High School Challenger baseball (who won the 2012 OSAA State 3A Championship) and occasion site for St. Mary's School Crusader baseball if their home field is unplayable. The naming rights to the field currently belong to Charter Cable under the Spectrum brand.

=== Radio Medford Field (Field #1) ===
On December 19, 2011, number one softball diamond, one of five softball field at the US Cellular Community Park complex was renamed Radio Medford Field per an agreement between Mapleton Communications of Medford and the complex good for five years and $175,000

=== Football/Soccer Field ===
The USCCP Soccer field is a championship-sized field that plays host to the NPSL's Southern Oregon Fuego. It has also played host to high school and youth football and soccer games. The high school athletic programs who use the facilities for events include Cascade Christian High School football and soccer and St. Mary's School soccer. It is also the main home for the Rogue Valley Timbers Soccer Club, a youth soccer program that is part of the Portland Timbers (MLS) Alliance.

== History ==
This property was purchased by Martin Dietrich Heitkamp and his wife Gertrude Heitkamp in 1937. Their children Martin and Rose (Leever) helped farm and run the cattle ranch that included what is now Manor Hill. Martin remained on the property and raised his family with his wife Linda. In 2007 the property was sold to the City of Medford and subsequently, became Lithia & Driveway Fields at Heitkamp Ranch.
