= Yuba-Sutter Gold Sox =

Former California collegiate baseball team

- Logo

Information
- League: Montna Farms Summer Series (2020–2022); Bay Area Collegiate League (2022)
- Location: Marysville, California
- Ballpark: Bryant Field
- Founded: 1995
- Folded: 2022
- League championships: 4 (2006, 2011, 2014, 2020)
- Division championships: 4 (2006, 2011, 2014, 2020)
- Former name: Marysville Gold Sox (2010–2017); Yuba-Sutter Gold Sox (2002–09, 2018-2022); Feather River Fury (2001); Feather River Mudcats (2000); Reno Blackjacks (1999); Reno Chukars (1996–98); Surrey Glaciers (1995)
- Former leagues: Golden State Collegiate Baseball League (2019); Great West League (2016–2018); Horizon Air Summer Series (2005-2015); California Collegiate League (2003–04); Western Baseball League (1995–2002)
- Former ballparks: Moana Stadium; Stetson Bowl
- Colors: Royal Blue, Red, Gold
- Ownership: YCM Baseball, LLC
- General manager: Tommy Lininger
- Manager: Brock Ragatz
- Media: Appeal-Democrat (newspaper); KETQ-LP 93.3 (radio)

The Yuba-Sutter Gold Sox were a summer collegiate wood-bat baseball club based in Marysville, California, in the United States, that began as an independent professional team in 1995. They played their home games at Bryant Field, adjacent to Ellis Lake, in Marysville from 2002 to 2022. The team name was changed to the Marysville Gold Sox in 2010 to more particularly identify the city in which the team was located, but had since reverted to "Yuba-Sutter".

The Gold Sox name was chosen in honor of Yuba-Sutter (two adjoining counties separated by a river with the towns of Marysville and Yuba City on each side), having been called the "Gateway to the Gold Fields" during the California gold rush of the mid-1800s. The Gold Sox mascot is Mr. G, a gecko-like creature that is a favorite with children.

The Gold Sox ceased operations and were replaced by the Marysville Drakes of the Pecos League.

== Team history ==
=== Professional team ===
==== Western Baseball League (2002) ====
The franchise began as a professional team in the Western Baseball League in 1995 as the Surrey Glaciers and only played one season at Stetson Bowl in Surrey, British Columbia, Canada. In 1996 they relocated to Reno, Nevada, becoming known as the Reno Chukars and played their home games at Moana Stadium. They changed their name to the Reno Blackjacks in 1999 and played their final season in Reno before relocating to Marysville, where they were renamed the Feather River Mudcats for their inaugural 2000 season in Marysville.

Because of the team's infringement on the previously trademarked name of Mudcats by the Carolina Mudcats of the Southern League, the Feather River Mudcats changed their name to the Feather River Fury in preparation for the 2001 season, though never took the field under that name since the team filed for bankruptcy prior to the season start. There was no baseball in Marysville for the 2001 season.

Gold Sox Baseball Alternate Logo

The City of Marysville stepped in to operate the team for the 2002 season in order to keep baseball alive in the area and the city-owned ballpark in use. The City changed the name to Yuba-Sutter Gold Sox and played the season in the Western Baseball League. Upon conclusion of that 2002 season the Western Baseball League disbanded, thus ending the Gold Sox as a professional team.

=== Collegiate Summer Baseball ===
The team was purchased from the City in 2003 by Bob Bavasi of Bavasi Sports Partners and local auto dealer Don McCullough (1936–2005) and began 2003 season play as a summer collegiate wood-bat team as it remains to this day.

The ball club played the 2003 and 2004 seasons in the California Collegiate League.

In 2005, the Gold Sox became the host team for the Horizon Air Summer Series, a collegiate wood bat league created by Bob Bavasi.

Prior to the 2005 season, Don McCullough died. Upon McCullough's death, Peter Bavasi, former General Manager of the San Diego Padres, President of the Toronto Blue Jays and Cleveland Indians, came out of retirement to help administer the club for the 2005 and 2006 seasons.

On January 1, 2007, Bob Bavasi invited Fair Oaks attorney Tom Lininger and his wife Karyn to join in the ownership of the club as majority shareholders. The team was renamed the Marysville Gold Sox in 2010. Tom Lininger became the team's managing partner and sold the team after the 2014 season.

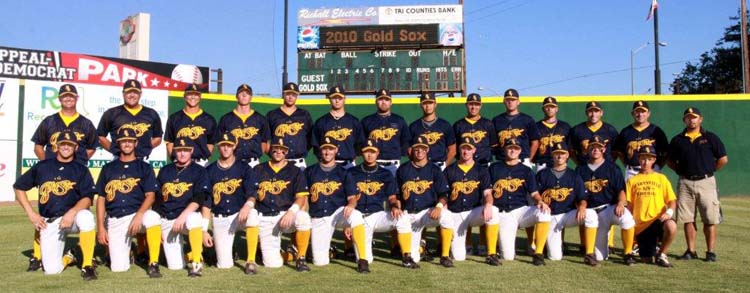
2010 Marysville Gold Sox

==== Great West League (2016-2018) ====
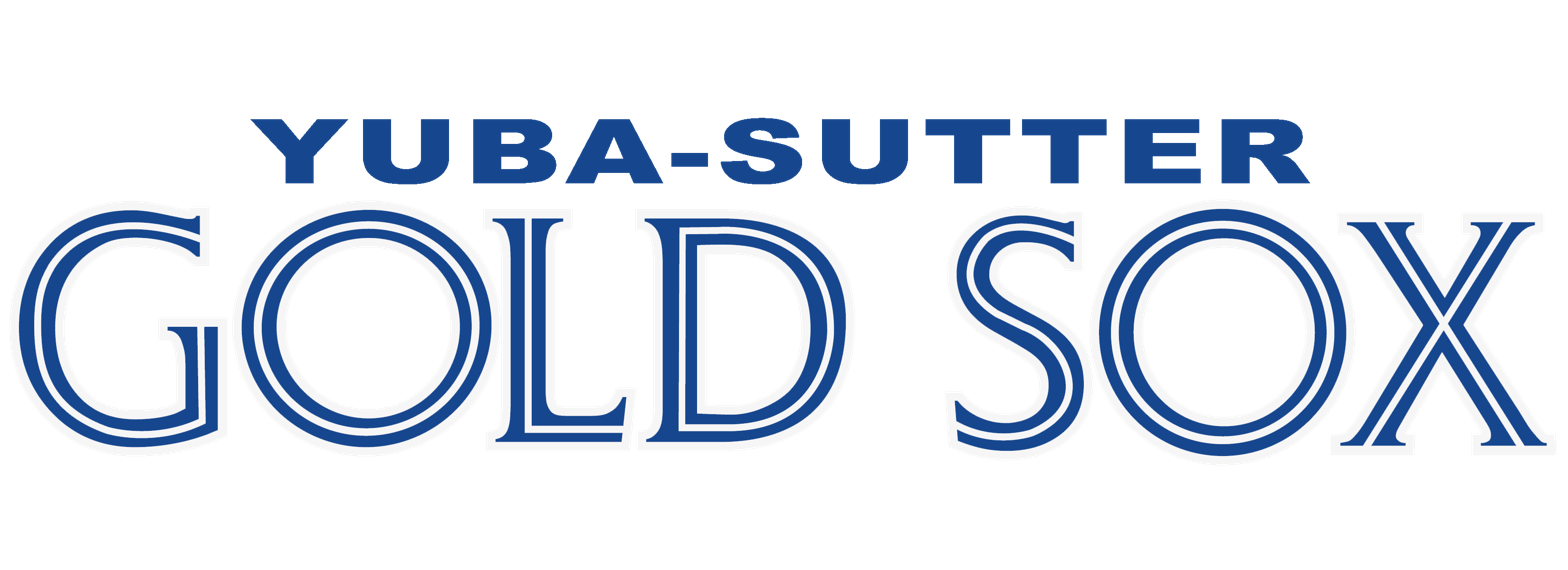
Gold Sox wordmark 2018

In 2015, the organization was sold to CSH Holdings, Pat Gillick, Kevin Knight and Jake Knight. In 2016, the team moved to the Great West League which played a balanced schedule home and away. The League and team conduct operations like a class A short season minor league baseball team (examples: New York-Penn League and Northwest League). The ownership group hired veteran general manager Michael Mink to handle the operation in November 2016.

On November 6, 2017, the Gold Sox management announced that they were reverting the team name back to the Yuba-Sutter Gold Sox after the originally-named professional team.

On October 4, 2018, the Gold Sox announced that they are considering options for 2019 and beyond as a result of the Great West League suspending operations. On November 15, 2018, the Gold Sox announced that they would cease operations if new ownership was not found.

==== Golden State Collegiate Baseball League (2019) ====
In 2019, a new local group, YCM Baseball Group, LLC, led by local agricultural entrepreneur Al Montna, purchased the Gold Sox and became members of the Golden State Collegiate Baseball League joining former GWL rivals the Medford Rogues.

==== Montna Farms Summer Series (2020-2022) ====
In 2020, the Gold Sox season in the GSCBL was cancelled due to the COVID-19 pandemic. As a result, they helped create a smaller short-season league known as the Sierra Central-Montna Farms Summer Series. The Gold Sox were the inaugural champions defeating the Lincoln Potters (Note: The Potters are members of the CCL and did not know or agree to be a part of the Montna Farms Summer Series). The Series launched its second season in 2021, which they named themselves champions once again. In 2022, the series name was shortened to the Montna Farms Summer Series. Also in 2022, the Gold Sox joined the Bay Area Collegiate League.

=== Post-Gold Sox baseball in Marysville ===
On September 7, 2022, the Gold Sox announced that they will not be taking to the field in 2023 and will reevaluate their position in summer collegiate baseball in the region. They are officially considering themselves "on hiatus", though they have effectively ceased operations. They were replaced by the new Marysville Drakes of the Pecos League in 2023. However, they, too, would fold after two seasons when the Pecos League left them off of the schedule. They would be replaced in 2025 by the Yuba-Sutter High Wheelers of the Pioneer League, an independent minor league partnered with Major League Baseball and defending league champions relocated from Davis, California.

== Bryant Field ==
Bryant Field

Since their inception, the Gold Sox have played their home games at what was originally known as Bryant Field, located along Highway 70 in the east part of Marysville. It has experienced several name changes since then, including Appeal-Democrat Park, All Seasons RV Stadium, Colusa Casino Stadium and Hard Rock Park. The stadium is once again known as Bryant Field. The Gold Sox shared their field with the Yuba City Bears, who joined the GWL in 2017, then later folded their GWL operations.

== Year-by-year record ==
Year	League	Wins	Losses	Finish	Manager	Playoffs
2002	Western Baseball League	43	47	3rd North Division	Tim Gloyd	Did not qualify
2003	California Collegiate League	31	13	3rd	Brad Peek	NA
2004	California Collegiate League	34	10	3rd	Brad Peek	NA
2005	Horizon Air Summer Series	30	10	2nd McCullough Division	Brad Peek	NA
2006	Horizon Air Summer Series	32	8	1st McCullough Division	Brad Peek	NA
2007	Horizon Air Summer Series	27	13	3rd McCullough Division	Jack Johnson	NA
2008	Horizon Air Summer Series	30	10	2nd McCullough Division	Jack Johnson	NA
2009	Horizon Air Summer Series	28	12	4th McCullough Division	Jack Johnson	NA
2010	Horizon Air Summer Series	31	9	2nd McCullough Division	Jack Johnson	NA
2011	Horizon Air Summer Series	31	8	1st McCullough Division	Jack Johnson	NA
2012	Horizon Air Summer Series	29	11	3rd McCullough Division	Jack Johnson	NA
2013	Horizon Air Summer Series	27	13	2nd McCullough Division	Jack Johnson	NA
2014	Horizon Air Summer Series	33	7	1st McCullough Division	Jack Johnson	NA
2016	Great West League	29	28	4th GWL	Mike Walker	Did not qualify
2017	Great West League	23	37	5th GWL	Dallas Correa	Did not qualify
2018	Great West League	15	41	6th GWL	Jeramy Gillen	Did not qualify
2019	Golden State Collegiate Baseball League	29	28	3rd GWL	Mike Frantz	
2020	Sierra Central-Montna Farms Summer Series	23	37	1st SCMF	Brock Stassi	Did not qualify

== Notable alumni ==
- Dallas Braden (2003)
- Tommy Everidge (2003, 2004)
- Anthony Bass (2007)
- Curtis Partch (2007)
- Brock Stassi (2007, 2008, 2011)
- Max Stassi (2009)
- Cody Anderson (2010, 2011)
- Justin Haley (2010)
- Drew Anderson (2012)

== Coaching staff ==
- Brock Ragatz (field manager)
- Ryan Mattheus (assistant coach)

== Radio broadcasts ==
The Yuba-Sutter Gold Sox official flagship radio station was KUBA-AM 1600. Todd Kuhnen provides play-by-play. Games are currently broadcast on the team's Facebook Live page.
