= Yuba City Bears =

Former California collegiate summer baseball team

- Logo

Information
- League: Great West League (2017)
- Location: Yuba City, California
- Ballpark: Colusa Casino Stadium (Marysville, California)
- Founded: 2017
- Folded: 2017 (inactive)
- League championships: 0
- Division championships: 0
- Colors: Purple, Teal, Gray, White
- Ownership: CSH Holdings, Pat Gillick
- Media: Appeal-Democrat (newspaper); KETQ-LP 93.3 (radio)
- Website: www.yubacitybears.com

The Yuba City Bears were a summer collegiate baseball team based in Marysville, California, in the United States and representing Yuba City, California. They were a member of the Great West League, having been established in 2017, and had played their home games at Colusa Casino Stadium adjacent to Ellis Lake, in Marysville. They had shared the facilities with the Yuba-Sutter Gold Sox, but have since folded their GWL operations.

== Team history ==
The Yuba City Bears collegiate woodbat team gets its name from a former minor league baseball team that played from 1932 to 1949. They were founded to bring back a natural rivalry with the Marysville Gold Sox as the original Bears and Marysville Giants competed during that time.

On November 7, 2017, the GWL announced that the Bears were not going to play in 2018 and have since been replaced by the San Francisco Seals.

Colusa Casino Stadium, home of both the Marysville Gold Sox and Yuba City Bears

== Year-by-year record ==
Year	League	Wins	Losses	Finish	Manager	Playoffs
2017	Great West League	N/A	N/A	N/A GWL	TBA	N/A

== Coaching staff ==
- Jeramy Gillen - Head Coach
- Stuart Bradley - Assistant Coach
- Brandon Asher - Assistant Coach
- Marc Giampaoli - Athletic Trainer

== Radio broadcasts ==
The Yuba City Bears official flagship radio station is KETQ-LP 93.3 in Yuba City and Marysville.
