= Champions Soccer League USA =

American men's soccer league

- Founded: 2014
- Folded: 2017
- Country: United States
- Confederation: CONCACAF; US Soccer
- Divisions: 4
- Number of clubs: 39
- Promotion to: Internal
- Relegation to: Internal
- Domestic cup: Lamar Hunt U.S. Open Cup
- Last champions: St. Pete Raiders (2015)
- Website: CSL USA website

The Champions Soccer League USA (CSL USA) was an American men's soccer league. The league was sanctioned by the United States Adult Soccer Association (USASA). The league announced that after the 2017 season CSL USA would use promotion and relegation policies; however, the league did not survive long enough to implement this planned structure.

== History ==
The CSL USA began in 2014 with the initial season beginning in 2015. St. Pete Raiders captured the first league title with an 8-1-1 record. The league began in Florida and has expanded to locations around the United States beginning with the Northeast region.

On April 6, 2017 CSL USA was granted status as a USASA national league (clubs in all four regions, at least 32 member clubs located in a minimum of 12 different states) just the third league (NPSL, PDL) with this distinction. It is the first-ever national league to use promotion and relegation in US Soccer.

CSL USA did not have a 2018 season, and some teams from the league moved to the United Premier Soccer League.

== Teams ==
Region I	City	Stadium	Founded
Boston Siege FC	Boston, Massachusetts	Harry Della Russo Stadium	
Boston Victory SC U23	Boston, Massachusetts	Newell Stadium	2011
Lincoln Club de Futbol	Bristol, Rhode Island	Mt. Hope High School	
Lynn United FC	Lynn, Massachusetts	Manning Stadium	
New Hampshire Rapids FC	Topsfield, Massachusetts	Essex Tech High School	
New Hampshire Rovers	Nashua, New Hampshire	Veterans Memorial Stadium	
Real New York FC	Long Island, New York	Old Boys High School	
Rockingham Park Rangers	Salem, New Hampshire	Pierce Field	
Safira FC	Somerville, Massachusetts	Dilboy Stadium	2008
Worcester FC	Worcester, Massachusetts	Foley Stadium	
Region II	City	Stadium	Founded
Danes FC			2017
GIFC	Gary, Indiana		2017
Lincoln Soccer Club	Lincoln, Nebraska	Seacrest field	2017
Indy Saints FC	Indianapolis, Indiana		2017
Kenosha FC	Kenosha, Wisconsin		2017
Lincoln United FC	Lincoln, Nebraska		2017
Pitt SC (2018)	Pittsburgh, Pennsylvania		2017
South Bend FC	South Bend, Indiana		2017
Region III	City	Stadium	Founded
Daytona Diablo SC (2018)	Daytona, Florida		2011
Deportivo Lake Mary (2018)	Lake Mary, Florida		2017
Florida Soccer Club	Temple Terrace, Florida	Spirit Fields	1975
FC Ginga	Orlando, Florida		
Gainesville Gators SC (2018)	Gainesville, Florida		
Inter United SC	Orlando, Florida		
Lakehead Eagles FC (2018)	Lakeland, Florida		
Orlando FC Barça	Orlando, Florida		
St. Augustine Saints (2018)	St. Augustine, Florida		
St. Pete Aztecs FC	St. Petersburg, Florida	Haskell Field (Shorecrest)	1987
Supreme FC	Miami, Florida		
Tampa Marauders FC	Tampa, Florida		2011
Together We Are 1	Winter Haven, Florida		
Region IV	City	Stadium	Founded
Chico City Rangers FC	Chico, California	Degarmo Park	
Dynamos FC	Livermore, California	Las Positas College	
Glenn County Barnstormers FC	Orland, California	Rosevelt Field	
Redding Royals FC	Redding, California	Redding Soccer Park	
Southern Oregon Starphire FC	Ashland, Oregon	U.S. Cellular Community Park	
Yuba City Alliance FC	Yuba City, California	Yuba College	

== Champions ==
Season	Champion	Record
2015	St. Pete Raiders	8-1-1
2017	TBD	
