= Klamath Falls Gems =

Klamath Falls Gems may refer to one of the following baseball teams:

- Klamath Falls Gems (1948–1951), a former Minor League Baseball team in the Far West League
- Klamath Falls Gems (2011–2018), a collegiate woodbat baseball team based in Klamath Falls, Oregon
