= Arcata Ball Park =

Stadium in Arcata, California, US

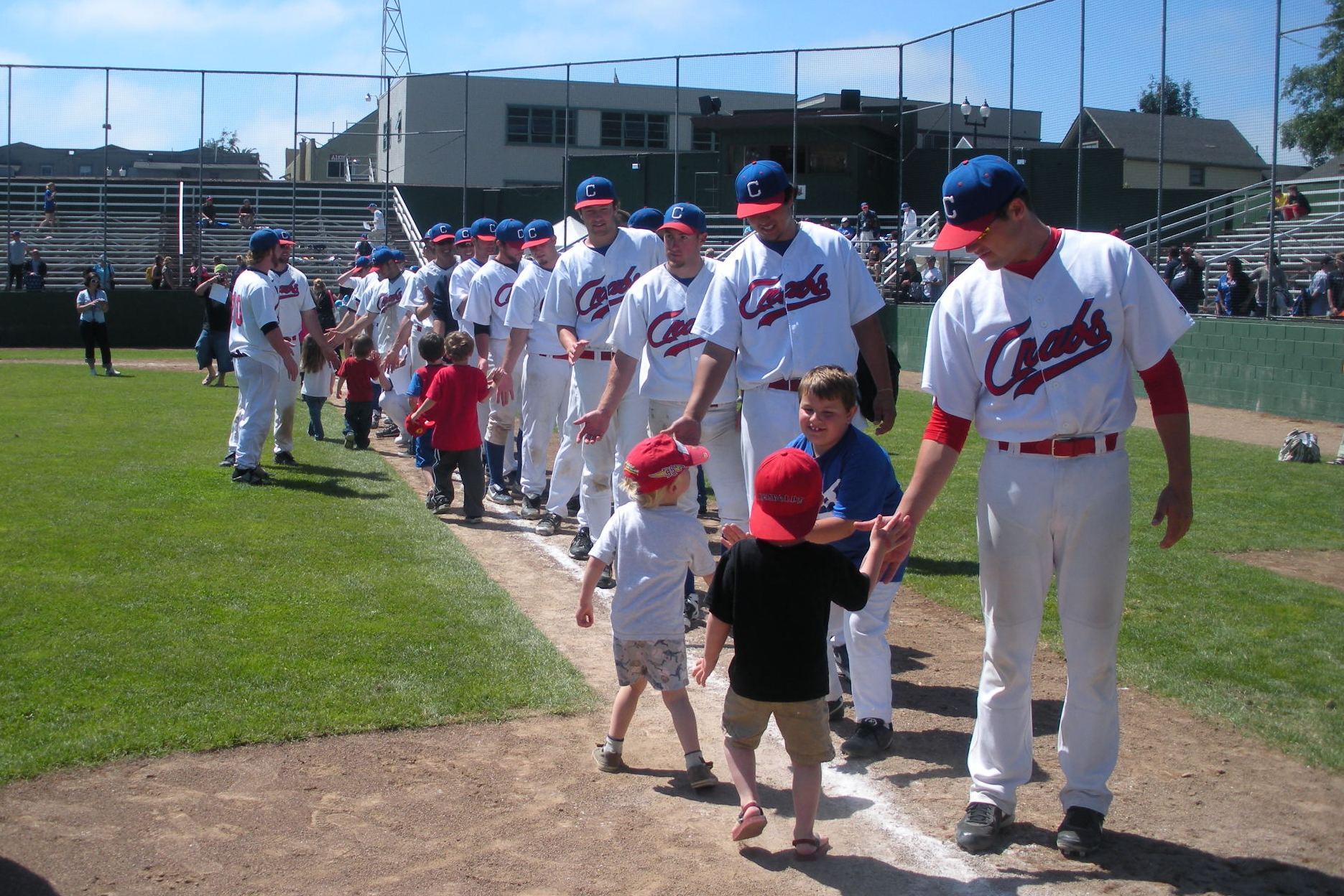
- Humboldt Crabs, fan appreciation day, Arcata Ball Park, 2010
- Interactive map of Arcata Ball Park
- Location: 888 F Street; Arcata, California 95521
- Coordinates: 40.868077°N 124.084369°W
- Owner: City of Arcata
- Capacity: 909 (seated), 2,000 (with LF and RF grass seating)
- Surface: Natural grass
- Record attendance: 1,622 (2009)
- Field size: Left Field: 307 ft (94 m); Left-Center: 394 ft (120 m); Right-Center: 368 ft (112 m); Right Alley: 338 ft (103 m); Right Field: 304 ft (93 m)

Construction
- Groundbreaking: 1937
- Opened: 1938
- Renovated: 1952, 1974, 1976, 1978-80, 2006, 2018-19, 2024-25
- Cost: $11,577 ($259,277 in 2025 dollars)

Tenants
- Humboldt State varsity baseball (1940s-1981); Cal Poly Humboldt Club baseball (1986-present); Pop Warner football (1960-1976); Arcata High School baseball Humboldt Crabs (1945-53, 1966–present)

Arcata Ball Park is a collegiate baseball venue in the Western United States, located in Arcata, California. Opened in 1938, it is the home of the summer collegiate Humboldt Crabs. Arcata Ball Park is located at the corner of F Street and 9th Street in downtown Arcata, near the Plaza. The ballpark is tightly surrounded by a bus station on the third base side, busy F Street on the first base side, Arcata City Hall, Police Station and library behind right field, and Highway 101 just over the left field fence.

The ballpark, a Works Progress Administration project, was approved in 1936, finalized in 1937, and completed in 1938, for a cost of $11,577. The ballpark was built on swamp land originally donated by Arcata Postmaster George Marken on October 23, 1923, and filled in during 1933. The ballpark's original wood grandstands stood until May 1978, but the original wood facade entrance still stood as the entrance until it was demolished in September 2024.

== Humboldt Crabs ==
The summer collegiate Humboldt Crabs are Arcata Ball Park's primary tenant and have been for over fifty years. The Crabs, who formed in 1945, are the oldest continuously operated summer collegiate baseball team in the country, celebrating their 75th consecutive season in 2019.

The Crabs have won the California National Baseball Congress championship many times, advancing to the NBC World Series in Wichita, Kansas, for most of the 1960s, '70s, and '80s.

Over 70 former Crabs have gone on to play in the MLB. These include Bruce Bochte, Craig Lefferts, Mike Harkey, Mike Redmond, and Dane Iorg.

== Renovations ==
In June 1952, after two outfield light poles fell onto the field, the light poles were moved and raised 10 feet, a 20-foot fence was installed in left and center field, home plate was moved 8 feet closer to the grandstands and the entire diamond moved along with it, all to accommodate the new freeway, Highway 101, with resulting new dimensions of 315 feet to left field, 365 to center field and 305 to right field.

In 1960, Pop Warner youth football was approved to play on a field laid out across the outfield, and football was played at the ballpark until at least 1976. In 1962, the ballpark grandstands were renovated with a new capacity of about 1,000, and a new softball diamond and mini grandstand was built in right field where a softball infield had been since at least the 1950s.

In 1967, the new Arcata City Hall, which included the Arcata Police Department, Justice Court, other city offices, and the library were built all in one building complex just beyond the right field fence. In 1984, the new Arcata Branch Library was built in the city hall parking lot in the place of the two asphalt tennis courts that were built in 1970, on the site of the Baldwin Motordrome midget car race track built in 1959. In the summer of 1991, a major addition was built on Arcata City Hall and a new taller cyclone fence was built behind the outfield wall and scoreboard to protect the windows of the new addition built to accommodate more city elected officials and employees.

Between August 1974 and October 1976, Caltrans expanded Highway 101 from four lanes to eight lanes, so the city had to put up a taller fence in left field to keep home runs off the highway as much as possible. Before the 1976 season, the facility underwent a $41,500 renovation, that included a new field drainage system, reseeded infield and outfield grass, and new lighting and light poles to replace rotting 25 year old light poles.

In April 1977, a new sign was painted on the outside wall, just to right of the main entrance, with a depiction of an 1880s baseball game in the center. That sign was on the ballpark through at least the 1996 season, but was removed in the late 1990s when the deteriorating wood siding was replace and repainted tan.

In May 1978, just weeks before the start of the Humboldt Crabs season, the City of Arcata tore out the redwood grandstand, "condemned by a dry rot problem," and replaced it with new all-aluminum bleachers, for approximately 1500 fans, on a newly poured concrete slab that included a ramp entrance to replace the old stairs. The original estimated cost of $34,600 was exceeded, and the bleaches did not arrive before the start of the season on June 10, 1978, so bleachers were borrowed from St. Bernard's School, and with the cost overruns many of the planned improvements were not made for decades.

A new press booth was built before the start of the 1980 season and dedicated to longtime PA announcer and Times-Standard sports editor Don Terbush. That wooden press booth was used until a new metal media booth was built in front of the old booth in 2019.

On June 13, 2004, the ballpark unveiled a new $30,000 state of the art scoreboard, donated by Pacific Lumber Company, with the score listed out by innings and space for the jersey number of the batter, which replaced the Electro-Mech scoreboard donated by Coca-Cola that was installed sometime before 1981, which only recorded scores, balls, strikes, outs and innings. The current scoreboard was installed in May 2023.

Before the 2007 season, playing with a softball field in right field since the opening of the ballpark, the park was renovated, the softball infield, backstop and mini grandstand were removed, the terrace in centerfield that helped with drainage was leveled out, three rows of addition bleacher seating was added in front of the Judo Hut down the first baseline, a picnic area down the right field line, lawn seating down the left field line, and a remodel of the concessions stand that doubled its size. The field lighting was changed, with the lights on wooden telephone poles, including two poles that were in play, one in left center field and one in right center field, that were installed before the 1976 season, replaced with new steel light towers. During the 2007 renovations, the longstanding fence distance markers of 304 feet to left field, 398 to left center, 367 to right center, 337 to the right power alley, and 306 to right field, were remeasured to their current distances of 307 to left field, 394 to left center, 368 to right center, 338 to the right power alley, and 304 to right field. In 2009, the cyclone fence style steel netting above the backstop was replaced by new modern backstop netting, the sound system was renovated and the wooden ballpark facade was repainted.

Between the 2018 and 2019 seasons, the City of Arcata installed new ADA regulation bleaches, able to seat approximately 909 fans, to replace the old bleachers that would sway every time you stood up and had been in use since 1978. The city has also considered building NCAA regulations dugouts, as the current dugouts are chain-link fence with no roof.

Another ballpark renovation started at the end of the 2024 Humboldt Crabs season and finished in time for the 2025 Humboldt Crabs season. The renovations are funded by a $1 million budget allocation for the City of Arcata secured by California State Senator Mike McGuire in 2022, with additional funding coming from the Humboldt Crabs and the city's Open Space, Parks, Trails Special Tax fund. This new renovation included expanding ADA accessibility to the left field grass seats and replaced the original redwood entrance façade with a new ADA accessible entrance with a brick façade and steel slats.

== See also ==
- Nettleton Stadium
- Harry & David Field
- Kiger Stadium
- Miles Field demolished in 2005
- Tiger Field
- Appeal-Democrat Park
- Travis Credit Union Park demolished 2008
