= Slant Magazine =

American online entertainment magazine

- Website type: Film, music, TV and video games webzine
- Available in: English
- Headquarters: Brooklyn, New York
- Owner: Slant Magazine LLC
- Editors: Ed Gonzalez; Sal Cinquemani
- Website: slantmagazine.com
- Registration: No
- Launched: 2001; 25 years ago
- Current status: Active

Slant Magazine is an American online publication that features reviews of movies, music, TV, DVDs, theater, and video games, as well as interviews with actors, directors, and musicians. The site covers various film festivals like the New York Film Festival.

== History ==
Slant Magazine was launched in 2001. On January 21, 2010, it was relaunched and absorbed the entertainment blog The House Next Door, founded by Matt Zoller Seitz, a former New York Times and New York Press writer, and maintained by Keith Uhlich, former Time Out New York film critic, who was the blog's editor until 2012.

== In the media ==
Slant Magazine's reviews, which A. O. Scott of The New York Times has described as "passionate and often prickly", have occasionally been the source of debate and discourse online and in the media. Ed Gonzalez's review of Kevin Gage's 2005 film Chaos sparked some controversy when Roger Ebert quoted it in his review of the film for the Chicago Sun-Times; The New York Press quoted another Slant Magazine writer, Keith Uhlich, in a review of the Michael Bay film The Island; and Gonzalez, who wrote regularly for The Village Voice film section, was praised by former Voice critic Nathan Lee for his attention to politics and pop culture in a lively and interesting way.

KillerStartups.com, a web community that reviews websites for both entrepreneurs and investors, called Slant Magazine "one of the most influential online sources of news, comment, opinion and controversy in the world of indie, pop and mainstream entertainment." On January 21, 2010, MovieMaker named Slant Magazine's blog, The House Next Door, one of the "50 Best Blogs for Moviemakers", and on January 26, 2010, The House Next Door was named one of "18 obsessive, cantankerous, and unstoppable Gotham blogs worth going ape over" by the Village Voice.

== Rating system ==
Slant Magazine employs two different rating systems for its reviews:

- Films and television programs are rated using the traditional four-star system.
- Albums, DVDs and video games are rated using a five-star system.
