= Nettleton Stadium =

Stadium in Chico, California, US

Coordinates: 39°43′50″N 121°51′12″W

- Interactive map of Nettleton Stadium
- Address: 400 West 1st Street
- Location: Chico, California, U.S.
- Owner: California State University, Chico
- Operator: California State University, Chico
- Capacity: 4,100
- Surface: Natural grass
- Record attendance: 4,699 (4th of July vs Reno Silver Sox)
- Field size: Left Field: 330 ft (100 m); Center Field: 405 ft (123 m); Right Field: 330 ft (101 m)

Construction
- Opened: March 1, 1997; 29 years ago

Tenants
- Chico State Wildcats baseball (NCAA) (1997–present); Chico Heat (1997–2002); Chico Outlaws (2005–2011); Chico Heat (GWL) (2016–2018)

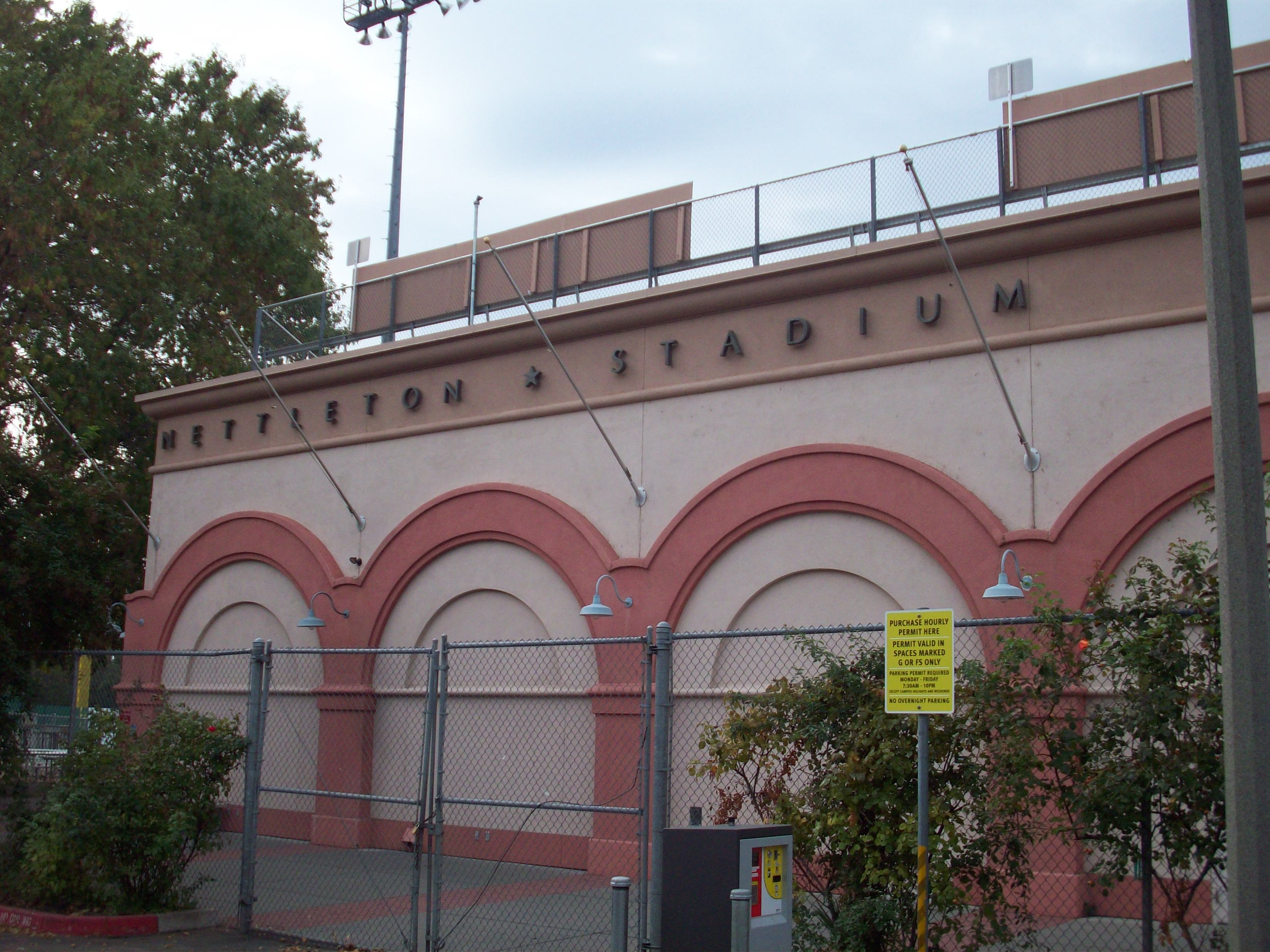
Nettleton Stadium exterior

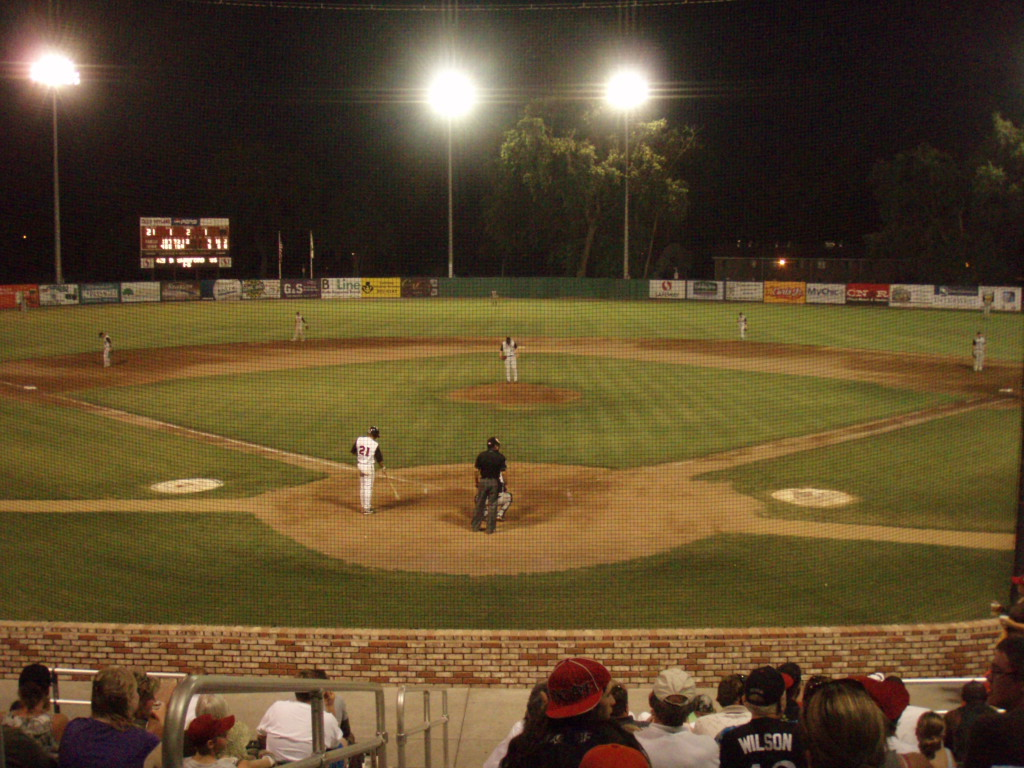
Nettleton Stadium interior and field

Nettleton Stadium is a baseball stadium in Chico, California, on the campus of California State University, Chico. It is the home field for the CSU Chico Baseball team, the Wildcats. It also served as the former home of the now-defunct Chico Heat and the Chico Outlaws professional baseball teams and Chico Heat collegiate wood bat league team. It holds 4,100 people. The stadium was named for the majority owner of the Chico Heat, Steve Nettleton and his wife Kathy Nettleton. The Nettleton family donated the 4.5 million dollar facility to CSU.

"Another attendance record was set a few days later in California as the July 4th game in Chico between the Outlaws and their rival Reno Silver Sox was sold out before the contest. Standing room only tickets quickly sold out at the ballpark bringing a Nettleton Stadium record of 4,699 fans to the game. The demand was so great that over 3,000 additional fans that couldn't get into the event flooded neighboring fields and parking lots to cheer the team through the fences and enjoy the post-game fireworks show."

== See also ==
- Arcata Ball Park
- Harry & David Field
- Kiger Stadium
- Miles Field demolished in 2005
- Tiger Field
- Appeal-Democrat Park
- Travis Credit Union Park demolished 2008

Events and tenants
Preceded by First venue	Host of the GBL All-Star Game; Nettleton Stadium; 2006	Succeeded by Foster Field
