= Southern Oregon Timberjacks =

- 1979–1999; Medford, Oregon

Minor league affiliations
- Class: Class A Short Season (1979–1999)
- League: Northwest League (1979–1999)

Major league affiliations
- Team: Oakland Athletics (1979–1999)

Minor league titles
- League titles (2): 1981; 1983
- Division titles (6): 1981; 1982; 1983; 1984; 1988; 1989

Team data
- Name: Southern Oregon Athletics (1988–1995); Medford Athletics (1979–1987)
- Colors: Green, athletic gold, white (1979-1995); Forest green, grey, white (1996-1999)
- Ballpark: Miles Field
- Owner(s)/ Operator(s): National Sports Organization, Inc.

The Southern Oregon Timberjacks were a minor league baseball team in the northwest United States, based in Medford, Oregon. The team played in the Class A-Short Season Northwest League and were an affiliate of the Oakland Athletics for 21 seasons. They played their home games at Miles Field in south Medford.

== Team history ==
The Timberjacks came to Medford to fill the void left by the departed Medford Giants (1967–1968) and Rogue Valley/Medford Dodgers (1969–1971), both of the Northwest League. Originally known as the Bend Timber Hawks for a season in 1978, owner Doug Emmans relocated the team south and it became the Medford Athletics (or A's) in 1979.

A name change to Southern Oregon Athletics (or A's) came in 1988, and then a new nickname of Timberjacks in 1996 for their last four seasons. They were six-time southern division champions (1981–1984, 1988–1989) and won the league championship twice (1981 and 1983). In 1982, Medford had the highest winning percentage of any team in professional baseball.

In 1982, former minor league pitcher Fred Herrmann was named the team's general manager and then became the team's majority owner in 1985.

As a minor league baseball franchise, the A's and Timberjacks had featured future major league players such as Greg Cadaret, José Canseco, Rod Beck, Scott Brosius, Jason Giambi, Tim Hudson, Terry Steinbach, Jason Windsor, Miguel Tejada, and Eric Byrnes.

== Relocation controversy and stadium demise ==
In 1997 and 1998, Herrmann had announced that the team would relocate to Vancouver, Washington. However, the plans fell through on both occasions and the team remained in Medford.

Finally on October 26, 1999, Herrmann announced that the franchise would relocate to Vancouver, British Columbia, and in 2000, they completed their move and were renamed the "new" Vancouver Canadians. The previous Canadians franchise was the Athletics' Class AAA Pacific Coast League affiliate, which was sold and moved to California and became the Sacramento River Cats. Both teams continued to be affiliated with the Oakland A's until 2011, when the Canadians became affiliated with the Toronto Blue Jays. The current Canadians do not show any history or records of the Timberjacks at their official website, though their relocation is mentioned one time on the media guide page.

Herrmann did attempt to bring a Western Baseball League team to Medford to replace the Timberjacks (Despite long standing rules that prohibited affiliated owners having a financial interest in independent baseball teams). However, those plans fell through when the potential owners, including Herrmann, failed to come up with the money necessary to establish a team. After four years without a professional team and despite efforts to rebuild and restore historic Miles Field, the city of Medford ordered the deteriorating stadium be torn down in 2004 to make way for a new Wal-Mart SuperCenter.

In 2004, the city council of Medford orchestrated an agreement with the new Harry & David Field that a professional team will not be allowed to play at the new ballpark which currently hosts the collegiate wood bat Medford Rogues, the American Legion baseball Medford Mustangs and youth baseball. Despite previous efforts to bring pro baseball back to Medford, the decision stands to this day. The agreement is a moot point as the Northwest League has stated that Medford is not a city that would be considered for expansion.

== Season-by-season record ==
Season	PDC	Division	Finish	Wins	Losses	Win%	Postseason	Manager	Attendance
Medford Athletics
1979	OAK	South	2nd	38	33	.535		Rich Morales	34,656
1980	OAK	South	4th	22	48	.314		Brad Fischer	27,118
1981	OAK	South	1st	42	28	.600	Defeated Bellingham in championship series 2–1	Brad Fischer	54,243
1982	OAK	South	1st	53	17	.757	Lost to Salem in championship series 0–2	Dennis Rogers	58,053
1983	OAK	Oregon	1st	50	18	.735	Defeated Bellingham in championship series 2–0	Dennis Rogers	73,278
1984	OAK	South	1st	45	29	.608	Lost to Tri-Cities in championship 0–1	Dennis Rogers	66,738
1985	OAK	Oregon	4th	33	41	.446		Grady Fuson	64,720
1986	OAK	Oregon	2nd	43	31	.581		Dave Hudgens	70,590
1987	OAK	North	3rd	31	45	.408		Dave Hudgens	72,729
Southern Oregon Athletics
1988	OAK	South	1st	46	30	.605	Lost to Spokane in champion series 1–2	Lenn Sakata	64,974
1989	OAK	South	1st	45	30	.600	Lost to Spokane in champion series 1–2	Grady Fuson	69,641
1990	OAK	South	2nd	40	36	.526		Grady Fuson	69,247
1991	OAK	South	3rd	40	36	.526		Grady Fuson	70,164
1992	OAK	South	3rd	39	37	.513		Chris Pittaro	77,098
1993	OAK	South	3rd	37	39	.487		Dick Scott	78,202
1994	OAK	South	2nd	38	38	.500		Tom Dunton	88,363
1995	OAK	South	4th	33	43	.434		Tony DeFrancesco	84,682
Southern Oregon Timberjacks
1996	OAK	South	4th	29	47	.382		Tony DeFrancesco	77,437
1997	OAK	South	2nd	41	35	.539		John Kuehl	68,757
1998	OAK	South	2nd	43	33	.566		Greg Sparks	71,822
1999	OAK	South	2nd	38	38	.500		Greg Sparks	69,495

Division winner	League champions

== Notable alumni ==
- Rod Beck (1986–1987) 3 x MLB All-Star
- Mike Bordick (1986) MLB All-Star
- Scott Brosius (1987) MLB All-Star; 1998 World Series Most Valuable Player
- Eric Byrnes (1998)
- Greg Cadaret (1983)
- Jose Canseco (1983) 6 x MLB All-Star; 1986 AL Rookie of the Year; 1988 AL Most Valuable Player
- Ron Coomer (1987) MLB All-Star
- Jason Giambi (1992) 5 x MLB All-Star; 2000 AL Most Valuable Player
- Ben Grieve (1994) MLB All-Star; 1998 AL Rookie of the Year
- Tim Hudson (1997) 4 x MLB All-Star; 222 Wins
- Gerald Laird (1999)
- Charlie O'Brien (1982)
- Steve Ontiveros (1982) MLB All-Star; 1994 AL ERA Title
- Craig Paquette (1989)
- Lenn Sakata (1988, MGR)
- Scott Spiezio (1994)
- Terry Steinbach (1983) 3 x MLB All-Star
- Kevin Tapani (1986)
- Miguel Tejada (1995) 6 x MLB All-Star; 2002 AL Most Valuable Player
- Todd Van Poppel (1990)
- Dave Veres (1986)
- Luis Vizcaino (1997)
- Curt Young (1981)

== Former players ==
- Medford A's players (1979–1987)
- Southern Oregon A's players (1988–1995)
- Southern Oregon Timberjacks players (1996–1999)

Preceded by Bend Timber Hawks	Northwest League franchise 1979-1999	Succeeded by Vancouver Canadians
