= Miles Field =

Miles Field may refer to:

- Miles Field (Oregon), a baseball park from 1948 to 2004 in Medford, Oregon
- Miles Field (Virginia Tech), an outdoor athletics venue of Virginia Agricultural and Mechanical College and Polytechnic Institute dating to 1894

== See also ==
- Miles Stadium, a former football stadium at Virginia Agricultural and Mechanical College from 1926 to 1964
