= Feather River Mudcats =

Baseball team from California, United States

The Feather River Mudcats were a minor league baseball team located in Marysville, California. The team played in the independent Western Baseball League, and was not affiliated with any Major League Baseball team. Their home stadium was Bryant Field.

The Mudcats were founded in 2000, when the Reno BlackJacks moved to Marysville and changed their name. The new name created conflict with an older, larger minor league baseball team, the Carolina Mudcats, who demanded a name change. They played only two seasons before ceasing operations after the 2001 season. They were replaced in 2002 by the Yuba-Sutter Gold Sox, which played until the league folded after the season.
