= Southern Cascade League =

The Southern Cascade League was an American high school athletics league based in Southern Oregon. The league was founded in 1928 and folded in 2022. The league consisted of eight teams from schools in Jackson, Josephine, Klamath and Lake Counties. All former member athletic programs in the league are members in good standing of the Oregon School Activities Association, five former member schools compete as Class 3A teams and three former member schools participate as Class 2A teams based on school enrollment.

== Member Schools ==
- Bonanza Jr./Sr. High School Antlers - 2A
- Cascade Christian High School Challengers (private) - 3A
- Chiloquin High School Panthers (boys) / Queens (girls) - 2A
- Illinois Valley High School Cougars - 3A
- Lakeview High School (Oregon) Honkers - 3A
- Lost River Jr./Sr. High School Raiders - 2A
- Rogue River High School Chieftains - 3A
- St. Mary's High School Crusaders (private) - 3A
