= Harry & David Field =

Stadium in Medford, Oregon, US

- Interactive map of Harry & David Field
- Location: 2929 South Pacific Highway; Medford, Oregon
- Coordinates: 42.297°N 122.843°W
- Owner: City of Medford
- Operator: Medford Rogues
- Capacity: 2,178
- Surface: Natural grass

Construction
- Opened: 2005, 21 years ago

Tenants
- Southern Oregon Riverdawgs (2001–2012); Medford Mustangs (American Legion, 2013-present); Medford Rogues (2013–present)

Medford (the United States)
Medford (Oregon)

Harry & David Field is a baseball park in Medford, Oregon.

Adjacent to U.S. Cellular Community Park (now known as Lithia & Driveway Fields), it hosts youth and high school baseball, primarily the American Legion Medford Mustangs and the Medford Rogues, an independent collegiate wood bat team. Named for the Harry & David Corporation, which has its world headquarters located just south of the ballpark, it was the brainchild of local businessman Gary Miller.

Opened 21 years ago in 2005, the ballpark replaced the demolished Miles Field, which was about a mile (1.6 km) up Highway 99, now a Walmart. Construction of the ballpark was never completed, and it is off-limits to professional teams under an agreement reached between the stadium and the city, which allows only amateur baseball and other community events.

It was initially thought that Harry & David Field was a part of the U.S. Cellular Community Park complex, but has been since determined that it is a separate entity. From 2012 to 2013, the stadium underwent a major renovation and expansion to accommodate the new Medford Rogues. The city's last minor league team, the Southern Oregon Timberjacks of the Class A-Short Season Northwest League, arrived in 1979 as the Medford A's. After 21 seasons at Miles Field, they left in October 1999 for British Columbia and became the Vancouver Canadians.

The elevation of the natural grass playing field is approximately 1,420 feet (430 m) above sea level. It is aligned nearly due north (north by east); the recommended orientation (home plate to center field) is east-northeast.

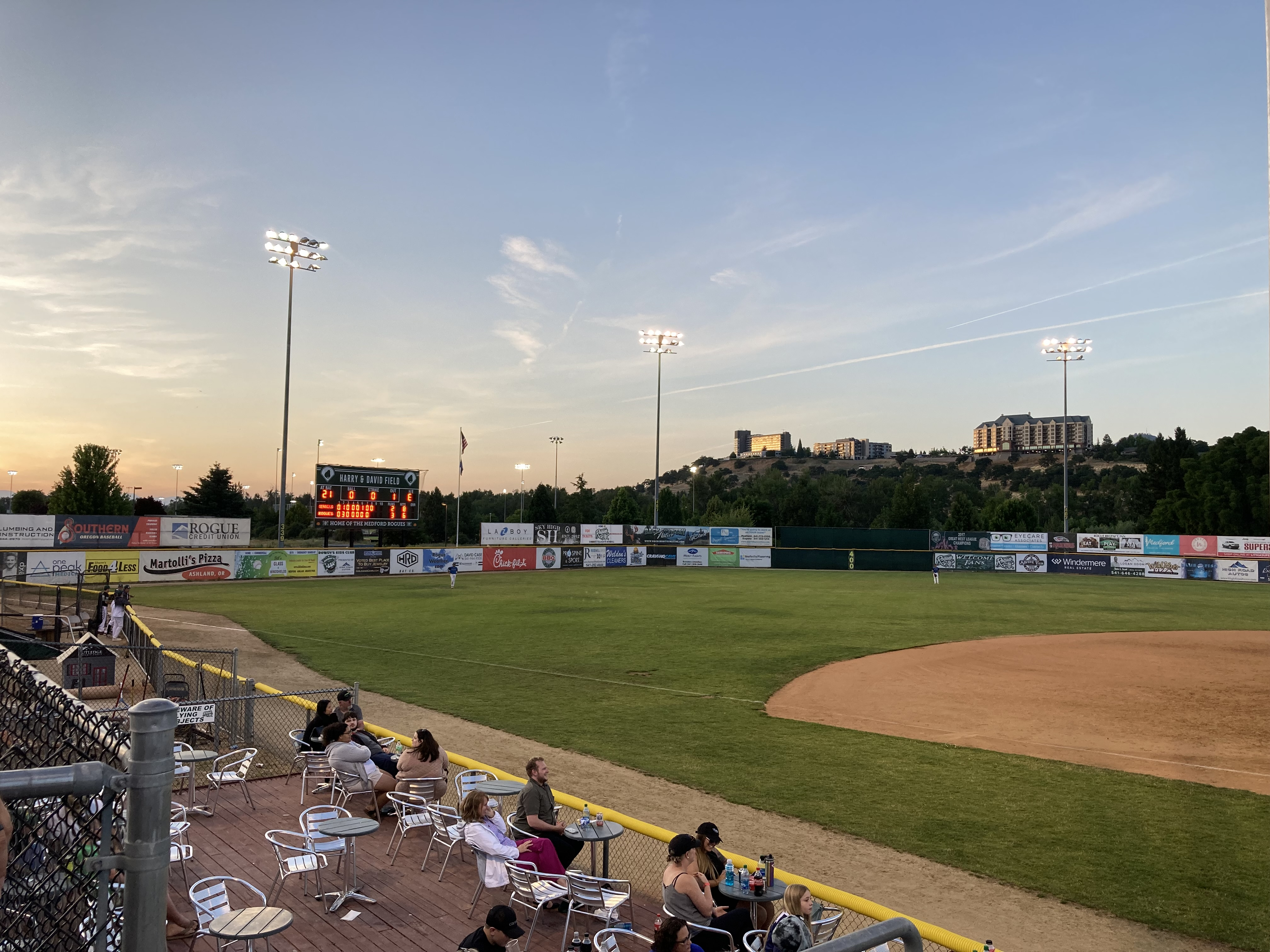
Dusk time at Harry and David Field during a baseball game with the Medford Rogues

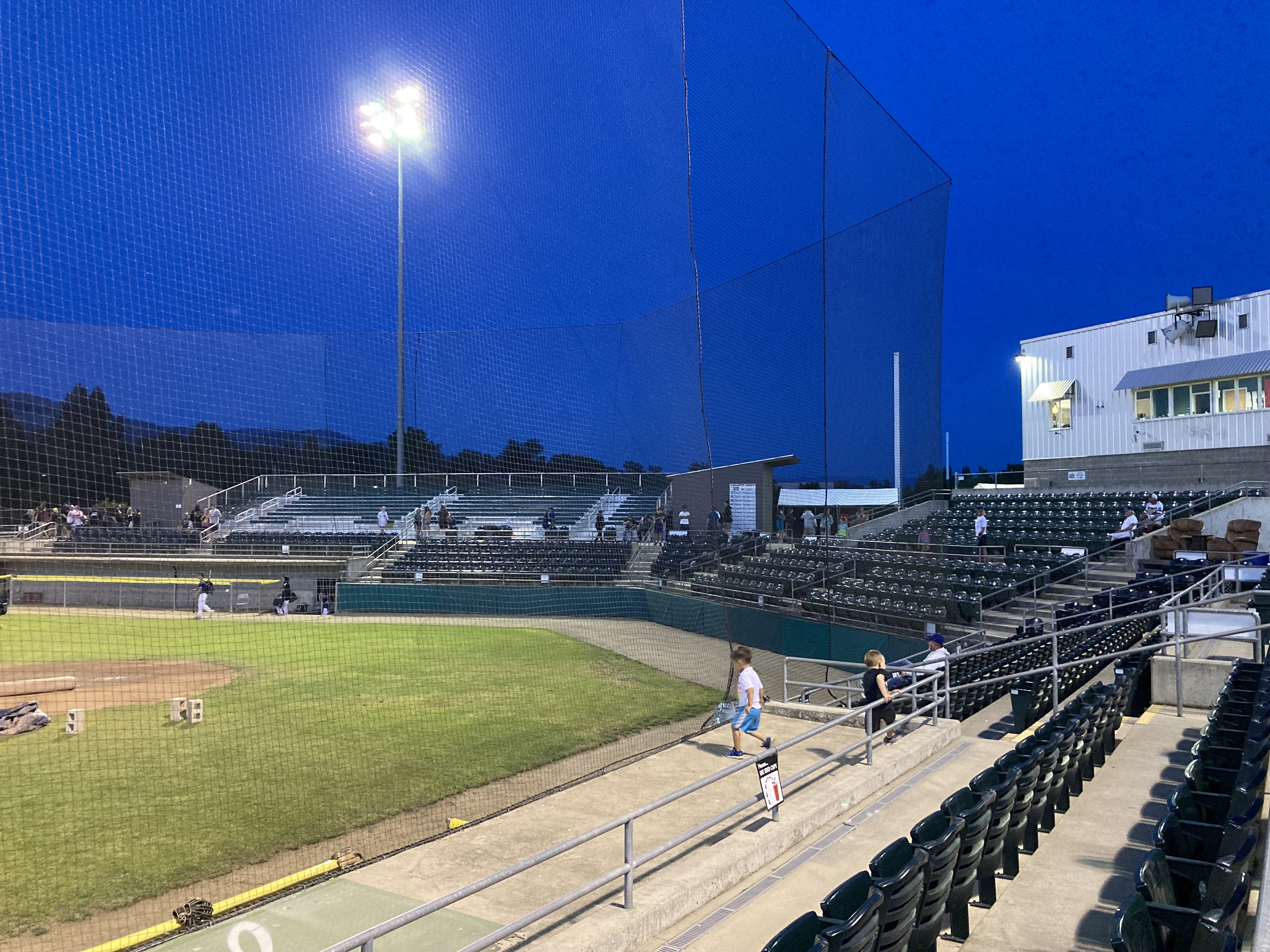
Harry and David Field postgame

== See also ==
- Nettleton Stadium
- Arcata Ball Park
- Kiger Stadium
- Miles Field demolished in 2005
- Tiger Field
- Appeal-Democrat Park
- Travis Credit Union Park demolished 2008
