= Kiger Stadium =

Stadium in Klamath Falls, Oregon

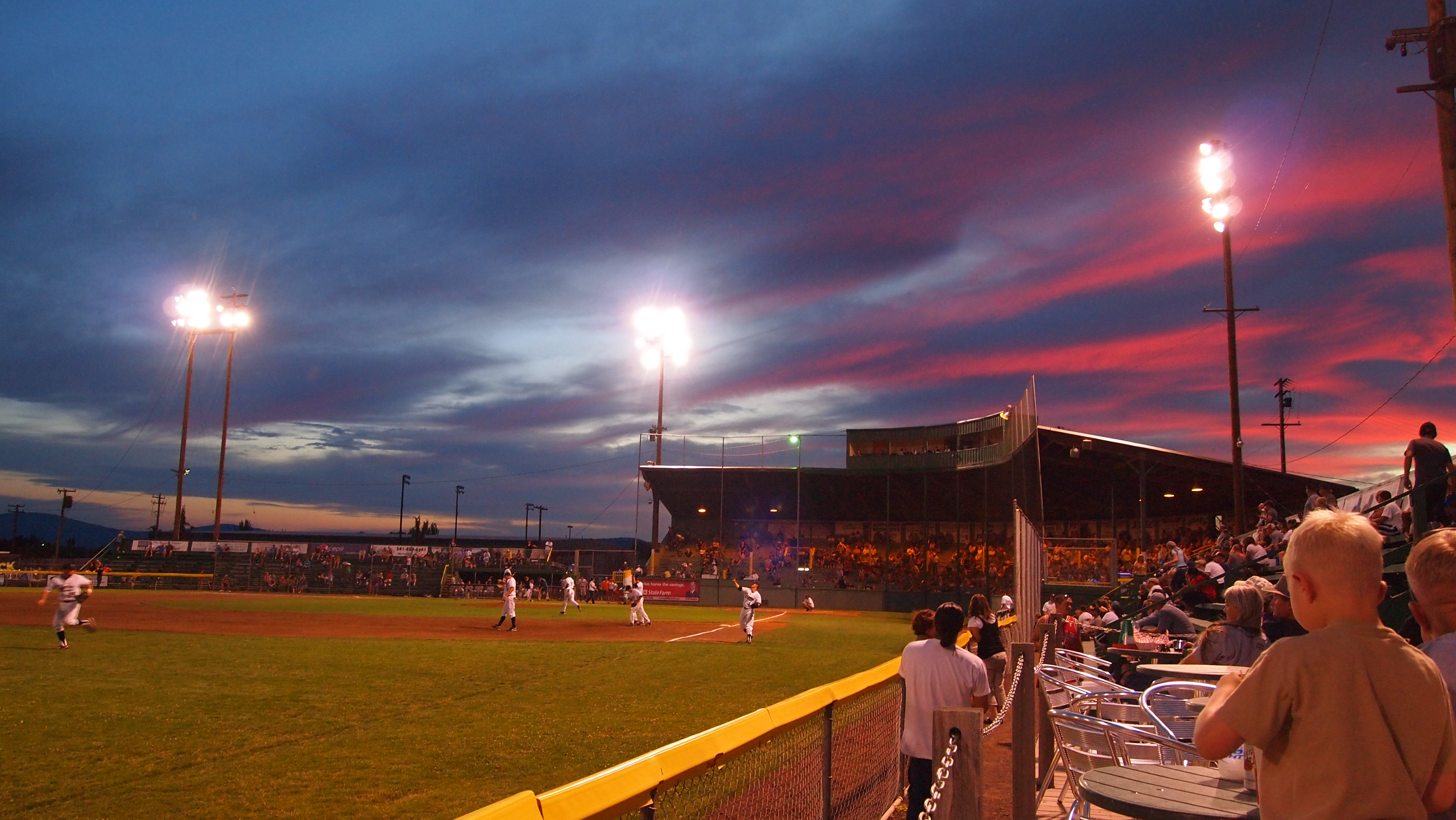
- Interactive map of Kiger Stadium
- Location: Crest Street, Altamont, Oregon, US
- Coordinates: 42.20937°N 121.74136°W
- Capacity: 2,878
- Surface: Natural grass
- Field size: (LF) 325' (CF) 385' (RF) 325'

Construction
- Groundbreaking: 1947
- Opened: 1948

Tenants
- Klamath Falls Gems (1948–1951); Klamath Falls Gems (2011–2018)

Kiger Stadium is a baseball stadium in the Altamont area of Klamath Falls, Oregon, United States.

Construction began in late 1947 at the Crest Street site of Kiger Stadium, with a goal of opening in Spring 1948 for the Class D Klamath Falls Gems, the Far West League farm team of the Philadelphia Phillies. The stadium was built by Klamath Baseball, Inc. and paid for by the sale of stock to local citizens. The opening, and the original Gems, were a huge success, as the team led the league in attendance in three of the four years they were in the League, and won the Far West League's final Championship before the league folded after the 1951 season.

The stadium is one of only two remaining all-wood stadiums in North America. Kiger Stadium has hosted thousands of amateur baseball games, from Little League through American Legion through a semi-pro incarnation of the Gems, through the years. In 1968 the ballpark hosted the Babe Ruth World Series, and in 1970 the American Legion Championships.

For a time in the 1950s, Kiger Stadium was even turned into an auto racing track. Through the years Kiger has seen it all, and in 2011 welcomed the new Klamath Falls Gems of the West Coast League. The Gems gave Klamath Basin families another reason to visit Kiger Stadium, and the success of the Gems and the WCL were to have brought many improvements to Kiger without losing the charm of the original park. (The Gems last played in the Great West League.)

In 2014 the Klamath Falls Gems, had planned minor improvements to Kiger Stadium, such as making the restrooms ADA accessible, and painting the outfield wall, the stadium facades, and stadium bleachers.

== Names that played at Kiger Stadium ==
- Dick Young
- Don Ferrarese
- Niles Jordan
- Bob Bowman
- Troy Herriage
- Bert Convy

== See also ==
- Nettleton Stadium
- Arcata Ball Park
- Harry & David Field
- Miles Field demolished in 2005
- Tiger Field
- Appeal-Democrat Park
- Travis Credit Union Park demolished 2008
