= Bryant Field (stadium) =

Stadium in Marysville, California, U.S.

- Interactive map of Bryant Field
- Former names: Appeal-Democrat Park (2010-2014); All Seasons RV Stadium (2014-2018); Colusa Casino Stadium (2019-2021); Hard Rock Park (2022)
- Location: 1431 C Street; Marysville, California 95901
- Coordinates: 39.1509°N 121.5881°W
- Owner: City of Marysville
- Capacity: 4,000 (current), 3,700 (2000), 1,500 (1937)
- Surface: Natural grass
- Field size: Left Field: 325 ft (99 m); Center Field: 410 ft (120 m); Right Field: 305 ft (93 m)

Construction
- Opened: 1937
- Renovated: 2000
- Cost: 1937 ($35,000), 2000 ($950,000)

Tenants
- Marysville Braves (Far West League) 1948-1949; Marysville Peaches (Far West League) 1950; Yuba City Gold Sox (Far West League) 1951; Feather River Mudcats (Western Baseball League) 2000-2001; Yuba-Sutter Gold Sox (Western Baseball League) 2002; Yuba City Bears (Great West League) 2017; Yuba-Sutter Gold Sox 2003–2022; Marysville Drakes (PL) 2023–2024; Yuba-Sutter Freebirds (PBL) 2025–present

Bryant Field (formerly known as Appeal-Democrat Park, All Seasons RV Stadium, Colusa Casino Stadium and Hard Rock Park) is a stadium in Marysville, California, United States. It reverted to its original name of Bryant Field in 2022.

The stadium is primarily used for baseball. Bryant Field served as the home of the Yuba-Sutter Gold Sox (formerly named the Marysville Gold Sox) from 2002 to 2022, the Marysville Drakes from 2023 to 2024, and the Yuba City Bears of the now-defunct Great West League for the 2017 season. It now plays host to the Yuba-Sutter Freebirds of the Pioneer League, an independent minor baseball league partnered with Major League Baseball. The ballpark has a capacity of 4,000 people. Located on the corner of 14th & B Streets, the stadium has the look and feel of an old-time ballpark with its brickwork trim, sunken dugouts, and outfield wall adorned with billboards.

The stadium served as host for half of William Jessup University's 2015 home baseball schedule.

Bryant Field

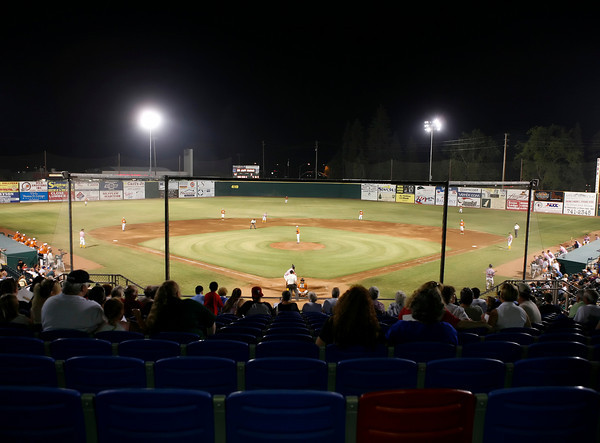
Bryant Field at night

== See also ==
- Nettleton Stadium
- Arcata Ball Park
- Harry & David Field
- Kiger Stadium
- Miles Field demolished in 2005
- Tiger Field
- Travis Credit Union Park demolished 2008
