= Tampa Marauders =

- Full name: Tampa Marauders FC
- Nickname: Marauders
- Founded: 2012
- Ground: Naimoli Family Athletic and Intramural Complex; Tampa, Florida, U.S.
- Capacity: 2,000
- Owners: Kevin Hickling (Majority); Maria Silva (Minority); Jim Pinciotti (Minority)
- Head coach: Saif Alsafeer
- League: Champions Soccer League USA
- 2014: 4th, Sunshine Conference (NPSL); Playoffs: Conference runner-up

The Tampa Marauders was an American soccer club from Tampa, Florida. The club played in the Champions Soccer League USA. Their home games were played in downtown Tampa at the Naimoli Family Athletic and Intramural Complex, on the campus of the University of Tampa.

== History ==
The Tampa Marauders FC joined the National Premier Soccer League (NPSL) for the 2012 season. In 2015 the Marauders joined the new Champions Soccer League as a founding member. On January 5, 2017, the Marauders announced that former midfielder Saif Alsafeer would take over as manager.

== Year-by-year ==
Year	League	Wins	Draws	Loses	Regular season	Playoffs	Open Cup
2013	NPSL	3	3	2	3rd, Sunshine	DNQ	DNQ
2014	NPSL	2	4	4	4th, Sunshine	DNQ	DNQ
2015	CSL USA	3	3	4	4th, 1st Division		DNQ

== Stadium ==
Naimoli Family Athletic and Intramural Complex

== Rivalries ==
The Marauders' main rivalry is with the Cape Coral Hurricanes. The rivalry began in 2013 in a series contested for the Gulf Coast Cup.

== Players ==
Roster as of April 6, 2014

No.	Nation	Position	Player
00	GK	ITA	Gianluca Piagnerelli
1	GK	USA	Eric Sims
4	DF	COL	Oscar Carmona
7	MF	JAM	Cardel Benbow
8	MF	USA	Fernando Gonzalez
9	FW	USA	Dwight Barnett
10	FW	USA	Kareem Escayg
12	DF	USA	Raeshaun Washington
13	FW	DEN	Jonas Bukh
14	MF	USA	Christopher Ruiz
17	FW	JAM	Kenniel Hyde
18	FW	ENG	Santi Alexis
20	DF	USA	Robert Rivers III
21	FW	USA	Zach Hofstetter
22	DF	JAM	Ricardo Webb
24	DF	USA	Jonathan Thompson
26	DF	USA	Sean Sullivan
28	FW	USA	Christopher DiNapoli
30	DF	USA	Frankie Pinciotti
31	MF	USA	Tanner Wolfe
33	DF	GHA	Eddie Ababio
35	MF	USA	Luis Rosado
37	DF	USA	Juan Pablo Reyes
39	FW	USA	Jake Peterson
44	MF	USA	Karl Swan
60	FW	JAM	Kevin King

== Management ==
=== Front office ===
- (Canada) Kevin Hickling – President
- (Venezuela) Maria Silva – Vice President
- (United States) Jim Pinciotti – Vice President

=== Coaches ===
- (United States) Saif Alsafeer – Head Coach
- (United States) Alex Delgado – Assistant Coach

=== Head coaching history ===
- (Trinidad and Tobago) Maurice Loregnard (2013–2014)

== Achievements ==
- Gulf Coast Cup
  - Winners (2): 2013, 2014
