= Ken Medlock =

American character actor

- Born: Kennard Medlock; October 31, 1949 (age 76); Los Angeles, California, U.S.

Kennard Medlock (born October 31, 1949) is an American character actor and former baseball player known for his role in Moneyball. As a player, Medlock was a pitcher for the Decatur Commodores in the 1970s. He later worked as a coach for the St. Paul Saints.

== Filmography ==
=== Film ===
Year	Title	Role	Notes
1979	The Concorde ... Airport '79	American Olympic Athlete	
1985	Brewster's Millions	Dixon	
1987	Extreme Prejudice	Redneck in Bank	
1987	Bulletproof	Jack Benson	
1989	Johnny Handsome	Shipyard Accountant	
1990	Another 48 Hrs.	CHP Officer	
1990	Dying Time	Dying Time	Direct-to-video
1991	Talent for the Game	Scooter Eaton	
1992	American Me	Cop	
1992	Mr. Baseball	Umpire	
1993	Living and Working in Space: The Countdown Has Begun	Baseball Pitcher	Direct-to-video
1994	Major League II	Umpire	
1996	White Cargo	Cop in bar	
1996	Last Man Standing	Strozzi Gang Member	
1998	Major League: Back to the Minors	Twins Assistant Coach	
2002	Undisputed	Guard 1	
2005	Bad News Bears	Umpire	
2005	Chaos	Officer MacDunner	
2007	The Comebacks	Pitching Coach	
2011	Moneyball	Grady Fuson	
2013	Snake & Mongoose	Mr. McWorter	

=== Television ===
Year	Title	Role	Notes
1978	Getting Married	Phil Granetti	Television film
1978	Katie: Portrait of a Centerfold	Sullie's Valet	Television film
1979	Like Normal People	Ray	Television film
1979	The Kid from Left Field	Grosso	Television film
1979	Mirror, Mirror	Ken - Coach	Television film
1980	Fantasy Island	The Spaceship Commander	Episode: "The Love Doctor/ The Pleasure Palace/Possessed"
1981	Knots Landing	Police Officer	Episode: "The Vigil"
1983–1987	Days of Our Lives	Wally / Man on boat	9 episodes
1984	Hart to Hart	Graves	Episode: "The Dog Who Knew Too Much"
1987–1988	ABC Afterschool Special	Coach	2 episodes
1990	CBS Schoolbreak Special	Coach James	Episode: "The Fourth Man"
1999	The X-Files	White Coach	Episode: "The Unnatural"
2003	7th Heaven	Umpire	Episode: "Baggage"
2004	Clubhouse	Umpire / Umpire #1	2 episodes
2006	The Shield	Umpire	Episode: "Man Inside"
2009	Numbers	Referee	Episode: "12:01 AM"
2016	NCIS: Los Angeles	Volunteer	Episode: "Crazy Train"
