= Grady Fuson =

American baseball scout and executive (born 1956)

Oakland Athletics
- Born: April 19, 1956 (age 70); San Diego, California

Grady Lee Fuson (born April 19, 1956) is an American professional baseball scout and executive who is a special adviser for the Oakland Athletics of Major League Baseball.

== Early life and education ==
Fuson grew up in Kearny Mesa, San Diego. He attended Kearny High School. Fuson played college baseball for a junior college before transferring to the University of Puget Sound, where he finished his college career with the Puget Sound Loggers in Division I of the National Collegiate Athletic Association (NCAA). He graduated in 1978.

== Career ==
Fuson played professional baseball for the Salem Senators, an independent team. He led the Senators with a .320 batting average in 1978, but batted .198 in 1979. He was assistant baseball coach for Puget Sound in 1980 and became head coach in 1981, the youngest coach in NCAA's Division I. Before the 1982 season, the Oakland Athletics hired Fuson as an area scout for the Pacific Northwest and to coach for the Idaho Falls A's. Through 1995, he scouted and coached for various Oakland farm teams. In 1985, he became manager of the Medford A's.

Fuson was Oakland's director of scouting from 1995 to 2001. The Texas Rangers hired Fuson as assistant general manager on November 1, 2001, alongside John Hart as the new general manager, with the agreement that Fuson would succeed Hart after the 2004 season. Fuson was put in charge of the entire farm system. Despite the agreement, the Rangers chose to retain Hart as their general manager for 2005, and dismissed Fuson.

In 2005, the Padres hired Fuson as a special assistant to the general manager, Kevin Towers. He became a vice president of scouting and player development. The Padres fired Fuson after the 2009 season, when they hired Jed Hoyer as their general manager. In 2010, he returned to Oakland as an adviser on scouting and player development. In 2017, Fuson won the Sheldon "Chief" Bender Award, given for service in player development, and the Scout of the Year Award, presented annually at the Winter Meetings.

== Personal life ==
Fuson was portrayed in Moneyball by Ken Medlock. In the movie, Oakland Athletics’ General Manager Billy Beane fires Fuson, though in reality, Fuson appreciated Beane's approach and left for Texas voluntarily.
