= Dobbins Stadium =

Baseball stadium in Davis, California

Coordinates: 38.54195°N 121.75752°W

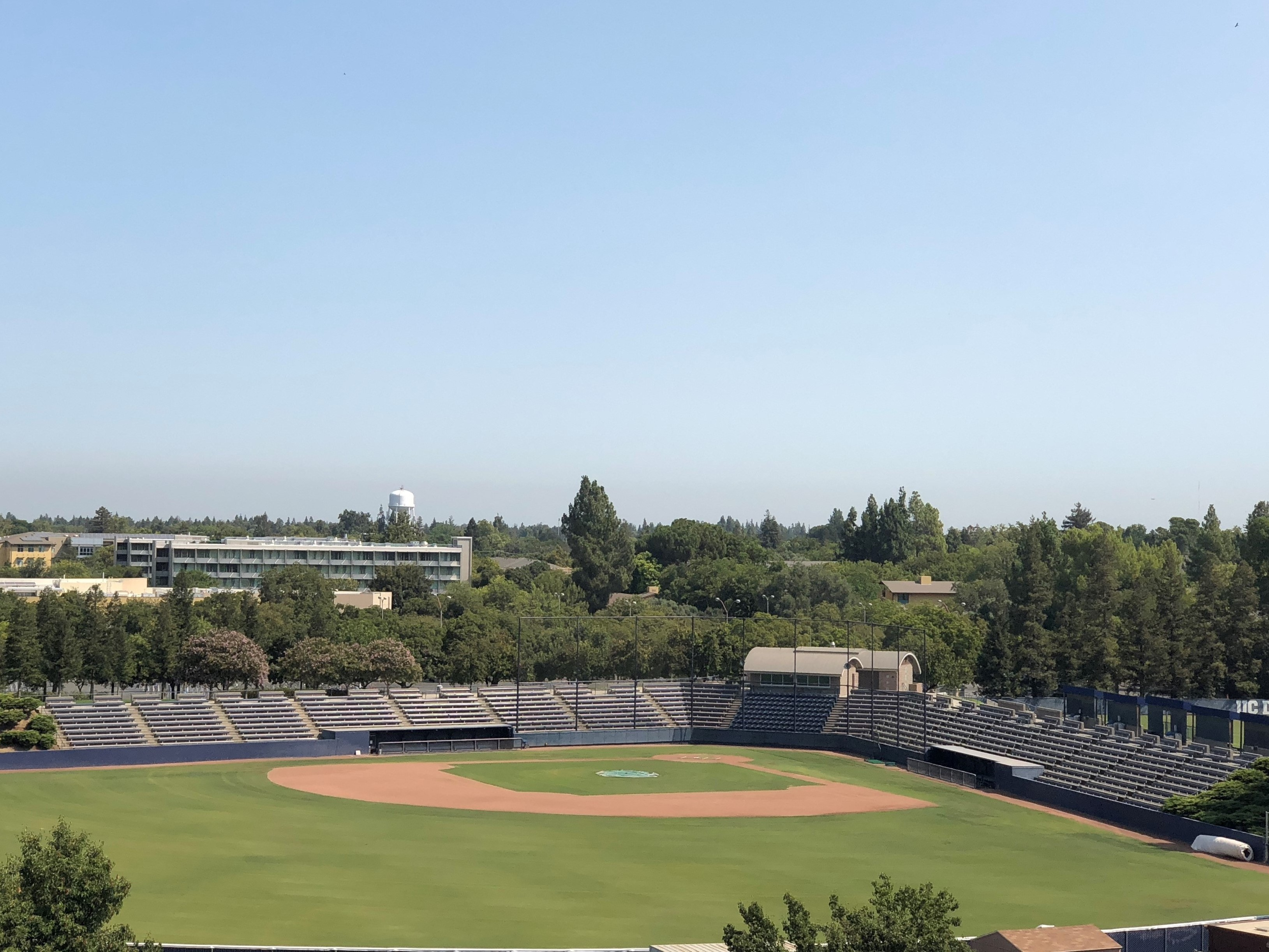
- Interactive map of Dobbins Stadium
- Former names: Community Stadium
- Location: Davis, California, United States
- Owner: University of California, Davis
- Operator: UC Davis Athletics Department
- Capacity: 3,500
- Surface: Natural grass
- Scoreboard: Electronic
- Field size: Left Field: 310 ft (94 m); Left-Center: 385 ft (117 m); Center Field: 410 ft (125 m); Right-Center: 385 ft (117 m); Right Field: 310 ft (94 m)

Construction
- Opened: 1986
- Renovated: 2002

Tenants
- UC Davis Aggies baseball (NCAA); Yolo High Wheelers (PBL) (2024–present)

Dobbins Stadium is a baseball stadium in Davis, California.

It is the home field of the UC Davis Aggies baseball team and served as the home park for the Yolo High Wheelers during their inaugural season in the Pioneer Baseball League. The stadium holds 3,500 spectators and opened in 1986.

== See also ==
- List of NCAA Division I baseball venues
