= Solano Thunderbirds =

Solano Thunderbirds
Founded	2003
Ballpark	Travis Credit Union Park
Based in	Vacaville, California
Team Colors	Maroon, Navy Blue and White
Division
League	Sierra Baseball League

The Solano Thunderbirds were an independent collegiate wood bat baseball team based in Vacaville, California, in the United States. They were owned by Curtis, Susan and Bryant Stocking and played their home games at Travis Credit Union Park in Vacaville. They were members of the Sierra Baseball League and the Horizon Air Summer Series. Their first season was 2003, and 2006 or 2007 seems to have been their last.

They succeeded the Western Baseball League's Solano Steelheads as Travis Credit Union Park's primary tenant but never shared in the excitement or crowds enjoyed by Bruce Portner's Steelheads, drawing fewer than 100 people to most of its games.

Due to poor management, the Thunderbirds ran up debt in the millions of dollars and were forced to close down the franchise, leaving Vacaville with no baseball team.

Notable alumni include World Series starter Doug Fister.
