= Tiger Field (baseball stadium) =

Stadium in Redding, California

- Interactive map of Tiger Field
- Location: 1250 Parkview Ave; Redding, California 96001
- Coordinates: 40.574996°N 122.385002°W
- Owner: City of Redding
- Capacity: 1,200
- Surface: Natural grass
- Field size: Left Field: 320 ft (98 m); Center Field: 430 ft (131 m); Right Field: 310 ft (94 m)

Construction
- Opened: 1923
- Renovated: 1955-1956 (fire, temporary bleachers, new orientation), 1980s (removal of grandstand), 2014 (addition of stadium seating)

Tenants
- Redding Tigers; Redding Browns (Far West League) (1948-1951); Chico Outlaws (2011) 5 games Redding Colt 45s (2004–present)

Tiger Field is a former Minor League Baseball venue in the Western United States, located in Redding, California. Opened in 1923, it is the home of the summer collegiate Redding Colt 45s. The ballpark is named for its first tenant, the semi-pro Redding Tigers. Tiger Field is on the corner of Market Street and Cypress Ave.

The stadium has gone through many renovations over the years. In the 1940s and 1950s, the stadium had a large wooden grandstand. Soon after the folding of the Redding Browns and a fire in the grandstands in 1955, the grandstands were torn down and the stadium orientation was flipped so that the current location of home plate is in the original location of right field.

In 2016 the stadium received a major upgrade and face lift. The field was re-sodded, the backstop was moved up, new backstop nets were installed, new stadium seats from the former Travis Credit Union Park in Vacaville, California, were installed, and the dugouts were renovated and expanded.

== See also ==
- Nettleton Stadium
- Arcata Ball Park
- Harry & David Field
- Kiger Stadium
- Miles Field demolished in 2005
- Appeal-Democrat Park
- Travis Credit Union Park demolished 2008
