= Medford Dodgers =

- 1969–1971; Medford, Oregon

Minor league affiliations
- Class: Class A-Short Season
- League: Northwest League

Major league affiliations
- Previous teams: Los Angeles Dodgers

Minor league titles
- League titles (1): 1969

Team data
- Previous names: Rogue Valley Dodgers (1969)
- Colors: Dodger blue, white
- Ballpark: Miles Field

The Medford Dodgers were a minor league baseball team based in Medford, Oregon, that played in the Class A-Short Season Northwest League from 1969-1971. Prior to 1970, the club played as the Rouge Valley Dodgers.

== History ==
Rogue Valley Baseball, Inc. was awarded a Northwest League franchise to play in Medford. The club affiliated with the San Francisco Giants. Utilizing their parent club's namesake, the Medford Giants played for two season from 1967-1968. The club changed affiliations to the Los Angeles Dodgers in 1969 and became the Rogue Valley Dodgers for a season. In late July 1969 the franchise was sold to Ashland businessman Cleatis Mitchell. The Dodgers finished the season with a record of 50-29 to claim the Northwest League championship. Following the season the Rogue Valley name was dropped in favor of Medford. Half way into the 1971 season the club was in financial trouble. Owner Cleatis Mitchell sought financial assistance for the Los Angeles Dodgers in the amount of $6000. Without additional funding the club would cease operations. The Dodgers received the necessary funding played in Medford through the 1971 season.

The Dodgers moved their Northwest League affiliate to Spokane in 1972, which had been their AAA team in the Pacific Coast League since 1958, when they moved from Brooklyn to Los Angeles.

Spokane returned to the Pacific Coast League in 1973 as the Texas Rangers affiliate and the Dodgers moved their Northwest League affiliation west to Bellingham.

The Northwest League returned to Medford and Miles Field in 1979 when the Bend Timber Hawks moved south after one season in central Oregon and became the Medford A's.

== Season-by-season record ==
Season	PDC	Division	Finish	Wins	Losses	Win%	Postseason	Manager	Attendance
Rogue Valley Dodgers
1969	LAD		1st	50	29	.633	Northwest League champion by virtue of record	Bill Berrier	23,696
Medford Dodgers
1970	LAD	South	3rd	36	44	.450		Bill Berrier	19,687
1971	LAD	South	3rd	34	46	.425		Bill Berrier	12,930

Division winner	League champions

Preceded by Medford Giants	Northwest League franchise 1969-1971	Succeeded by Ceased operations
