= Pacific Premier League =

Pacific Premier League (PPL)
- Founded: 2015
- Country: United States
- Confederation: US Club Soccer; United States Soccer Federation
- Number of clubs: 6
- Domestic cup: U.S. Open Cup
- Current champions: Yuba City FC Alliance (2016)
- Website: pacificpremiersoccer.com

The Pacific Premier League (PPL) is a men's outdoor soccer league that was formed in 2015 consisting of men's amateur soccer clubs. The league is sanctioned by US Club Soccer, an affiliate of US Soccer. Clubs are eligible to compete in the US Open Cup through US Club Soccer qualification.

== History ==
Formed in 2015, the PPL is a regional soccer league based in Northern California. The founding member clubs included Chico City Rangers FC, CVU Blackhawks, Del Paso Phantoms FC, Glenn County FC Barnstormers, Reno-Tahoe Forest FC, and Yuba City FC Alliance.

The inaugural season was played in 2016 beginning in April and concluding with the PPL Cup championship in June. On June 11, 2016 Yuba City FC Alliance won the first-ever PPL Cup defeating Glenn County FC Barnstormers in the final 3-1. The championship match was played on the grounds of the Glenn County Fair in Orland, California.

Three new clubs were added for the 2017 season: Bay Area United, Redding Royals FC and Southern Oregon Starphire FC.

== Clubs ==
Club	City	Stadium
Bay Area United FC	Pittsburg, CA	Central Park
Chico City Rangers FC	Chico, CA	Degamo Park
Glenn County FC Barnstormers	Orland, CA	Glenn County Fair
Redding Royals FC	Redding, CA	Redding Soccer Park
Southern Oregon Starphire FC	Ashland, OR	U.S. Cellular Community Park
Yuba City FC Alliance	Maryville, CA	Yuba College Sports Complex

=== Former member clubs ===
- CVU Blackhawks (2016)
- Del Paso Phantoms FC (2016)
- Reno-Tahoe Forest FC (2016)

== Champions ==
Season	Winner	Runner up	Result
2016	Yuba City FC Alliance	Glenn County FC Barnstormers	3-1
2017			

== See also ==
- Texas Premier Soccer League
