= Rogue River High School =

Public school in Oregon, United States

Rogue River Jr/Sr High School

Location
- 1898 East Evans Creek Road; Rogue River, (Jackson County), Oregon 97537; United States; 42.456133°N 123.168009°W

Information
- Type: Public
- School district: Rogue River School District
- Principal: Dan Smith
- Teaching staff: 22.38
- Grades: 7-12
- Enrollment: 355 (2023–2024)
- Student to teacher ratio: 15.86
- Colors: Forest green, gold and black
- Athletics conference: OSAA Sunset Conference 3A-4
- Mascot: Chieftain
- Website: Rogue River High School

Rogue River Jr/Sr High School is a public high school located in Rogue River, Oregon, United States.

== Academics ==
In 2008, 83% of the school's seniors received a high school diploma. Of 84 students, 70 graduated, six dropped out, and eight were still in high school the following year.

== Athletics ==
Rogue River's high school athletic program began around the time the school did. The mascot is the Chieftain and the team colors are forest green and gold. Athletic teams are referred to as the "Chiefs" (boys) and "Lady Chiefs" (girls). The athletic director is Jennifer Bakker.

The school is a member in good standing of the Oregon School Activities Association, and participates in the Southern Cascade League. All teams currently play in Class 3A based on school enrollment.

Track and field started at the high school with a state meet appearance in 1931, where Ralph Fredricks won the state meet in the pole vault with a vault of 11 feet (3.4 m).

Since 1931 there have been a total of 27 boys' state champions and 16 girls State Champions The girls at Rogue River, as well as most of the schools in the state, have only been competing in the state championship in track and field since 1968. The girls have also had four state record holders, and were the first girls' team to win back-to-back state championships. Kitsy Hall broke the National High School javelin record in 1977 with a throw of 165 feet (50 m).
