= Tanner Wolfe =

American soccer player (born 1985)

Personal information
- Full name: Tanner Wolfe
- Date of birth: September 17, 1985 (age 41)
- Place of birth: Dunedin, Florida, U.S.
- Height: 5 ft 7 in (1.70 m)
- Positions: Midfielder; forward

Team information
- Current team: Tampa Marauders
- Number: 31

Youth career
- 2004–2008: Stetson Hatters

Senior career*
Years	Team	Apps	(Gls)
2007–2009	Central Florida Kraze	42	(10)
2010	Bradenton Academics	4	(0)
2010	Carolina Dynamo	9	(4)
2011	Wilmington Hammerheads	13	(1)
2014–?	Tampa Marauders	8	(1)
- * Club domestic league appearances and goals as of July 7, 2014

Tanner Wolfe (born September 17, 1985) is an American former soccer player.

== Career ==
=== College and amateur ===
Wolfe played his collegiate career at Stetson University from 2004 to 2008, appearing in 75 out of 75 games and posted 33 career goals, 18 assists, and 84 total points.

During his college career, Wolfe played with USL Premier Development League club Central Florida Kraze during their 2007, 2008, and 2009 seasons and with the Bradenton Academics during the 2010 season.

=== Professional ===
Wolfe signed his first professional contract in March 2011, joining USL Pro club Wilmington Hammerheads. He made his professional debut on May 21, 2011, coming on as a second-half substitute in a 3–0 win over Charleston Battery.
