= Solano Steelheads =

- 1999–2003; Sacramento, California

Minor league affiliations
- League: Western Baseball League

Team data
- Previous names: Sacramento Steelheads (1999)
- Previous parks: Travis Credit Union Park; Sacramento City College

The Solano Steelheads were a minor league baseball team in Vacaville, California. They played in the independent Western Baseball League and were not affiliated with any Major League Baseball team, although four of the players in the 2002 season were mayoral candidates in the Golden One Bank Capital Election.

The Steelheads were founded in 1999 as the Sacramento Steelheads by a businessman, Bruce Portner. They played their inaugural season at Sacramento City College. Portner sought to attract attention to the new franchise by hiring the notorious MLB star Pete Rose as "the hitting instructor" of the team.

The Steelheads were relatively successful in the WBL standings in 1999. Sacramento's sports fans largely chose to ignore the home venue, which was located on the college grounds, and hence, prevented from serving alcohol. Many area baseball fans were content to wait for the relocation of the Pacific Coast League Vancouver Canadians to Raley Field.

Rather than contend directly with AAA-level baseball, Portner moved his team west to Vacaville, where he built Travis Credit Union Park on the grounds of the historic Nut Tree. Marketing efforts portrayed the team as a Rockwellian slice of Americana, and Solano County fans responded positively to a professional team of their own. The 2000 and 2001 seasons were successful, in terms of both attendance and profit. 2001 saw a renovation of Travis Credit Union Park that included replacing benches with bucket seating. The ballpark was further improved by the start of the 2002 season with a new permanent concession facility and picnic area.

Due to the City of Vacaville's failure to honor the promised removal of a significant financial condition imposed on Portner when he built the stadium with his own money, Portner was forced to sell the stadium at a fire sale price and ultimately had to place the team in bankruptcy to reorganize its debts.

Legal issues and financial obligations became overwhelming and coupled with the decline of the Sonoma County Crushers, another of the WBL flagship organizations, the Western Baseball League was dealt a critical blow, and folded shortly after the 2002 season.

The Solano Thunderbirds, a college league team succeeded the Steelheads as Travis Credit Union Park's primary tenant but has never shared in the excitement or crowds enjoyed by Portner's Steelheads drawing fewer than 100 people to most of its games.

Due to the poor management of the Solano Thunderbirds owned by Curtis, Susan and Byrant Stocking, they ran up a debt of millions of dollars and were forced to close down the Thunderbirds leaving Vacaville with no baseball team.
