= Bill Berrier =

- Manager
- Born: April 21, 1938 (age 87); Harrisburg, Pennsylvania
- Bats: Right Throws: Right
- Stats at Baseball Reference

William F. Berrier (born April 21, 1938) is a former baseball manager.

He managed in the Los Angeles Dodgers minor league system for 10 years from 1966 to 1976. His career managerial record was 1,023-496, a winning percentage of .675. He won the Northwest League championship with the Rogue Valley Dodgers in 1969. Prior to his extensive managerial career, he played in the Dodgers farm system from 1960 to 1967. After leaving the Dodgers organization, Berrier was the head coach and athletic director at Juniata College until he retired in 2007. He was named to the Juniata College Hall of Fame in 1995, and the Middle Atlantic Conferences Hall of Fame in 2016.

== Teams managed ==
- Jamestown Dodgers (1966)
- Dubuque Packers (1967)
- Daytona Beach Dodgers (1968)
- Rogue Valley Dodgers (1969)
- Medford Dodgers (1970–1971)
- Spokane Indians (1972)
- Bellingham Dodgers (1973–1976)
