= San Francisco Seals (collegiate baseball) =

San Francisco baseball club

- Logo

Information
- League: Independent (2019-present)
- Location: Alameda, California
- Ballpark: College of Alameda Stadium
- Founded: 1985
- League championships: 0
- Division championships: 0
- Former league(s): Great West League (2017-2018), Western Baseball Association (1990s)
- Colors: Navy Blue, Sky Blue, White
- Ownership: Abel Alcantar
- General manager: Abel Alcantar
- Manager: Abel Alcantar
- Website: sfsealsbaseball.com

The San Francisco Seals are a summer collegiate wood-bat club based in Alameda, California and represent the San Francisco Bay Area. Established in 1985, they joined the Great West League in 2017 having replaced the Yuba City Bears who went dormant the same day the Seals were announced as new members. The Seals play their home games at College of Alameda Stadium.

== Team history ==
The current Seals team was named after the former minor league baseball team that played in the Pacific Coast League from 1903 to 1957 at practically ALL levels of play. This team was founded by Abel Alcantar, who was a high school baseball coach at the time. He was approached by a local scout who suggested that he form a summer team for the San Francisco Public School System. So Alcantar founded the San Francisco Seals 18 & Under team. The following year he founded a 16 & Under team as well. In 1987, Alcantar continued the tradition and formed a team for those over the age of 18. Alcantar owned and funded these teams individually; he received some coaching support, but no financial assistance. All three clubs were maintained until the early 90s when he decided to concentrate his efforts on the 18 & Over collegiate team. These days the Seals are once again expanding into teams from the youth levels all the way to collegiate level. Coach Alcantar has a well qualified coaching career and has also been fortunate enough to be a professional baseball scout for few MLB clubs. Some of the places he has had coaching stints at are City College of San Francisco, Skyline College, Laney College, and Cal State East Bay. The Major League Baseball teams he was an associated scout for included the Milwaukee Brewers and New York Mets.

On November 7, 2017, the GWL announced that the Seals were joining the GWL replacing the Yuba City Bears for 2018. After the 2018 season, the GWL folded and the Seals became an independent team playing non-league schedules.

== Year-by-year record ==
Year	League	Affiliation	Record	Finish	Manager	Playoffs
2018	Great West League	none	21-33	4th	Abel Alcantar	missed playoffs

== Notable alumni ==
To be announced

== Coaching staff ==
- Abel Alcantar - Head Coach
- Isias Alcantar - Assistant Coach
- Todd Surdez - Assistant Coach
- Joe Kuschell - Pitching Coach
- TBD - Athletic Trainer

== Radio broadcasts ==
To be announced...
