= Cascade Christian High School =

Cascade Christian

Location
- 855 Chevy Way; Medford, Jackson County, Oregon 97504; United States; 42.3625°N 122.8807°W

Information
- Type: Private Christian
- Opened: 1974
- School district: Grace Cascade Christian Schools
- Superintendent: Erik Ritschard
- Principal: Toby Walker
- Grades: 9-12
- Enrollment: 280
- Colors: Purple and Gold
- Athletics conference: OSAA Southern Cascade League 3A-4
- Mascot: Challenger
- Team name: Cascade Christian Challengers
- Rival: Saint Mary's School
- Accreditation: Association of Christian Schools International and Northwest Accreditation Commission
- Website: http://www.gracechristian.org

Cascade Christian High School is a private Christian high school in Medford, Oregon, United States.

== History ==
Cascade Christian High School was founded in 1977 by Grace Christian Schools, originally a ministry of the First Baptist Church, and was housed at the historic Jacksonville School building for over ten years. The school's first graduating class was in 1981, but Grace Christian Schools turned the high school over to a group of dedicated parents to operate it separately.

== Athletics ==
Cascade Christian's high school athletic program began around the time the school did in 1977. The mascot is known as the "Challengers" and the team colors are purple and gold. The "Challenger" is a warrior-type character based out of the Bible.

The school is a member in good standing of the Oregon School Activities Association and participate in the Southern Cascade League and Sunset Conference. Their football and basketball team won the OSAA Class 2A State Championship in 2006–07, as well as the 3A Basketball championship in 2008–09, 2021–22, 2022-23. Their baseball team won the OSAA Class 3A State Championship in 2012. All teams currently play in Class 3A based on school enrollment.

Varsity football, boys basketball and some baseball games are carried on the radio by KDOV-FM 91.7, The Dove with Jim McCoy and Mark McLemore on the call.
