= Medford Giants =

- 1967–1968; Medford, Oregon

Minor league affiliations
- Class: Class A-Short Season
- League: Northwest League

Major league affiliations
- Previous teams: San Francisco Giants (1967–1968)

Minor league titles
- League titles (1): 1967

Team data
- Colors: Black, orange, white
- Ballpark: Jackson County Ballpark
- Owner(s)/ Operator(s): Rouge Valley Baseball, Inc.

The Medford Giants were a minor league baseball team based in Medford, Oregon. The Giants were members of the Class A-Short Season Northwest League from 1967-1968 and were an affiliate of the San Francisco Giants.

== History ==
In early 1967 it was announced that Rouge Valley Baseball, Inc. had secured a Northwest League franchise. The club signed a player development contract with the San Francisco Giants. Adopting their parent club's moniker the club began to play in the summer of 1967 as the Medford Giants. In their innagural season the Giants finished with a record of 51-33. The Giants and Eugene Emeralds were in a dead heat down the stretch. Medford swept the Tri-City Atoms in a season finale double-header to finish one game ahead of Eugene in the standings to claim the Northwest League pennant.

There was uncertainty about whether the franchise would remain in Medford due to a dispute over ballpark rent. Jackson County Commissioners sought to raise rent, an increase that owner Joseph Graham strongly opposed. The county agreed to maintain the same rental rate, which secured the Giants return for the 1968 season. After the completion of the season, citing a lack of available players, San Francisco ended their affiliation with Medford. Medford signed on with the Los Angeles Dodgers and became the Rogue Valley Dodgers.

== Season-by-season record ==
Season	PDC	Division	Finish	Wins	Losses	Win%	Postseason	Manager	Attendance
Medford Giants
1967	SFG		1st	51	33	.607	Northwest League champion by virtue of record	Tony Eichelberger	43,478
1968	SFG		3rd	34	43	.442		Harvey Koepf	20,585

Division winner	League champions

== Notable alumni ==
- George Foster (1968) 5 x MLB All-Star; 1977 NL Most Valuable Player
- Gary Lavelle (1968) 2 x MLB All-Star

Preceded by Expansion franchise	Northwest League franchise 1967-1968	Succeeded by Rogue Valley Dodgers
