= Southern Oregon Starphire FC =

- Full name: Southern Oregon Starphire FC
- Founded: 2000 (as Southern Oregon Fuego)
- Dissolved: 2018
- Ground: Walter A. Phillips Field @ Ashland High School; Ashland, Oregon; Spiegelberg Stadium; Medford, Oregon
- Capacity: 1,700
- Owner: Garin Coster; Juan Ibarra
- League: United Premier Soccer League

Southern Oregon Starphire FC was an American soccer team based in Medford, Oregon, United States. The team played in the Pacific Premier League (PPL), a regional amateur league based in Northern California, and then later in the United Premier Soccer League.

The team played its home games at Walter A. Philips Field at Ashland High School in Ashland, Oregon, and Spiegelberg Stadium in Medford, Oregon.

== History ==
Founded by Jay Coster in 2000 as Southern Oregon Fuego, the club existed as an exhibition team for approximately ten years before joining the NPSL in 2009. Southern Oregon regularly hosted exhibition matches against teams such as the Cascade Surge of the USL PDL, local college teams or collections of area all-stars.

In 2009 it was announced that the Fuego would be playing as a member of the National Premier Soccer League in the Western Division.

In their first NPSL season Southern Oregon Fuego made the divisional playoffs while posting a 4-7-1 record and finishing fourth in the Western Division. Fuego were eliminated in the semifinal losing to eventual NPSL champion Sonoma County Sol 4–1. The club left NPSL after two seasons, competing in non-league matches. They would later change ownership.

As of 2018, the Starphire FC became members of the United Premier Soccer League. The team has since folded.

== Season-by-season ==
Year	League	W-D-L	Regular season	Playoffs	Open Cup
2009	NPSL	4-7-1	4th, Western	Divisional Semifinals	Did not enter
2010	NPSL	0-9-0	6th, Northwest	Did not qualify	Did not enter

== Head coaches ==
- (United States) Dave Kaufman (2009–2012)
- (United States) Caleb Peterson (2013-2014)
- (United States) Eisa Tiaa Tutu (2016-2017)

== Stadium ==
- US Cellular Community Park; Medford, Oregon (2009–present)
