= Klamath Falls Gems (collegiate wood bat baseball) =

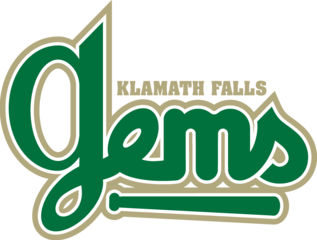
- Logo

Information
- Location: Klamath Falls, Oregon
- Ballpark: Kiger Stadium
- Founded: 2011
- Folded: 2018
- League championships: 0
- Division championships: 0
- Former name: None
- Former leagues: West Coast League (2011-2015); Golden State Collegiate Baseball League (2016-2017); Great West League (2017–2018)
- Colors: Black, Dark Green, Old Gold and White
- Mascot: Tater
- Ownership: Joe O'Connor
- Manager: Nick Gauna (head coach)
- Media: KLAD-AM (radio, internet); Herald and News (newspaper)
- Website: http://www.kfallsgems.com

The Klamath Falls Gems were a collegiate wood bat baseball team based in Klamath Falls, Oregon. They began as an expansion team in the West Coast League in 2011 and played their home games at Kiger Stadium, which is also the home of the Oregon Tech Owls. They were named after the former Class-D Far West League affiliate of the Philadelphia Phillies that played from 1948 to 1951. They previously played in the Golden State Collegiate Baseball League from 2016 to 2017 and were members of the Great West League, having joined that league in October 2017 and played during the 2018 season. They were without a league as the GWL suspended operations on October 4, 2018, and have eventually ceased operations themselves without notice. The owner Joe O'Connor was being given until December 31, 2018, to renew the lease or the team will be considered defunct. There was no response and the franchise was officially folded as of 2019.

== History ==
The Gems were founded in 2011 by a group of local sports personalities including longtime Oregon Tech Owls men's basketball coach and athletic director Danny Miles, Howard Morris, Don Gresdel and Eric Baker. They named Chuck Heeman as the team's inaugural general manager. They were named for the original Klamath Falls Gems that played in the original Far West League from 1948 to 1951.

== Front office staff ==
- Joe O'Connor - Owner
- Nick Winstead - Assistant General Manager

== Broadcasting ==
All games, home and away, were broadcast live on KLAD-AM 960 & FM 99.3 ESPN Radio and streamed live at the station's website.

== Year-by-year records ==
=== West Coast League ===
Year	League	Affiliation	Record	Finish	Manager	Playoffs
2011	West Coast League	none	19-35	4th, West	N/A	missed playoffs
2012	West Coast League	none	26-28	4th, West	N/A	missed playoffs
2013	West Coast League	none	25-29	3rd, South	Mitch Karraker	missed playoffs
2014	West Coast League	none	15-39	5th, South	Mitch Karraker	missed playoffs
2015	West Coast League	none	15-41	5th, West	N/A	missed playoffs

=== Golden State Collegiate Baseball League ===
Year	League	Affiliation	Record	Finish	Manager	Playoffs
2016	Golden State Collegiate Baseball League	none	17-27	5th	N/A	missed playoffs
2017	Golden State Collegiate Baseball League	none	24-20	5th	Daulton Hanks	missed playoffs

=== Great West League ===
Year	League	Affiliation	Record	Finish	Manager	Playoffs
2018	Great West League	none	20-34	5th	Nick Gauna	missed playoffs
