= Chaos (2005 horror film) =

2005 American film

- Theatrical release poster
- Directed by: David DeFalco
- Written by: David DeFalco
- Produced by: Steven Jay Bernheim
- Starring: Kevin Gage; Stephen Wozniak; Kelly K.C. Quann; Maya Barovich; Chantal Degroat; Sage Stallone
- Cinematography: Brandon Trost
- Edited by: Peter Devaney Flanagan; Marc Leif
- Production company: Dominion Entertainment
- Distributed by: Dominion Entertainment; Dinsdale Releasing
- Release date: August 10, 2005
- Running time: 74 minutes
- Country: United States
- Language: English
- Box office: $20,166

Chaos is a 2005 American horror film written and directed by David DeFalco and starring Kevin Gage. A film about the rape and murder of two adolescent girls, it is an unofficial remake of Wes Craven's The Last House on the Left, with all character names changed and a different ending. It The film received negative reviews, in particular for its use of gore and the ending.

== Plot ==
Emily's friend Angelica invites her to a rave party in the woods. Emily's parents, Leo and Justine, tell her she must return by midnight or call if she's going to be late. At the party, Angelica asks Swan, another party guest, for ecstasy. Swan says he has some in a nearby cabin, where his friends live, and the girls agree to accompany him there. They are unaware that Swan's friends are actually his father Chaos — a notorious and wanted criminal — Chaos's girlfriend Daisy and felon Frankie, and that Chaos has sent Swan to the party to lure unsuspecting women to him.

At the cabin, Emily and Angelica are captured by the gang and taken deep into the woods. The girls manage to escape from their captors and split up to make themselves harder to find. Angelica is caught by Daisy and brought before Chaos, who tortures her, stabs her to death, and violates her corpse. After sunset, the gang finds Emily, who steals Daisy's knife in a struggle and stabs Swan viciously in the genitals. Rather than letting his son bleed to death, Chaos suffocates him and promises to murder Emily in revenge.

Justine becomes nervous about Emily's whereabouts and convinces Leo to call the police, although she suspects that local police officer MacDunner won't take her seriously because he is racist towards her family. Justine and Leo head into the woods to search for the girls themselves, and find Angelica's corpse. They return to their home.

Chaos and Frankie recapture Emily and bind her with rope. Chaos tortures her to death by cutting her anus and genitals, but cannot rape her as a result. The gang prepares to leave the area, but Chaos's van fails to start, forcing them to abandon it and search for a car to steal. The van is then found by MacDunner and his partner Wilson, who discover blood-stained clothes within.

The gang heads to a nearby house to steal the car, unaware that they have arrived at Emily's home. Leo lets Chaos and his group inside, but notices that Daisy is wearing Emily's belt. Suspecting the group of being involved with Emily's disappearance, Leo calls the police, while Chaos and Frankie prepare to hot-wire his car and kill the couple.

Chaos is confronted by a shotgun-wielding Leo, demanding answers about Emily. In the meantime, Frankie has captured Justine, and brings her to Chaos, distracting Leo. Chaos disarms Leo and takes the shotgun, shooting Daisy when she tries to persuade him to leave the house. In the ensuing confusion, the couple escape.

Leo finds a chainsaw and attacks, killing Frankie and disarming Chaos of his shotgun. Before Leo can shoot him, MacDunner and Wilson arrive and order Leo to drop his weapon. When Leo hesitates, MacDunner fatally shoots him. Justine grabs Wilson's gun and shoots MacDunner in the back. Wilson disarms Justine, but Chaos shoots him and then Justine. Chaos's laughter is heard over the closing credits.

== Cast ==
- Kevin Gage as "Chaos"
- Stephen Wozniak as Frankie
- Kelly K.C. Quann as Daisy
- Maya Barovich as Angelica
- Chantal Degroat as Emily
- Sage Stallone as Swan
- Deborah Lacey as Justine
- Scott Richards as Leo
- Ken Medlock as Officer MacDunner
- Jeb Barrows as Officer Wilson

== Critical response ==
On the review aggregator website Rotten Tomatoes, 5% of 19 critics' reviews are positive. Metacritic, which uses a weighted average, assigned the film a score of 1 out of 100, based on nine critics, indicating "overwhelming dislike". It is the lowest-reviewed film on the site.

Joshua Land of The Village Voice wrote, "The reference point is obviously Wes Craven's Last House on the Left, but Chaos lacks the audience-implicating boldness or howling political outrage of that landmark; where Last House was provocative, Chaos is merely disgusting."

The sole positive review for Rotten Tomatoes' listings came from Ken Fox of TV Guide's Movie Guide, who gave it 2½ out of 4 stars and said, "Unlike so many other Last House on the Left rip-offs, this virtual remake is reasonably well shot and convincingly acted."

=== Roger Ebert ===
Chaos received some publicity from Roger Ebert's zero-star review and the filmmaker's response. Ebert wrote in his initial review that "Chaos is ugly, nihilistic, and cruel – a film I regret having seen. I urge you to avoid it. Don't make the mistake of thinking it's 'only' a horror film, or a slasher film. It is an exercise in heartless cruelty and it ends with careless brutality."

DeFalco responded with a full-page letter in the Chicago Sun-Times, saying in part, "Mr. Ebert, how do you want 21st-century evil to be portrayed in film and in the media? Tame and sanitized? Titillating and exploitive? Or do you want evil portrayed as it really is? 'Ugly, nihilistic and cruel', as you say our film does it?"

Ebert replied to DeFalco in the article "Evil in film: To what end?", with "In a time of dismay and dread, is it admirable for filmmakers to depict pure evil? Have 9/11, suicide bombers, serial killers and kidnappings created a world in which the response of the artist must be nihilistic and hopeless? At the end of your film, after the other characters have been killed in sadistic and gruesome ways, the only survivor is the one who is evil incarnate, and we hear his cold laughter under a screen that has gone dark. [...] Your answer, that the world is evil and therefore it is your responsibility to reflect it, is no answer at all, but a surrender." Ebert also argued that, "Your real purpose in making Chaos, I suspect, was not to educate, but to create a scandal that would draw an audience. There's always money to be made by going further and being more shocking. Sometimes there is also art to be found in that direction, but not this time."

== See also ==
- Rape and revenge film
