= Greg Sparks =

American baseball player and coach

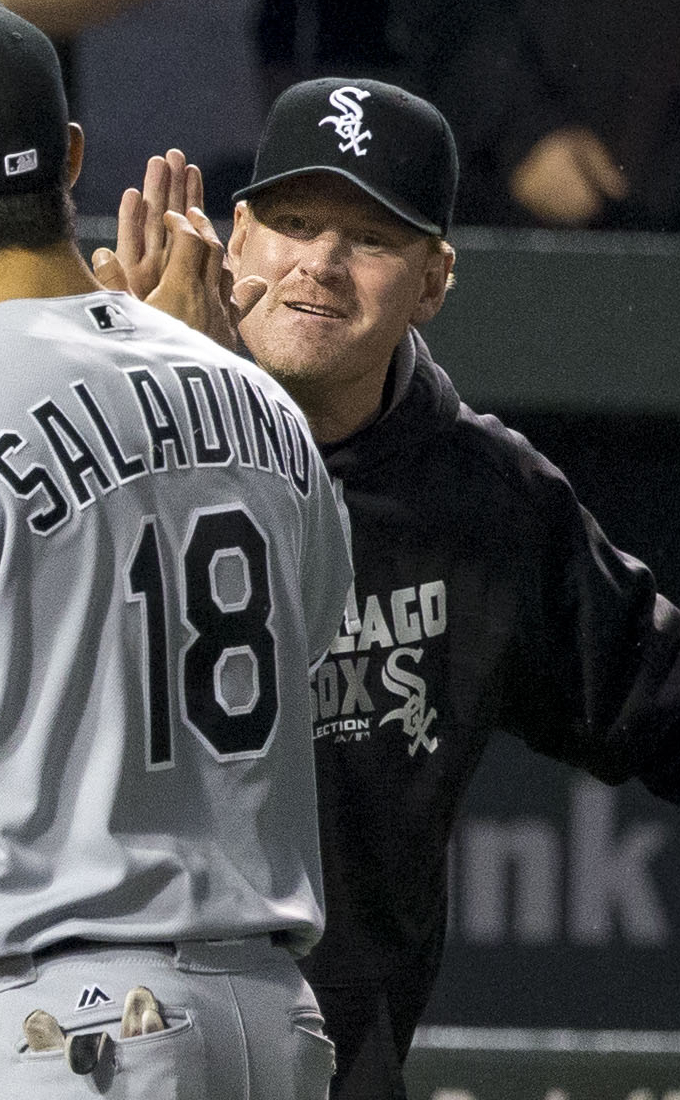
- Sparks as a coach for the Chicago White Sox in 2016
- Coach
- Born: March 31, 1964 (age 60); Chandler, Arizona, U.S.
- Bats: Left Throws: Left

Teams
- Chicago White Sox (2016–2019)

Joseph Gregory Sparks (born March 31, 1964) is an American professional baseball coach and a former minor league player and manager. In 2016, Sparks was named assistant hitting coach for the Chicago White Sox of Major League Baseball, a position he held through 2019.

== Career ==
Born in Chandler, Arizona, he is the son of Joe Sparks, a retired professional baseball player, coach, manager and scout. Greg Sparks served as a batboy for the White Sox in 1979 (when his father spent part of that year on the club's coaching staff), and was present on Disco Demolition Night. He went on to attend Mesa Community College, then forge a 13-year playing career, mostly at the Double-A level. In 1992, he hit 25 home runs as a member of the London Tigers of the Eastern League. An outfielder and first baseman, he threw and batted left-handed, stood 6 feet (1.8 m) tall and weighed 185 pounds (84 kg).

He worked for the Oakland Athletics' organization for 19 years, beginning in 1997, as a minor league manager and hitting coordinator. The White Sox hired him as their assistant hitting coach after the 2015 season.
