= Yuba-Sutter Freebirds =

American minor-league professional baseball team

- Founded in 2024; Marysville, California

Minor league affiliations
- Class: Independent
- League: Pioneer League

Minor league titles
- League titles (1): 2024

Team data
- Colors: Black, blue, brown, orange, yellow
- Ballpark: Bryant Field
- Owner(s)/ Operator(s): Yuba Sutter Baseball Club, LLC
- General manager: Harrison Shapiro
- Website: freebirdsbaseball.com

The Yuba-Sutter Freebirds, formerly the Yuba-Sutter High Wheelers and Yolo High Wheelers, are an independent baseball team based in Marysville, California that started play in the Pioneer League in 2024. In their inaugural season, they defeated the Glacier Range Riders in the 2024 Pioneer League Championship.

== History ==
High Wheelers logo (2024-2025)

On January 23, 2024, the High Wheelers were announced as the newest member of the Pioneer League. The High Wheelers signed an agreement with UC Davis to play at the university's Dobbins Stadium, which used temporary lights for the first season.

The team's name was chosen for the prominence of bicycling within Davis, and the fact that the city is the location of the United States Bicycling Hall of Fame.

On November 22, 2024, the team announced it would be moving to Marysville, California to play the 2025 season at Bryant Field. Following the 2025 season, on February 12, 2026, the team changed its name from High Wheelers to Freebirds.

The team’s rebranding as the Yuba-Sutter Freebirds, including its name, visual identity, mascot, and uniforms, was developed by the agency Project 13 in partnership with Innovation Baseball Partners. The identity draws inspiration from the history, culture, and independent spirit of the Yuba-Sutter region.

== Roster ==
Yuba-Sutter Freebirds roster
Active (25-man) roster		Coaching staff
Pitchers: 32 Kris Anglin; 21 Ethan Bates; 20 Mason Bryant; 27 Cole Cressend; 44 Jayden Drake; 37 Sam Drumheller; 14 Scott Ellis; 23 Andrew Garcia; 30 Jonah Jenkins; 38 Matthew Kavanaugh; 24 Andrew LaCour; 33 Nate Madej; 28 Chase Martinez; 6 Brandon McPherson; 35 Christian Womble; 22 Brett Wozniak; 17 Jack Zalasky; Utility players: 10 Josh Duarte	Catchers: 36 Mike Campagna; 25 Adam Juran; Infielders: 2 Kirkland Banks; 34 Cuba Bess; 5 Parker Coddou; 15 Connor Denning; 11 Bobby Lada; Outfielders: 7 Leyton Barry; 19 Gio Brusa; 4 Cooper Hext; 9 River Orsak; 21 Landon Wallace	Manager: 3 Billy Horton; Coaches: 12 Gary Davenport (bench); 57 Jerome Williams (pitching); Disabled list; ‡ Inactive list; § Suspended list; updated 2025-06-29
