= KETQ-LP =

Radio station in Yuba City, California

- Yuba City, California; United States
- Broadcast area: Yuba-Sutter Metroplex
- Frequency: 93.3 MHz
- Branding: 93Q-munity Radio

Programming
- Language: English
- Format: Community radio

History
- First air date: January 29, 2015

Technical information
- Licensing authority: FCC
- Facility ID: 194914
- Class: L1
- ERP: 88 watts
- HAAT: 32 meters (105 ft)
- Transmitter coordinates: 39°08′22.0″N 121°35′19.6″W

Links
- Public license information: LMS
- Webcast: Listen live
- Website: 93Qradio.com

KETQ-LP (93.3 FM) is an American radio station licensed to serve the community of Yuba City, California. The station's broadcast license was issued in February 2015.

== Programming ==
KETQ-LP broadcasts a community radio format including a mix of eight decades of music, plus local community events. The station is the home of Fish, Gary and Shamaya in the morning in which they interview local business owners, civic organizers, community leaders, and everyday people who are making a difference in the lives of this community. 93Q is also an outlet for local sports. They broadcast the Yuba Sutter HighWheeler's Home games and the station brought local high school baseball back to the radio in 2015. The station is heard live on the internet via Tune-In and LIVE 365 - look for KETQ or ask your Alexa, "Play KETQ".

Air Staff

1. Morning Show - 6 to 9 AM Fish, Gary and Shamaya
2. Drive Home Show - The Drive Home Guy is Bob Day 4 to 6 PM
3. Weather - Kurt Baird
4. Weekend Programs:

Saturday at 9:00 Root Notes with your host Gary Jensen. 2:00 to 4:00 City Harbor (Yacht Rock) With your host Capt. Pablo Cruise

== History ==
This station received its original construction permit from the Federal Communications Commission on August 20, 2014. The new station was assigned the KETQ-LP call sign by the FCC on December 16, 2014. KETQ-LP received its license to cover from the FCC on February 9, 2015.

== See also ==
- List of community radio stations in the United States
