= Miles Field (Oregon) =

Former baseball park in Medford, Oregon

- Interactive map of Miles Field
- Former names: Jackson County; Baseball Park (1948–1969)
- Location: 1801 S. Pacific Hwy, Medford, Oregon, US
- Coordinates: 42.310°N 122.857°W
- Capacity: 4,500 (1971); 3,300 (1988); 2,900 (1995)
- Surface: Natural grass
- Field size: Left Field: 334 ft (102 m); Center Field: 384 ft (117 m); Right Field: 344 ft (105 m)

Construction
- Opened: 1948
- Demolished: 2004

Tenants
- Medford Nuggets (FWL) (1948–1949); Medford Rogues (FWL) (1950–1951); Medford Giants (NWL) (1967–1968); Rogue Valley Dodgers (NWL) (1969); Medford Dodgers (NWL) (1970–1971); Medford A's (NWL) (1979–1987); Southern Oregon A's (NWL) (1988–1995); So. Oregon Timberjacks (NWL) (1996–1999)

Medford (the United States)
Medford (Oregon)

Miles Field was a baseball park in Medford, Oregon, It hosted high school, American Legion, and minor league teams from 1948 to 2004.

The professional teams that played at this facility included the Medford Nuggets/Rogues of the Far West League in 1948–1951 and three Northwest League teams, the Medford Giants in 1967 and 1968, the Rogue Valley/Medford Dodgers from 1969 to 1971, and the Medford/Southern Oregon A's – Southern Oregon Timberjacks franchise from 1979 through 1999.

== History ==
In 1951, local auto dealer Claude "Shorty" Miles worked behind the scenes to help get a new baseball park built in Medford because of his unbridled passion for the sport. A suspicious fire destroyed the structure in early July, but it was quickly rebuilt. Originally known as Jackson County Baseball Park, it was rededicated as "Miles Field" in June 1969, eight months after his death.

It was known as "Jackson & Perkins Gardens at Miles Field" during the mid to late 1990s, because of the ballpark's relationship with Bear Creek Corporation, now the Harry & David Corporation.

At the south end of the city, Miles Field was a block north of Garfield Street, between Highway 99 and Interstate 5. The elevation of the natural grass playing field was approximately 1,400 feet (430 m) above sea level and aligned east-northeast (home plate to center field), the recommended orientation.

== Demise of the stadium ==
After 21 seasons at the venue, the Timberjacks left Medford in October 1999 for British Columbia and became the Vancouver Canadians, leaving the city without a pro baseball franchise. The field continued with use by high school and American Legion teams, and despite efforts to both raise funds to remodel the stadium and to bring in a new team to play there. It was torn down in 2004 to make way for a controversial new Walmart Super Center that was delayed and eventually opened in 2012.

In 2006, Harry & David Field was constructed just down the street from the old Miles Field site. Under an agreement between the venue and the city of Medford, that field was built to accommodate youth, high school, and American Legion baseball, but not a professional team.

The Miles Field site remained empty and unoccupied due to the legal battle over the site which involved the Medford City Council, Walmart, and the Medford Citizens for Responsible Development. In 2009, the Oregon Land Use Board of Appeals ruled to block the project temporarily on June 4 until a traffic study was prepared. The city council appealed that ruling soon after.

However, despite the MCRD's best efforts to block construction, the Oregon Supreme Court ruled in favor of Walmart in 2010 on November 18, and the new Supercenter got the go-ahead to be built. The court overturned a decision by the state's Land Use Board of Appeals to do a traffic study. Construction started on the new Walmart in early 2012 and was completed that summer. A plaque commemorating Miles and the field are in a small courtyard just outside the store entrance.

== See also ==
- Nettleton Stadium
- Arcata Ball Park
- Harry & David Field
- Kiger Stadium
- Tiger Field
- Appeal-Democrat Park
