= Ellis Lake =

Man-made lake

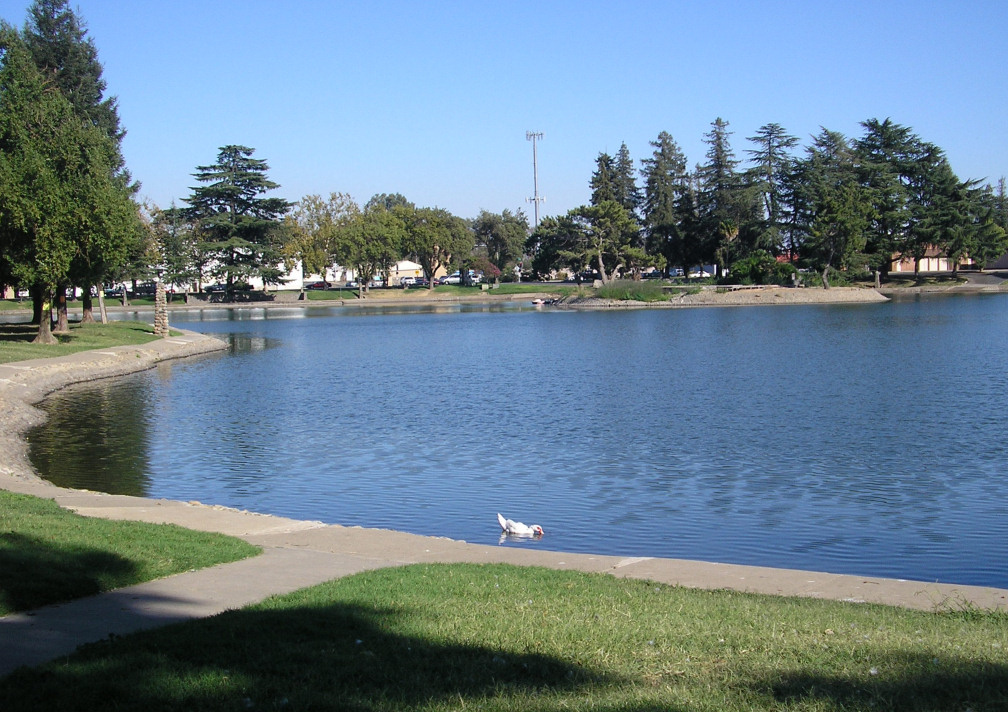

- Location within California Location within the United States
- Location: Marysville, California
- Coordinates: 39°08′52″N 121°35′14″W
- Type: reservoir
- Basin countries: United States

Located in Marysville, California, Ellis Lake is a man-made lake. The lake is bounded by 9th street to the South, B Street to the East, 14th Street to the North and D Street to the West.

== History ==
Ellis Lake was once a spillway of the Feather River. It wasn't until 1924 that the Women's Improvement Club of Marysville commissioned John McClaren, designer of the Golden Gate Park in San Francisco, to turn the swamp into a lake. The project was completed in 1939. The lake was named for Marysville citizen W.T. Ellis, Jr..

Work on the lake was completed during the Great Depression through President Franklin Roosevelt's New Deal Plan.

Work included landscaping, construction of two tennis courts and a judging stand, a 20-ft. concrete and native stone bridge connecting the mainland with an island in the lake, a dock and boat landing 39, rubble rock electroliers for night illumination; and the installation of an ornamental fountain and rubble walls on the banks.

== See also ==
- List of lakes in California
