= St. Mary's School (Medford, Oregon) =

Catholic high school in Oregon, US

Location
- 816 Black Oak Drive; Medford, Jackson County, Oregon 97504; United States; 42°18′51″N 122°50′11″W

Information
- Type: Private, Coeducational
- Religious affiliation: Roman Catholic
- Established: 1865
- Superintendent: Ryan Bernard
- Principal: James Meyer
- Grades: 5–12
- Hours in school day: 7:30 AM - 4:30 PM
- Colors: Navy Blue, Kelly Green and White
- Mascot: Crusaders
- Website: https://smschool.us/

St. Mary's School is a coeducational, independent Roman Catholic college preparatory school in Medford, Oregon within the Archdiocese of Portland. St. Mary’s School was founded in 1865 as a boarding and day school to serve pioneering families throughout southern Oregon and northern California. Today, it provides a college preparatory curriculum for students in grades 5-12. The 24-acre campus is located in east Medford.

According to Niche, St. Mary's School is the most highly ranked Catholic High School in Oregon, the 2nd most highly ranked boarding school in Oregon, and the 3rd most highly ranked private school in Oregon.

== History ==
St. Mary's School was founded in the mining town of Jacksonville, Oregon, in 1865 by three members of the Sisters of the Holy Names of Jesus and Mary and was known as St. Mary's Academy. Operating as a twelve-year (the upper grades were limited to girls) boarding and day school serving families in Southern Oregon and Northern California, St. Mary's graduated its first student in 1871.

St. Mary's moved to Medford, Oregon in 1908. In the late 1920s, the school became coeducational, graduating its first male student in 1930. In 1948, the Sisters of the Holy Names of Jesus and Mary transferred the title of the school to the Sacred Heart Parish, which operated it as a twelve-year coeducational school for the next 13 years. In 1961, St. Mary's Elementary and High School separated into two schools when the current high school was built on Black Oak Drive.

In 1971, when the Sacred Heart Parish determined it could no longer financially support two schools, a group of supporters raised funds and gained permission from the Archbishop to incorporate as an independent, Catholic school, the first in Oregon.

With the Archbishop's permission, St. Mary's added a middle school in 1987 after a fire damaged the Sacred Heart School and representatives of the parish and greater community asked the Board of Trustees to transfer the seventh and eighth grades to the school. A sixth grade was added in 1992.

In 1998, St. Mary's began its first capital expansion in 31 years with a five-phase building campaign. Since 1998, St. Mary's completed an expanded parking facility, an all-weather eight-lane track and upgraded athletic fields and a library/media and science center with three science labs and seven additional classrooms.

== Accreditation ==
St. Mary's School is registered with the Oregon Department of Education and is accredited by the Northwest Accreditation Commission and the Pacific Northwest Association of Independent Schools. Also, the School is a member of the National Association of Independent Schools, the National Catholic Education Association, and other professional organizations.

== Academics ==
St. Mary's won the Oregonian Cup in 2007, 2008, 2009, 2010, 2011, 2016, 2017, and 2022.

The school offers 24 Advanced Placement courses, including three foreign languages: Latin, Spanish, and Mandarin.

Sophomores and Eighth Graders complete the International Schools' Assessment, which offers schools a form of international benchmarking.

In August 2008, St. Mary's received a Confucius Classroom grant from the Confucius Institute, providing funds for community members to learn Mandarin and study the Chinese culture free of charge. St. Mary's was the first school in the United States to become part of the Confucius Institute.

St. Mary’s has a diverse range of students from different cultures, including international students from China, Korea, Taiwan, Vietnam, Belgium, England, and Indonesia.

== Athletics ==
St. Mary's is a member of the Oregon School Activities Association and participates in the Far West League. All teams currently play in Class 3A based on school enrollment. The school has won numerous state championships in various sports in Class B, 1A, 2A and 3A since 1958.

== Notable alumni ==
- Dylan Wu, class of 2014, is a professional golfer who made his PGA debut at the U.S. Open on June 17, 2021. There, Wu finished the tournament in a tie for 31st place, to start his professional golfing career.
- Brian Adesman, class of 2008, is a litigator, trial lawyer, and legal correspondent in Los Angeles, California, known for taking big cases to trial against powerful people and institutions. Brian Adesman is the founder and principal of the law firm Miller Adesman, PLC and has been dubbed a "powerhouse" attorney by major media outlets.
