= Travis Credit Union Park =

Former baseball stadium in California, U.S.

- Interactive map of Travis Credit Union Park
- Former names: Nut Tree Stadium (2000), La Mesa RV Stadium (2000)
- Location: 50 Nut Tree Road; Vacaville, California 95688
- Coordinates: 38.3677°N 121.9573°W
- Capacity: 2,800 (2001-2008), 3,500 (2000)
- Surface: Natural grass
- Field size: Left Field: 330 ft (100 m); Center Field: 405 ft (123 m); Right Field: 330 ft (101 m)

Construction
- Groundbreaking: November 1999
- Opened: May 26, 2000
- Renovated: bleachers converted to bucket seats (2001), new concessions facility and picnic area (2002)
- Closed: 2008 (stadium dismantled and moved to Redding, California)
- Cost: $4.5 million (2000)

Tenants
- Solano Steelheads (Western Baseball League) (2000-2002); Solano Thunderbirds (Sierra Baseball League) (2003-2007)

Travis Credit Union Park, also known as Nut Tree Stadium, was a stadium in Vacaville, California. It was primarily used for baseball and was the home field of the Solano Steelheads of the Western Baseball League and later the Solano Thunderbirds. The ballpark had a capacity of 2,800 people.

In 2008, a deal was reached to tear down the ballpark and move it to Redding, California. Bleachers and bucket seats from Vacaville were added to Redding's Tiger Field during the 2014 renovation that brought the ballpark's capacity to 1,200 seats.
