= Healdsburg Prune Packers =

Collegiate summer baseball team

- Logo

Information
- League: Pacific Empire League (2024-present)
- Location: Healdsburg, California
- Ballpark: Recreation Park
- Founded: 1921
- Nickname: Packers
- League championships: 6 (Redwood Empire League: 1931, 1952) (California Collegiate League: 2021, 2022, 2023) (Pacific Empire League: 2024, 2025)
- Division championships: 6
- Former league(s): Independent (1921); Sonoma County League (1930); Redwood Empire League (1931); Redwood Empire Baseball League (1951-1962); Sacramento Rural League (2012-2013); California Collegiate League (2014–2023)
- Colors: Burgundy, Black, White
- Ownership: Natalie Norman, Esq. (CEO), Richard Bugarske (President)
- General manager: Joey Gomes
- Website: www.prunepackers.org

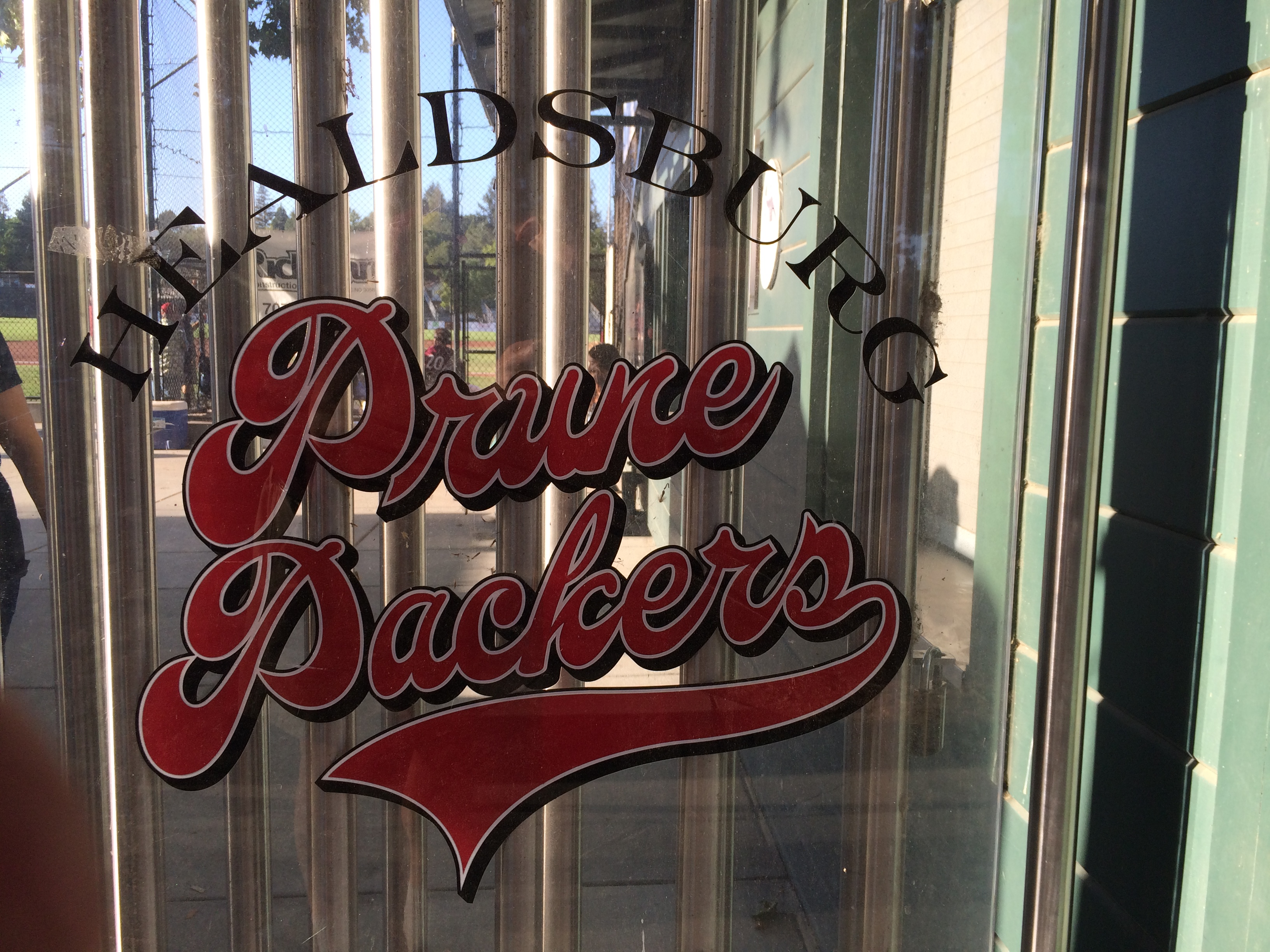
Prune Packers logo at Recreation Park, Healdsburg, California

The Healdsburg Prune Packers are the collegiate level summer baseball team which has been playing at Recreation Park since 1921. Operating under various organizational structures over the years, the Packers became a part of the California Collegiate League in 2014. As of 2024, they became a charter team of the newly-formed Pacific Empire League.

== History ==
=== Founding years ===
In February 1921, under the leadership of the Healdsburg Chamber of Commerce, a new baseball team was organized. The first game was played on 15 May 1921 with Red Corrick pitching. The first year included 21 Sunday games against the Nucoa Butters, the Petaluma Leghorns, the Santa Rosa Rosebuds, the San Francisco Ninantic Parlor, the Vallejo Y.M.I., Oakland Maxwell Hardware, San Francisco M.J. B. Coffee Kids and the San Francisco Associated Terminals.

In the first five years, the Prune Packers earned an enviable record: 1921 14 W, 9 L; 1922 20 W, 6 L; 1923 22 W, 4 L; 1924 20 W, 6 L; 1925 7 W, 2L. In July 1925, the team was suddenly disbanded by the Healdsburg Chamber of Commerce and the baseball committee when the finances of the team proved untenable. At the time of the disbanding, the Santa Rosa and Petaluma teams had already folded and the St. Helena and Napa teams were expected to disband shortly.

=== 1930s ===
In 1930, the Prune Packers represented Healdsburg in the Sonoma County League.

While the 1931 season was threatened with cancellation because of lack of local support, the Prune Packers won the championship in the Redwood Empire League.

In 1932, the Prune Packers attempted to operate as a non-league-affiliated team to play various local teams. Only one game appears to have been played, against Lakeport, which the Packers lost.

A full 1933 season of 20 games was played, but the final game was canceled because of the approaching starts of colleges and high schools. The Prune Packers won 12 games and lost 8.

In 1938, the I.O.O.F. sponsored Healdsburg baseball using the organization's three links as a logo and without using the Prune Packers name.

While baseball continued in Healdsburg under the auspices of the Odd Fellows during the 1940s, the Prune Packers were not active.

In 1949, lights were added to Recreation Park.

=== 1951–1962 ===
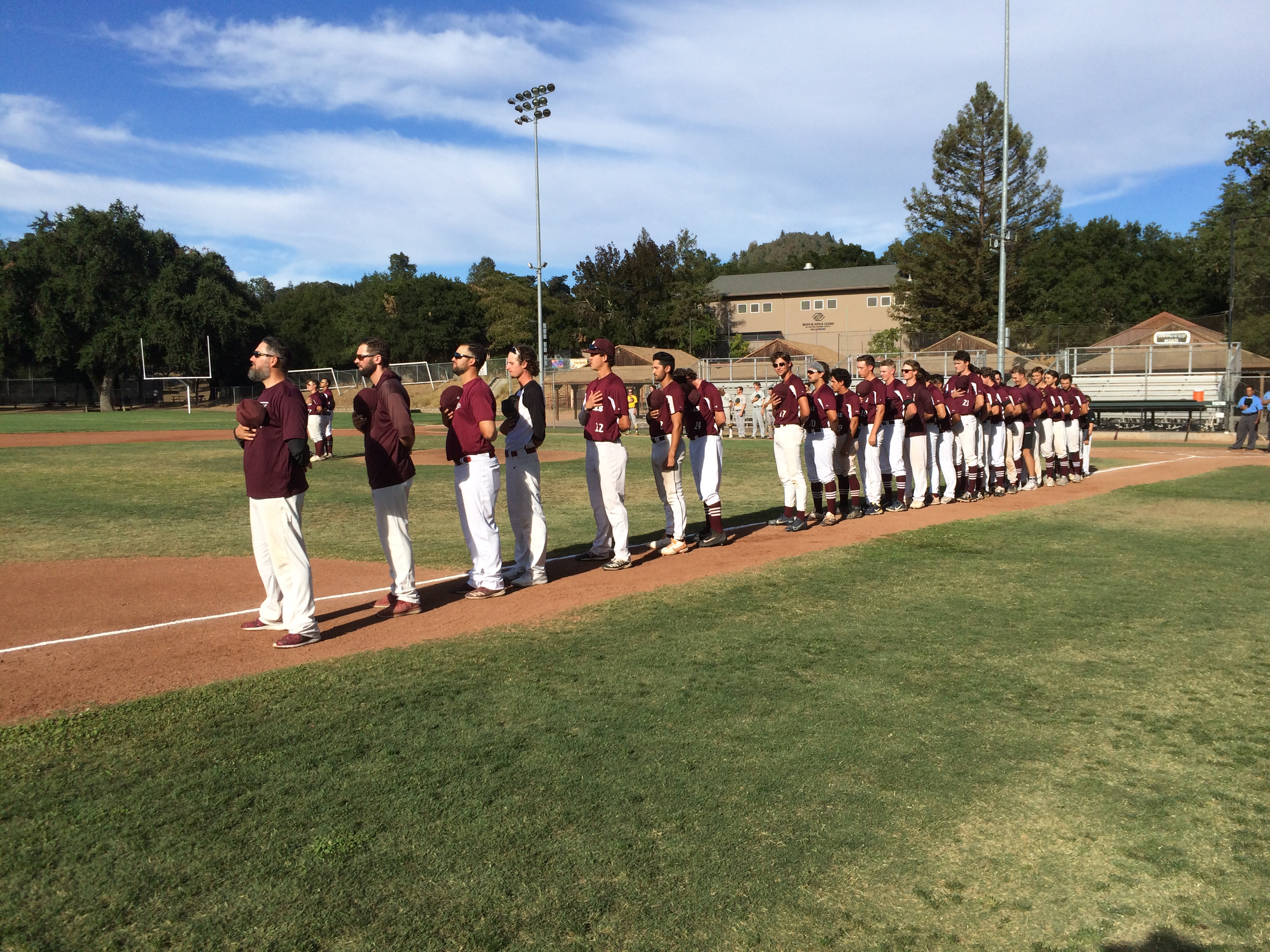
Healdsburg Prune Packers lined up for the National Anthem on 2 August 2021

In 1951, the Odd Fellows withdrew from supporting local baseball and the Healdsburg Lighting Committee took over local adult baseball and resurrected the team with a two night per week (Friday and Saturday) schedule. All local citizens were welcome to try out for the team.

The Prune Packers maintained an active schedule through the 1950s including winning the Redwood Empire Baseball League championship in 1952. In 1955, a high point was achieved when the Prune Packers beat the Seals.

The Prune Packers suffered during the 1962 season with attempts at reorganizing the league and a final 1961–1962 record of 6–8.

=== 2011–present ===
Community volunteers and local fundraising enabled the Recreation Park grandstands to be restored in 2011. This was the first major restoration since the grandstands were brought from the Cotati Speedway in 1923.

After a 50-year lapse, in 2012, the Prune Packers returned to play 48 games including 16 games in the Sacramento Rural League.

In 2013, the Prune Packers had a 31 W, 25 L record in the Sacramento Rural League.

For 2014, president Riley Sullivan hired former pro Joey Gomes as the manager/general manager. Joey's younger brother, Jonny Gomes, was also a baseball star. The team incorporated as a California Not-For-Profit Corporation and moved to the Golden State Collegiate Baseball League, now the California Collegiate League.

The 2015 season reported a 37–17 record in the collegiate league.

In 2016, the record was 37–14. Three pitchers each contributed four wins: Andrew Vaughan (4-0), Steven Wilson (4-1) and Justin Mullins (4-2). Jake Scheiner (1B-3B) led the team with a batting average of .376.

The Prune Packers reported a 36–15 record for 2017. Pitcher Chase Gardner lead the Packers with a 5–0 record.

During 2018, the record was 36–10. Ryan Shreve led the Prune Packers pitching with a 4–0 record.

The record was 33–7 in 2019. Elijah Birdsong led Prune Packers pitching with a 5–0 record.

The team did not play during the 2020 COVID-19 year.

The Prune Packers celebrated its 100th anniversary in 2021 with a 45–7 season and by winning the CCL State Championship. Manager Joey Gomes was awarded CCL Coach of the Year honors. Pitcher Marvcus Guarin earned a league leading 7–0 record in support of the Prune Packer's season, while finishing with a 1.55 ERA and 41 strikeouts in 29.0 innings pitched, en route to a CCL All-League selection along with six other Prune Packers.

The team recorded a 38 win and 10 loss season for 2022 and won the CCL Championship in its final game at San Luis Obispo. The playoff roster included several returning players from the 2021 championship team, including Joey Kramer (2022 CCL Tournament MVP) and Guarin. The summer roster featured Elijah Birdsong and Brandon Paulson, regarded as Major League prospects.

In 2023, the Healdsburg Prune Packers appointed Natalie Norman as Director of Development. Under her leadership, the team saw significant increases in attendance and received numerous marketing industry awards. Her initiatives also included impactful field safety upgrades at Recreation Park, enhancing the venue's safety for both players and spectators. Additionally, Norman expanded the team's network of local nonprofits, thereby enhancing community engagement. In 2024, Norman was promoted to CEO of the Prune Packers. Under her guidance, the organization has continued to achieve historic levels of attendance and make a positive impact on the local community. In the same year, she successfully brokered a historic partnership with New Era®, establishing New Era® as the official on-field cap of the Healdsburg Prune Packers. Norman has also served as President of the Pacific Empire League since 2023.

After winning their third consecutive championship in the California Collegiate League in 2023, the Healdsburg Prune Packers left the CCL and were instrumental in forming the new Pacific Empire League for the 2024 season. Their first season in the new league culminated in winning the 2024 state title, marking the Packers' fourth consecutive state title win. They were joined in the Pacific Empire League by other teams including the Humboldt Crabs, Lincoln Potters, Medford Rogues, Solano Mudcats, and West Coast Kings.

== Notable alumni ==
- Jason Alexander- pitched for Prune Packers in 2017
- Anthony Bender - pitched for the Prune Packers in 2014-16.
- Steven Wilson - pitched for the Prune Packers in 2015-16.
- Joe Ryan - pitched for Prune Packers in 2014.
- Andrew Vaughn - pitched for the Prune Packers in 2016. - Joined the Chicago White Sox.
- Jake Scheiner - hit .376 for the Prune Packers in 2016. - Joined the Seattle Mariners.
- Cooper Casad - had a 3-4 record pitching for the Prune Packers in 2017. - Signed with the San Francisco Giants.
- Billy Wilson - hit .291 for the Prune Packers in 2016. - He signed with the Cleveland Indians.
- Cal Conley - drafted by Atlanta Braves in 2021 - Hit .376 for the Prune Packers in 2019.
- Ian Villers - drafted by San Francisco Giants in 2021 - Recorded 4 wins and 0 losses for the Prune Packers in 2019.
- Quentin Selma - drafted by the Los Angeles Angels in 2021. - Hit .306 for the Prune Packers in 2018.
- Brandon Poulson - signed with the Minnesota Twins in 2014.
- Lee Walker - signed with the Boston Red Sox.

== Collegiate season-by-season results ==
Healdsburg Prune Packers
Season	League	Division	Overall	Win %	Conference	Win %	Finish	Manager	Playoffs
2012	Sacramento Rural League	–	–	–	None				
2013	Sacramento Rural League	–	31–25	.554	None				
2014	GSCBL	–	36–19	.655	22–13	.629	3rd	Joey Gomes	
2015	Independent	–	37–13	.740	None			Joey Gomes	
2016	CCL	North	38–16	.704	14–12	.538	2nd	Joey Gomes	
2017	CCL	North	35–15	.700	26–9	.743	1st	Joey Gomes	Won Quarterfinal game (Conejo) 1–0; Lost Semifinal game (Orange County) 0–1; Won Semifinal elimination game (Conejo) 1–0; Won Championship elimination game (Orange County) 1–0; Lost Championship elimination game (Orange County) 0–1
2018	CCL	–	35–10	.778	14–10	.583	3rd	Joey Gomes	Lost Semifinal (Conejo)
2019	CCL	Affiliate	38–8	.826	19–5	.432	1st	Joey Gomes	Lost Championship (Santa Barbara)
2020	Independent	–	6–2–1	.722	Not held due to (COVID-19 pandemic)			Joey Gomes	
2021	CCL	North	45–7	.865	29–5	.853	1st	Joey Gomes	Lost Quarterfinal game (San Luis Obispo) 0–1; Won elimination game (Conejo) 1–0; Won Semifinal (Arroyo Seco) 1–0; Won Championship (San Luis Obispo) 1–0
2022	CCL	North	37–10	.787	25–9	.735	1st	Joey Gomes	Won North Finals (San Luis Obispo) 1–0; Won Championship (Conejo) 2–0
2023	CCL	North	39–9	.813	26–9	.743	1st	Joey Gomes	Won North Finals (Walnut Creek) 1–0; Won Championship (Arroyo Seco) 2–1
2024	PEL	–	37–6	.860	22–5	.815	1st	Joey Gomes	Won Championship (Lincoln) 2–1
2025	PEL	–	38–6	.864	24–6	.800	1st	Joey Gomes	Won Championship Humboldt Crabs 2–1
Totals			383–115–1	.769	197–77	.719	—	—	—
