= California Collegiate League =

Collegiate summer baseball league

The California Collegiate League
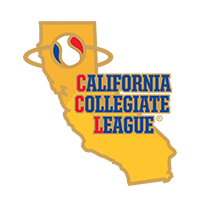
- Association: National Alliance of Collegiate Summer Baseball (NACSB) nacsb.org
- Classification: Collegiate Summer Baseball
- Sport: Baseball
- Founded: 1993
- Founder: William H. Pintard
- President: Aaron B. Milam
- Commissioner: Dr. Michael J. Simpson
- No. of teams: 12
- Country: United States
- Most recent champion: Walnut Creek Crawdads (2026)
- Most titles: Santa Barbara Foresters (21)
- Website: calsummerball.com

The California Collegiate League (CCL), founded in 1993, is a collegiate summer baseball league headquartered in Moorpark, California, United States. It is associated with both the National Baseball Congress and National Alliance of College Summer Baseball.

The CCL hosts a 40-game summer season including a north-vs.-south All-Star Game, televised nationally by Bally's Sports West. Players use wooden bats and professional-level baseballs to further their development as potential professional ballplayers.

== History ==
The League was formed in 1993 and seen many changes through the years. The only two original members who still exist are the Santa Barbara Foresters and San Luis Obispo Blues. The league is considered one of top 10 collegiate summer leagues in the country. The league is known for the location of its teams and for holding a nationally televised all star game every July.

Four new teams from Northern California joined the CCL in 2014 (Menlo Park Legends, Neptune Beach Pearl, Pacific Union Capitalists and Walnut Creek Crawdads). Since 2014, the CCL has undergone significant growth and expansion, now chartering teams from Placerville to Orange County. Teams added to the league since the conclusion of 2013 postseason include, the Walnut Creek Crawdads, the Neptune Beach Pearl, the Menlo Park Legends (who have since left the league), and the Orange County Riptide.

In 2015, the Texas Rangers, selected Dillon Tate with the fourth overall pick in the 2015 MLB draft, marking the highest a CCL alumnus has been drafted.

In 2017, the California Collegiate League expanded to include the Rockville Rock Hounds, the Auburn Wildcats, the Long Beach Legends, and the Arroyo Seco Saints. This will bring the total number of teams from 10 to 14.

In 2020, the California Collegiate League implemented major changes to its structure, introducing a three-division format: North, Central, and South. The new Northern Division comprised four teams—the Healdsburg Prune Packers, Lincoln Potters, and Solano Mudcats, who transitioned from the former Affiliate Division to become full members of the league, and the Walnut Creek Crawdads, who joined as the fourth team. The Central Division included the San Luis Obispo Blues, Santa Barbara Foresters, and Conejo Oaks. The Southern Division consisted of the Arroyo Seco Saints, Academy Barons, and Orange County Riptide.

On October 16, 2021, it was announced that the Sonoma Stompers would be joining the CCL from the Pacific Association.

== Current teams ==
Team	Founded	Joined	City	Stadium	Capacity
North Division
Menlo Park Legends	2011	2024	Palo Alto, California	Baylands Park	
Modesto Roadsters	2026	2027	Modesto, California	Modern Woodmen Field	4,000
San Francisco Seagulls	2003	2024	San Bruno, California	Tom Lara Field	600
San Luis Obispo Blues	1946	1993	San Luis Obispo, California	Sinsheimer Stadium	2,000
Sonoma Stompers	2014	2021	Sonoma, California	Arnold Field	1,500
Walnut Creek Crawdads	2006	2020	Danville, California	Monte Vista High School	
Yuba-Sutter Freebirds	2024	2027	Marysville, California	Bryant Field	4,000
South Division
MLB Academy Barons	2007	2007	Compton, California	MLB Youth Academy	
Arroyo Seco Saints	2004	2017	Pasadena, California	Jackie Robinson Memorial Field	4,200
Conejo Oaks	2006	2006	Ventura, California	Pirate Park	
Orange County Riptide	2015	2016	Irvine, California	Championship Baseball Stadium	1,250
Santa Barbara Foresters	1991	1993	Santa Barbara, California	Santa Barbara High School	
Affiliates
Alameda Merchants	2012	2024	Alameda, California	Pat Bail Field	
San Diego Bombers	2023	2025	San Diego, California	Traveling team	
San Diego Waves	1995	2025	San Diego, California	Traveling team	
Philippines Baseball Group	2021	2025	Los Angeles, California	Traveling team	

== Former teams ==
- Healdsburg Prune Packers
- Solano Mudcats
- Lincoln Potters
- Ventura Halos
- Long Beach Legends
- Southern California Catch
- Rockville Rockhounds
- Neptune Beach Pearl
- Bakersfield Sound
- Glendale Angelenos
- Los Angeles Brewers
- Monterey Bay Sox
- Menlo Park Legends
- Novato Knicks
- PUF Capitalists
- Team Vegas
- Santa Maria Indians

== Champions ==
Season	Winner	Runner-up	Result
1993	Santa Barbara Foresters		
1994	Santa Barbara Foresters		
1995	Santa Barbara Foresters		
1996	Santa Barbara Foresters		
1997	Santa Barbara Foresters		
1998	Santa Barbara Foresters		
1999	Santa Barbara Foresters		
2000	Santa Barbara Foresters		
2001	Santa Barbara Foresters		
2002	Santa Barbara Foresters		
2003	Santa Barbara Foresters		
2004	Santa Barbara Foresters		
2005	Santa Barbara Foresters		
2006	Santa Barbara Foresters		
2007	Santa Barbara Foresters		
2008	Santa Barbara Foresters		
2009	Unknown		
2010	Santa Barbara Foresters		
2011	Santa Barbara Foresters		
2012	Santa Barbara Foresters		
2013	Los Angeles Brewers	Santa Barbara Foresters	
2014	Los Angeles Brewers	Neptune Beach Pearl	
2015	Neptune Beach Pearl	Los Angeles Brewers	
2016	Santa Barbara Foresters	Conejo Oaks	
2017	Orange County Riptide	Healdsburg Prune Packers	
2018	Conejo Oaks	Orange County Riptide	
2019	Santa Barbara Foresters	Healdsburg Prune Packers	
2021	Healdsburg Prune Packers	San Luis Obispo Blues	
2022	Healdsburg Prune Packers	Conejo Oaks	2-0 series
2023	Healdsburg Prune Packers	Arroyo Seco Saints	2-1 series
2024	Conejo Oaks	Walnut Creek Crawdads	2-0 series
2025	Conejo Oaks	Sonoma Stompers	2-0 series
2026	Walnut Creek Crawdads	Academy Barons	2-1 series

== Notable alumni of current teams ==
While all teams in the California Collegiate League have combined for over 100 years of history, not all teams have played in the CCL throughout their history. The notable alumni of the current teams who have played in the CCL or in their respective teams' previous leagues include:

=== Academy Barons ===
- Khris Davis
- Dillon Tate

=== Arroyo Seco Saints ===
- John Holdzkom
- Christian Bergman

=== Conejo Oaks ===
- Ryon Healy
- Tyler Heineman

=== Orange County Riptide ===
- Dominic Fletcher
- Caleb Kilian
- Trey Lipscomb
- Eric Wagaman
- Hunter Bigge

=== San Luis Obispo Blues ===
- Kyle Hendricks
- Brooks Lee
- C.J. Cron
- Matt Garza
- Ross Stripling
- Brian Fuentes
- Doug Bernier
- Casey Candaele
- Chuck Estrada
- Casey Fien
- Marcus Gwyn
- Roy Howell
- Jim Lonborg
- Adam Moore
- Brent Morel
- Will Ohman
- Mel Queen

=== Santa Barbara Foresters ===
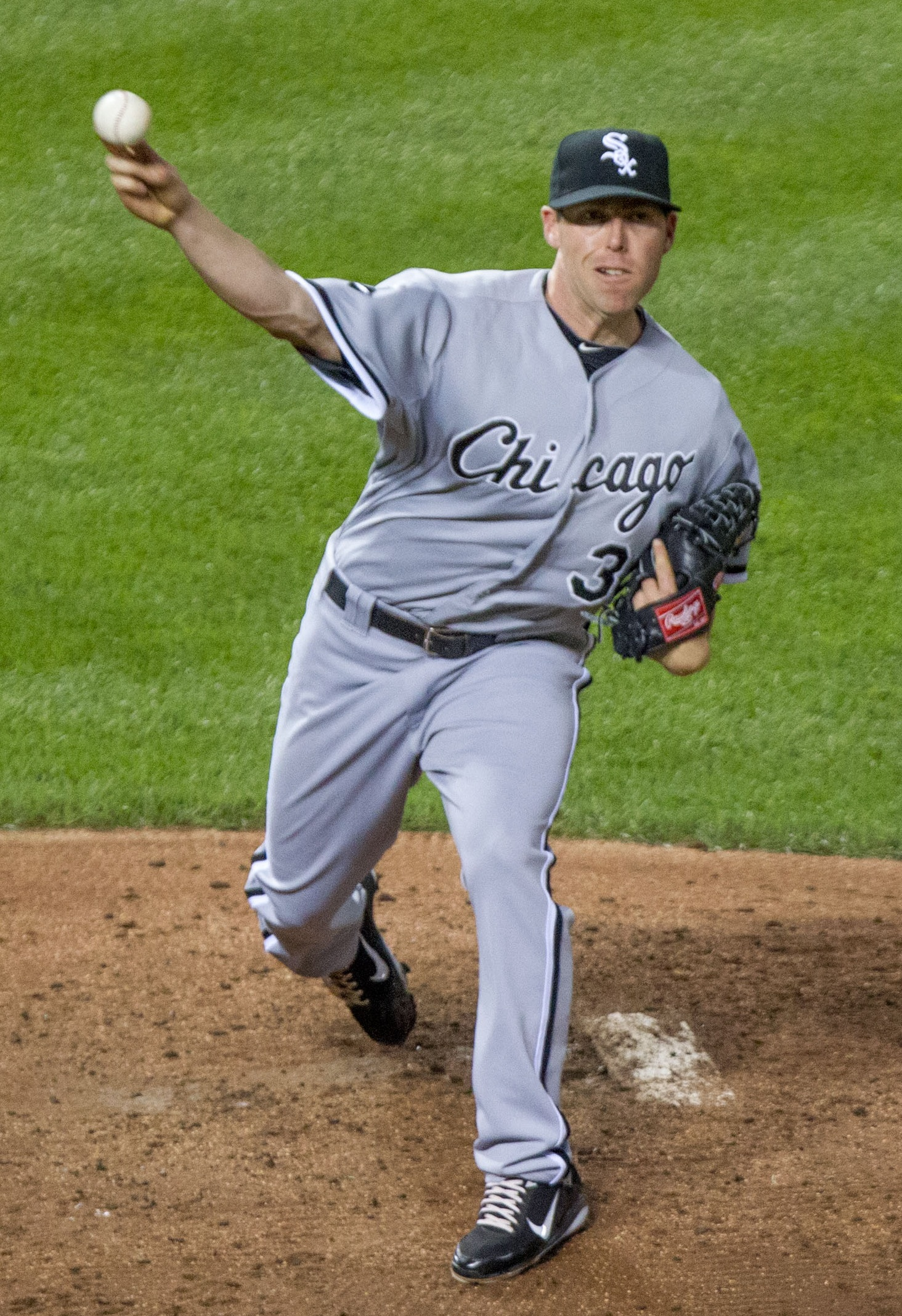
Dylan Axelrod

- James Shields
- Garrett Crochet
- Ryan Helsley
- Kyle Isbel
- Jeff McNeil
- Ryan O'Hearn
- Aaron Bummer
- Christian Encarnacion-Strand
- Matt McLain
- Tanner Bibee
- Spencer Steer
- Josh Jung
- James McCann
- Ryan Spilborghs
- Dylan Axelrod
- Delwyn Young
- Morgan Ensberg
- Kevin Frandsen
- Ryan Church
- Cameron Rupp
- Sean Tracey
- Virgil Vasquez
- Tyler Walker
- Jon Duplantier
- Drew Maggi

== Notable alumni of past teams ==
- Dylan Moore
- Daniel Susac
- Cal Stevenson
- Lucas Erceg
- Andrew Vaughn
- Joe Ryan
- Anthony Bender
- Jake Scheiner
