= Medford Rogues (collegiate wood bat baseball) =

Collegiate summer baseball team

- Logo

Information
- League: Far Western Conference (2027-present)
- Location: Medford, Oregon
- Ballpark: Harry & David Field
- Founded: 2012
- League championships: 1 (2017)
- Division championships: 0
- Former name: None
- Former leagues: West Coast League (2012–2015); Great West League (2016–2018); Golden State Collegiate Baseball League (2019–2021); Independent (2022–2023); Pacific Empire League (2024–2026)
- Colors: Green, Gray, Red and White
- Mascot: Rowdy!
- Ownership: Dave & Tabitha May
- General manager: Jeff Weiss
- Manager: Matt Tomlin (head coach)
- Media: KDRV (television); Rogue Valley Times (newspaper)
- Website: www.medfordrogues.com

The Medford Rogues are a collegiate wood bat baseball team based in Medford, Oregon. They are members of the newly-formed Pacific Empire League starting in 2024.

They played in the West Coast League from 2013 to 2015, and were founding members of the Great West League, where they played from 2016 to 2018, then were members of the Golden State Collegiate Baseball League from 2019 to 2021. They play their home games at Harry & David Field and were named after the former Class-D Far West League affiliate of the New York Giants that played from 1950 to 1951. They were the 2017 GWL Champions.

== History ==
Original logo (2012-2025)

=== 2013 West Coast League ===
The Rogues were founded in 2012 by Consolidated Sports Holdings International, Inc, based in Scottsdale, Arizona. The chief investor was Bill Yuill, chairman and C.E.O. of The Monarch Corporation of Medicine Hat, Alberta. The president was Gary Gelinas. The first general manager was Chuck Heeman, former G.M. of fellow West Coast League franchise the Klamath Falls Gems. The Rogues replaced the now-defunct Southern Oregon Riverdawgs, who played at Harry & David Field previously.

=== 2014 West Coast League ===
The Medford Rogues went 26–28 in their 2nd season of WCL play. They missed the play-offs by 5 games behind the wild card leader. Yuto Kata played as a support batter by sacrifice bunting 19 times and setting the WCL record for the most sacrifice bunts by any one batter in one season. Also, Spencer Smith got hit by pitch 18 times setting the record for the most times hit by the pitch by any batter. The Rogues put 41,490 people in the seats in 32 home openings with 1,297 a night.

=== 2015: New League ===
The Rogues welcomed Ian Church as their new general manager for the 2015 WCL season, replacing Chuck Heeman. On September 23, 2015, the Rogues announced that they would be joining the Great West League, a new collegiate summer league with teams from Oregon and California. They became the sixth team to join the league along with the Chico Heat, Lodi Crushers, Marysville Gold Sox, Portland Pickles and the new Sacramento Stealth.

=== 2016 Great West League ===
The Rogues named Carolyn Birch as interim general manager in the spring of 2016. They opened play in the Great West League on June 3, 2016, with a victory over the Portland Pickles. It was also announced that the Rogues will be the inaugural hosts of the annual GWL All-Star Game scheduled for July 25 and 26.

=== 2017 Great West League Champions ===
The Rogues finished the regular season at 40–20, their best record in history. But Carolyn Birch stepped down as general manager in the final game of the regular season against Chico on August 5, 2017. Also, Jonathan Kurman took over as play-by-play commentator near season's end after Brian Schnee (who started the season with the Rogues) became news/sports anchor at KTVL News 10. The Rogues took their semi-final series with the Portland Pickles 2 games to one and faced off against their chief rivals the Chico Heat in a rematch of last year's GWL Championship Series. They swept the Heat 5–3 in Game 1 in Chico and 7–2 in Game 2 in Medford to capture their first championship in franchise history dating back to their inaugural season in the WCL in 2013.

Following the season, head coach Josh Hogan stepped down. He was replaced by former Oregon State Beavers and Arizona Diamondbacks standout Tyler Graham. In addition, Dave May, was named the team's new Chief Operating Officer.

=== 2018: New League ===
On October 4, 2018, the Rogues ownership, CSH International, announced that the Rogues are exploring other options with regards to their future as the Great West League ceased operations the same day. On December 12, they announced that they were sold by CSH to local businessman Treg Scott effective December 31 and are joining the Golden State Collegiate Baseball League.

=== 2019 GSCBL ===
On January 14, 2019, the Rogues announced the hiring of former St. Mary's High School baseball coach Sean Gallagher as their new head coach. On February 19, 2019, the Rogues announce general manager and COO Dave May had purchased an ownership stake in the team.

=== 2020 GSCBL ===
The Rogues hired former Oregon State Beavers standout Bill Rowe. The GSCBL season for 2020 was cancelled due the COVID-19 pandemic. However, the Rogues played an abbreviated season with lesser known teams.

=== 2021 GSCBL ===
The Rogues had the opportunity to finally have a full GSCBL season along with a few non-league opponents.

=== 2022 Independent ===
Owners Dave and Tabitha May took full control of the Rogues and play as an independent team and will play an independent schedule featuring teams from many different leagues.

=== 2023 Independent ===
The Rogues announced on their Facebook page that head coach Bill Rowe was stepping down and associate head coach Parker Berberet would take the reins of the team. On December 13, 2023, the Rogues announced as the new head coach former Oregon State staff member Nate Esposito.

=== 2024: New League ===
December 15, 2024 the Rogues were announced as inaugural members of the new Pacific Empire League along with the Healdsburg Prune Packers, Humboldt Crabs, Lincoln Potters, Solano Mudcats and West Coast Kings.

== Front Office Staff ==
- Dave May – Co-Owner/President
- Tabitha May – Co-Owner
- Jeff Weiss – General Manager
- B.G. Gould – Scorekeeper and Stats
- Gregory Roberts – Public Address Announcer
- Tracy McCormack – Director of Communications

=== Broadcast Team ===
- Bryan Welch – Play by Play Announcer, Youtube Sports Broadcaster

=== Baseball Team ===
- Matt Tomlin – Head Coach
- Rob Patterson – Team Physician
