= Sacramento Smokeys =

Information
- League: Independent (Northern California)
- Location: Sacramento, California
- Ballpark: Harry Renfree Field
- Founded: 1949
- Former name: Sacramento County Smokey’s
- Former league(s): Western Baseball Association (1983-2000s); Mexican-American Baseball League
- Colors: Black, White, and Gold
- Ownership: Larry Manuian
- Website: Official Site

The Sacramento Smokeys were a semi-pro and collegiate summer baseball team located in Sacramento, California, founded in 1949 by Larry Manuian, who ran the team until his death in 2011. The Smokeys played in multiple leagues in Northern California usually consisting of their prominent rivals such as the Fontanetti's Athletics and the Humboldt Crabs.

In the 1990s, many Smokeys games were broadcast on local television. The Smokeys were Sacramento’s top baseball team with prominent coverage in the Sacramento Bee, from when the Sacramento Solons moved after the 1976 season until the arrival of the Pacific Coast League’s Sacramento River Cats in 1999. The Smokeys roster usually consisted of former professional players and current college players from Sacramento City College, UC Davis and Sacramento State.

== Timothy Busfield ==
A year after Thirtysomething ended its fourth and final season on ABC, actor Timothy Busfield made national news when he signed as a pitcher with the Smokeys in the summer of 1992. After the signing, the Smokeys received national news coverage from People Magazine, Late Show with David Letterman, CBS This Morning, Entertainment Tonight, Good Morning America, and USA Today. Over nine seasons pitching for the Smokeys, in between acting jobs, Busfield amassed a pitching record of 30 wins and 12 losses. In 1993, Busfield went with the Smokeys on a road trip to the Arcata Ball Park to pitch against the Humboldt Crabs, pitching 7 innings and sustaining a 4–3 loss to future major league pitcher Mike Thurman.

== Notable alumni ==
- Steve Brown (1977, 1989-2000s)
- Butch Metzger (1979-1996)
- Butch Edge (1985)
- F. P. Santangelo (1987)
- Steve Senteney (1988)
- Fernando Viña (1988)
- Timothy Busfield (1992-2000)
- Joe Thurston (1998)
