= Tim Wheeler (baseball) =

American baseball player (born 1988)

- Outfielder
- Born: January 21, 1988 (age 38); Sacramento, California, U.S.
- Bats: Right Throws: Right
- Stats at Baseball Reference

Timothy Scott Wheeler (born January 21, 1988) is an American former professional baseball outfielder. He was drafted by the Colorado Rockies in the first round, 32nd overall, of the 2009 Major League Baseball draft. He played college baseball at Sacramento State. In 2011 he was the Texas League home run champion.

== Amateur career ==
Wheeler attended El Camino Fundamental High School in Sacramento, California. He was a two-sport athlete, playing in the outfield for the baseball team and playing quarterback and defensive back in football.

Wheeler played college baseball at Sacramento State University. In 2008, he played collegiate summer baseball with the Orleans Cardinals of the Cape Cod Baseball League and was named a league all-star. In 2009, he was named a second team All-American by Baseball America after hitting .385 with 18 home runs and 72 runs batted in.

== Professional career ==
Wheeler was drafted by the Colorado Rockies in the first round, 32nd overall, of the 2009 Major League Baseball draft. He made his professional debut with the Tri-City Dust Devils, playing in 68 games and hitting .256 with 5 home runs and 35 RBI.

Prior to the 2010 season, he was ranked as the Rockies' seventh-best prospect by Baseball America. Wheeler spent the 2010 season with the High-A Modesto Nuts, playing in 129 games and hitting .249/.341/.384 with 12 home runs, 63 RBI, and 22 stolen bases.

He played in 138 games with the Double-A Tulsa Drillers in 2011, batting .287/.365/.535 with career-highs in home runs (33; leading the Texas League), runs (105; leading the league), and RBI (86; 6th), and 21 stolen bases (8th). His 33 home runs were a Tulsa professional baseball modern era (from 1932) single-season home run record, that was not passed until Jake Gelof passed it in 2026.

Prior to the 2012 season, Baseball America rated him the Rockies' fifth-best prospect. However, he suffered a fracture of the hamate bone in his right hand only a few days into the season. He missed significant time that season, finishing with a .303 batting average and 2 home runs in 92 games for the Triple-A Colorado Springs Sky Sox.

On November 20, 2012, the Rockies added Wheeler to their 40-man roster to protect him from the Rule 5 draft. He played in 109 games with Colorado Springs in 2013, hitting .262/.330/.355 with 5 home runs, 42 RBI, and 12 stolen bases. On November 27, 2013, Wheeler was removed from the 40-man roster and sent outright to Triple-A.

Wheeler spent a third straight season with Colorado Springs in 2014, making 119 appearances and slashing .233/.313/.387 with 11 home runs, 45 RBI, and 9 stolen bases. In 2015, Wheeler played in 124 games for the Triple-A Albuquerque Isotopes, batting .245/.345/.367 with 10 home runs, 45 RBI, and 16 stolen bases. He elected free agency following the season on November 6, 2015.

== Coaching career ==
On May 21, 2016, Wheeler joined the Humboldt Crabs as the team’s hitting coach, working alongside manager Tyson Fisher and pitching coach Eric Giacone.

From 2017 to 2019, Wheeler was the outfield and hitting coach at Sacramento State, his alma mater, serving under head coach Reggie Christiansen.
