= Humboldt Crabs =

Collegiate summer baseball team

- Logo

Information
- League: Pacific Empire League (2024–present)
- Location: Arcata, California
- Ballpark: Arcata Ball Park
- Founded: 1945
- Nickname: Crusty The Mascot
- California State Semi-Pro championships: 1961, 1963–1977, 1979, 1981
- League championships: Far West League (2011–2013), WCL Tri-State (2010), Horizon Air Summer Series (2007, 2013), West of the Rockies (1982-1985), Western Baseball Association (1967–1969, 1982–1996)
- Former name: Paladini Crabs (1945–1948)
- Former league(s): Far West League (2011–2013); WCL Tri-State (2009–2010); Horizon Air Summer Series (2006–2009, 2012–2013); Big West Conference (1970–1972); Western Baseball Association (1967–1969, 1982–1996)
- Former ballpark(s): Albee Stadium (1945–1967); Babe Ruth Field at Redwood Acres (1973–1980); Ferndale Fairgrounds Field (1976)
- Colors: Blue, Red and White
- Mascot: Dungeness Crab
- Ownership: Community Organization
- Management: Board of Directors
- Manager: Jeff Giacomini

The Humboldt Crabs are a collegiate summer baseball team located in Arcata, California. Playing in every season since they were founded in 1945 by Lou Bonomini, later joined by Ned Barsuglia, the Crabs are the oldest continually-operated summer collegiate baseball team in American baseball. Through the 2026 season the Crabs have a total record of 2774 wins, 855 losses, and one tie. The Crabs did not play the 2020 season due to the COVID-19 pandemic. The Crabs are a charter member of the Pacific Empire League.

Crabs games are broadcast on ESPN Radio KATA 107.3 FM/1340 AM, the Humboldt Crabs YouTube Channel. Most games also include the Crab Grass Band, formed in 1983, that play songs in between innings.

In 2026, a feature length documentary entitled Lou's Team: The Story of the Humboldt Crabs, covering the 83 year history of the team, was released.

== Brief background ==
Originally the Eureka Paladini Crabs, named for the Paladini Fish Company who sponsored the team from 1945 to 1947. Mel Bareilles, grandfather of Sara Bareilles, played on the Crabs in their inaugural season and Lloyd Bridges Sr., father of Lloyd Bridges, was a lifelong Crabs fan and financial supporter. The Crabs, who did not have their own uniforms made until 1948, originally wore uniforms from the Redwood League, Eureka Tallow Company, and Chicago Bridge & Iron, all teams that Bonomini and other original Crabs had played for in the 1930s and early 1940s.

In the 83-year history of the Humboldt Crabs, over 300 players have continued on to play professional baseball, with over 60 former Crabs going all the way to the Major Leagues. Dane Iorg played for the Crabs from 1968 to 1970. John Oldham, a Crabs pitcher in 1952–53, was the first to make it all the way, playing for the Cincinnati Reds in 1956. Leo Rosales, who pitched for the 2002 Crabs, was called up to the Arizona Diamondbacks in 2008. 2003 Crabs infielder Brett Pill was called up to the San Francisco Giants in 2011, and was on the team's 2012 roster as a 1st baseman. Most recently, Vinny Pestano, Bradley Zimmer, Mike Redmond and James Outman are all former Crabs.

Their best season, record-wise, was 1985 when the team won 46 consecutive games to start the season. Future Major Leaguers Mike Harkey, Eric Gunderson, Steve Olin, and Scott Chiamparino led a dominant pitching staff.

The Crabs play the majority of their games at home at the Arcata Ball Park, owned by the City of Arcata. The team is made up of college players from different NCAA programs throughout the U.S. The Humboldt Crabs are a non-profit baseball organization operated by a 12-member all-volunteer Board of Directors. Rivals include the Redding Colt 45s, the Fontanetti's Athletics, the Corvallis Knights, and the Seattle Studs. Most recent opponents include Healdsburg Prune Packers, San Luis Obispo Blues, Seals Baseball, Walnut Creek Crawdads, Solano Mudcats, Marysville Gold Sox and many others from the CCL League. Past opponents include House of David, the Indianapolis Clowns, the Oakland Larks, the Los Angeles White Sox, the San Diego Tigers, the Portland Roses, Owl Drug, the Alaska Goldpanners, the Redding Browns, the Bend Elks, the Bellingham Bells, the North Pole Nicks, the Valley Green Giants, the Santa Barbara Foresters, the Anchorage Glacier Pilots, the Boulder Collegians, the Sacramento Smokeys, the Grand Junction Eagles, and Athletes in Action. Through the years the Crabs have run multiple secondary teams, the Humboldt Ports (1962), the Humboldt All-Stars (1996–2006), and the Humboldt Steelheads (2007–2011).

In 2008, the Crabs drew an average of 874 fans to the ball park. In 2026, the Crabs averaged 735 fans per game.

The Humboldt Crabs are a non-profit, community-oriented organization. Its mission is four-fold:

- To promote family entertainment by providing high-quality summer collegiate baseball games to the public at a reasonable price;
- To provide talented collegiate-level baseball players with a positive summer baseball experience;
- To support youth sports programs (with an emphasis on baseball or softball) in the Humboldt County area with contributions of funding and/or equipment as funds permit in addition to annual baseball skills camps and clinics operated by Humboldt Crabs players and coaches;
- To preserve and build the tradition of Humboldt Crabs Baseball.

== Current roster ==
2026 Humboldt Crabs roster
Players		Coaches
Pitchers: 19 Nathan Bunyard; 44 Cedar Cline; 9 Cody Collins; 22 Aidan Dorsch; 6 Justin Dougan; 16 Adam Enyart; 11 Eli Fogelman; 34 Spencer Jacobs; 1 Jackson Kelly; 2 Ben Lukens; 27 Evan Miranda; 37 Antonio Nordman; 30 Jack Novak; 40 Miles Oliver; 26 Cooper Ohlsen; 28 Bryson Schelp; 12 Myles Standish	Catchers: 35 Jason Arriola; 5 Liam Forsyth; 10 Kawana Soares; 45 Ryan VandenBrink; Infielders: 7 Colton Boardman; 36 Eli Burnham; 31 Moana Chapman; 4 Joe Fagan; 39 Alex Harrington; 38 Everet Johnson; 20 Jamie Mullin; 13 Mikey Pickett; 3 Jaden Shabry; Outfielders: 17 Tyler Howard; 8 Chyran Humphries; 15 Daniel Osborne Jr.; 14 Anane Wilson; 6 Nikko Taylor	Manager: 33 Jeff Giacomini; Coaches: -- Tommy Gale (Hitting); 21 John Bryant (Assistant); -- Matt Tomlin (Pitching); 35 active; (17 pitchers, 18 position players)
Updated: July 7, 2026

== 2026 player awards ==
- Most Valuable Player: Adam Enyart
- Offensive Player of the Year: Kawana Soares
- Pitcher of the Year: Jackson Kelly
- "Coaches Award" – Kevin Morsching/Scott Heinig Memorial Award: Jason Arriola
- Defensive Player of the Year: Joe Fagan

== Organization ==
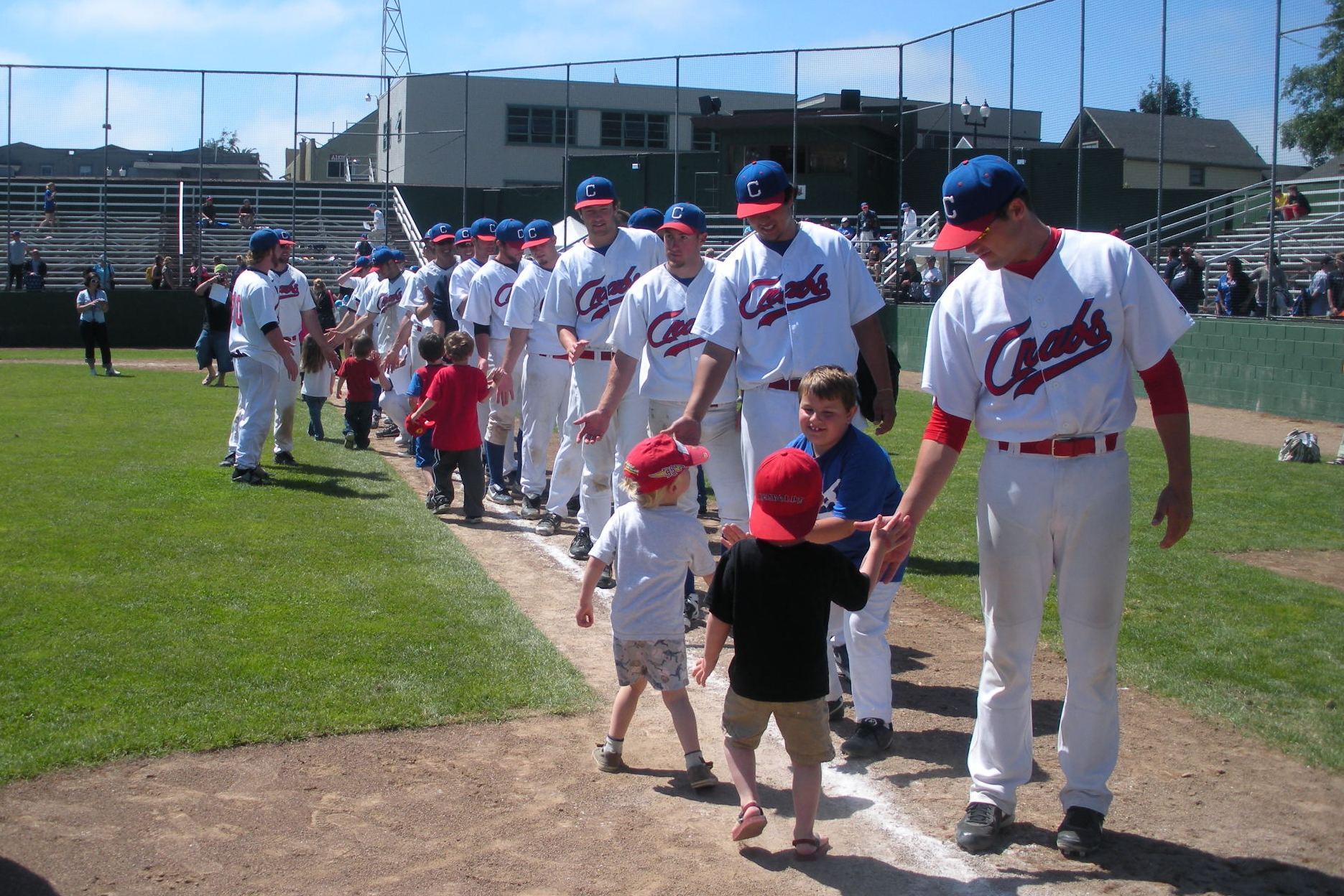
Humboldt Crabs Fan Appreciation Day 2010

Humboldt Crabs Baseball, Inc is a 501(c)(4) community-owned organization. A volunteer board of directors rely on the support of community members & sponsors to keep the Humboldt Crabs Baseball operation functioning.

=== President ===
Scarlet Palmer

=== Coaching staff ===
- Jeff Giacomini, Manager
- Tommy Gale, Hitting Coach
- John Bryant, Assistant Coach

Trainers: Nate Kees

== Far West League ==
The Crabs joined the Far West League (FWL), which had ten teams participating in the 2011 season. The five-team FWL North Division included the Humboldt Crabs, Nor Cal Pirates, Redding Colt 45s, Nevada Bullets (formerly Reno Aces), and Southern Oregon RiverDawgs. The five-team FWL South Division included the Atwater Aviators, Fontanetti's Athletics, Neptune Beach Pearl, California Glory, and Fresno Cardinals. The Crabs were part of the West Coast League/Tri-State (which was associated with the West Coast League in the Pacific Northwest) then merged with the Pacific West Baseball League to form the FWL. (The California Seals were originally an eleventh team in the FWL but are on hiatus for the 2011 season.)

=== 2011 league champions ===
This inaugural year of the Far West League culminated with the top five League teams competing in a double-elimination Tournament, hosted by the Humboldt Crabs and played in the Arcata Ball Park, August 5–7. The Humboldt Crabs (21–6), with the best record in regular season league play, were the top-seeded team, but lost their first game to fourth-seed Fontanetti's Athletics, 1–0, on August 5. To avoid being eliminated, the Crabs had to win four games in a row. On August 6, the Crabs shut out the Atwater Aviators, 2–0, in an elimination game. On August 7 the Crabs won three games in one day, starting with Fontanetti's Athletics, 7–2, (who had beaten the Crabs 2 of 3 games in regular-season play); then facing the Neptune Beach Pearl who had won 8 of their previous 9 games, and who were as yet undefeated in the Tournament. By winning four in a row, including 6–3 and 5–1 wins over the Pearl, the Crabs avoided elimination and won the tournament and the championship.

The Humboldt Crabs finished the 2011 season with records of 40–13 overall, 25–7 in League/Conference play.

The Humboldt Crabs rank #22 from among over 220 summer collegiate league teams in the nation for the week of August 9, 2011, by Perfect Game USA.

The Far West League has since disbanded, but the Crabs were league champions all three years in its inception.

== Year by year records ==
(*)denotes California State Semi-Pro Champion

(^) denotes West of the Rockies Tournament Champion

(<) denotes All-American Invitational Champion

(~) denotes season not played due to the COVID-19 pandemic

National Rankings through 1985 are for finishes at the National Baseball Congress World Series in Wichita, Kansas, 2011-13 is the Perfect Game Summer Collegiate Team Rankings, and YSN West Coast Collegiate Summer Power Rankings starting in 2025.

Season	Manager	Coach	Record	National Ranking
1945	Lou Bonomini		11–6	
1946	Lou Bonomini	Fred Papini	35–12	
1947	Lou Bonomini	Fred Papini	34–13	
1948	Lou Bonomini	Fred Papini	26–17	
1949	Lou Bonomini	Fred Papini	36–14	
1950	Lou Bonomini	Fred Papini, Nobby Paynter	35–12	
1951	Lou Bonomini	Fred Papini	36–14	
1952	Lou Bonomini	Phil Sarboe, Fred Papini	38–12	
1953	Lou Bonomini	Ed Hemingway, Fred Papini	29–11	
1954	Lou Bonomini		29–17	
1955	Lou Bonomini		22–22	
1956	Lou Bonomini		27–10	
1957	Lou Bonomini	Fred Papini	24–8	
1958	Lou Bonomini		17–11	
1959	Lou Bonomini	Eddie Oliveria	19–8	
1960	Lou Bonomini	Jack Altman	16–7	
1961	Lou Bonomini	Jack Altman	24–5*	5th
1962	Lou Bonomini	Jack Altman	15–6	
1963	Lou Bonomini	Bert Holt	27–7*	17th
1964	Lou Bonomini	Bert Holt	27–11*	4rd
1965	Lou Bonomini		25–10*	3rd
1966	Lou Bonomini		29–4*	3rd
1967	Lou Bonomini	Jack Altman	37–7*	4th
1968	Lou Bonomini	Jack Altman	43–11*	3rd
1969	Lou Bonomini	Wayne Hartman	30–11*	
1970	Lou Bonomini	Wayne Hartman	18–18*	
1971	Lou Bonomini	Tom Wheeler	21–20*	
1972	Lou Bonomini	Ron Brown	39–11*	
1973	Lou Bonomini	Bob Bonomini	29–19*	
1974	Lou Bonomini	Tom Hinkle	27–12–1*	5th
1975	Lou Bonomini	Tom Hinkle	38–7*	5th
1976	Lou Bonomini	Berdy Harr	31–11*	
1977	Lou Bonomini	Berdy Harr, Paul Weaver	35–5*	7th
1978	Lou Bonomini	Mike Simpson	40–10	
1979	Lou Bonomini	Bob Milano, John Smith	37–16*	
1980	Lou Bonomini	Ken Snyder, Bob Box	45–10	7th
1981	Lou Bonomini	Ken Snyder, Al Figone	43–10*	12th
1982	Lou Bonomini	Ken Snyder	27–17^	
1983	Lou Bonomini	Nick Fuscardo	39–7^	
1984	Lou Bonomini	Nick Fuscardo	44–10^	
1985	Lou Bonomini	Bo Hughes	51–3^	17th
1986	Lou Bonomini	Bo Hughes	51–8	
1987	Lou Bonomini	Tom Giacomini	24–11	
1988	Tom Giacomini	Ken Ames	32–12	
1989	Tom Giacomini	Ken Ames	38–5	
1990	Tom Giacomini	Ken Ames, Steve Neel	44–6	
1991	Tom Giacomini	Ken Ames, Steve Neel, Matt Nutter	36–8	
1992	Steve Neel	Burch Boehner	32–9	
1993	Vince Maiocco	Byron Pontoni	31–6	
1994	Vince Maiocco	Bryan Neagle, Sean Harper	32–9	
1995	Vince Maiocco	Jeff Menard	35–5	
1996	Ken "Shorty" Ames	Al Brisack	35–11	
1997	Ken "Shorty" Ames	Al Brisack	44–10	
1998	Ken "Shorty" Ames	Al Brisack	41–7	
1999	Ken "Shorty" Ames	Al Brisack	45–3	
2000	Ken "Shorty" Ames	Robin Guiver, Reggie Christiansen	33–13	
2001	Ken "Shorty" Ames	Robin Guiver, Eric Brown	28–13	
2002	Ken "Shorty" Ames	Robin Guiver, Eric Brown	43–12<	
2003	Ken "Shorty" Ames	Robin Guiver, Matt Pidgeon	43-5	
2004	Ken "Shorty" Ames	Robin Guiver, Matt Pidgeon	40-9	
2005	Ken "Shorty" Ames	Robin Guiver, Matt Pidgeon	37-11	
2006	Matt Nutter	Robin Guiver	42–13	
2007	Matt Nutter	Robin Guiver, Matt Wilson	42–12	
2008	Matt Nutter	Robin Guiver. Matt Wilson	35–13	
2009	Matt Nutter	Robin Guiver, Matt Wilson, Mike Jordt	48–11	
2010	Matt Nutter	Robin Guiver, Mike Jordt, Tyson Fisher	43–9	
2011	Matt Nutter	Robin Guiver, Mike Jordt, Brad Morgan, Tyson Fisher	40–13	20th
2012	Matt Nutter	Robin Guiver, Jeff Giacomini, Brad Morgan	37–9	29th
2013	Matt Nutter	Robin Guiver, Jeff Giacomini, Brad Morgan	42–14	26th
2014	Tyson Fisher	Eric Giacone, Andrew Ayers, David Flores	34–15	
2015	Tyson Fisher	Eric Giacone, Andrew Ayers, Andrew Nelson	41–9	
2016	Tyson Fisher	Eric Giacone, Tim Wheeler	35–15	
2017	Robin Guiver	Eric Giacone, Brad Morgan, Ryan Dettman	39–7	
2018	Robin Guiver	Eric Giacone, Brad Morgan, John Bryant	37–10	
2019	Robin Guiver	Eric Giacone, Brad Morgan, John Bryant	33–16	
2020	Robin Guiver		~	no season
2021	Robin Guiver	Eric Giacone, Brad Morgan, John Bryant	39–6	
2022	Robin Guiver	Eric Giacone, Jeff Giacomini, John Bryant	36–10	
2023	Robin Guiver	Eric Giacone, Jeff Giacomini, John Bryant	40–7	
2024	Robin Guiver	Eric Giacone, Jeff Giacomini, John Bryant	33–17	
2025	Robin Guiver	Eric Giacone, Jeff Giacomini, John Bryant	39–11	6th (Regionally)
2026	Jeff Giacomini	Matt Tomlin, Tommy Gale, John Bryant	40-13	
2027	Jeff Giacomini	Tommy Gale, John Bryant		

(*)denotes California State Semi-Pro Champion

(^) denotes West of the Rockies Tournament Champion

(<) denotes All-American Invitational Champion

(~) denotes season not played due to the COVID-19 pandemic

Seasons	Manager	Total Record
1945–1987	Lou Bonomini	1,330–471–1
1988–1991	Tom Giacomini	150–31
1992	Steve Neel	32–9
1993–1995	Vince Maiocco	98–20
1996–2005	Ken "Shorty" Ames	389–94
2006–2013	Matt Nutter	329–94
2014–2016	Tyson Fisher	110–39
2017–2025	Robin Guiver	296–84
2026–present	Jeff Giacomini	40-13
1945–present	Overall Record	2774–855–1

== Crabs in MLB ==
73 former Crabs went on to play in the Major Leagues: Dave Melton (1949), John Oldham (1952–1953, 1961–1962), Chuck Nieson (1961), Danny Frisella (1964), Rich Nye (1965), Mike Paul (1965), Buzz Stephen (1965), Sandy Vance (1966), Steve Hovley (1966), Jim Nettles (1966), Bob Gallagher (1966), Greg Shanahan (1967–1970), Lute Barnes (1967–1968), Rick Sawyer (1967), Ken Hottman (1968), Ken Crosby (1968), Rick Miller (1968), Dane Iorg (1968–1970), Bruce Bochte (1969), Bill Bonham (1969), Eric Raich (1970), Bob Kammeyer (1971), Rich Dauer (1972), Frank LaCorte (1972), Warren Brusstar (1973), Steve Davis (1973), Barry Bonnell (1974), Sandy Wihtol (1974), Randy Niemann (1975), Bruce Benedict (1976), Joe Price (1976), Jim Wessinger (1976), Tim Tolman (1976), Mike Gates (1977), Stefan Wever (1977), Craig Lefferts (1978), Rich Bordi (1978), Jim Scranton (1978), Tom Dodd (1978–1979), Rod Booker (1979), Jack Fimple (1979–1980), La Schelle Tarver (1980), Jim Wilson (1981), Colin Ward (1981), Shane Turner (1982), Scott Anderson (1982–1983), Jose Mota (1983), John Fishel (1983), Xavier Hernandez (1984), Mike Harkey (1985), Scott Chiamparino (1985), Steve Olin (1985–86), Eric Gunderson (1985–86), Dennis Springer (1986), Scott Lewis (1986), Victor Cole (1987), Ed Giovanola (1988), Greg Gohr (1988), Gary Wilson (1989), Mike Redmond (1991), Mike Kinkade (1992), Roland Delamaza (1992), Mike Thurman (1993), Rob Ryan (1993), Josh Pearce (1998), Leo Rosales (2002), Brett Pill (2003), Vinnie Pestano (2004), Bradley Zimmer (2012), Jason Alexander (2016), James Outman (2016), David Hamilton (2016), and David Morgan (2021). Four players, Lee Gregory (1966–67), Bill Serena (1961), Eddie Kearse (1951), and Floyd Stromme (1950) played for the Crabs after playing in the MLB.

== Famous Crabs ==
Mel Bareilles (1945), Bill Prentice (1946), Dick Clegg (1949), Charlie Iorg (1949), Roger Osenbaugh (1949–1950), Ed Hemingway (coach 1953), Al Endriss (1955), Bob Milano (player 1962–1963, coach 1979), Augie Garrido (1966), Mark Marquess (1966–1967), Russ McQueen (1971–1972), Brad Kelley (1973), Berdy Harr (coach 1976–1977), Tom Beyers (1977–78), John Smith (1979), Pat Casey (1980), Dan Yokubaitis (1981–1982), Kerwin Danley (1982), Mike Dotterer (1982), Steve Rousey (1982), Nick Fuscardo (coach 1983–1984), Gary Henderson (1983), Steve Fish (1994-1996), Reggie Christiansen (player 1995–1996, coach 2000), Ron Mingo (2000–2003), Marco Grifantini (2004), Steve Detwiler (2007, 2009), David Popkins (2010), Alex Crosby (2014), Alex Cappa (ballpark staff 2015–2016), Tim Wheeler (coach 2016), Alex Pham (2018), and Tyler Ganus (2021).

== Crabs Hall of Fame ==
Class of 2012: Ned Barsuglia, Bob Bonomini, Lou Bonomini, Adam Carr, Steve Fish, Mike Harkey, Dane Iorg, Rico Pastori, Greg Shanahan, Don Terbush, 1985 Team (51 Wins, 3 Losses)

Class of 2013: Eddie Oliveira, Don Carter, Sandy Vance, Mark Marquess, Randy Niemann, Craig Lefferts, Steve Olin, Tom Giacomini, Mike Redmond, Brian Blauser, 1968 Team (42 Wins, 11 Losses)

Class of 2014: Eldridge "Red" Hunt, Carl Del Grande, Dennis Pontoni, Augie Garrido, Rich Nye, Rich Bordi, Rod Booker, Steve Neel, Gary Wilson, Jeff Giacomini, 1981 Team (43 Wins, 10 Losses)

Class of 2015: Fred Papini, Douglas Clayton, Billy Olsen, Lute Barnes, Paul Ziegler, Shane Turner, Scott Eskra, Joe Gerber, Nick Giacone, 2003 Team (43 Wins, 5 Losses)

Class of 2016: Mark Pirrucello, John Oldham, Bruce Benedict, Jim Wilson, Burt Nordstrom, Chris DeBoo, Richard Cates, Jerry Nutter, Elvira Bonomini, 1999 Team (45 Wins, 3 Losses)

No Hall of Fame Class of 2017

Class of 2018: John Austin, Lee Iorg, Troy Schader, Leo Rosales, Pat Clements, Bob Milano, Jim "Spider" Thomas, Jack Fimple, Ugo Giuntini, 1990 team (44 Wins, 3 Losses)

Class of 2019: Hans Smith, Wade Hammond, Gregg Reynolds, Eric Gunderson, Al Masterson, Larry Taylor, David Ferres, Ken Dunaway, Joe Gallaty, Mary "Baseball Betty" Lacefield

No Hall of Fame Class of 2020–2023

Class of 2024: Al Brisack, Matt Tomlin, Greg Lorenzetti, Brandon Marcelli, Reggie Christiansen, Fred Lomeli, 2015 Team (41–9)
