= Far West League =

Far West League may refer to:

- Far West League (1948–1951), an American baseball minor league
- Far West League (collegiate summer baseball league)
