= Empire League =

Empire League may refer to:

== Sports ==
- Empire League (California), a high school league
- Empire Professional Baseball League, an independent American league
- Empire Football League, a semi-professional American league
- Empire Junior Hockey League, a Tier III American league

== British societies ==
- League of the Empire
- League of Empire Loyalists
- British Empire League

== See also ==
- Empire State League, a minor baseball league
- Desert Empire League, a high school league
- Inland Empire League, a minor baseball league
- Pacific Empire League, a collegiate summer baseball league
