= Bob Milano =

American baseball coach (1939 – 2025)

Biographical details
- Born: December 14, 1939; Oakdale, California, U.S.
- Died: September 15, 2025 (aged 85); Walnut Creek, California, U.S.

Playing career
- 1960–1961: Cal
- Position: Catcher

Coaching career (HC unless noted)
- 1962–1963: Cal (varsity assistant)
- 1964–1973: Burlingame High School
- 1974–1977: Cal (assistant coach)
- 1978–1999: Cal

Head coaching record
- Overall: 688–644–4 (college)
- Tournaments: NCAA: 20-14

Accomplishments and honors

Championships
- Pac-10 (1980)

Awards
- Pac-10 Coach of the Year (1980 and 1992); American Baseball Coaches Association Hall of Fame (2010); Cal Athletics Hall of Fame (2004); Cal Golden Bears No. 7 retired

Bob Milano (December 14, 1939 – September 15, 2025) was an American college baseball coach. He served as the head coach of the California Golden Bears from 1978 to 1999.

== Early life and playing career ==
Milano grew up in Oakland, California, and attended Bishop O'Dowd High School, graduating in 1957. Milano went on to play baseball for the California Golden Bears in 1960 and 1961, leading the 1960 team in hitting with a 357 average. Milano played summer baseball for the Lloydminster Meridians in the Western Canada Baseball League in 1960 and 1961.

After graduating from Cal, Milano was a varsity assistant for the Cal baseball team, while playing for the Humboldt Crabs in the summers of 1962 and 1963, playing in the National Baseball Congress World Series in 1963.

== Coaching career ==
After 10 years as head coach at Burlingame High School, Milano was an assistant coach at Cal under Jackie Jensen from 1974 to 1977, until he was chosen as the new Cal head coach in 1978.

Coach Milano returned to coach the Humboldt Crabs in 1979, with five of his Cal players, including Rod Booker, finishing with a record of 34–16 and a return trip to the NBC World Series in Wichita. Those five Cal players Coach Milano brought to the Crabs, formed the core of the 1980 Cal team who made the College World Series. He was inducted into the Humboldt Crabs Hall of Fame in 2018.

In 22 years at Cal, Coach Milano compiled a record of 688–644–4 (.516). His teams made the postseason six times, making the College World Series in 1980, 1988 and 1992. His Cal teams produced numerous future Major Leaguers including Bob Melvin, Jeff Kent, Lance Blankenship, Darren Lewis, Xavier Nady, and Rod Booker.

== Death ==
Milano died in Walnut Creek from Alzheimer's disease on September 15, 2025, at the age of 85.

== Head coaching records ==
Record table
Season	Team	Overall	Conference	Standing	Postseason
California (Pac-8/Pac-10) (1978–1999)
1978	California	35–27	6–12	T–3rd (Pac-8)	—
1979	California	31–25–1	16–14	3rd (Pac-10 South)	—
1980	California	44–23–1	17–13	T–1st (Pac-10 South)	7–3 (CWS, 3rd Place)
1981	California	31–31–1	12–18	5th (Pac-10 South	—
1982	California	29–32	9–17	5th (Pac-10 South)	—
1983	California	23–37	9–20	6th (Pac-10 South)	—
1984	California	39–28–1	12–18	4th (Pac-10 South)	—
1985	California	42–24	17–13	T–2nd (Pac-10 South)	0–2 (NCAA Regionals)
1986	California	32–25	10–20	6th (Pac-10 South)	—
1987	California	36–25	12–18	T–5th (Pac-10 South)	—
1988	California	40–25	16–14	T–3rd (Pac-10 South)	4–2 (CWS, T–7th Place)
1989	California	35–24	10–20	T–5th (Pac-10 South)	—
1990	California	18–43	3–27	6th (Pac-10 South)	—
1991	California	37–27	14–16	3rd (Pac-10 South)	3–2 (NCAA Regionals)
1992	California	35–28	14–16	T–3rd (Pac-10 South)	4–3 (CWS, T–7th Place)
1993	California	27–30	13–17	5th (Pac-10 South)	—
1994	California	25–35	12–18	4th (Pac-10 South)	—
1995	California	32–25	18–12	3rd (Pac-10 South)	1–2 (NCAA Regionals)
1996	California	27–29	10–20	5th (Pac-10 South)	—
1997	California	21–38	4–26	6th (Pac-10 South)	—
1998	California	22–32	5–24	6th (Pac-10 South)	—
1999	California	27–31	11–13	7th (Pac-10)	—
Cal:		688–644–4 (.516)	250–386 (.393)		
Total:		688–644–4			
National champion Postseason invitational champion Conference regular season champion Conference regular season and conference tournament champion Division regular season champion Division regular season and conference tournament champion Conference tournament champion

== International coaching ==
- USA Baseball Collegiate National Team Assistant Coach (1985)
- USA Baseball Olympic Assistant Coach (1988)
- USA Baseball Head Coach (1997)
