= Walnut Creek Crawdads =

Collegiate summer baseball team

- Logo

Information
- League: California Collegiate League
- Location: Danville, California
- Ballpark: Monte Vista High School Baseball Field
- Founded: 2006
- Nickname: Craws
- League championships: 0
- Former leagues: Far West League (2012–2013); California Collegiate League (2014–2017); Bay Area Collegiate League (2018)
- Colors: Red, Black, Grey, White
- Ownership: Marshall Murray
- General manager: TBA
- Manager: Brant Cummings
- Website: walnutcreekcrawdads.org

The Walnut Creek Crawdads are the collegiate summer baseball team based in Concord, California, and play their home games at Monte Vista High School Baseball Field in Danville, California. They are currently members of the California Collegiate League.

== History ==
The Crawdads were founded by local businessman Marshall Murray and began play in 2006 as a 501(c)(3) We are a non-profit organization dedicated to supporting amateur college baseball players by allowing them to gain experience and play games throughout their summer breaks using professional rules and equipment. They have been members of the California Collegiate League since their inception.

=== 2012–2013: Far West League ===
In 2013, the Crawdads held a 26–24 record and were managed by Paul Hewitt.

=== 2014–2017: California Collegiate League ===
In 2014, the Crawdads joined the California Collegiate League and played in the North Division. Future Major League Baseball infielder Miles Mastrobuoni played for the Crawdads.

=== 2018: Bay Area Collegiate League ===
In 2018, the Crawdads played in the Bay Area Collegiate League. The Crawdads did not play in 2019 or 2020 due to reorganization and COVID-19.

=== 2020–present: California Collegiate League (second stint) ===
In 2020, the Crawdads returned to the California Collegiate League. Since rejoining the league, the Crawdads have been managed by Brant Cummings through the 2024 season.

== Collegiate season-by-season results ==
Walnut Creek Crawdads
Season	League	Division	Overall	Win %	Conference	Win %	Finish	Manager	Playoffs
2012	FWL	–	?–?	?	8–13	.381	6th	?	Did not qualify
2013	FWL	–	26–24	.520	13–16	.448	6th	Paul Hewitt	Did not qualify
2014	CCL	North	22–25	.468	16–16	.500	T-1st	?	?
2015	CCL	North	13–29	.310	4–21	.160	3rd	Jordan Bautista	Did not qualify
2016	CCL	North	6–32	.158	4–23	.148	4th	Jordan Bautista	Did not qualify
2017	CCL	North	11–29	.275	8–24	.250	5th	Jordan Bautista	Did not qualify
2018	BACL	East Bay	10–11	.476	4–11	.267	3rd	Jordan Bautista	?
2019	Dormant year								
2020	CCL	North	Season cancelled (COVID-19 pandemic)						
2021	CCL	North	22–23	.489	12–18	.400	3rd	Brant Cummings	Did not qualify
2022	CCL	North	25–21	.543	18–16	.529	2nd	Brant Cummings	Lost wild card (Orange County); Lost elimination game (San Luis Obispo)
2023	CCL	North	33–10	.532	25–10	.714	2nd	Brant Cummings	Won wild card (Lincoln); Lost North Division finals (Healdsburg)
2024	CCL	North	26–15–1	.631	23–14	.622	1st	Brant Cummings	
Totals			194–219–1	.470	135–182	.426	—	—	—
