= Daniel Susac =

American baseball player (born 2001)

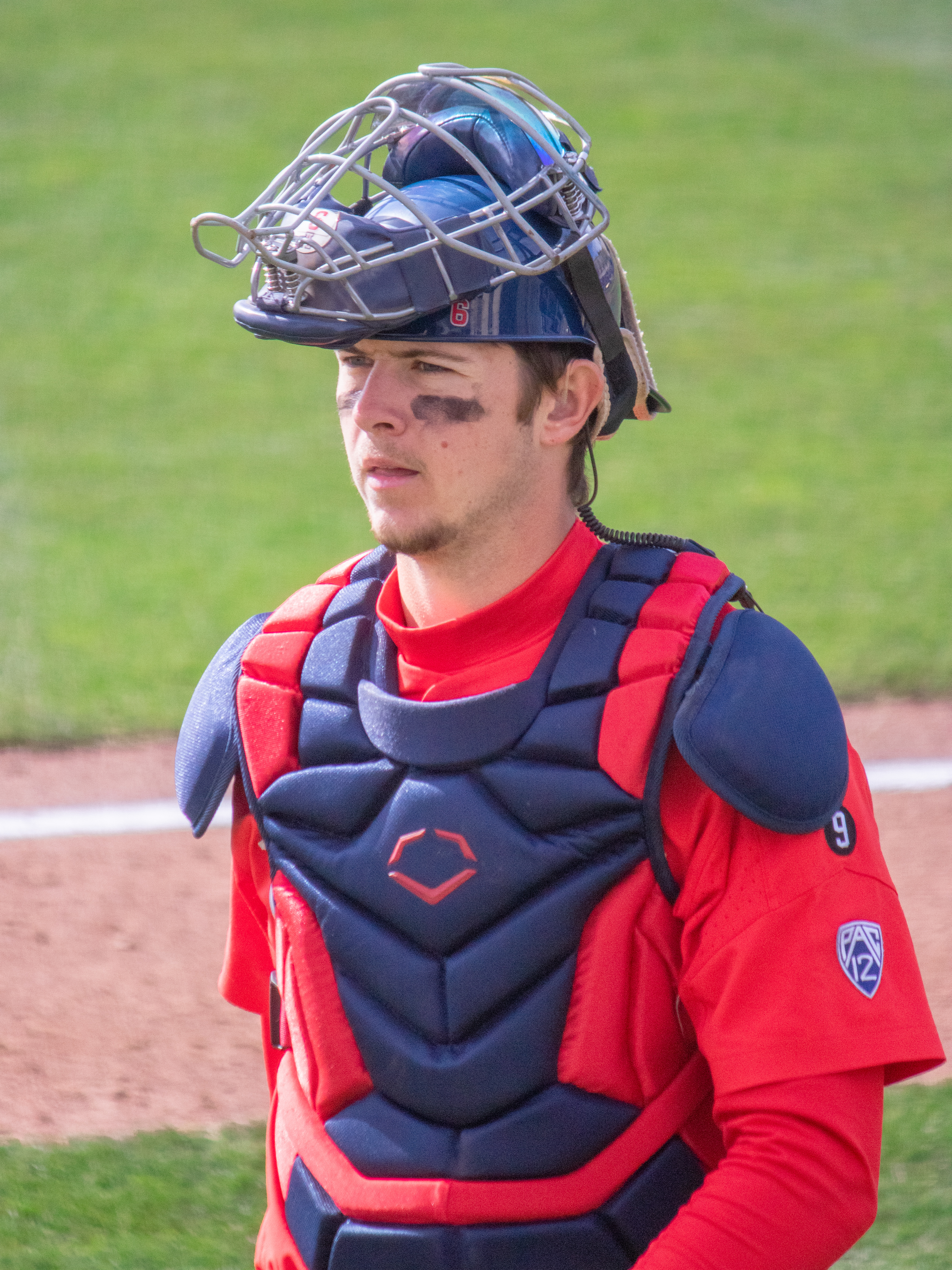
- Susac with Arizona in 2022

San Francisco Giants – No. 6
- Catcher
- Born: May 14, 2001 (age 25); Roseville, California, U.S.
- Bats: Right Throws: Right

MLB debut
- April 1, 2026, for the San Francisco Giants

MLB statistics (through 2026 season)
- Batting average: .243
- Home runs: 3
- Runs batted in: 22
- Stats at Baseball Reference

Teams
- San Francisco Giants (2026–present)

Daniel Shawn Susac (born May 14, 2001) is an American professional baseball catcher for the San Francisco Giants of Major League Baseball (MLB). He made his MLB debut in 2026.

== Amateur career ==
Susac attended Jesuit High School in Carmichael, California, a suburb of Sacramento, where he played football and baseball. As a junior in 2019, he hit .378. He played in the Under Armour All-America Baseball Game at Wrigley Field that summer. His senior season in 2020 was cut short due to the COVID-19 pandemic. He originally committed to play college baseball at Oregon State University, but switched his commitment to the University of Arizona.

Susac immediately became Arizona's starting catcher as a freshman in 2021, playing in 61 games with sixty being starts. He slashed .335/.383/.591 with 12 home runs, 64 RBIs, and 24 doubles, earning the title of Pac-12 Conference Freshman of the Year as well as being named All-Conference and to the All-Defensive Team. He was selected to play for the USA Baseball Collegiate National Team that summer. He also played for the Lincoln Potters of the California Collegiate League. Susac returned as Arizona's starting catcher in 2022 and entered the season as a top prospect for the upcoming draft. On March 14, 2022, he was named the National Player of the Week by Collegiate Baseball Newspaper as well as Pac-12 Player of the Week after he batted .526 with three home runs and 11 RBIs over four games. He finished the season having appeared in 64 games, compiling a .366/.430/.582 slash line with 12 home runs, 61 RBIs, and 100 hits. Following the season's end, he traveled to San Diego where he participated in the Draft Combine.

== Professional career ==
=== Oakland Athletics ===
The Oakland Athletics selected Susac in the first round, with the 19th overall selection, of the 2022 Major League Baseball draft. He signed with the team for $3.5 million.

Susac made his professional debut with the Arizona Complex League Athletics and was promoted to the Stockton Ports after two games. Over 27 games between both affiliates, he batted .298 with one home run and 15 RBI. Susac opened the 2023 season with the Lansing Lugnuts. He was promoted to the Midland RockHounds in late August. Over 112 games between the two affiliates, he slashed .300/.365/.428 with eight home runs and 62 RBI. Susac returned to Midland for the 2024 season, batting .257 with 12 home runs and fifty RBI over 88 games. After the season, he played in the Arizona Fall League. Susac was assigned to the Las Vegas Aviators for the 2025 season. Over 97 games, he hit .275 with 18 home runs and 68 RBI.

=== San Francisco Giants ===
On December 10, 2025, Susac was selected by the Minnesota Twins with the fourth overall selection of the Rule 5 draft, and subsequently traded to the San Francisco Giants. On March 25, 2026, the Giants announced that Susac had made the team's Opening Day roster.

Susac made his major league debut as a defensive substitute on April 1, against the San Diego Padres, replacing Patrick Bailey in the bottom of the seventh inning. The following day, against the New York Mets, Susac made his first major league start, recording a hit in his very first at-bat, and ended the day going 3-for-3 (all singles) with a walk. In his next start, against the Philadelphia Phillies on April 7, he started 2-for-2, becoming the first Giant in the modern era to go 5-for-5 in his first five at-bats. Susac finished that game 3-for-4, with an RBI triple. He hit his first MLB home run on July 29, a three-run home run off Milwaukee Brewers pitcher Thomas Pannone. On August 10, Susac was diagnosed with a fractured patella in his left knee, and missed the remainder of the season. Susac played in a total of 53 games for the Giants and batted .243 with three home runs and 22 RBI.

== Personal life ==
Susac's older brother, Andrew, played six seasons of Major League Baseball, also as a catcher. His cousin, Anthony, also played on the Arizona baseball team.

== See also ==
- Rule 5 draft results
