= Lincoln Potters =

Collegiate summer baseball team

- Logo

Information
- League: Pacific Empire League (2024-present)
- Location: Lincoln, California
- Ballpark: McBean Stadium
- Founded: 2016
- League championships: 0
- Division championships: 0
- Former league(s): Great West League (2017–2018); California Collegiate League (2019-2023)
- Colors: Navy Blue, Orange, White
- Ownership: Isabel Domeyko Taylor, Clifton Taylor, Matt Lundgren
- General manager: Matt Lundgren
- Manager: Eli Garcia
- Website: www.lincolnpotters.com

The Lincoln Potters are a collegiate wood bat baseball team based in Lincoln, California. They are operating as part of the summer collegiate wood bat league known as the Pacific Empire League. It began operations in 2016 as members of the Great West League. They play their home games at McBean Stadium in Lincoln. The Potters replaced the Lodi Crushers and Sacramento Stealth, who went inactive for 2017.

== History ==
The Potters were named for the former minor league baseball franchise that played in the Placer-Nevada Baseball League and that was founded by newspaper editor Allen "Scoop" Thurman of the Colfax Record back in 1923. They won PNL championships in 1926, 1941, 1950, 1951, 1952, 1954, 1956 and 1957 and played until 1968. They played under several different name such as Cubs, Tigers, Merchants, and eventually the Potters. They had sponsorship from Gladding McBean, a terra cotta and clay manufacturing company located in Lincoln that replaced much of the friezes and other ornamental decorative pieces that were destroyed in the 1906 San Francisco earthquake. The sewer pipe and roofing tile manufacturer was founded in 1875 and still operates today as one of California's oldest companies.

On October 4, 2018, the Potters announced that they were departing the Great West League to play in the California Collegiate League for 2019 and beyond after the GWL announced that they were ceasing operations.

On December 15, 2023, the Potters announced that they would be inaugural members of the new Pacific Empire League, a six-team league also consisting of the Healdsburg Prune Packers, Humboldt Crabs, Medford Rogues, Solano Mudcats and West Coast Kings.

=== Year-by-year record ===
==== Great West & CA Collegiate Leagues ====
Year	League	Affiliation	Record	Finish	Manager	Playoffs
2017	Great West League	none	35-25	3rd	Eric Bloom	Lost Opening Round to Chico Heat 2-1
2018	Great West League	none	N/A	2nd	Ryan Stevens	Lost Championship to Chico Heat 2-0
2019	California Collegiate League	none	28-18-1	2nd Northern Div.	Ryan Stevens	Lost NorCal Championship to Healdsburg Prune Packers 2-0
2020	Independent	none	16-4	none	Ryan Stevens	none
2021	California Collegiate League	none	36-23	2nd Northern Div.	Ryan Stevens	Lost in CCL State Championship Tournament
2022	California Collegiate League	none	32-23	3rd Northern Div.	Ryan Stevens	none
2023	California Collegiate League	none	32-20	3rd Northern Div.	Jon Peters	none

== MLB alumni ==
Daniel Susac
