= Derrek Lee =

American baseball player (born 1975)

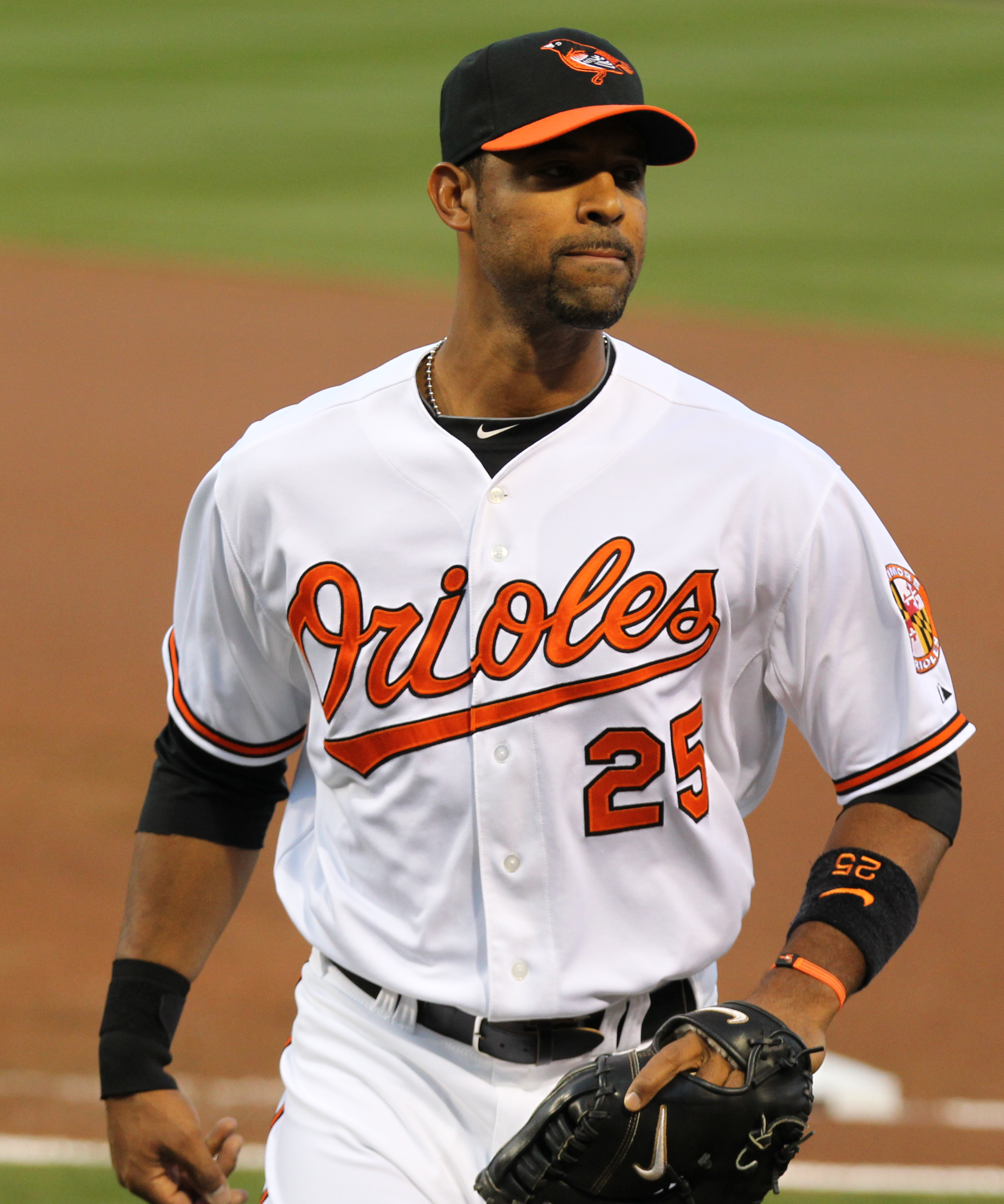
- Lee with the Baltimore Orioles in 2011
- First baseman
- Born: September 6, 1975 (age 50); Sacramento, California, U.S.
- Batted: Right Threw: Right

MLB debut
- April 28, 1997, for the San Diego Padres

Last MLB appearance
- September 28, 2011, for the Pittsburgh Pirates

MLB statistics
- Batting average: .281
- Home runs: 331
- Runs batted in: 1,078
- Stats at Baseball Reference

Teams
- San Diego Padres (1997); Florida Marlins (1998–2003); Chicago Cubs (2004–2010); Atlanta Braves (2010); Baltimore Orioles (2011); Pittsburgh Pirates (2011)

Career highlights and awards
- 2× All-Star (2005, 2007); World Series champion (2003); 3× Gold Glove Award (2003, 2005, 2007); Silver Slugger Award (2005); NL batting champion (2005); Chicago Cubs Hall of Fame

Derrek Leon Lee (born September 6, 1975), nicknamed "D-Lee", is an American former professional baseball first baseman. Lee played with the San Diego Padres, Florida Marlins, Chicago Cubs, Atlanta Braves, Baltimore Orioles and Pittsburgh Pirates of Major League Baseball (MLB).

Lee was a World Series champion with the Marlins in 2003, and he won the National League batting title in 2005. He was a two-time All-Star selection, and won the Gold Glove Award three times.

== Early life ==
Lee was born on September 6, 1975, in Sacramento, California. His father Leon played professional baseball in Japan in NPB, and his uncle Leron also played in both MLB and NPB. During his elementary years, Lee lived in Japan, and during his high school years, he often stayed in Japan during his summer breaks. He played Little League Baseball at Whitney Little League and graduated from El Camino High School in 1993.

== Professional career ==
=== San Diego Padres ===
Lee was drafted in the first round (14th overall) of the 1993 MLB draft by the San Diego Padres, and made his MLB debut on April 28, 1997.

=== Florida Marlins ===
Lee was traded, along with prospects, to the Florida Marlins a year later for Kevin Brown, Lee was a member of the 2003 World Series Marlins championship team. Lee won his first Gold Glove during the 2003 championship season and his spectacular grab and unassisted putout on a hard-hit Hideki Matsui one-hop line drive snuffed out a Yankees rally and ended Game 5 of the World Series with a Marlins victory. The Marlins went on to win the World Series in Game 6.

=== Chicago Cubs ===
Lee was traded to the Cubs for Hee-seop Choi, who, coincidentally, had been scouted by Lee's father years before. He hit .278 with 32 home runs and 98 RBIs in his first year with the Cubs. In 2005, Lee had a career first half of the season, with an MLB-leading .376 batting average, 72 RBIs, and a tie for the major league lead in home runs with 27.

The Cubs had traded superstar Sammy Sosa, who had previously been one of their best hitters, before the 2005 season. Lee showed early on that he could more than compensate for the loss, and while Sosa had a disappointing 2005 season with the Baltimore Orioles, Lee had a career year. By midseason, he was among MLB's leaders in each of the triple crown categories: batting average, home runs, and RBIs. Lee finished the season with a career-high 46 home runs and led the National League in batting average (.335), slugging percentage (.662), on-base plus slugging (1.080), hits (199), doubles (50), extra-base hits (99), total bases (393), and runs created (167). His batting average was the highest by a Cub since Bill Madlock's .339 in 1976 and made him the first Cub since Bill Buckner in 1980 to win a National League batting title. Lee became the first player in major league history to record 50 doubles, 40 home runs, and 15 stolen bases in one season. He also finished third in NL MVP voting and won the NL Gold Glove and Silver Slugger awards at first base that year.

Lee was named to the U.S. roster for the 2006 World Baseball Classic, where he was the first player to hit a home run for Team USA in the World Baseball Classic.

On April 10, 2006, Lee signed a five-year, $65 million extension with the Chicago Cubs. The deal replaced his contract for the 2006 season and extended him as the Cubs' first baseman through the 2010 season and included a no-trade clause. He broke his wrist less than two weeks later, in a collision involving baserunner Rafael Furcal, and he missed 59 games due to the injury. The Cubs posted a 19–40 record during Lee's stint on the disabled list. Later, Lee went back on the disabled list with a post-traumatic inflammation in the outer bone of the medial side of the wrist.

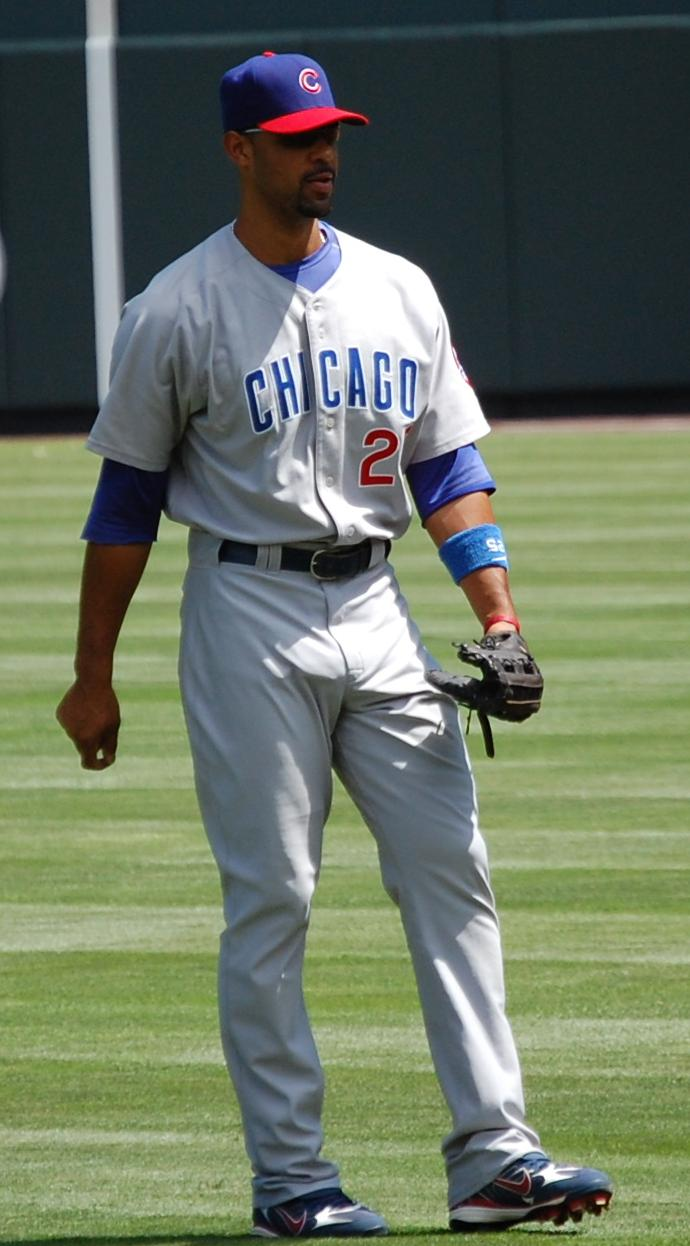
Lee takes the field.

In 2008, Lee hit 20 home runs, 90 RBIs and had a .291 batting average as the Cubs had the best regular-season record in the National League, leading the Cubs to the NL Central championship, later losing in the NLDS to the Los Angeles Dodgers, 3–0. In 2009, Lee overcame a slow start with a 21-game hitting streak from May 29 until June 24 and finished ninth in the voting for NL MVP, as he had a .306 batting average, and hit for 35 home runs and 111 RBIs.

On June 9, 2010, Lee hit his 300th career home run in a game against the Milwaukee Brewers.

On June 25, 2010, Lee was involved in a dugout altercation with Cubs pitcher Carlos Zambrano after the pitcher gave up four runs in the first inning and apparently blamed Lee for failing to field a sharply-hit lead-off double. Zambrano was suspended for his behavior.

=== Atlanta Braves ===
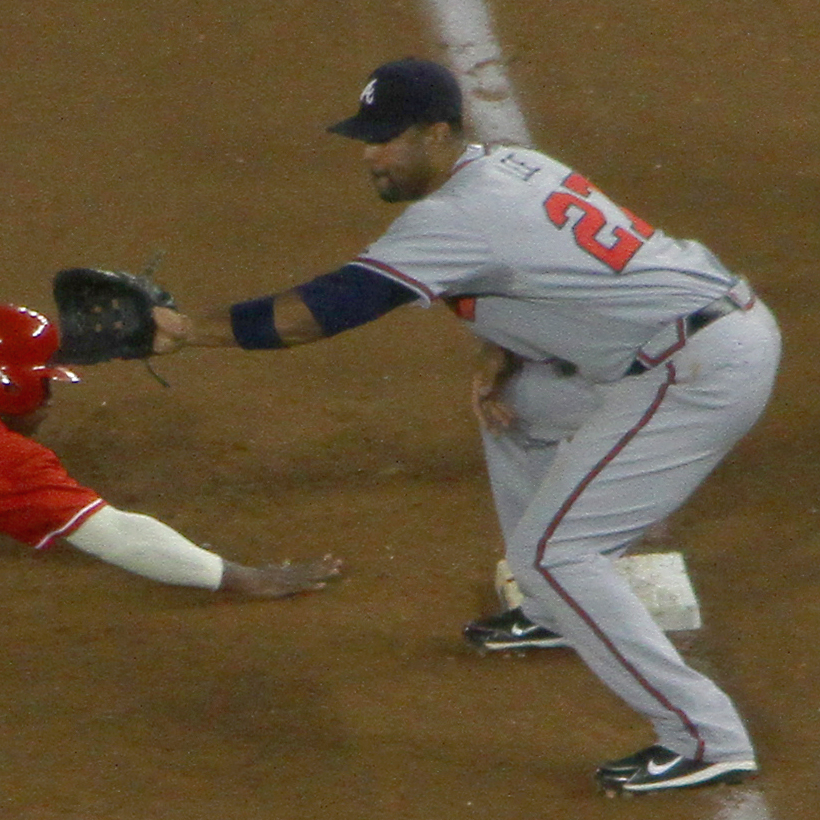
Lee playing for the Braves.

In late July 2010, Lee used his 10-and-5 rights to veto a trade to the Los Angeles Angels. On August 18, 2010, Lee, with his approval, was traded to the Atlanta Braves for minor league pitching prospects Robinson Lopez, Tyrelle Harris, and Jeffrey Lorick. Lee began to serve as the Braves' starting first baseman on August 20, 2010, including postseason play in the NLDS.

=== Baltimore Orioles ===
Lee was signed from free agency to a one-year contract with the Baltimore Orioles for the 2011 season. He played in 85 games with the last place Orioles, batting .246 with 12 home runs and 41 runs batted in.

=== Pittsburgh Pirates ===
On July 30, 2011, Lee was traded to the Pirates for minor league Class A first baseman Aaron Baker and cash considerations. Lee hit two home runs in his first game as a Pirate. He was hit by a pitch and broke a bone in his left wrist on August 3, and missed most of the next month, but then finished the season productively as the Pittsburgh first baseman. Playing in 28 games as a Pirate in 2011, Lee batted .337 with seven home runs and 18 RBIs.

== Personal life ==
Lee is the son of Leon Lee. Leon never played in the Major Leagues, but did play professionally in Japan. Today, he is a scout for Major League Baseball and, coincidentally, he was the scout who "found" Hee-Seop Choi, who was later traded for his son. Lee is the nephew of former Major League outfielder Leron Lee, who played eight seasons with the St. Louis Cardinals, Dodgers, Indians, and Padres. Currently, he works with the Cincinnati Reds as an advising batting coach to scouted players.

=== Project 3000 ===
In September 2006, Lee's three-year-old daughter Jada was diagnosed with Leber's congenital amaurosis, a rare genetic disease resulting in loss of vision. Lee and Boston Celtics co-owner and CEO Wyc Grousbeck with the University of Iowa established Project 3000 in an effort to eradicate the disease, which affects both their families. Lee guest starred in an episode of NBC's drama series ER, "Gravity", which was first broadcast in October 2007. Lee agreed to the brief appearance because the producers of ER aired an episode in January 2008 that deals with Leber's congenital amaurosis. Lee's efforts to raise awareness and funds for research into the condition have helped to raise over $1,000,000 of additional research funds. An eventual cure for the disease depends greatly on getting data on patients and Lee's support has had a significant impact both in fundraising and testing patients who have the disease.

In 2009, Lee revealed that Jada had been misdiagnosed and does not have the disease, but Lee continues to be active in raising money for Project 3000.

=== 1st Touch Foundation ===
The 1st Touch Foundation was established in 2005 by Lee and his wife as a vehicle to encourage and support the educational aspirations of the community's young people. The initial vision was to build The 1st Touch Academic Youth Center in Sacramento, California. In 2009, Lee unveiled a cabernet wine called CaberLee through Charity Wines where 100% of the proceeds will benefit the 1st Touch Foundation. However, in September 2012, the foundation closed after helping children in Sacramento for seven years.

Lee has visited countries such as Uganda and Israel to help out with the baseball programs. He visited the Israel Baseball Academy in 2015 helping them out with skills while visiting the country.

== See also ==
- List of Major League Baseball career home run leaders
- List of Major League Baseball batting champions
- List of Major League Baseball annual doubles leaders

Awards and achievements
Preceded by Adrián Beltré; Ryan Howard	National League Player of the Month; April 2005; September 2009	Succeeded by Bobby Abreu; Kelly Johnson
Preceded by Barry Bonds	National League Slugging Percentage Champion; 2005	Succeeded by Albert Pujols
