= Leon Lee =

American baseball player (born 1952)

- First baseman
- Born: December 4, 1952 (age 73); Sacramento, California, U.S.
- Batted: Right Threw: Right

NPB debut
- 1978, for the Lotte Orions

Last NPB appearance
- 1987, for the Yakult Swallows

NPB statistics
- Batting average: .308
- Hits: 1,436
- Home runs: 268
- Runs batted in: 884
- Stats at Baseball Reference

Managerial statistics
- Wins: 41
- Losses: 76
- Ties: 3

Teams
- As player: Lotte Orions (1978–1982); Yokohama Taiyō Whales (1983–1985); Yakult Swallows (1986–1987); As manager: Orix BlueWave (2003)

Leon Lee (born December 4, 1952) is an American former professional baseball player and manager, primarily known for his career in Japan. He played first base, third base, and catcher during his career, batting and throwing right-handed. Lee had a ten-year career in Nippon Professional Baseball (NPB). At the conclusion of his playing career, he was considered one of the greatest foreign players to have played in the NPB. Later, he became the first African-American manager in Japanese baseball history.

He is the father of former MLB player Derrek Lee and the brother of former MLB player Leron Lee. In fact, Leron and Leon played 3 seasons together as teammates on the Lotte Orions in Japan.

== Career ==
=== American baseball career ===
Leon Lee was selected in the ninth round (198th overall) by the St. Louis Cardinals in the 1971 draft. He spent seven years in the Cardinals' minor league system without playing in a Major League Baseball (MLB) game.

=== Japanese baseball career ===
With the support of his older brother, former American Major League player Leron Lee, who was playing for the Lotte Orions, a Nippon Professional Baseball (NPB) team, Leon was able to make the move to Japan. Lee played five seasons alongside his older brother, hitting 41 home runs, 116 RBIs, with a .340 batting average in 1980. His batting average that year was the second-highest in the Pacific League, behind his brother's average.

Lee was traded to the Yokohama Taiyo Whales, as the Orions were targeting to get closer Steve Shirley, where he played from 1983 to 1985. He finished his career in Japan with the Yakult Swallows from 1986 to 1987 before returning to the United States.

=== Scouting and managing ===
His past experience in Japan helped him become the Pacific Rim scout for the Chicago Cubs in 1998.

After the 2002 MLB season, Lee left the Cubs and returned to Japan to serve as the Orix BlueWave's hitting coach for the 2003 NPB season. The manager, Hiromichi Ishige, was fired in April, and Lee was promoted to manager, becoming the first African-American manager in Japanese baseball history. On May 17, 2003, the BlueWave faced the Nippon Ham Fighters, managed by Trey Hillman, for a battle between two American managers in Japan for the first time in 28 years. The Blue Waves were a good offensive team, but the pitching staff posted a 5.95 team ERA, and the team finished in last place with a 48–88–4 record. The club hired a Japanese manager for the next season and Lee was offered, but declined, the hitting coach position.

==== Brooklyn Cyclones ====
In February 2004, Lee was hired to manage the Brooklyn Cyclones, a Class-A New York Mets minor-league affiliate. On April 8, he was arrested for indecent exposure in a hotel after seeking to quiet a noisy late-night crowd that was disturbing his team. While the charges were still pending, he was forced to resign before managing his first game. Although Lee pressed for a court date to clear his name, the charges were dropped in 2005.

==== Sacramento Stealth ====
In 2016, he became owner of the Sacramento Stealth of the new collegiate wood bat Great West League.
