= Leron Lee =

American baseball player (born 1948)

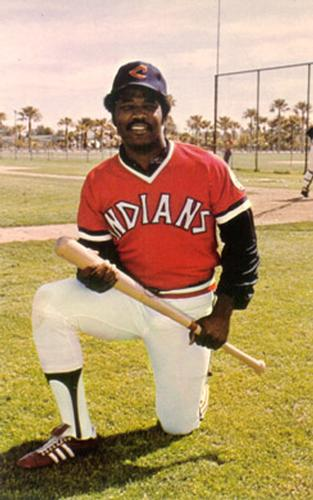
- Outfielder
- Born: March 4, 1948 (age 78); Bakersfield, California, U.S.
- Batted: Left Threw: Right

Professional debut
- MLB: September 5, 1969, for the St. Louis Cardinals
- NPB: April 2, 1977, for the Lotte Orions

Last appearance
- MLB: October 3, 1976, for the Los Angeles Dodgers
- NPB: October 20, 1987, for the Lotte Orions

MLB statistics
- Batting average: .250
- Home runs: 31
- Runs batted in: 152

NPB statistics
- Batting average: .320
- Home runs: 283
- Runs batted in: 912
- Stats at Baseball Reference

Teams
- St. Louis Cardinals (1969–1971); San Diego Padres (1971–1973); Cleveland Indians (1974–1975); Los Angeles Dodgers (1975–1976); Lotte Orions (1977–1987)

Career highlights and awards
- 4× NPB All-Star (1977, 1979–1981); 4× Best Nine Award (1977, 1980, 1984, 1985)

Leron Lee (born March 4, 1948) is an American former professional baseball left fielder. He played eight seasons with the St. Louis Cardinals, Los Angeles Dodgers, Cleveland Indians and San Diego Padres of Major League Baseball (MLB). He then played eleven seasons in Japan's Nippon Professional Baseball for the Lotte Orions, where he was a four-time All-Star and a four-time Best Nine Award-winner. His nephew Derrek Lee also played in MLB.

== Early life and United States baseball career ==
Lee, the oldest of six children, graduated from Grant High School in Sacramento with 36 football scholarship offers from major four-year universities. Instead, he began his professional career at 18 as the number one draft pick of the St. Louis Cardinals in September 1969 after an excellent season at Tulsa where he batted .303. His first major league hit was off Jerry Robertson of the Montreal Expos. In 1970 he had ten multi-hit games, including two games with three hits, a tie breaking home run against the Dodgers and his first major league home run off future Hall of Famer Ferguson Jenkins.

On June 11, 1971, after three seasons with the Cardinals, Leron was traded to the San Diego Padres where he had nineteen multi-hit games, including one memorable game against Cincinnati where he had three hits, including two doubles. On July 25, 1971, a home run off Bob Johnson led to a 2-1 win against Pittsburgh in the first game of a double-header. For the season, Leron batted .273. The following year, 1972, Leron batted .300 with an amazing thirty four multi- hit games, including six three-hit games.

On July 4, 1972, Lee broke up a no-hit bid by Tom Seaver of the New York Mets. Lee singled with one out in the ninth inning.

Once again, after three seasons with the Padres, Leron was purchased by the Cleveland Indians where he had thirteen multi-hit games. In a game against the Royals he hit a home run then a grand slam to drive in all five runs for a 5-2 victory.

After signing with the Dodgers as a free agent, he remained for two seasons before ending his major league career to pursue a baseball career in Japan.

== Japanese baseball career ==
Following his major league career, he played for the Lotte Orions in Japan from 1977 to 1987. From his retirement to early 2018, he held the Japanese record for career batting average (players with more than 4,000 at bats). Norichika Aoki overtook him upon returning from MLB. Lee led the league in home runs and runs batted in in his first season, and won the batting title in 1980. In 1978, he invited younger brother Leon Lee (the father of former Major League Baseball player Derrek Lee) to play in Japan, and the brothers formed a feared cleanup for the Orions.

Before the arrival of Lee, foreign players mostly played in Japan when their careers were winding down. Lee revolutionized the Japanese view of foreign players by playing in Japan during his prime, raising the standard for all foreign players thereafter.

== Coaching career ==
After retiring from Japanese baseball, he went on to become the batting coach for the Oakland Athletics in 1989 when they won the World Series. Currently, he works with the Cincinnati Reds as an advising batting coach to scouted players.
