= Larry Wolfe =

American baseball player (born 1953)

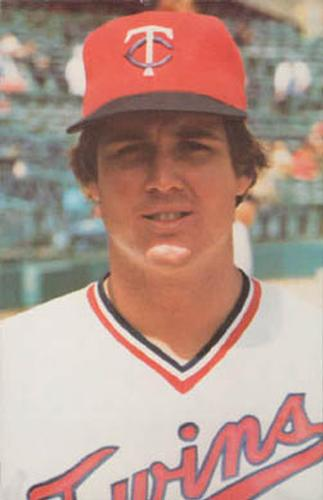
- Third baseman
- Born: March 2, 1953 (age 72); Melbourne, Florida, U.S.
- Batted: Right Threw: Right

MLB debut
- September 16, 1977, for the Minnesota Twins

Last MLB appearance
- October 5, 1980, for the Boston Red Sox

MLB statistics
- Batting average: .230
- Home runs: 7
- Runs batted in: 50

NPB statistics
- Batting average: .224
- Home runs: 14
- Runs batted in: 45
- Stats at Baseball Reference

Teams
- Minnesota Twins (1977–1978); Boston Red Sox (1979–1980); Kintetsu Buffaloes (1982)

Laurence Marcy Wolfe (born March 2, 1953, in Melbourne, Florida) is a former professional baseball player. He played all or part of four seasons in Major League Baseball, primarily as a third baseman. He also played one season in Japan in 1982. Wolfe attended Sacramento City College.

== Baseball career ==
Larry Wolfe was drafted in the 21st round of the 1971 amateur draft by the Los Angeles Dodgers, and again in the fourth round of the 1972 amateur draft by the New York Yankees, but did not sign with either team. In 1973, he was drafted in the ninth round by the Minnesota Twins, this time signing a contract.

From 1973 to 1977 he played in the minor leagues on Twins affiliate teams, making his Major League debut with them in September 1977. In his 1978, Wolfe was named to the opening day starting lineup for the Twins. On June 3, 1978, Wolfe recorded his first multi-home run game against the Detroit Tigers, launching his first homer in the top of the fourth inning against pitcher Bob Sykes, a solo shot. He added his second homer of the game the following inning, this time a three-run shot, off of pitcher Steve Foucault.

After spending the full 1978 season with the Twins, he was traded to the Boston Red Sox for Dave Coleman. He spent the 1979 and 1980 seasons with the Red Sox. On June 13, 1979, Wolfe recorded his second career multi-home run game against the Kansas City Royals, launching solo home runs in the third and fourth innings against pitcher Larry Gura.

In 1981, Wolfe returned to the minor leagues and played for the Indianapolis Indians, then an affiliate for the Cincinnati Reds. In 1982, Wolfe played in Japan for the Kintetsu Buffaloes.

In November 2015, Wolfe was named manager of the Sacramento Stealth of the Great West League, a collegiate summer baseball league.
