= California Seals (collegiate summer baseball team) =

US collegiate summer baseball team

- Logo

Information
- League: Far West League (North Division)
- Location: Berkeley, California
- Ballpark: Evans Diamond
- Founded: 1956
- Colors: Black, Charcoal and White

The California Seals are a collegiate summer baseball team that will play in the North Division of the Far West League. They will begin play in 2011 in the new league at Evans Diamond Ballpark in Berkeley, California. They are a former member of the West Coast Tri-State League, which merged with the Pacific West Baseball League to form the new FWL.
