= Fontanetti's Athletics =

Fontanetti’s Athletics

Information
- League: Independent (Northern California)
- Location: San Jose, California
- Founded: 1965
- California State Semi-Pro championships: 1978
- Former name: Fontanetti A’s, Fontanetti’s of San Jose, San Jose Fontanettis, Fontanetti Sporting Goods of San Jose
- Former league(s): Far West League (2011-2013); Western Baseball Association (1983-97)
- Former ballpark: San José High School
- Colors: Navy Blue, Powder Blue, and White
- Ownership: Jerry Fontanetti

Fontanetti’s were a collegiate summer baseball team located in San Jose, California, founded in 1965, as a successor to previous teams managed by Jerry Fontanetti in the 1950s. Founder Jerry Fontanetti was the owner of Fontanetti’s Batting Cages, which operated in San Jose from 1953 until 2016.

The team was first called Fontanetti’s of San Jose, named for owner Jerry Fontanetti’s San Jose batting cages. Fontanetti's was a successor to the Jerry Fontanetti managed San Jose All-Stars, whose 1958 team included Hal Kolstad and former Oakland Athletics owner Stephen Schott.

Fontanetti’s was a powerhouse semi-pro baseball team in Northern California with prominent rivals included other perennial winners such as the Humboldt Crabs. Fontanetti's roster often consisted of players from San Jose State, De Anza College and other college players who went to high school nearby in Sunnyvale, Saratoga, Santa Clara and San Jose.

In the 1970s, at the height of the rival Humboldt Crabs, Fontanetti’s were California State Semi-Pro runners up in 1976 and 1977 losing to the Crabs before beating the Crabs and winning the 1978 California State Championship. With the win, Fontanetti’s broke the Crabs’ streak of 15 straight California State Semi-Pro Championships and represented California at the National Baseball Congress World Series in Wichita. Fontanetti's added three Crabs to their roster (Tom Beyers, Larry Kuhn and Rich Bordi), and entered the NBC Tournament in Wichita ranked #4 overall, winning their first game 8 to 6 against the Chattanooga Signal Barbers, before losing 2 to 1 to the Hutchinson Broncs, and being eliminated by a 10-0 loss to the Olympia Brewers from Pueblo, Colorado.

Fontanetti's also made multiple appearances in the AABC Stan Musial World Series, including 2003 and 2008.

After more than 50 seasons, the Fontanetti’s A’s played their final season in 2014, the year before Fontanetti’s Batting Cages closed in 2016.

== Notable alumni ==
- Frank Johnson (1976-1980)
- Rich Bordi (1978)
- Ron Mingo, World's Fastest Typist (1981-1999)

== Managers ==
- Jerry Fontanetti (1965-1973, 1978-79)
- Phil Couchee (1974-77)
- Frank Johnson (1980)
- Tim Day (1982)
- Charlie Sherrill (1984)
- Keith Wade (1989-91)
- J. "Boom" Nelson (2000)
- Greg Mugg (2008-10)
- Steve Cannady (2011, 2014)
- Jerry McClain (2012)
