= Sacramento Stealth =

- Logo

Information
- League: Great West League (2016)
- Location: Sacramento, California
- Ballpark: Renfree Field, Traveling team←
- Founded: 2015
- Folded: 2016
- League championships: 0
- Division championships: 0
- Former name: None
- Former league: None
- Colors: Dark Blue, Gray, White and Black
- Ownership: Leon Lee
- General manager: TBD
- Manager: Larry Wolfe (head coach)
- Website: www.sacstealth.com

The Sacramento Stealth were a collegiate woodbat baseball team based in Sacramento, California. They are charter members of the Great West League. They were owned by former Minor League Baseball and Japanese Baseball standout Leon Lee and were run by general manager Matt Lundgren (now GM of the Lincoln Potters). Their head coach was Larry Wolfe. The team played in the same city as the minor-league Sacramento River Cats of the Pacific Coast League, but share no affiliation, and the Sacramento Heat of the Golden State Collegiate Baseball League.

They were to have played their home games at historic Renfree Field in Sacramento, but the field was not quite ready for on-field play due to stalled talks about renovating the field for future use by amateur and high school teams. So the league decided to make the Stealth a traveling team for the 2016 season. Plans were set to make the field ready for play in 2017, but the team has since gone dormant.

== Staff ==
- Leon Lee - Owner
- TBD - General Manager
- Larry Wolfe - Field Manager (Head Coach)
- Eddie Cervantes - Assistant Coach
- Danny Royster - Director of Baseball Operations
