= Brandon Poulson =

American baseball player (born 1990)

- Pitcher
- Born: February 16, 1990 (age 35); Santa Rosa, California, U.S.
- Bats: Right Throws: Right
- Stats at Baseball Reference

Brandon Clifford Poulson (born February 16, 1990) is an American former professional baseball pitcher in Minor League Baseball. The Minnesota Twins signed Poulson out of the Academy of Art University, when he demonstrated that he could throw a fastball of 100 miles per hour (160 km/h).

== Career ==
Poulson attended Piner High School in Santa Rosa, California. He tried out for the school's baseball team, but did not make it as a freshman. After he graduated, he enrolled at Santa Rosa Junior College, where he played American football as a linebacker for two years.

After a year, Poulson went to work for his father's excavation business as a truck driver. His father encouraged him to give sports another try, so he joined a Sunday night league. There, he was referred to a coach of the Academy of Art University's baseball team, and the school offered Poulson a scholarship to enroll. His only season for the Urban Knights was not successful, however, with an 8.38 earned run average (ERA) in 19 1/3 innings pitched. After the season, he joined the Healdsburg Prune Packers of the Golden State Collegiate Baseball League. Through coaching, he became able to throw a 100 miles per hour (160 km/h) fastball. He recorded a 1.45 ERA with 31 strikeouts in 12 1/3 innings, allowing only six hits.

Poulson was not selected in the 2014 Major League Baseball draft. After the draft, Poulson threw for scouts at the Art Academy, who were impressed with his velocity. The Twins signed Poulson to a free agent contract with a $250,000 signing bonus. He made his professional debut with the Elizabethton Twins of the Rookie-level Appalachian League. In six games with Elizabethton, he struck out nine batters in 7 1/3 innings, but walked 13 en route to an 8.59 ERA.

Poulson improved in 2015 with the GCL Twins of the Gulf Coast League, whiffing 26 batters in 20 1/3 innings and recording a 3.10 ERA and his first professional win. However, the Twins decided the 25-year-old no longer fit into their plans and released him. On April 5, 2016, Poulson signed with the Southern Maryland Blue Crabs of the Atlantic League of Professional Baseball, but was cut in spring training. Poulson moved on to the Joliet Slammers of the independent Frontier League and pitched five innings spread over eight games, allowing only four hits—but his control continued be a problem, as he allowed fifteen walks and twelve runs scored. The Slammers released Poulson, and as of 2018 he has not signed with another team.
