= Jake Scheiner =

American baseball player (born 1995)

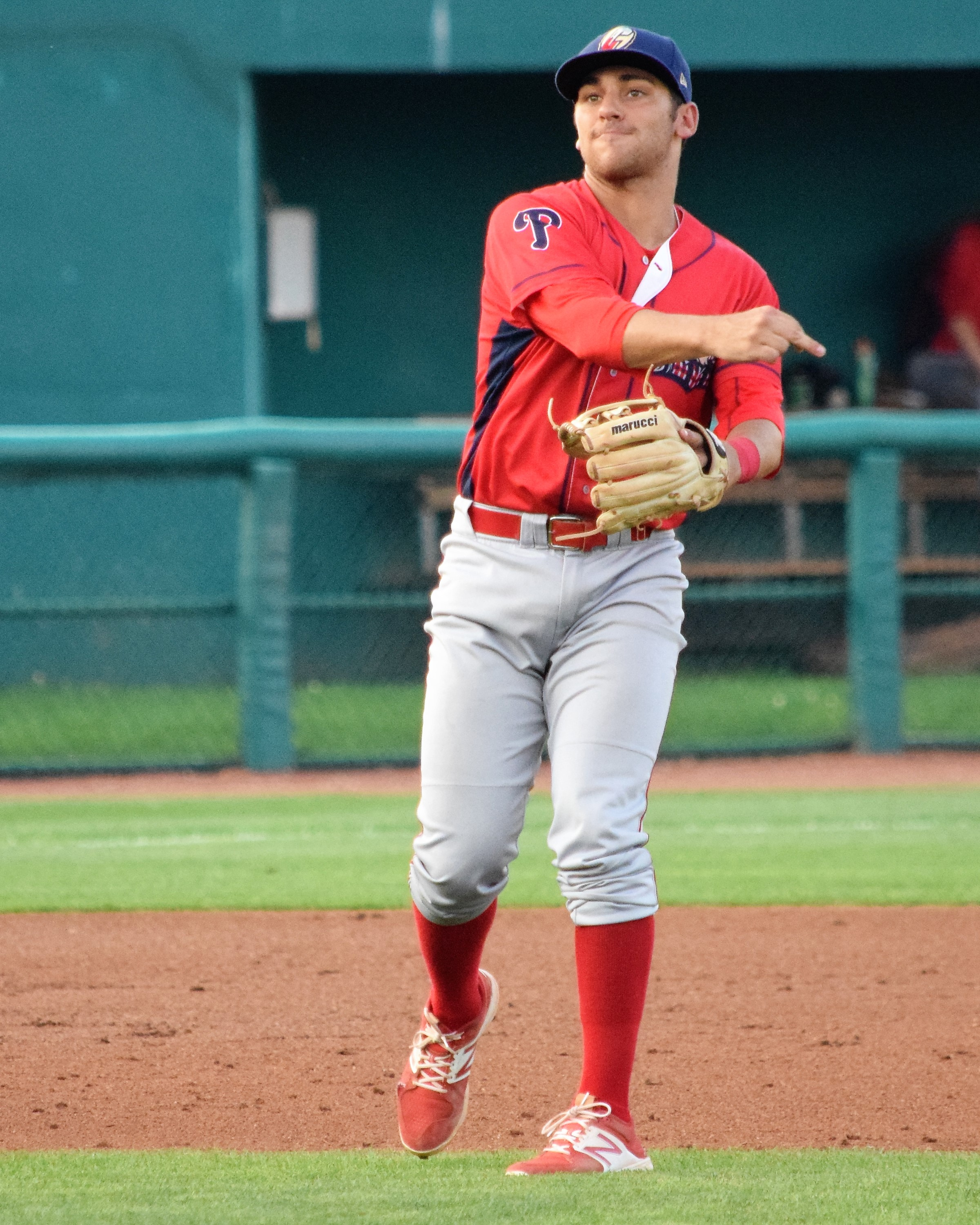
- Scheiner with the Crosscutters in 2017
- Infielder / Outfielder
- Born: August 13, 1995 (age 31); San Mateo, California, U.S.
- Batted: Right Threw: Right

NPB debut
- March 29, 2024, for the Hiroshima Toyo Carp

Last NPB appearance
- July 31, 2024, for the Hiroshima Toyo Carp

NPB statistics
- Batting average: .133
- Home runs: 1
- Runs batted in: 5
- Stats at Baseball Reference

Teams
- Hiroshima Toyo Carp (2024)

Jake Maxwell Scheiner (born August 13, 1995) is an American former professional baseball infielder and outfielder. He played in Nippon Professional Baseball (NPB) for the Hiroshima Toyo Carp. He was selected by the Philadelphia Phillies in the fourth round of the 2017 Major League Baseball draft.

== Early life and high school ==
Scheiner was born in San Mateo, California, to Jeff and Tani Scheiner, and is Jewish. His siblings are Sam and Sophie.

Scheiner attended Maria Carrillo High School in Santa Rosa, California, playing shortstop and pitching for the varsity baseball team for four years, while also playing for the basketball team. He was First Team All-North Bay League in 2012 and 2013, and First Team All-Empire in 2014. He was not drafted out of high school in the 2014 Major League Baseball draft.

== College ==
Scheiner enrolled at Santa Rosa Junior College, where he played college baseball. Scheiner redshirted as a freshman at Santa Rosa in 2015. In 2016, as a redshirt freshman, he hit .402/.486/.674 with 51 runs, eight home runs, and 61 runs batted in (RBIs) in 184 at bats over 47 games. He was named Big 8 Most Valuable Player, NorCal Player of the Year, First Team All-American, and State Championship MVP.

Scheiner then received a Division I scholarship and transferred to the University of Houston to play for the Houston Cougars, as he majored in psychology. In 2017 in 63 games, Scheiner slashed .346 (fourth in the American Athletic Conference)/.432(fourth)/.667(leading the conference) in 243 at-bats with 50 runs (second), 18 doubles (third), three triples (sixth), and 18 home runs, 64 RBIs, and 12 hit by pitch—all leading the conference, while playing shortstop, third base, and second base. He was named American Athletic Conference Co-Player of the Year, and was a consensus All-American.

== Professional career ==
=== Philadelphia Phillies ===
Scheiner was selected by the Philadelphia Phillies in the fourth round of the 2017 Major League Baseball draft. He signed with the Phillies, and was assigned to the Williamsport Crosscutters of the Low–A New York–Penn League, where in 2017 he batted .250 with 14 doubles (ninth in the league), four home runs, 19 RBI, and seven hit by pitch (third) in 236 at-bats over 61 games.

In 2018, Scheiner played for the Lakewood BlueClaws of the Single–A South Atlantic League. He hit .296/.372 in 463 at-bats with 30 doubles (fifth in the league), five triples (seventh), 13 home runs, 67 RBI (sixth), and 49 walks (fifth) in 122 games, and was named a South Atlantic League Mid-Season All-Star and Post-season All Star. He began 2019 with the Clearwater Threshers of the High–A Florida State League.

=== Seattle Mariners ===
On June 2, 2019, the Phillies traded Scheiner to the Seattle Mariners in exchange for outfielder Jay Bruce and cash considerations. He was assigned to the Modesto Nuts of the High–A California League, with whom he finished the season. Over 119 games between Clearwater and Modesto, Scheiner slashed .266/.325/.451 with 16 home runs and 83 RBI. His .504 slugging percentage with Modesto was 9th in the league.

Scheiner did not play a minor league game in 2020 due to the cancellation of the minor league season caused by the COVID-19 pandemic. For the 2021 season he was assigned to the Arkansas Travelers of the Double-A Central, where he slashed .253/.343/.456 with 74 runs (second in the league), 20 doubles (eiegth), 18 home runs (seventh), 60 RBI (tenth), 47 walks (ninth), and nine hit by pitch (ninth), while leading the league with 133 strikeouts. On May 23, 2021, he was named Texas League Player of the Week. In the field he played first base, third base, second base, right field, left field, and shortstop.

He returned to Arkansas for the 2022 season. Over 127 games and 477 at bats, Scheiner led the Texas League with 34 doubles and 105 RBI, and batted .252/.356/.455 with 21 home runs (seventh in the league), 73 walks (fourth), and 9 sacrifice flies (second). Defensively, he played first base, third base, and left field.

Scheiner played the 2023 season with the Triple–A Tacoma Rainiers. In 124 games for Tacoma, he batted .252/.369/.509(7th in the Pacific Coast League) with career–highs in home runs (30; leading the league) and RBI (105; 2nd), with 91 runs (8th) and 81 walks (5th). He was named an MiLB.com Organization All Star. Scheiner elected free agency following the season on November 6, 2023. Through 2023, in the minor leagues he had played 216 games at first base, 233 games at third base, 82 games in left field, 49 games at second base, 15 games in right field, 5 games at shortstop, and one game in center field.

=== Hiroshima Toyo Carp ===
On November 16, 2023, Scheiner signed with the Hiroshima Toyo Carp of Nippon Professional Baseball. He played in 12 games for the Carp in 2024, slashing .133/.161/.267 with one home run and five RBI before injuring his injured his left wrist on July 31. On September 20, 2024, the Carp canceled Scheiner's contract.

On June 7, 2025, Scheiner announced his retirement from professional baseball via an Instagram post.

== Coaching career ==
On January 29, 2026, Scheiner was announced as the hitting coach for the Fredericksburg Nationals, the Single-A affiliate of the Washington Nationals.

== See also ==
- List of select Jewish baseball players
