= Rod Booker =

American baseball player (born 1958)

- Pinch hitter/Shortstop
- Born: September 4, 1958 (age 67); Los Angeles, California, U.S.
- Batted: Left Threw: Right

MLB debut
- April 29, 1987, for the St. Louis Cardinals

Last MLB appearance
- July 14, 1991, for the Philadelphia Phillies

MLB statistics
- Fielding percentage: .964
- Batting average: .248
- Assists: 159
- Stats at Baseball Reference

Teams
- St. Louis Cardinals (1987–1989); Philadelphia Phillies (1990–1991)

Roderick Stewart Booker (born September 4, 1958) is an American former professional baseball utility player, who played shortstop, second base, and third base. He attended Pasadena High School before spending five seasons in Major League Baseball (MLB) for the St. Louis Cardinals (1987–1989) and Philadelphia Phillies (1990–1991).
