= Pacific Empire League =

Collegiate summer baseball league

- Sport: Baseball
- Founded: 2023
- President: Natalie Norman, Esq.
- No. of teams: 6
- Countries: United States
- Most recent champion: Healdsburg Prune Packers (2025)
- Most titles: Healdsburg Prune Packers (2)
- Website: www.pacificempireleague.org

The Pacific Empire League is a collegiate summer baseball league based on the west coast of the United States with six teams from northern California and Oregon. The league was founded on December 13, 2023.

== History ==
=== The Beginning ===
On December 13, 2023, six long-standing collegiate summer baseball teams, the Healdsburg Prune Packers, Humboldt Crabs, Lincoln Potters, Medford Rogues, Solano Mudcats and West Coast Kings came together to form the new Pacific Empire League. Teams in the PEL play a 55-game regular season that culminates in a 3-game Championship Series. The league is designated as a 501(c)(3) nonprofit organization represented by Board Representatives from each member team.

== Current teams ==
Team	City	Stadium	Seating Capacity	Founded	Joined
Healdsburg Prune Packers	Healdsburg, CA	Recreation Park	1,000	2011	2024
Humboldt Crabs	Arcata, CA	Arcata Ball Park	2,000	1945	2024
Lincoln Potters	Lincoln, CA	McBean Stadium	1,595	2016	2024
Marysville Giants	Marysville, CA	Bryant Field	4,000	2024	2026
Solano Mudcats	Fairfield, CA	Solano Community College	314	1990	2024
West Coast Kings	Pleasant Hill, CA	Will C. Wood High School	~ 400	2012	2024

== Former teams ==
Team	City	Stadium	First season	Last season	Result
Medford Rogues	Medford, OR	Harry & David Field	2024	2026	joined Far Western Conference

== Yearly Standings ==
2024 Pacific Empire League baseball standings
	Conf.				Overall
Team	W		L	PCT	W		L	PCT
Healdsburg ‍†‍‡‍^{y}	22	–	5	.815	37	–	6	.860
Humboldt ‍‍‍	16	–	12	.571	33	–	17	.660
Lincoln ‍‍‍^{y}	15	–	12	.556	35	–	16	.686
Medford ‍‍‍	12	–	14	.462	27	–	20	.574
Solano ‍‍‍	10	–	15	.400	15	–	19	.441
West Coast ‍‍‍	5	–	20	.200	5	–	20	.200
† – Conference champion ‡ – Pacific Empire League champion y- Invited to the Pacific Empire League Playoffs; Rankings from YSN365

2025 Pacific Empire League baseball standings
	Conf.				Overall
Team	W		L	PCT	W		L	PCT
No. 1 Healdsburg ‍†‍‡‍^{y}	22	–	5	.815	38	–	6	.864
No. 6 Humboldt ‍‍‍^{y}	17	–	8	.680	40	–	10	.800
Lincoln ‍‍‍	18	–	9	.667	34	–	10	.773
West Coast ‍‍‍	7	–	17	.292	15	–	21	.417
Medford ‍‍‍	7	–	18	.280	29	–	24	.547
Solano ‍‍‍	5	–	21	.192	11	–	22	.333
† – Conference champion ‡ – Pacific Empire League champion y- Invited to the Pacific Empire League Playoffs; Rankings from YSN365

== 2024 Championship ==
Healdsburg won the series, 2-1.

Game	Date	Score	Location	Time	Attendance
1	July 30	Lincoln Potters – 13, Healdsburg Prune Packers – 12	McBean Stadium	6:35pm	N/A
2	August 1	Lincoln Potters – 3, Healdsburg Prune Packers - 5	Recreation Park	6:00pm	N/A
3	August 2	Lincoln Potters – 2, Healdsburg Prune Packers – 13	Recreation Park	6:00pm	N/A

== 2025 Championship ==
Healdsburg won the series, 2-1.

Game	Date	Score	Location	Time	Attendance
1	July 29	Healdsburg Prune Packers – 8, Humboldt Crabs – 10	Arcata Ball Park	7:00pm	N/A
2	July 31	Humboldt Crabs – 2 vs. Healdsburg Prune Packers – 10	Recreation Park	6:00pm	N/A
3	August 1	Humboldt Crabs – 4 vs. Healdsburg Prune Packers – 9	Recreation Park	6:00pm	N/A
