= Reggie Christiansen =

American baseball coach (born 1975)

Current position
- Title: Head coach
- Team: Sacramento State
- Conference: WAC
- Record: 458–388 (.541)

Biographical details
- Born: August 28, 1975 (age 51); Ferndale, California, U.S.

Playing career
- 1994–1995: College of the Redwoods
- 1996–1997: Menlo College
- Position: Third baseman

Coaching career (HC unless noted)
- 1998–1999: Menlo (asst.)
- 2001: Ferndale HS
- 2002: Menlo
- 2003–2004: Kansas (asst.)
- 2005–2008: South Dakota State
- 2009–2010: Sacramento State (asst.)
- 2011–present: Sacramento State

Head coaching record
- Overall: 554–501 (.525) (NCAA); 11–29 (.275) (NAIA)
- Tournaments: NCAA: 2–6

Accomplishments and honors

Championships
- 3× WAC regular season (2012, 2014, 2025); 3× WAC Tournament (2014, 2017, 2019)

Awards
- 3× WAC Coach of the Year (2012, 2014, 2025)

Reggie Aaron Christiansen (born August 28, 1975) is an American college baseball coach who has served as head coach of the Sacramento State Hornets baseball team since 2011. Christiansen was previously head coach at Menlo and South Dakota State. At Sacramento State, Christiansen has 400 wins, with two Western Athletic Conference Coach of the Year honors in 2012 and 2014 and three appearances in the NCAA tournament in 2014, 2017, and 2019. As of the 2023 season, Sacramento State has won 30+ games 11 consecutive years — the only Division I school in the state of California to accomplish that feat.

== Early life and education ==
Originally from Ferndale, California, Christiansen attended Menlo College, where he played on the Menlo Oaks baseball team at third base from 1996 to 1997. Christiansen graduated from Menlo College in 1998 with a bachelor's degree in business administration.

== Coaching career ==
=== Early coaching career (1998–2008) ===
After his playing career ended, Christiansen was assistant coach at Menlo College in 1998 and 1999. In the spring of 2001, Christiansen was head baseball coach at Ferndale High School. Hired on September 1, 2001, Christiansen returned to Menlo College as head coach, with an 11–29 record in the 2002 season.

In 2003 and 2004, Christiansen was as an assistant coach at Kansas, in which the Jayhawks set several program offensive records and led the Big 12 in batting in the 2004 season. He then served as head coach of the South Dakota State during its transition from Division II to Division I from 2005 to 2008.

=== Sacramento State assistant and head coach (2009–present) ===
From 2009 to 2010, Christiansen was an assistant at Sacramento State before being elevated to the top job beginning in 2011.

In 2012, Christiansen was the Western Athletic Conference (WAC) Coach of the Year for a turnaround season elevating Sacramento State from last place to regular season co-champions.

As of the 2023 season, Christiansen is 400–331 at Sacramento State with two regular season WAC titles (2012 and 2014), three WAC tournament titles (2014, 2017, and 2019), and three NCAA tournament appearances (2014, 2017, and 2019).

== Head coaching record ==
Record table
Season	Team	Overall	Conference	Standing	Postseason
Menlo Oaks (NCAA Division III independent) (2002)
2002	Menlo	11–29			
Menlo (NAIA):		11–29 (.275)			
South Dakota State Jackrabbits (NCAA Division I independent) (2005–2007)
2005	South Dakota State	17–38			
2006	South Dakota State	23–29			
2007	South Dakota State	34–19			
South Dakota State Jackrabbits (The Summit League) (2008)
2008	South Dakota State	22–27	9–11	5th	
South Dakota State:		96–113 (.459)	9–11 (.450)		
Sacramento State Hornets (Western Athletic Conference) (2011–present)
2011	Sacramento State	19–39	6–18	7th	
2012	Sacramento State	31–28	11–7	T–1st	
2013	Sacramento State	34–25	14–13	5th	
2014	Sacramento State	40–24	21–6	1st	NCAA Regional
2015	Sacramento State	33–27	16–11	T–4th	
2016	Sacramento State	30–28	16–11	4th	
2017	Sacramento State	32–29	12–12	4th	NCAA Regional
2018	Sacramento State	35–25	17–7	T–2nd	
2019	Sacramento State	40–25	18–9	T–4th	NCAA Regional
2020	Sacramento State	9–7	0–0		Season canceled due to COVID-19
2021	Sacramento State	35–22	22–14	3rd	
2022	Sacramento State	32–26	17–13	3rd (West)	
2023	Sacramento State	30–26	14–16	9th	
2024	Sacramento State	26–31	14–16	8th	WAC Tournament
2025	Sacramento State	32–26	15–9	T–1st	WAC Tournament
Sacramento State:		458–388 (.541)	213–162		
Total:		554–501 (.525)			
National champion Postseason invitational champion Conference regular season champion Conference regular season and conference tournament champion Division regular season champion Division regular season and conference tournament champion Conference tournament champion

== See also ==
- List of current NCAA Division I baseball coaches
