= Far West League (collegiate summer baseball league) =

- Sport: Baseball
- Founded: 2010
- Folded: 2013
- CEO: Erik Wagle
- No. of teams: 8 (as of 2012)
- Country: United States
- Last champion: Humboldt Crabs
- Website: web.archive.org/web/20130607152224/http://www.farwestleaguesummerbaseball.com/

The Far West League (FWL) was a collegiate summer baseball league based on the west coast of the United States that served primarily California and Oregon. It was formed as part of a merger between the West Coast League/Tri-State and Pacific West Baseball League, even though the PWBL is still in operation.

The FWL began play in 2011 with each team facing each of the other teams three times for 27 regular-season league games. Post-season play saw the top five teams in a nine-game double-elimination tournament with the Humboldt Crabs winning the 2011 championship.

== Teams in the FWL ==
Status	Team	City	Home field	Previous League	Manager/Head Coach	2011 FWL Record
Final FWL Teams	*Humboldt Crabs	Arcata, CA	Arcata Ball Park	WCL/TS	Matt Nutter / Robin Guiver	25 - 7
Final FWL Teams	Southern Oregon RiverDawgs	Medford, OR	Harry & David Field	WCL/TS	Chris Wolf	13 - 14
Final FWL Teams	Neptune Beach Pearl	Alameda, CA	College of Alameda		Brant Cummings	19 – 12
Final FWL Teams	Fontanetti's Athletics	San Jose, CA	San Jose Academy HS		Dan Luque / Jerry McClain	19 - 12
Final FWL Teams	Menlo Park Legends	Menlo Park, CA	Cañada College		David Klein	
Final FWL Teams	Nor Cal Longhorns	San Mateo, CA	Cañada College	SRL Stan Musial League	Lenny Vagt / Jeffrey Bowman	
Final FWL Teams	Walnut Creek Crawdads	Walnut Creek, CA	Saint Mary's College		Paul Hewitt	
Final FWL Teams	San Francisco Seals	San Francisco, CA	Laney College		Abel Alcantar	15 - 22
Former FWL (2011 season)	Redding Colt 45s	Redding, CA	Tiger Field	WCL/TS	Rick Bosetti / Dennis Brugman	13.5 – 15.5
Former FWL (2011 season)	Nevada Bullets	Reno, NV	Western Nevada College		Jim Blueberg	9 - 18
Former FWL (2011 season)	Nor Cal Pirates	Chico, CA	Butte College		Casey Dill	3 - 24
Former FWL (2011 season)	Atwater Aviators	Atwater, CA	Firemans Memorial Ballpark	PWBL	Richard Ruiz / Rollo Adams	21.5 – 8.5
Former FWL (2011 season)	California Glory	Lodi, CA	Tony Zupo Field	PWBL	Ron Bindell	11 - 16
Former FWL (2011 season)	Fresno Cardinals	Fresno, CA	John Euless Ballpark, Fresno City College	PWBL	Orlando Gomez / Kenny Crew	10 - 17
Former/Hiatus
Former/Hiatus	Folsom Pioneers	Folsom, CA	Folsom High School	WCL/TS	Mike Carter	
Former/Hiatus	Nevada Bighorns	Carson City, NV	Western Nevada College’s John L. Harvey field and Carson High School	WCL/TS	Dennis Young	

* = Denotes 2011 FWL Champion
