= Roseville Diamonds =

Roseville Dimonds
- 1948; Roseville, California

Minor league affiliations
- Previous classes: Class D
- League: Far West League

Major league affiliations
- Previous teams: New York Giants (1948)

Minor league titles
- League titles: None

Team data
- Previous parks: Maidu Park

The Roseville Diamonds were a short lived minor league baseball team based in Roseville, California, For a portion of the 1948 season, the Diamonds played the ending portion of the season as members of the Class D level Far West League, after the Pittsburg Diamonds relocated to Roseville on July 30, 1948. Roseville hosted home minor league games at Maidu Park. The Diamonds were a minor league affiliate of the New York Giants and the team finished in last place during its only season of play. Roseville hosted home minor league games at Maidu Park.

== History ==
Roseville first explored hosting minor league baseball in 1947, when Cleveland Indians scout Tony Governor toured Roseville as a potential site for hosting a minor league team in the Far West League League. During his visit, Governor met the Roseville Lions Club and stated that the local high school stadium would be adequate to host a team, but would need significant upgrades. Roseville was interested in a Far West League team, but Vallejo, California committed $25,000 to upgrade its ballpark and received a franchise before Roseville could commit to funding.

Local business and civic leaders met at the Roseville Athletic Club and agreed to formulate a plan for a new baseball facility in preparation for the 1948 season. Baseball executive and owner, Art Hadler, who had recently owned a team the Sacramento Winter League, addressed the Roseville Exchange Club and vowed to pursue a Far West League franchise for Roseville if the city would commit to a new ballpark.

In December 1947, the Boston Red Sox secured the Far West League's final franchise, with the choice of their affiliate location narrowed to either Oroville, California or Roseville. As Oroville already boasted a finished facility, at a league meeting held on Dec 22, 1948, Oroville was chosen over Roseville.

During the 1948 season, after Art Hadler had purchased the Pittsburg Diamonds franchise, he relocated the team to Roseville during the season. While Hadler campaigned for a permanent facility, the Roseville Diamonds began play at Roseville High School's all-dirt field. The ballpark was constructed in 1934 as a Works Progress Administration project, with the land donated by rancher William Kaseberg. Local contractor John Pitches was hired to expand seating at the facility in preparation of the Diamonds' arrival, with four days available for renovations and Hadler assisting in the renovations.

The Roseville Diamonds began play in the eight team, Class D level Far West League during the season. The league began play on April 30, 1948, with the Klamath Falls Gems, Marysville Braves, Medford Dodgers, Oroville Red Sox, Pittsburg Diamonds, Redding Browns, Santa Rosa Pirates and Willows Cardinals as members. On July 30, 1948, the Pittsburg Diamonds moved to Roseville with a record of 31–48.

On July 31, 1948, the Roseville Diamonds played their first game under their new name, losing at Oroville and losing again the next day. Traveling to Redding, the Diamond lost three more games to the Browns before sweeping a doubleheader. Coming to Roseville for their first home games, the Diamonds were in last place with a record of 33–53, with a 2–5 record based in Roseville. The team played eleven games over the next nine days in Roseville, beginning on August 5, 1948, against the Santa Rosa Pirates.

In their first home game, with one thousand fans in attendance, Santa Rosa's Bill LaThorpe threw a no-hitter and struck out seventeen batters in defeating Roseville. In their second home game, Roseville lost 16–6.

After losing their first five home games, Roseville had a 12–0 victory in the nightcap of a doubleheader on August 8, 1948, before losing their next six games.

With their current ballpark posing challenges of a dirt infield and alcohol not being allowed to be sold on the high school grounds, Hadler had to pay a fine to the league for utilizing a field lacking sod. On August 19, 1948, After losing to Medford, 5–3, Hadler announced the team would not play the remainder of its home schedule in Roseville and the Diamonds played the remainder of the season as a road team. The team suffered, winning only four of their final twenty-one games, including, a six-game sweep to the Willows Cardinals, to end the season.

The Diamonds ended the season with an overall record of 38-71 and finished in last place. The team compiled a record of 7-23 while based in Roseville and were managed by Gus Suhr, Rosie Rose and Bill Shewey, while finishing 24½ games behind the first place Oroville Red Sox in the final standings.

Roseville did not return to the 1949 Far West League, as Pittsburg reformed and Hadler sold the team to investors in Santa Rosa, California, who relocated the franchise to that city. The Far West League, playing its second season. had the Klamath Falls Gems, Marysville Braves, Medford Nuggets, Pittsburg Diamonds, Redding Browns, Santa Rosa Pirates, Vallejo Chiefs and Willows Cardinals as members. The Vallejo franchise replaced the Oroville Red Sox in league play, Pittsburg reformed, and Roseville moved to Santa Rosa.

Roseville has not hosted another minor league team.

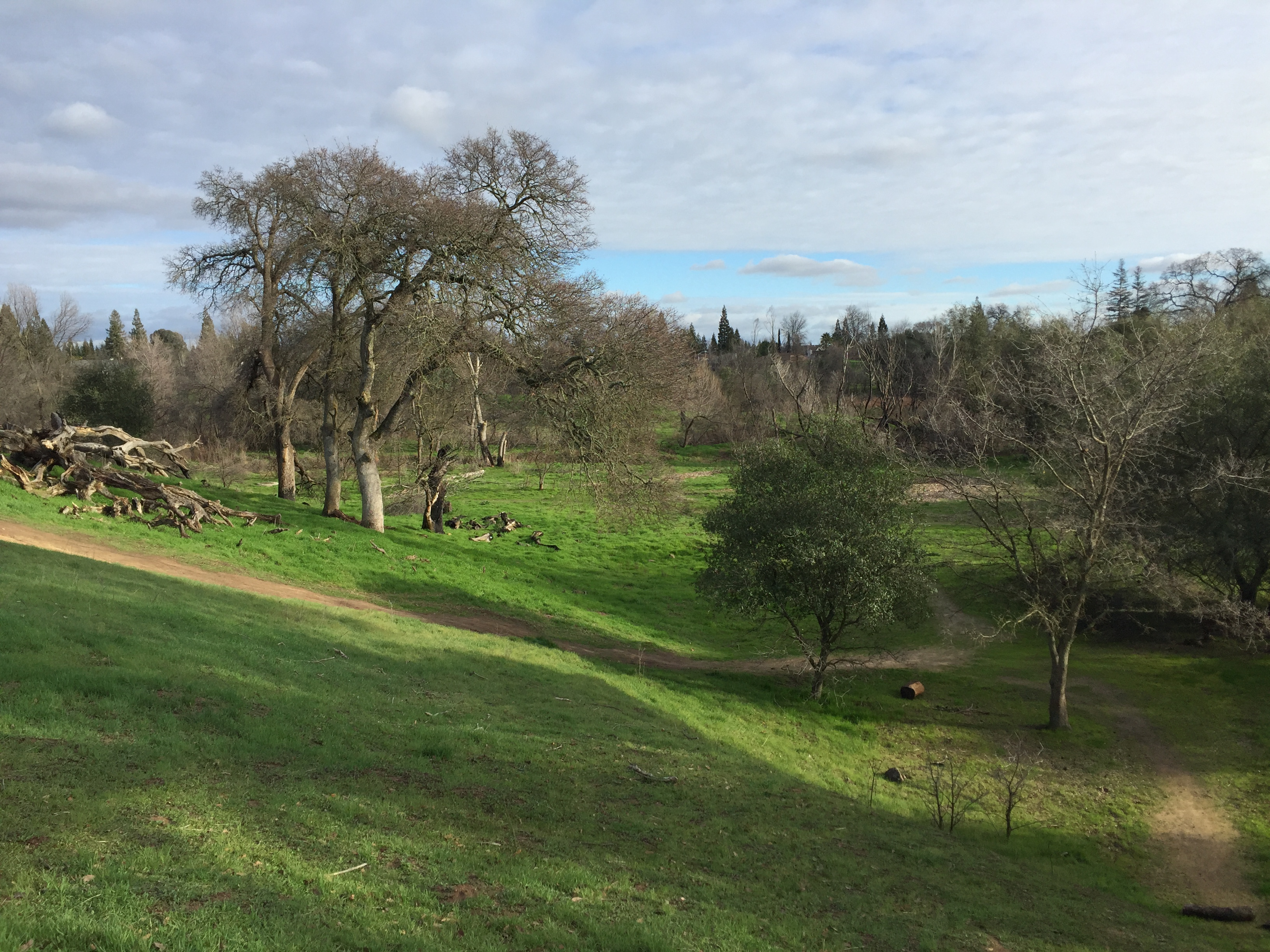
(2016) Within Maidu Regional Park. Roseville, California.

== The ballpark ==
The Roseville Diamonds hosted their home minor league home games at Maidu Park. The ballpark was the home field of the Roseville High School baseball team and had a dirt field, with lighting. The ballpark was constructed in 1934 as a Works Progress Administration project on land that was donated by William Kaseberg. Today, Maidu Regional Park is still in use as a public park with ballfields and amenities on 152 acres. It is located at Rocky Ridge Drive and Johnson Ranch Drive in Roseville.

== Year-by-year record ==
Year	Record	Finish	Manager	Attendance	Playoffs
1949	38–71	8th	Gus Suhr / Rosie Rose; Bill Shewey	11,504	Pittsburg (31–48) moved to Roseville July 30

== Notable alumni ==
- Gus Suhr
