= Vallejo Chiefs =

- 1949; Vallejo, California

Minor league affiliations
- Class: Class D (1949)
- League: Far West League (1949)

Major league affiliations
- Team: None (1949)

Minor league titles
- League titles (0): None
- Wild card berths (0): None

Team data
- Name: Vallejo Chiefs (1949)
- Ballpark: A.F. of L. Park (1949)

The Vallejo Chiefs were a short lived minor league baseball team based in Vallejo, California in the 1949 season. Hosting home games at A.F. of L. Park, the Chiefs played exclusively as members of the Class D level Far West League, before folding during their one season of play.

== History ==
After Vallejo, California first hosted minor league baseball in 1892, the Vallejo Chiefs were immediately preceded by the 1913 Vallejo Marines of the California State League.

The Vallejo Chiefs began minor league baseball play in 1949 as members of the eight–team Class D level Far West League, playing its second season. Joining Vallejo in 1949 league play were the Klamath Falls Gems, Marysville Braves, Medford Nuggets, Pittsburg Diamonds, Redding Browns, Santa Rosa Pirates and Willows Cardinals. The Vallejo franchise replaced the Oroville Red Sox in league play.

Beginning play in the Far West League on April 29, 1949, the Vallejo Chiefs folded during the season. The Chiefs franchise permanently folded on July 31, 1949. At the time they folded, the Chiefs had compiled a 34–58 record, playing under manager Lou Vezilich. The franchise had total home attendance of 5,999 at the time they folded.

Vallejo folded from minor league play following the 1949 season, as the Far West League continued play through their final season of 1951. The 2013 Vallejo Admirals returned minor league play to Vallejo, playing as members of the Pacific Association.

== The ballpark ==
The Vallejo Chiefs played minor league home games at A.F. of L. Park. The ballpark was located on Napa Street between Mississippi Street and Nebraska Street. A.F. of L. Park no longer exists, the site today is residential.

== Year-by-year record ==
Year	Record	Finish	Manager	Attendance	Playoffs/Notes
1949	34–58	NA	Lou Vezilich	5,999	Team folded July 31
