= Salina Blue Jays =

- 1946–1952; (1922–1926, 1938–1941, 1946–1952); Salina, Kansas

Minor league affiliations
- Class: Class C (1922–1923); Class D (1924–1926); Class C (1938–1941, 1946–1952)
- League: Southwestern League (1922–1926); Western Association (1938–1941, 1946–1952)

Major league affiliations
- Team: Cleveland Indians (1941); Philadelphia Phillies (1946–1952)

Minor league titles
- League titles (1): 1926
- Conference titles (2): 1925; 1947

Team data
- Name: Salina Millers (1922–1926, 1938–1941); Salina Blue Jays (1946–1952)
- Ballpark: Oakdale Park (1922–1926); Kenwood Field (1938–1952)

The Salina Blue Jays were a minor league baseball team based in Salina, Kansas. The Salina Blue Jays and their immediate predecessor, the Salina "Millers" played as members of the Southwestern League (1922–1926) and Western Association (1938–1941, 1946–1952), winning the 1926 league championship and two league pennants. The Salina Millers were a minor league affiliate of the Cleveland Indians in 1941 and the Blue Jays were a Philadelphia Phillies affiliate from 1946 to 1952. Salina hosted home minor league games at Oakdale Park from 1922 to 1926 and Kenwood Field from 1938 to 1952. The 1922 Salina Millers team was preceded by the 1914 Salina Coyotes of the Kansas State League.

== History ==
=== Salina Millers 1922 to 1926 / 1938 to 1941 ===
The Salina Millers were preceded by the 1914 Salina Coyotes, who played their final season as members of the four–team, Class D level Kansas State League.

After the 1922 Coyotes folded, Salina was without a minor league team until the Salina Millers joined the 1922 Class C level Southwestern League. The 1922 Salina Millers finished last in their first season of play. Managed by John McCloskey and Chester Olson, the Millers ended the season in eighth place in the eight–team league with a 45–88 record. The Millers were 37.0 games behind the first place Muskogee Mets in the final standings.

The Salina Millers placed sixth with a 60–72 record in the 1923 Southwestern League under manager Benny Meyer. D. Walker led the league with 200 strikeouts.

In 1924, Salina placed second in the league with a 72–56 final record.

The 1925 Salina Millers captured the Southwestern League pennant. The Millers finished with a 73–55 record, placing first in the Southwestern League regular season. In the Finals, the Topeka Senators defeated the Salina Millers four games to one. Jim Payton was the Salina manager. Pitcher Joe Bloomer of Salina led the league with 21 wins.

The Salina Millers won the 1926 Southwestern League pennant and championship in the final season for the league. Playing the season under returning manager Jim Payton, the Salina Millers finished with a record of 76–41, placing first in the regular season standings. In the Finals, the Salina Millers defeated the Enid Boosters three games to one to claim the championship. The Southwestern League permanently folded after the season. Salina's Bill Diester led the Southwestern League with a .444 batting average, 110 runs scored and 190 total hits. Teammate Dick Wykoff led the league with 28 home runs as a hitter and 25 wins as a pitcher.

In 1938, the Salina Millers resumed minor league play, as the team joined the Western Association, which was expanding from six–teams to eight–teams.

The Salina Millers finished in the lower division of the Western Association, playing in the league from 1938 to 1941. The Millers finished eighth (47–87) under manager Harry Suter, seventh (55–79) under Riley Parker and sixth (60–75) in their first three seasons of playing in the Western Association. In 1941, Salina became an affiliate of the Cleveland Indians and finished seventh at 46–88 under manager Red Rollings. After the 1941 season, the Carthage Browns and the Salina Millers franchises both folded, as the Western Association reduced to a six–team league in 1942.

=== Salina Blue Jays 1946 to 1952 ===
Salina resumed Western Association play in 1946, when the newly named Salina Blue Jays rejoined the eight–team Class C level league, which was reforming after a hiatus during World War II. Playing as an affiliate of the Philadelphia Phillies, Salina would remain both as a Phillies affiliate and a Western Association member through 1951. Salina joined the Fort Smith Giants, Hutchinson Cubs, Joplin Miners, Leavenworth Braves, Muskogee Reds, St. Joseph Cardinals and Topeka Owls teams in the reformed 1946 Western League.

In the 1946 season, playing as an affiliate of the Philadelphia Phillies, the Blue Jays finished last in the standings. Salina finished with a 51–77 record, placing eighth in the Western Association regular season standings. The manager was Edwin Ralls, as Salina finished 22.5 games behind the first place Leavenworth Braves. Hosting home games at Kenwood Field, Salina home season attendance was 44,050, an average of 688 per home game. Pitcher William Washburn of Salina led the league with 240 strikeouts.

The Salina Blue Jays won the 1947 Western Association pennant. The Blue Jays placed first in the regular season with a record of 85–53, as Edwin Ralls returned as manager. Salina finished 2.0 games in front of the second place Topeka Owls. In the first round of the playoffs, the Muskogee Reds defeated the Salina three games to two. The 1947 home attendance was 60,369, an average of 875 per home game.

Under manager Vance Dinges, the 1948 Blue Jays placed seventh in the Western Association, with a 58–80 regular season record. Salina drew 41,850 for the season and did not qualify for the postseason playoffs.

The 1949 Salina Blue Jays finished with a 69–69 overall record with manager Joe Gantenbein, ending 27.0 games behind the first place St. Joseph Cardinals. The Blue Jays placed sixth in the Western Association regular season standings, as Salina had season attendance of 50,145. The Blue Jays did not qualify for the playoffs.

Salina continued as a Philadelphia Phillies affiliate in 1950 and finished last in the Western Association. Playing the season under manager John Davenport, Salina finished with a 53–83 overall record to place eighth in the 1950 Western Association standings, finishing 37.0 games behind the first place Joplin Miners, who had Mickey Mantle on their roster. The 1950 season home attendance was 44,773, an average of 658 per home game.

In 1951, the Salina Blue Jays placed fourth in the Western Association regular season standings. With a record of 63–58, the Blue Jays finished 12.5 games behind the first place Topeka Owls, as the post season was cancelled due to flooding. Salina was managed by Pat Patterson. The Blue Jays had home season attendance of 47,550.

The 1952 season was the final season for the Salina Blue Jays. The 1952 Blue Jays finished with a record of 61–77, as Pat Patterson returned as manager, placing fifth in the Western Association regular season and finishing 22.5 games behind the first place Joplin Miners. Their season attendance of 35,984 was last in the league. Actor and game show host Bert Convy played for the 1952 Blue Jays. The Salina Blue Jays folded after the 1952 season and were replaced in the 1953 Western Association by the St. Joseph Cardinals.

After the Blue Jays folded in 1952, Salina did not host another minor league team until the 2016 Salina Stockade began play as members of the Independent level Pecos League.

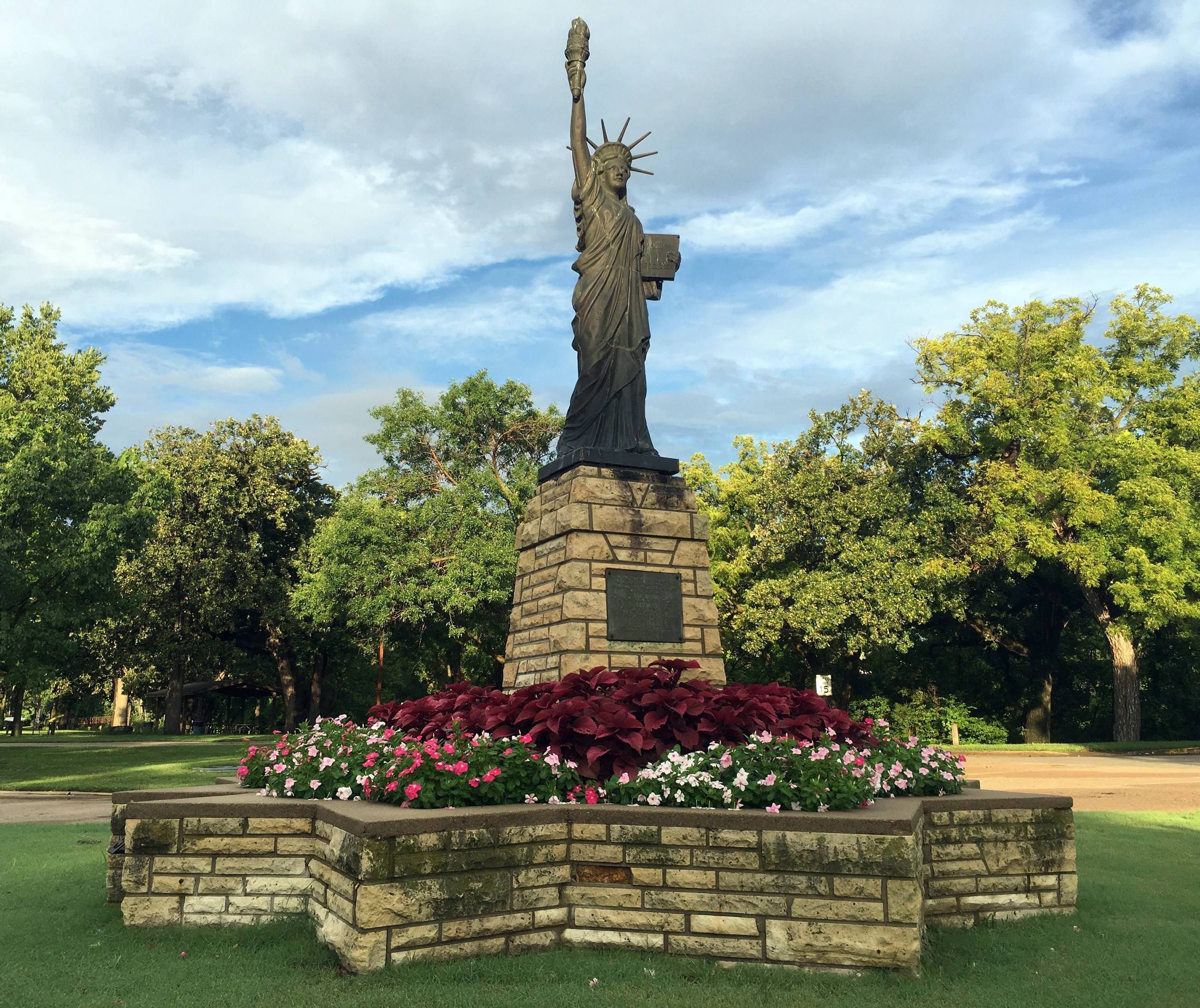
(2016) Statue of Liberty replica. Oakdale Park, Salina, Kansas.

== The ballparks ==
The Salina Millers first played minor league home games at Oakdale Park in the baseball seasons from 1922 to 1926. The ballpark site is located near its successor, Kenwood Field. Still in use today as a public park, Oakdale Park is located at 730 Oakdale Drive, Salina, Kansas.

Beginning in 1938, the Salina Millers and Blue Jays minor league teams hosted home games at Kenwood Field through 1952. The ballpark was noted to have had a capacity of 3,500 in 1938, 2,100 in 1939 and 2,200 in 1950. The field dimensions were (Left, Center, Right) 360–380–360. Kenwood Park is still in use as a public park, located at 821 Kenwood Park Drive, Salina, Kansas.

== Timeline ==
Year(s)	# Yrs.	Team	Level	League	Affiliate	Ballpark
1922–1923	2	Salina Millers	Class C	Southwestern League	None	Oakdale Park
1924–1926	3	Salina Millers	Class D	Southwestern League	None	Oakdale Park
1938–1940	3	Salina Millers	Class C	Western Association	None	Kenwood Field
1941	1	Salina Millers	Class C	Western Association	Cleveland Indians	Kenwood Field
1946–1952	7	Salina Blue Jays	Class C	Western Association	Philadelphia Phillies	Kenwood Field

== Year–by–year records ==
Year	Record	Finish	Manager	Playoffs
1922	45–88	8th	John McCloskey / Charles Olson	Did not qualify
1923	60–72	6th	Benny Meyer	Did not qualify
1924	72–56	2nd	Floyd Dorland	Did not qualify
1925	72–55	1st	Jimmy Payton	League pennant Lost League Finals
1926	76–41	1st	Jimmy Payton	League champions
1938	47–87	8th	Harry Sutter / Jack Calvey	Did not qualify
1939	55–79	7th	Riley Parker	Did not qualify
1940	60–75	6th	Jack Calvey	Did not qualify
1941	46–88	7th	Red Rollings / Jimmy Payton / John Fitzpatrick	Did not qualify
1946	51–77	8th	Edwin Walls	Did not qualify
1947	85–53	1st	Edwin Walls	League pennant Lost in 1st round
1948	58–80	7th	Vance Dinges	Did not qualify
1949	69–69	6th	Joe Gantenbein	Did not qualify
1950	53–83	8th	John Davenport	Did not qualify
1951	63–58	4th	Floyd Patterson	No playoffs held due to flooding
1952	61–77	5th	Floyd Patterson	Did not qualify

== Notable alumni ==
- Bill Bagwell (1922)
- Walter Brown (1941)
- Bubba Church (1947)
- Jim Command (1947–1948)
- Bert Convy (1952) Actor
- Otis Delaporte (1941)
- George Darrow (1926)
- Vance Dinges (1948, MGR)
- Joe Dugan (1946)
- John Fitzpatrick (1941, MGR)
- Liz Funk (1939)
- Joe Gantenbein (1949, MGR)
- Paul Gillespie (1941)
- Sheldon Jones (1941)
- Doyle Lade (1941)
- Eddie Lopat (1941) MLB All-Star
- Del Lundgren (1922–1923)
- John McCloskey (1922, MGR)
- Benny Meyer (1923, MGR)
- Tommy Nelson (1939)
- Jack Radtke (1938)
- Billy Rogell (1924)
- Red Rollings (1941, MGR)
- Danny Schell (1949)
- Gene Snyder (1951)
- Elmer Stricklett (1898)
- Paul Stuffel (1947)
- Lee Tate (1952)
- Wiley Taylor (1923)
- Bill Walker (1923) MLB All-Star
- Elmer Weingartner (1941)
- Ed Wheeler (1940)

== See also ==
- Salina Blue Jays players
- Salina Millers players

== External references ==
- Salina - Baseball Reference
