= Bob Clear =

- Coach
- Born: December 14, 1927; Denver, Colorado, U.S.
- Died: April 6, 2010 (aged 82); Carson, California, U.S.
- Batted: Right Threw: Right

Teams
- California Angels (1976–1987)

Elwood Robert Clear (December 14, 1927 – April 6, 2010) was an American minor league baseball infielder, pitcher and manager, and a Major League coach with the California Angels. He was born in Denver, Colorado, and moved to Los Angeles with his family in 1940. During his active career, Clear batted and threw right-handed and was listed as 5 feet 9 inches (1.75 m) tall and 170 pounds (77 kg). He was the uncle of former MLB relief pitcher Mark Clear.

== Playing career ==
Clear began a long playing career with the 1945 Batavia Clippers of the Class D Pennsylvania–Ontario–New York League (PONY League), hitting .222 at age 17. He returned to California as a member of the Class C Bakersfield Indians in 1946, playing third base and only posting an .838 fielding percentage while batting .266. The next year, he joined the St. Louis Cardinals' minor-league organization and hit .200 for Lynchburg and .208 for the Decatur, both in Class B leagues.

Clear then attempted a pitching career. He posted a 17–12 record with a 3.45 ERA for the 1948 Willows Cardinals in the Class D Far West League; he was second in the league in games won to Larry Shepard of Medford, a future colleague as a manager in the Pittsburgh Pirates' farm system of the 1960s. He also was 0–1 with Class C Fresno of the California League.

Clear spent most of 1949 with the Pocatello Cardinals (11–6, 5.84) and also was back in Lynchburg for one loss. By his 21st birthday, he had been with seven teams. The 1950 season brought him to the Class A Western League and he went 16–7 with a 3.38 ERA. He was tied for fourth in the circuit in wins, was fourth with 119 walks and the Omaha Cardinals pitcher led the league with four shutouts. He struggled with the Cardinals' three top minor league affiliates in 1951, going 1–2, 8.13 for the Houston Buffaloes, 0–4 with a 9.82 ERA for the Columbus Red Birds and 0–1 for the Rochester Red Wings. After playing on 11 teams by age 24, Clear's career then settled down. He went 9–12, with a 3.44 ERA for Houston in 1952 and 4–6, with a 3.35 ERA for the 1953 Buffaloes.

Back in Omaha in 1954, Clear went 20–11 with a 2.93 ERA, led the Western League in wins, was fifth in ERA, tied for second with 22 complete games, tied for third with five shutouts, first with 267 innings and first with 114 walks. In his 11th pro season, at age 27, he was invited to the big-league Cardinals' 1955 spring training camp, but he wasn't given the opportunity to pitch.

That season, Omaha joined the Triple-A American Association as one of the Cardinals' two top minor league affiliates. Staying with Omaha, but now competing in a higher classification, Clear fell to 1–10, with a 4.42 ERA. He began 1956 in Omaha, but after three games, he was assigned by the parent Cardinals to the Sioux City Soos of the Western League, where on May 15 he became a player-manager at age 27. On the mound, he went 5–4 with a 6.00 ERA for the Soos.

== Managing career ==
Clear finally left the Cardinals' chain in 1957, joining the Pirates as the player-manager of the Douglas Copper Kings of the Class C Arizona–Mexico League. He batted .313 and, on the mound, went 20–11 with a 3.63 ERA. He was second in the league in ERA behind Don Bruns, tied Candido Andrade for the win lead, and led with 28 complete games (in 31 starts). Still just 29 years old, he had now played for 13 clubs.

He won 18 of 26 decisions, with a 4.42 ERA, for Douglas in 1958, and helped make history on August 19 when he was hitting fifth for Douglas in a game in which all nine starters homered against the Chihuahua Dorados in a 22–6 rout. It was Clear's fourth 1958 home run as a hitter; he batted .303 that season and led the Copper Kings to the A–ML championship.

He went 13–8, with a 2.81 ERA for the Idaho Falls Russets the next year. He then had arguably his best year yet, going 21–6, with a 2.50 ERA for the Grand Forks Chiefs, leading the Northern League in wins and finishing in the top three in ERA. In 1961, he fell to 4–5, with a 5.05 ERA for Grand Forks. Retiring more or less from pitching, he appeared briefly for the 1965 Kinston Eagles and 1967 Clinton Pirates (1–0, 1.64), wrapping up his pitching career with a 144–117 record for 17 teams.

He continued to manage in the Pirates' farm system until 1969, making stops at Batavia in 1962, Gastonia in 1963–1964, Asheville in 1964, Kinston in 1965, back to Gastonia in 1966, Clinton in 1967–1968, and Geneva in 1969.

== With the California Angels ==
Clear moved to the California Angels' system in 1970, and would remain a member of the organization for the rest of his career. He managed the Idaho Falls Angels of the Rookie-level Pioneer League from 1970 to 1973, winning the league championship in his first season. Then he became a scout and minor-league instructor for 21/2 seasons, until July 1976, when he officially donned a Major League Baseball uniform for the first time as the Angels' bullpen coach under newly-named manager Norm Sherry. He held that role for the next 11 full seasons, through 1987, working under Sherry, Dave Garcia, Jim Fregosi, Gene Mauch and John McNamara. The Angels won three American League West Division championships (1979, 1982 and 1986) during his coaching tenure. In 1979 and 1980, he was joined on the Angels' roster by his nephew Mark, who worked out of Bob Clear's bullpen for his first two seasons in MLB before being traded to the Boston Red Sox.

After 1987, Clear continued in the Angel system as a special-assignments scout and instructor through 2000, his 56th year in professional baseball. He died in Carson, California, at the age of 82.
