= Far West League (1948–1951) =

- Most recent season or competition: 1951 Far West League season
- Classification: Class D (1948–1951)
- Sport: Baseball
- First season: 1948
- Folded: 1951
- President: Jerry Donovan (1948–1951)
- No. of teams: 11
- Country: United States of America
- Most titles: 1 Santa Rosa Pirates (1948); Pittsburg Diamonds (1949); Redding Browns (1950); Klamath Falls Gems (1951)

The Far West League was a minor league baseball league that operated from 1948 to 1951. The Far West League was a Class D level league, with franchises based in California, Nevada and Oregon. The Santa Rosa Pirates (1948), Pittsburg Diamonds (1949), Redding Browns (1950) and Klamath Falls Gems (1951) won league championships.

== History ==
The Far West League had eight teams in each of its first three seasons, before reducing to six teams in its final season of 1951. The league began play in 1948 with the Klamath Falls Gems, Marysville Braves, Medford Nuggets, Oroville Red Sox, Pittsburg Diamonds, Redding Browns, Santa Rosa Pirates and Willows Cardinals as the charter members.

In 1948, the Klamath Falls Gems were a Philadelphia Phillies affiliate; the Marysville Braves a Boston Braves affiliate; the Medford Nuggets, a Brooklyn Dodgers affiliate; the Oroville Red Sox, a Boston Red Sox affiliate; the Pittsburg Diamonds, a New York Giants affiliate; the Redding Browns, a St. Louis Browns affiliate; the Santa Rosa Pirates, a Pittsburgh Pirates affiliate and the Willows Cardinals were a St. Louis Cardinals affiliate.

The league held four–team playoffs from 1948 to 1950 and a two–team final in 1951. League championships were won by the Santa Rosa Pirates (1948), Pittsburg Diamonds (1949), Redding Browns (1950), and Klamath Falls Gems (1951).

The Far West League permanently folded following the conclusion of the 1951 season.

== Cities represented ==
- Chico, CA - Chico Red Sox (1949)
- Eugene, OR – Eugene Larks (1950–1951)
- Klamath Falls, OR – Klamath Falls Gems (1948–1951)
- Marysville, CA – Marysville Braves (1948–1949); Marysville Peaches (1950)
- Medford, OR – Medford Nuggets (1948–1949); Medford Rogues (1950–1951)
- Oroville, CA – Oroville Red Sox (1948)
- Pittsburg, CA – Pittsburg Diamonds (1948, 1949–1951)
- Redding, CA – Redding Browns (1948–1951)
- Reno, NV – Reno Silver Sox (1950–1951)
- Roseville, CA – Roseville Diamonds (1948)
- Santa Rosa, CA – Santa Rosa Pirates (1948); Santa Rosa Cats (1949)
- Vallejo, CA – Vallejo Chiefs (1949)
- Willows, CA – Willows Cardinals (1948–1950)

== Standings & statistics ==
1948 Far West League
schedule

| Team standings | W – L | GB | Managers |
|---|---|---|---|
| Oroville Red Sox | 67–51 | – | Nino Bongiovanni |
| Medford Nuggets | 66–56 | 3 | Larry Shepard |
| Klamath Falls Gems | 67–58 | 3½ | Joe Gantenbein |
| Santa Rosa Pirates | 63–59 | 6 | Dan Reagan |
| Willows Cardinals | 62–63 | 8 | James Tyack / Bill Krueger |
| Redding Browns | 61–62 | 8½ | Ray Perry |
| Marysville Braves | 59–63 | 10 | Edward Wheeler / James Keller / Spencer Harris |
| Pittsburg Diamonds / Roseville Diamonds | 38–71 | 24½ | Gus Suhr / Arnold Rose / Bill Shewey |

Pittsburg (31–48) moved to Roseville July 30
Playoffs: Klamath Falls 3 games, Oroville 1; Santa Rosa 3 games, Medford 1
Finals: Santa Rosa 4 games, Klamath Falls 3.

Player statistics
| Player | Team | Stat | Tot | Player | Team | Stat | Tot |
|---|---|---|---|---|---|---|---|
| Ray Perry | Redding | BA | .411 | Larry Shepard | Medford | W | 22 |
| Don Taylor | Medford | Runs | 139 | Jules Hudson | Oroville | SO | 237 |
| Ray Perry | Redding | Hits | 179 | Ronald Lee | Medford | ERA | 2.53 |
| Ray Perry | Redding | RBI | 163 | Larry Shepard | Medford | Pct | .880; 22–3 |
| Ray Perry | Redding | HR | 36 | | | | |

1949 Far West League

| Team standings | W – L | GB | Managers |
|---|---|---|---|
| Pittsburg Diamonds | 84–43 | – | Vince DiMaggio |
| Klamath Falls Gems | 78–46 | 4½ | Hub Kittle |
| Willows Cardinals | 68–58 | 15½ | Bert Bonomi / Fred Fass |
| Redding Browns | 63–64 | 21 | Ray Perry |
| Marysville Braves | 59–66 | 24 | Rex Carr |
| Medford Nuggets | 39–84 | 43 | Dan Reagan |
| Santa Rosa Cats | 43–49 | NA | Joe Abreu / Alvin Kruk / Lembert Serpa / Lou Vezilich |
| Vallejo Chiefs | 34–58 | NA | Lou Vezilich |

Vallejo disbanded July 31; Santa Rosa disbanded August 4.
Playoffs: Pittsburg 3 games, Willows 2; Redding 3 games, Klamath Falls 2
Finals: Pittsburg 4 games, Redding 3.

Player statistics
| Player | Team | Stat | Tot | Player | Team | Stat | Tot |
|---|---|---|---|---|---|---|---|
| Lou Vezilich | Vallejo/Santa Rosa | BA | .406 | William Carr | Pittsburg | W | 21 |
| Ray Perry; Ted Hess | Redding; Klamath Falls | Runs | 135; 135 | James Howard | Redding | SO | 226 |
| Ted Hess | Klamath Falls | Hits | 188 | William Carr | Pittsburg | ERA | 3.28 |
| Ray Perry | Redding | RBI | 155 | Blair Simpson | Pittsburg | Pct. | .882; 15–2 |
| Ray Perry | Redding | HR | 45 | | | | |

1950 Far West League
schedule

| Team standings | W – L | GB | Managers |
|---|---|---|---|
| Klamath Falls Gems | 87–52 | – | Hub Kittle |
| Redding Browns | 86–54 | 1½ | Ray Perry |
| Reno Silver Sox | 75–63 | 11½ | Joe Borich |
| Medford Rogues | 69–70 | 18 | Tommy Nelson / Wilfred Jonas |
| Pittsburg Diamonds | 67–73 | 20½ | Vince DiMaggio |
| Eugene Larks | 62–77 | 25 | Lou Vezilich |
| Marysville Peaches | 56–82 | 30½ | Bert Kenmuir / Charles Welchel |
| Willows Cardinals | 54–85 | 33 | Ray Malgradi |

Playoffs: Klamath Falls 3 games, Reno 2; Redding 3 games, Medford 0
Finals: Redding 3 games, Klamath Falls 1.

Player statistics
| Player | Team | Stat | Tot | Player | Team | Stat | Tot |
|---|---|---|---|---|---|---|---|
| Joe Borich | Reno | BA | .387 | Andy Sierra | Klamath Falls | W | 22 |
| Ray Perry | Redding | Runs | 162 | Andy Sierra | Klamath Falls | SO | 258 |
| George Triandos | Klamath Falls | Hits | 183 | Eugene Valentine | Pittsburg | ERA | 1.82 |
| Ray Perry | Redding | RBI | 170 | Hub Kittle | Klamath Falls | Pct | 1.000; 10–0 |
| Ray Perry | Redding | HR | 44 | | | | |

1951 Far West League
schedule
revised schedule after Pittsburg disbanded

| Team Standings | W – L | GB | Managers |
|---|---|---|---|
| Redding Browns | 76–55 | – | Ray Perry |
| Klamath Falls Gems | 74–54 | ½ | Bill DeCarlo |
| Reno Silver Sox | 52–65 | 17 | Cotton Pippen |
| Eugene Larks | 51–70 | 20 | Duster Mails / George Matile / Cliff Dapper |
| Medford Rogues | 47–67 | 20½ | Frank Lucchesi |
| Pittsburg Diamonds | 29–18 | NA | Vince DiMaggio |

Pittsburg disbanded June 14
Playoff Final: Klamath Falls 3 games, Redding 0
