= Willows Cardinals =

- 1948–1950; Willows, California

Minor league affiliations
- Class: Class D (1948–1950)
- League: Far West League (1948–1950)

Major league affiliations
- Team: St. Louis Cardinals (1948–1950)

Minor league titles
- League titles (0): None
- Wild card berths (1): 1949

Team data
- Name: Willows Cardinals (1948–1950)
- Ballpark: Ajax Field (1948–1950)

The Willows Cardinals were a minor league baseball team based in Willows, California. From 1948 to 1950, the Cardinals played as exclusively as members of the Class D level Far West League as a St. Louis Cardinals minor league affiliate. Willows hosted home minor league games at Ajax Field.

== History ==
Semi–professional level baseball in Willows began in 1900 with the Willows Giants.

In 1948, Willows sought to gain a minor league franchise, with the effort supported by local businessmen John Baker, Larry Cummins, Arno Poggi and others, who eventually helped secure a team to be based in Willows.

The Willows "Cardinals" began minor league baseball play in 1948 as charter members of the eight–team Class D level Far West League. The "Cardinals" moniker reflected the franchise playing an as affiliate of the St. Louis Cardinals. Joining Willows as charter members of the Far West League were the Klamath Falls Gems, Marysville Braves, Medford Dodgers, Oroville Red Sox, Pittsburg Diamonds, Redding Browns and Santa Rosa Pirates.

Beginning play in the 1948 Far West League, the Willows Cardinals placed fifth with a 62–63 record, playing the season under managers James Tyack and Bill Krueger. The Cardinals finished 8½ games behind the first place Oroville Red Sox in the final Far West League regular season standings. The team did not qualify for the playoffs.

Continuing to play in the 1949 Far West League season, Willows qualified for the playoffs. The 1949 Cardinals placed third as the league lost two teams during the season, completing the season playing as a six–team league. With a 68–68 record under managers Bert Bonomi and Fred Fass, the Cardinals finished 15.5 games behind the first place Pittsburg Diamonds in the final regular season standings. In the playoffs, eventual champion Pittsburg defeated Willows three games to two in the first round.

In their final season of play, the 1950 Willows Cardinals finished last eight–team Far West League. With a record of 54–85 under manager Ray Malgradi, Willows finished 33.0 games behind the first place Klamath Falls Gems, missing the playoffs.

Willows permanently folded from minor league play following the 1950 season, as the Far West League reduced to six teams in their final season of 1951.

== Ballpark ==
The Willows Cardinals hosted home minor league games at Ajax Field. The ballpark was located at North Culver Avenue & West Walnut Street in Willows, California. Ajax Field was named for Tom Ajax, a local businessman and long-time manager of the local Willows Giants team, who died in 1949. The ballpark grandstand was completely destroyed by fire in 1961.

== Timeline ==
Year(s)	# Yrs.	Team	Level	League	Affiliate	Ballpark
1948–1950	3	Willows Cardinals	Class D	Far West League	St. Louis Cardinals	Ajax Field

== Year–by–year records ==
Year	Record	Finish	Manager	Attendance	Playoffs
1948	62–63	5th	James Tyack / Bill Krueger	21,314	Did not qualify
1949	68–58	3rd	Bert Bonomi / Fred Fass	24,918	Lost 1st round
1950	54–85	8th	Ray Malgradi	17,128	Did not qualify

== Notable alumni ==
- Bob Clear (1948)
- Jim Tyack (1948, MGR)
- Willows Cardinals players
