= Vince DiMaggio =

American baseball player (1912–1986)

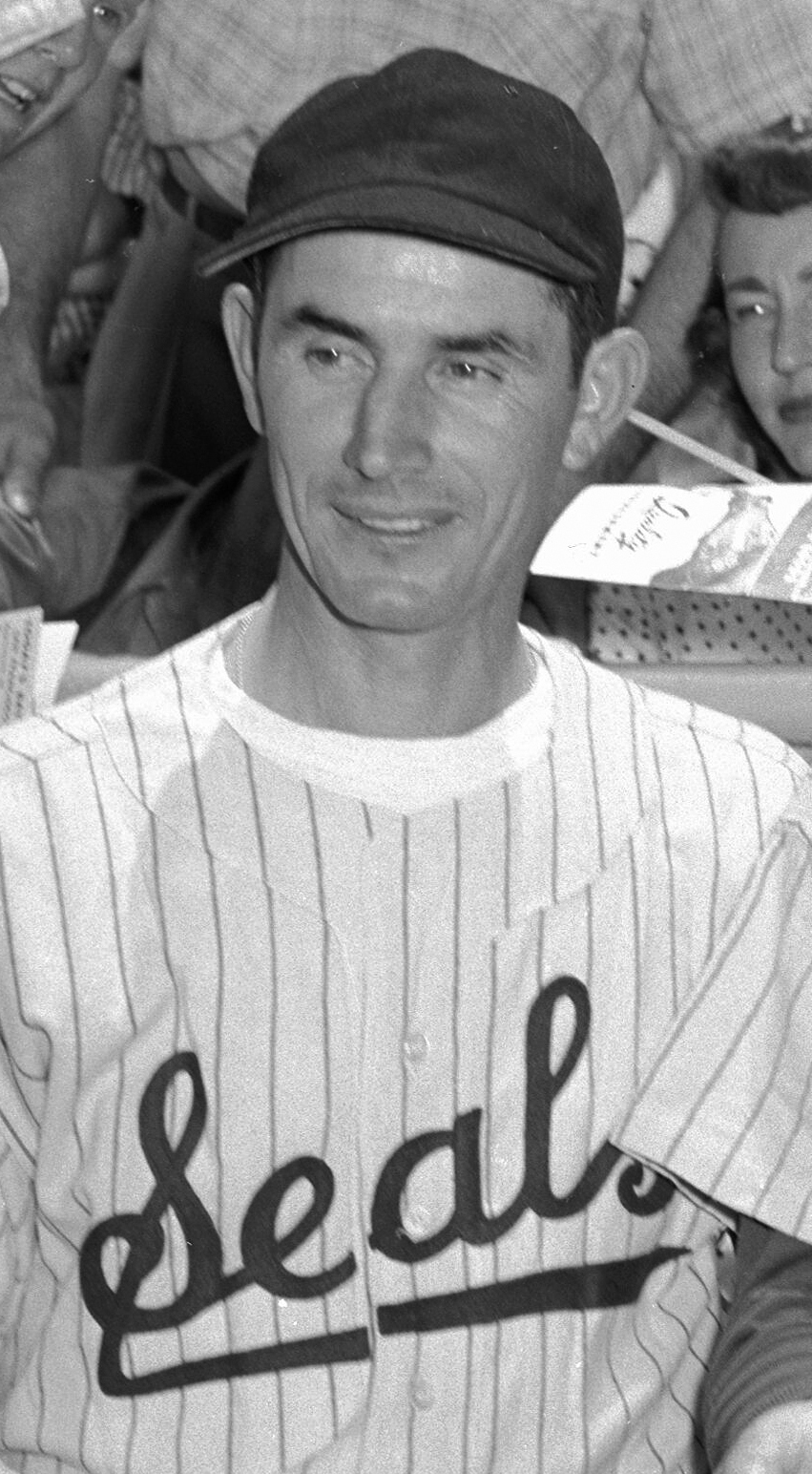
- DiMaggio in 1956
- Center fielder
- Born: September 6, 1912; Martinez, California, U.S.
- Died: October 3, 1986 (aged 74); North Hollywood, California, U.S.
- Batted: Right Threw: Right

MLB debut
- April 19, 1937, for the Boston Bees

Last MLB appearance
- June 6, 1946, for the New York Giants

MLB statistics
- Batting average: .249
- Home runs: 125
- Runs batted in: 584
- Stats at Baseball Reference

Teams
- Boston Bees (1937–1938); Cincinnati Reds (1939–1940); Pittsburgh Pirates (1940–1944); Philadelphia Phillies (1945–1946); New York Giants (1946)

Career highlights and awards
- 2× All-Star (1943, 1944)

Vincent Paul DiMaggio (September 6, 1912 – October 3, 1986) was an American Major League Baseball center fielder. During a 10-year baseball career, he played for the Boston Bees, Cincinnati Reds, Pittsburgh Pirates, Philadelphia Phillies, and New York Giants. DiMaggio was the older brother of Joe and Dom DiMaggio.

== Early life ==
DiMaggio was born in Martinez, California, and grew up in North Beach, San Francisco. Older than Joe and Dom, Vince was discovered first, and the teenage Joe used to enviously watch him play professional ball. Blessed with some power and good fielding, Vince once claimed that he could run rings around Joe in the outfield.

== Career ==
=== Minor leagues (1932–1936) ===
DiMaggio began his professional career in 1932 with the Tucson Lizards of the Class-D Arizona–Texas League, hitting .347 with 25 homers and 81 RBI. He led the Arizona–Texas League in home runs, with eight more than runner-up Cal Lahman. He played 94 games with the Lizards that year, finishing the season with the San Francisco Seals of the Class-AA Pacific Coast League. With the Seals, he hit .270 with 6 home runs in 59 games.

In 1933, DiMaggio hit .333 with 11 home runs and 65 runs batted in for San Francisco and the Hollywood Stars. He played with the Stars through 1935, joining the San Diego Padres in 1936.

=== Major League Baseball ===
On December 4, 1936, DiMaggio was traded by San Diego of the PCL to the Boston Bees for Tiny Chaplin, Tommy Thompson and cash. DiMaggio was a regular outfielder for the Bees in 1937 and 1938. In 1937, he hit .256 with a .311 on-base percentage and .387 slugging percentage with 13 home runs. In 1938, DiMaggio hit only .228/.313/.369, but led the Bees with 14 home runs on a team that hit 54 home runs in total. He was tenth in the National League (NL) in homers, sixth in steals (11) and eighth in walks (65). In both 1937 and 1938, he led the NL in strikeouts. His 134 strikeouts in 1938 set a NL record for most strikeouts in one season, breaking Gus Williams' record of 120 set in 1914.

On February 4, 1939, the Boston Bees sent DiMaggio to the New York Yankees to complete an earlier deal made on August 10, 1938, where the Bees sent players to be named later, Gil English, Johnny Riddle and cash to the Yankees for Eddie Miller. DiMaggio did not play for the Yankees, as they assigned him to their American Association affiliate, the Kansas City Blues.

On August 5, 1939, DiMaggio was traded by the Yankees to the Cincinnati Reds for players to be named later and $40,000. The Reds sent Frenchy Bordagaray and Nino Bongiovanni to the Yankees on January 27, 1940, to complete the trade. DiMaggio appeared in eight games with the 1939 Reds and only two games for the 1940 Reds before the Reds traded DiMaggio to the Pittsburgh Pirates for Johnny Rizzo on May 8, 1940.

DiMaggio spent the majority of his MLB career with the Pirates. In between, he was selected to the All-Star Game in 1943 and 1944. In the 1943 game, DiMaggio collected a home run, triple, single, a pair of runs and one RBI over three at-bats.

On March 31, 1945, he was traded by the Pirates to the Philadelphia Phillies for Al Gerheauser. He then hit four grand slams for the Phillies.

On May 1, 1946, he was traded by the Phillies to the New York Giants for Clyde Kluttz.

In his ten-year MLB career, DiMaggio batted .249 with 125 home runs and 584 RBI in 1110 games.

=== Return to the minors ===
DiMaggio played for the Oakland Oaks of the PCL in 1947. In 1948, he moved to the Stockton Ports of the California League as a player-manager. He also played for and managed the Pittsburg Diamonds of the Class-D Far West League from 1949 through 1951. He finished the 1951 season, and his professional career, with the Tacoma Tigers of the Class-B Western International League.

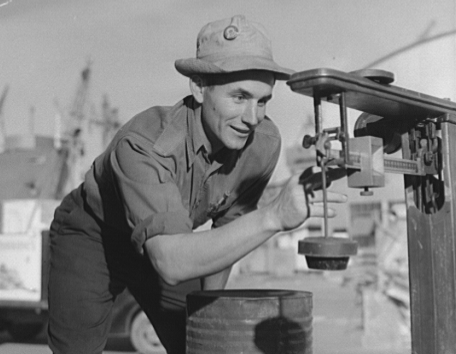
DiMaggio working for the California Shipbuilding Corporation during World War II

== Personal life ==
DiMaggio was married with two children, four grandchildren and two great-grandchildren. He died in North Hollywood, California, at age 74 of colon cancer.

DiMaggio worked at the California Shipbuilding Corporation during World War II. "He's one of the many former athletic stars who are helping to smash the Axis by building the equipment needed by America's fighting men," according to the Library of Congress.

According to Joe DiMaggio biographer Richard Ben Cramer, the iconic younger brother "didn't deal with Vince at all", never maintaining any meaningful relationship with him. But earlier in his career, DiMaggio had also joked that "If I could hit like Joe and he could talk like me, we'd make a helluva guy."
