= Eugene Larks =

Minor league baseball team in Eugene, Oregon (1950-1951)

- 1950–1951; Eugene, Oregon

Minor league affiliations
- Class: Class D (1950–1951)
- League: Far West League (1950–1951)

Major league affiliations
- Team: Unaffiliated (1950); Pittsburgh Pirates (1951)

Team data
- Name: Eugene Larks (1950–1951)
- Ballpark: Bethel Park (1950–1951)

The Eugene Larks were a class-D minor league baseball club, based in Eugene, Oregon for the 1950 and 1951 seasons. The team played in the Far West League and was an affiliate of the Pittsburgh Pirates in 1951. The Far West League disbanded after the 1951 season, and so did the Larks.

The team was named after the state bird of Oregon, the western meadowlark.

The Larks played in northwest Eugene in 4,000-seat Bethel Park, on the northwest corner of Roosevelt Boulevard and Maple Street (44.0644°N 123.1454°W). Its outfield is present-day Lark Park.

Eugene had previously been home to the 1904 Class-D Eugene Blues, who played in the Oregon State League. Eugene was without a team until 1955, when the Eugene Emeralds began play. In 2025, the Emeralds celebrated their 70th anniversary in Eugene, though the team plans to move after the 2025 season.

== Season-by-season ==
Year	Record	Finish	Manager	Playoffs
1950	62-77	6th	Lou Vezilich	Did not qualify
1951	51-70	4th	Duster Mails / George Matile; Cliff Dapper	Did not qualify
