= Medford Rogues =

Medford Rogues may refer to:

- Medford Rogues (collegiate wood bat baseball)
- Medford Rogues (Far West League), a defunct minor league baseball team
