= Fort Smith Giants =

- 1938–1949; (1938–1942, 1946–1949, 1951–1953); Fort Smith, Arkansas

Minor league affiliations
- Class: Class C (1938–1942, 1946–1949, 1951–1953)
- League: Western Association (1938–1942, 1946–1949, 1951–1953)

Major league affiliations
- Team: New York Giants (1938–1942, 1946–1949); Cleveland Indians (1951–1952)

Minor league titles
- League titles (1): 1942
- Conference titles (3): 1939; 1942; 1946
- Wild card berths (5): 1938; 1940; 1941; 1948; 1949

Team data
- Name: Fort Smith Giants (1938–1942, 1946–1949); Fort Smith Indians (1951–1952); Fort Smith-Van Buren Twins (1953)
- Ballpark: Andrews Field (1938–1942, 1946–1949, 1951–1953)

The Fort Smith Giants were a minor league baseball team based in Fort Smith, Arkansas. The Giants played as member of the Class C level Western Association from 1938 to 1942 and 1946 to 1949, winning the 1942 league championship and three league pennants. The Fort Smith Giants were a minor league affiliate of the New York Giants. In 1951 and 1952 Fort Smith became a Cleveland Indians affiliate and adopted their nickname. Fort Smith played a final Western Association season in 1953 as an unaffiliated team, known as the "Fort Smith-Van Buren Twins." The Fort Smith Western Association league teams all hosted home minor league games at Andrews Field.

Baseball Hall of Fame member Freddie Lindstrom managed the Giants in 1942, leading the team to the league championship.

== History ==
=== Western Association 1938 to 1942 ===
Minor league baseball began in Fort Smith in 1887, when the Fort Smith "Indians" played the season as members of the Southwestern League. In 1897, another Fort Smith Indians team was a member of the Arkansas State League. The Giants were preceded in minor league play by the 1932 Fort Smith Twins, who relocated during the season and ended a tenure of exclusive membership Western Association that began in 1911.

In the spring of 1936, the New York Giants were returning from spring training and played a game against the Cleveland Indians at Andrews Field in Fort Smith. After their first game, the Giants and the Indians played the game annually in Fort Smith through 1942. In 1938, knowing the ballpark, the New York Giants picked Fort Smith to be the location of an expansion team in the Western Association, The new affiliate team was accordingly nicknamed as the "Giants."

In the winter of 1938, the Western Association had announced it would be adding two teams to the league. Subsequently, Bill Terry the manager of the New York Giants (and a member of the Baseball Hall of Fame) visited Fort Smith to review recent renovations to Andrews Field. After Terry's visit to the city, the New York Giants proposed Fort Smith for readmittance to the Western Association as their affiliate and Fort Smith was admitted back into the league. The Salina Millers were the second expansion team added to the 1938 Western Association.

In 1938, the Fort Smith Giants resumed minor league play, as the team joined the Class C level Western Association, which was expanding from six–teams to eight–teams. The Bartlesville Chiefs, Hutchinson Larks (Pittsburgh Pirates affiliate), Joplin Miners (New York Yankees), Muskogee Reds (Cincinnati Reds), Ponca City Angels (Chicago Cubs), Salina Millers and Springfield Cardinals (St. Louis Cardinals) teams joined with Fort Smith in beginning league play on May 4, 1938.

In Fort Smith's return to the Western Association, the 1938 Fort Smith Giants finished in third place Western Association standings and qualified for the four-team playoffs. Playing the season under manager Frank Brazill, the Giants ended the regular season with a record of 74–65, finishing 10½ games behind the first place Ponca City Angels. In the playoffs, the Giants lost in the first round to eventual champion Ponca City 3 games to 2. The Giants' Glen Stewart led the Western Association in total hits, with 182. Pitcher Joe Luber led the Western Association with a 2.06 ERA.

The 1939 Fort Smith Giants won the Western Association pennant, before losing in the playoffs. The Giants ended the regular season with a record of 83–50 and in first place in the Western Association standings. Fort Smith finished 4.0 games ahead of the second place Joplin Miners in the eight-team Class C league, playing the season under manager Herschell Bobo, who began a three-year tenure as manager. The Giants lost in first round of the playoffs 3 games to 2 to eventual champion Springfield Cardinals.

Prior to his tenure as the Fort Smith Giants manager, Hershell Bobo was a collegiate coach. While serving as Athletic Director, Bobo coached three sports at Mississippi State Teachers College, now known as the University of Southern Mississippi. From 1924 to 1927 Bobo was the Mississippi State Teachers head football coach. Bobo was also the Mississippi State Teachers head basketball coach from 1924 to 1928 and the Mississippi State Teachers head baseball coach from 1925 to 1928.

Future major league player Harry Feldman pitched for Fort Smith in 1938 and 1939. After his baseball career ended, Feldman returned to Fort Smith and opened a record store, which he operated until his death in 1962 at the age of 42.

The Fort Smith Giants advanced to the 1940 Western Association finals. The Giants, continuing as a minor league affiliate of the New York Giants, ended the regular season in third place. With a record of 71–64 under manager Herschell Bobo, Fort Smith ended the season 16½ games behind the first place Muskogee Reds and qualified for the four-team playoffs. The Giants swept Muskogee in the first round of the playoffs in three games to advance. Fort Smith lost in finals to the St. Joseph Saints 3 games to 0.

In 1941, Fort Smith Giants again advanced to the Class C level Western Association finals. Ending the regular season with a record of 73–60, the Giants placed fourth in the eight-team league in their final season under returning manager Herschell Bobo. Fort Smith finished 19½ games behind the first place Joplin Miners and secured the final playoff position. Qualifying for the playoffs, the Giants defeated the Springfield Cardinals in the first round 3 games to 1. The Giants were defeated by Joplin in the finals, 3 games to 0.

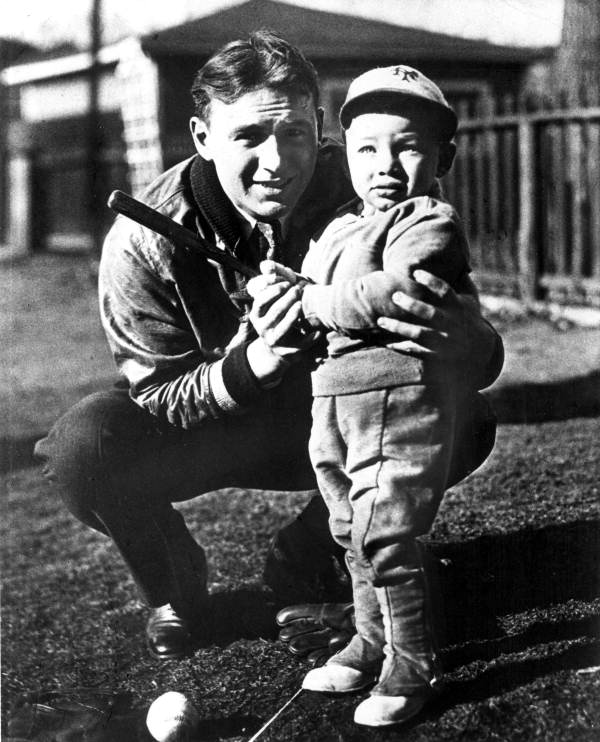
(1936) Baseball Hall of Famer Fred Lindstrom with his son Andy - Tallahassee, Florida

After the 1941 season, the Carthage Browns and the Salina Millers franchises both folded, as the Western Association reduced to a six–team league for the 1942 season. Herschell Bobo was replaced as manager by Baseball Hall of Fame member Freddie Lindstrom and the Fort Smith Giants won the Western Association championship. Lindstrom had been the manager of the Knoxville Smokies of the Southern Association, as the Smokies had two last-place finishes in 1940 and 1941, before Lindstrom joined the Fort Smith Giants.

En route to the 1942 Western Association championship, the Giants finished the Western Association regular season in third place overall. The Giants won the first half pennant as the league played a split season schedule. Overall, Fort Smith ended the season with a record of 68–63 finishing in third place. In the overall standings, Fort Smith ended the season 11.0 games behind the first place Topeka Owls, who won the second half of the split season schedule, setting up a meeting between the two teams in the final. Playing under manager Freddie Lindstrom, they won the 1942 league championship by defeating the Topeka Owls 4 games to 3. Mike Schemer of Fort Smith scored 125 runs to lead the Western Association. The league did not return to play in 1943, due to World War II

Freddie Lindstrom later became the coach of the Northwestern University baseball team, a position he held for eighteen years until he was appointed as the postmaster in Evanston, Illinois.

=== Western Association 1946 to 1949 ===
The Fort Smith Giants resumed Class C level Western Association play in 1946, as the league reformed as an eight–team league ending its hiatus during World War II. Remaining as an affiliate of the New York Giants, Fort Smith joined the Hutchinson Cubs (Chicago Cubs affiliate), Joplin Miners (New York Yankees), Leavenworth Braves (Boston Braves), Muskogee Reds (Cincinnati Reds), Salina Blue Jays (Philadelphia Phillies), St. Joseph Cardinals (St. Louis Cardinals) and Topeka Owls teams in the reformed 1946 Western League.

In the 1946 season, the Fort Smith Giants advanced to the Western Association playoff finals for the fourth consecutive season. The Giants won the first half pennant, qualifying for the final, as the league adopted a split-season schedule. Fort Smith ended the regular season with an overall record of 67–63 to finish in fifth place under player/manager Hugh Willingham. Fort Smith finished 7½ games behind the first place Leavenworth Braves, who didn't advance to the final. Fort Smith lost in the final to the second half pennant winner Hutchinson Cubs. The Cubs defeated the Giants 4 games to 2 in the final series.

The Fort Smith Giants placed seventh in the 1947 Western Association standings, missing the playoffs. The Giants ended the regular season with a 58–78 final record, playing the season under manager Earl Wolgamot. Fort Smith finished 25½ games behind the first place Salina Blue Jays in the final standings. The Giants did not qualify for the playoffs won by the St. Joseph Cardinals.

The Giants improved to finish in second place in the 1948 Western Association regular season, playing the season under manager Jack Aragon. With a record of 82–58, Fort Smith ended the season 9.0 games behind the first place St. Joseph Cardinals. In the playoffs, the Giants lost in first round 3 games to 1 to the Topeka Owls. Following the season, manager Jack Aragon became the manager of the Jacksonville Tars, of the Class A level South Atlantic League.

The 1949 season was the final one for Fort Smith under the "Giants" nickname, as the franchise played their final season as a New York Giants affiliate. The Giants finished in second place in the Western Association standings. Fort Smith compiled a record of 86–54, to finish in second place, playing the season under manager Harold Kollar. The Giants ended the regular season 11.0 games behind the first place St. Joseph Cardinals, who had Baseball Hall of Fame member Earl Weaver on their roster. In the four-team playoffs, Fort Smith lost 3 games to 0 to the eventual champion Joplin Miners. Harvey Gentry of Fort Smith scored 125 runs to lead the Western Association.

=== Western Association 1951 to 1953 ===
Fort Smith did not return to the league in 1950, as the Western Association continued play. The Enid Giants joined the league, replacing Fort Smith as the New York Giants' affiliate in the league, with Harold Kollar continuing as the Giants' manager in their new locale. The Joplin Miners, with Mickey Mantle won the league championship.

In 1951, the Fort Smith "Indians" returned to membership in the Western Association, as Fort Smith became a minor league affiliate of the Cleveland Indians. Fort Smith replaced the Springfield Cubs franchise in the league. The Indians finished last in the Western Association regular season standings. With a record of 43–80, Fort Wayne finished in eighth place in the eight-team league. Paul O'Dea was the Fort Smith manager, as the Indians finished 33½ games behind the first place Topeka Owls. The Western Association post season was cancelled due to flooding.

The 1952 season was the final season for Fort Smith as a Cleveland Indians affiliate. The team had a last place finish as the Western Association reduced to six teams. The 1952 Indians finished with a record of 69–77, as Harry Griswold served as manager, placing sixth in the six-team Western Association regular season. Fort Smith finished 26.0 games behind the first place Joplin Miners. The Indians did not qualify for the playoff won by Joplin.

After the Cleveland Indians affiliation ended following the 1952 season, the 1953 franchise continued Western Association play as an unaffiliated team. The team became known as the "Fort Smith-Van Buren Twins," in partnership with neighboring Van Buren, Arkansas. The Twins ended the 1953 season with a third consecutive last place finish in the Western Association standings. The Twins ended the season with a record of 49–90, finishing in sixth place in the six-team league. Playing the season under managers Edwin Walls and Edwin Dickson, Fort Smith-Van Buren did not qualify for the four-team playoffs, won by the Hutchinson Cubs The Fort Smith franchise folded following the season.

Fort Smith did not return to the 1954 Western Association, which expanded to eight-team league without the Fort Smith membership. After Fort Smith folded, the Blackwell Broncos, Iola Indians, and Ponca City Jets teams were the new league franchises. The league permanently folded following the 1954 season. Fort Smith has not hosted another minor league team.

In 2023, Fort Smith was selected for a 2024 franchise in the newly formed Mid-America League. The team had yet to be named.

== The ballpark ==
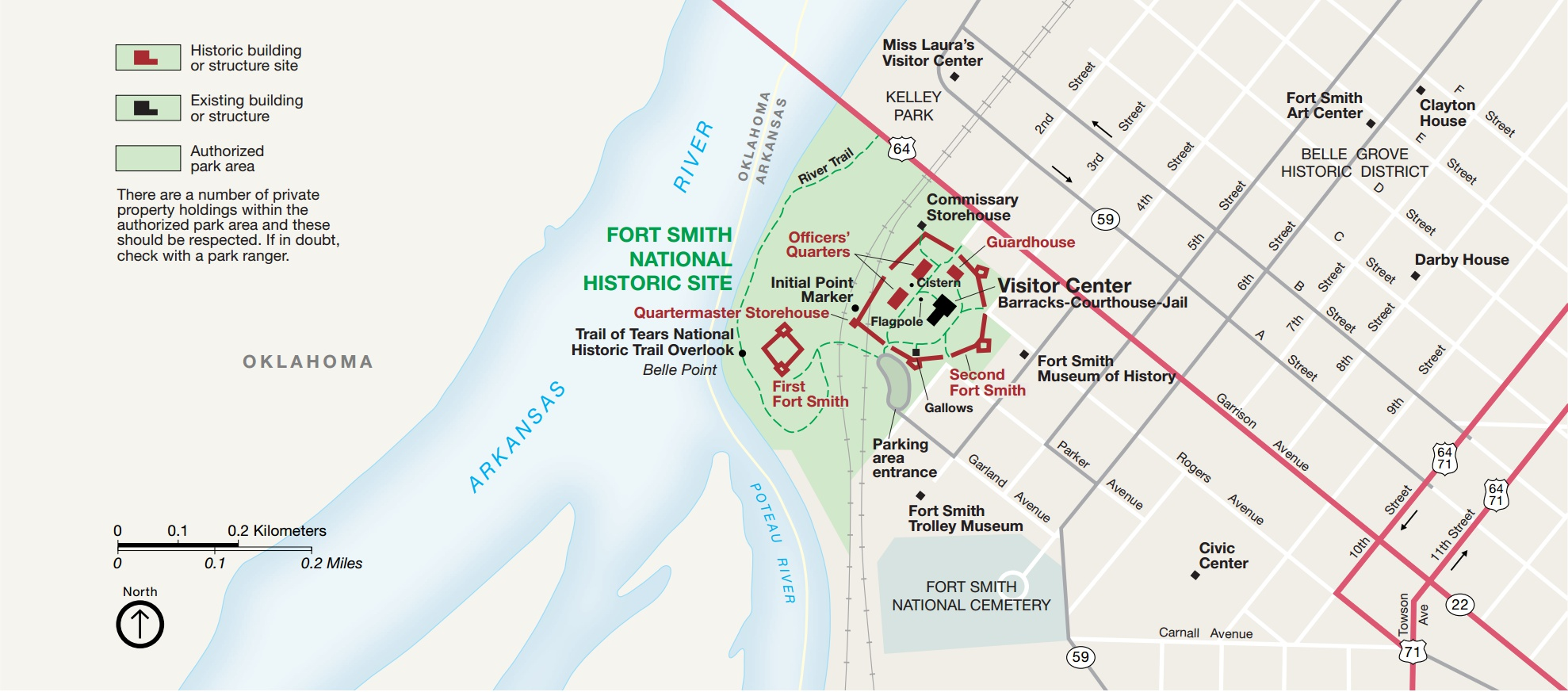
Fort Smith National Historic Site map. Andrews Field was located at South B Street & South 5th Street, directly south of the Fort Smith National Cemetery.

The Fort Smith teams hosted home minor league home games at Andrews Field.

Andrews Field was located near the previous ballpark in Fort Smith, Stadium Park. To replace the former ballpark, John M. Andrews, a local athletic director, led the drive to build a new ballpark. $25,000 was raised to construct the all-new steel and concrete stadium, which was a first in Arkansas. On Friday, May 20, 1921, Andrews Field was dedicated before a minor league game between the Fort Smith Twins and the Henryetta Hens.

In 1936, the New York Giants, leaving their spring training site, played a game at Andrews Field against the Cleveland Indians. The Giants and the Indians came back again and played the game annually through 1942.

In the 1960s, a tornado hit the Andrews Field location and everything but the concrete grandstand was destroyed. The ballpark underwent $30,000 in renovations in the 1970s and became a softball field, utilized by the Sebastian County Softball League.

In May 2010, the adjacent Fort Smith National Cemetery needed additional property for expansion. The Andrews Field grandstand was torn down and the land repurposed. Andrews Field was located at the corner of South B Street and South 5th Street in Fort Smith, Arkansas.

== Timeline ==
Year(s)	# Yrs.	Team	Level	League	Affiliate	Ballpark
1938–1942	5	Fort Smith Giants	Class C	Western Association	New York Giants	Andrews Field
1946–1949	4	Fort Smith Giants	Class C	Western Association	New York Giants	Andrews Field
1951–1952	2	Fort Smith Indians	Class C	Western Association	Cleveland Indians	Andrews Field
1953	1	Fort Smith-Van Buren Twins	Class C	Western Association	No affiliate	Andrews Field

== Year–by–year records ==
Year	Record	Finish	Manager	Playoffs/Notes
1938	74–65	3rd	Frank Brazill	Lost in 1st round
1939	83–50	1st	Herschell Bobo	Won pennant Lost in 1st round
1940	71–64	3rd	Herschell Bobo	Lost in final
1941	73–60	4th	Herschell Bobo	Lost in final
1942	68–63	3rd	Freddie Lindstrom	Won first half pennant League champions
1946	67–63	5th	Hugh Willingham	Won first half pennant Lost in final
1947	58–78	7th	Earl Wolgamot	Did not qualify
1948	82–58	2nd	Jack Aragon	Lost in 1st round
1949	86–54	2nd	Harold Kollar	Lost in 1st round
1951	43–80	8th	Paul O'Dea	No playoffs held due to flooding
1952	69–77	6th	Harry Griswold	Did not qualify
1953	49–90	6th	Edwin Walls / Edwin Dickson	Did not qualify

== Notable alumni ==
- Freddie Lindstrom (1946, MGR) Inducted Baseball Hall of Fame, 1976
- Woody Abernathy (1942)
- Ed Albrecht (1946–1947)
- Hub Andrews (1942)
- Jack Aragon (1948, MGR)
- Herschell Bobo (1939–1941, MGR)
- Frank Brazill (1938, MGR)
- Ken Brondell (1941–1942)
- Foster Castleman (1949)
- Otis Delaporte (1942)
- Harry Feldman (1938–1939)
- Bill Ford (1938)
- Harvey Gentry (1949)
- Oscar Georgy (1941)
- Jim Gladd (1940, 1943)
- Bob Hooper (1942)
- Sheldon Jones (1942)
- Buddy Kerr (1941)
- Frank Mancuso (1938)
- Howie Moss (1941)
- Charles Murphy (1939–1940)
- Tommy Neill (1938–1939)
- Roy Nichols (1940, 1942)
- Paul O'Dea (1951, MGR)
- Dan Osinski (1952)
- Lou Rochelli (1940)
- Ron Samford (1949)
- Mike Schemer (1941)
- Jim Sheehan (1938, 1941)
- Joe Stephenson (1942)
- Glen Stewart (1938)
- Red Tramback (1938)
- Hugh Willingham (1946, MGR)
- Earl Wolgamot (1947, MGR)

== See also ==
- Fort Smith Giants players
- Fort Smith Indians players
