= Frank Brazill =

American baseball player (1899–1976)

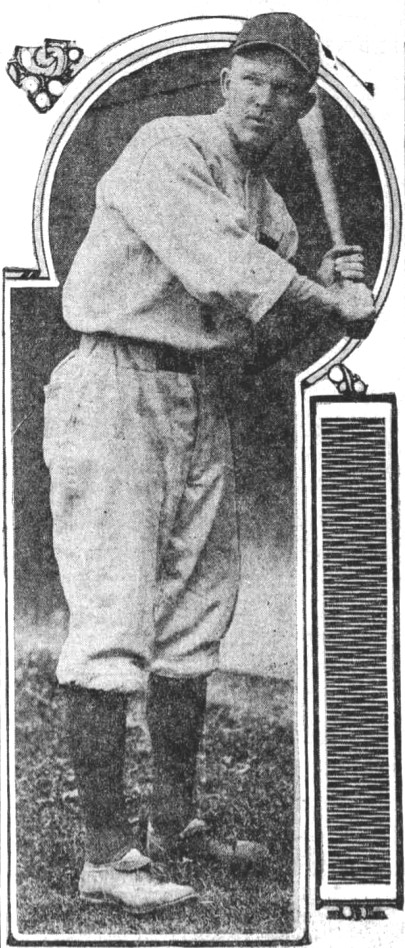
- First baseman
- Born: August 11, 1899; Scranton, Pennsylvania, U.S.
- Died: November 3, 1976 (aged 77); Oakland, California, U.S.
- Batted: Left Threw: Right

MLB debut
- April 13, 1921, for the Philadelphia Athletics

Last MLB appearance
- May 5, 1922, for the Philadelphia Athletics

MLB statistics
- Batting average: .258
- Home runs: 0
- RBI: 20
- Stats at Baseball Reference

Teams
- Philadelphia Athletics (1921–22)

Frank Leo Brazill (August 11, 1899 – November 3, 1976) was an American professional baseball first baseman whose career spanned nineteen seasons (1919–1938). During the 1921 and 1922 Major League Baseball (MLB) season he was a member of the Philadelphia Athletics.

== Biography ==
Brazill made his professional debut in the minor leagues in 1918 as a member of the Cumberland Colts. The other minor league teams he played for were the Hartford Senators (1919), the Winnipeg Maroons (1919), the Atlanta Crackers (1920), the St. Paul Saints (1920), the Portland Beavers (1921–24, 1928), the Seattle Indians (1925), the Los Angeles Angels (1926–27), the Mission Reds (1928), the Memphis Chickasaws (1929–1934), the Greenville Buckshots (1934), the Nashville Volunteers (1935), the Oklahoma City Indians (1935), the Tulsa Oilers (1935), the Greenwood Chiefs/Giants (1936–37) and the Fort Smith Giants (1938). He also managed several minor league teams from 1934 to 1939.

The Portland, Seattle and Los Angeles clubs he played with were all in the Pacific Coast League. In 2007, Brazill was inducted to the Pacific Coast League Hall of Fame.
