= Ray Perry (baseball) =

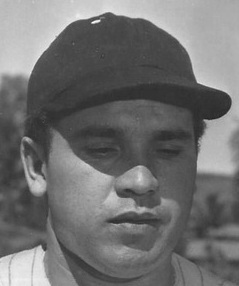
- Perry in 1947
- Third baseman
- Born: December 23, 1919; San Francisco, California, U.S.
- Died: May 3, 1973 (aged 53); Fremont, California, U.S.
- Batted: Right Threw: Right

Career statistics
- Batting average: .323
- Home runs: 348
- Runs batted in: 1,609
- Stats at Baseball Reference

Teams
- Salt Lake City Bees (1940); Tacoma Tigers (1941); San Francisco Seals (1941–1942, 1945–1946); Redding Browns (1948–1951); San Diego Padres (1952); El Dorado Oilers (1952); Little Rock Travelers (1952); Bakersfield Indians (1953–1954); Cedar Rapids Raiders (1955); Reno Silver Sox (1956–1958); Macon Dodgers (1960)

Raymond Lawrence Perry (December 23, 1919 – May 3, 1973) was an American professional baseball player, manager and scout.

== Career ==
Perry was born in San Francisco, California, in 1919. He was 5'7" tall and weighed 175 pounds. Primarily a third baseman, he started his professional baseball career in 1940 with the Salt Lake City Bees of the class C Pioneer League. That season, he had a .295 batting average, 17 home runs, and 94 runs batted in. In 1941, he spent most of the season with the Tacoma Tigers of the class B Western International League and batted .313 with 12 home runs and 88 RBI. In 1942, Perry played for the San Francisco Seals of the Pacific Coast League, the best minor league during that era. In 167 games, he batted .256 with 12 home runs and 75 runs batted in.

Perry then missed the 1943 and 1944 seasons while he was in the military during World War II. He returned to the Seals in 1945 and batted .271 with 5 home runs and 67 RBI. In April 1946, he fractured his leg during a game, which kept him out for the rest of 1946 and 1947.

In 1948, Perry returned to professional baseball as a player-manager with the Redding Browns of the class D Far West League. He led the league in all three triple crown categories with a .411 batting average, 36 home runs, and 163 RBI. In 1949, he won the triple crown again with a .404 batting average, 45 home runs, and 155 RBI. In 1950, Perry batted .366 and led the league with 44 home runs and 170 RBI. He also managed the Browns to the league championship. In 1951, he batted .349 and led the league with 18 home runs and 128 RBI.

In 1952, Perry had short stints in the Pacific Coast League and the class AA Southern Association but played poorly, and he spent most of the season as a player-manager of the El Dorado Oilers of the class C Cotton States League. There, he batted .308 with 15 home runs and 60 RBI, leading the league in homers. In 1953, Perry became a player-manager of the Bakersfield Indians of the class C California League. He batted .337 with 36 home runs and 119 RBI, leading the league in homers. In 1954, he batted .341 and led the league with 37 home runs and 128 RBI. In 1955, he was a player-manager for the Cedar Rapids Raiders of the class B Illinois–Indiana–Iowa League. He batted .268 with 23 home runs and 82 RBI.

In 1956, Perry returned to the California League as a player-manager for the Reno Silver Sox. He batted .316 with 20 home runs and 101 RBI. In 1957, he batted .350 with 19 home runs and 124 RBI. In 1958, he batted .290 with 8 home runs and 50 RBI. In 1959, he continued to manage the Silver Sox but did not play. In 1960, Perry managed the Macon Dodgers of the class A South Atlantic League. He finished his professional baseball playing career with a .323 batting average, 348 home runs, and 1,609 RBI. In his 2001 book The New Bill James Historical Baseball Abstract, Bill James noted that Perry missed four seasons early in his career due to a war and an injury, which hurt his chances of making the major leagues.

From 1961 to 1967, Perry was a scout for the Chicago Cubs. He was a scout for the New York Yankees from 1968 to 1969 and for the Los Angeles Dodgers from 1970 until his death. In 1973, Perry died of a heart attack in Fremont, California. He had a wife and daughter.
