= Ángel Aragón =

Cuban baseball player (1890-1952)

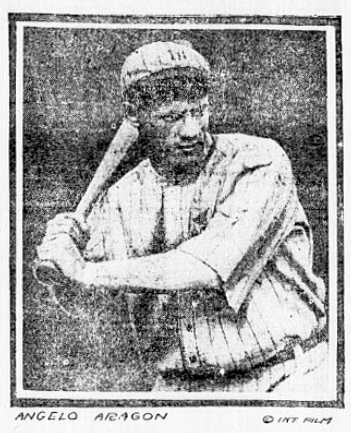
- Third baseman
- Born: August 2, 1890; Havana, Cuba
- Died: January 24, 1952 (aged 61); New York, New York, U.S.
- Batted: Right Threw: Right

MLB debut
- August 20, 1914, for the New York Yankees

Last MLB appearance
- July 14, 1917, for the New York Yankees

MLB statistics
- Batting average: .118
- Home runs: 0
- Runs batted in: 5
- Stats at Baseball Reference

Teams
- New York Yankees (1914–1917)

Ángel Aragón (August 2, 1890 – January 24, 1952) was a Cuban professional baseball player and father of Jack Aragón. Aragón spent his entire Major League Baseball career with the New York Yankees. He played in the Cuban League from 1912 to 1920. He was also the first Cuban and Latin American player to play for the Yankees.

Aragon became a scout for the New York Giants, a position he would serve until his death on January 25, 1952 at his home in Inwood, Manhattan.
