= Pittsburg Diamonds (Far West League) =

Pittsburg Dimonds
- 1948–1951; Pittsburg, California

Minor league affiliations
- Previous classes: Class D
- League: Far West League

Major league affiliations
- Previous teams: New York Giants (1948)

Minor league titles
- League titles: 1949

The Pittsburg Diamonds were a minor league baseball team that operated from 1948 to 1951 as part of the Class-D Far West League. They were based in Pittsburg, California. For a brief time in 1948 they moved to Roseville, California and played as the Roseville Diamonds.
