= Larry Shepard =

American baseball coach, coach, and manager

- Manager
- Born: April 3, 1919; Lakewood, Ohio, U.S.
- Died: April 5, 2011 (aged 92); Lincoln, Nebraska, U.S.
- Batted: Right Threw: Right

MLB statistics
- Games managed: 320
- Win–loss record: 164–155
- Winning %: .514
- Stats at Baseball Reference
- Managerial record at Baseball Reference

Teams
- As manager: Pittsburgh Pirates (1968–1969); As coach: Philadelphia Phillies (1967); Cincinnati Reds (1970–1978); San Francisco Giants (1979)

Career highlights and awards
- 2× World Series champion (1975, 1976)

Lawrence William Shepard (April 3, 1919 – April 5, 2011) was an American professional baseball player, manager, and pitching coach. He managed the Pittsburgh Pirates of Major League Baseball to a 164–155 win–loss record in 1968 and 1969.

== Biography ==
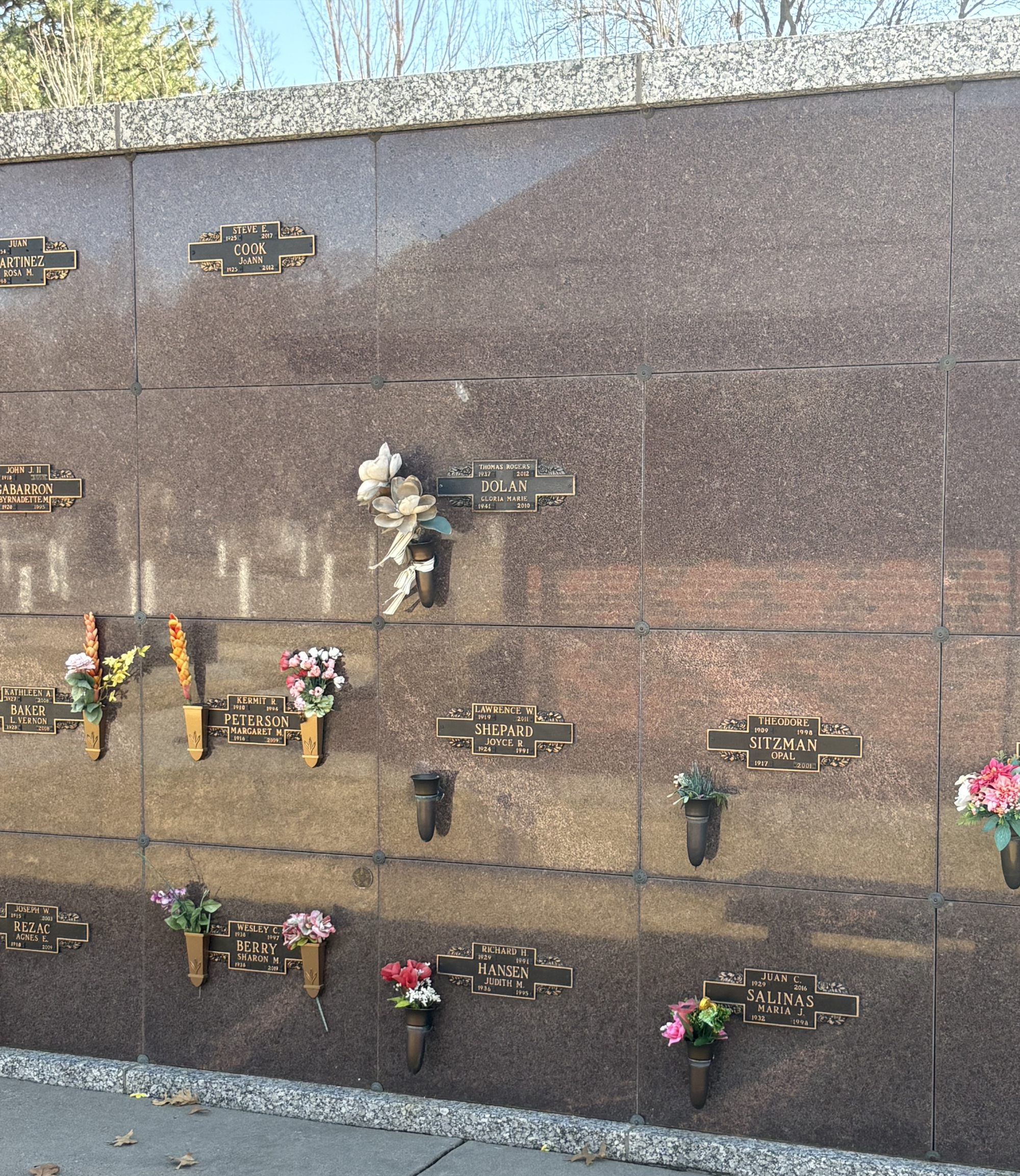
Shepard's grave (center) at Calvary Catholic Cemetery

Although he was born in Lakewood, Ohio, United States, Shepard lived with his family after the age of 14 in Montréal, Québec, Canada, where he attended McGill University.

During his playing days, Shepard was a right-handed pitcher who played minor league baseball from 1941 through 1956, with time out for United States Army service during World War II. He was listed as 5 feet 11 inches (1.80 m) tall and 180 pounds (82 kg). He became a playing manager in the Brooklyn Dodgers' farm system in 1948, with the Medford Nuggets of the Class D Far West League. His club finished second, thanks to the 22–3 record of its star pitcher – Shepard himself. He then moved up to the Billings Mustangs of the Class C Pioneer League, where, as a pitcher, he won 21, 22 and 24 games in successive (1949–51) seasons. As a skipper, his 1949 club won the league playoffs.

In 1952 and part of 1953, Shepard took a break from managing, becoming strictly a relief pitcher for the Hollywood Stars of the Pacific Coast League. Concurrently, he left the Dodger system for the Pirates' organization. He resumed his managerial career in the middle of the 1953 season in the Pittsburgh system, winning the 1956 and 1957 Western League championships with the Lincoln Chiefs. From 1958 through 1966, he managed at the Triple-A level for Pittsburgh with the Salt Lake City Bees and Columbus Jets, notching three first-place finishes.

In 1967, Shepard reached the Major League level when he was named pitching coach of the Philadelphia Phillies. After only one season, he was appointed manager of the Pirates. In his two seasons as skipper of the Bucs, Pittsburgh finished sixth in the ten-team National League in 1968 (with a record of 80–82) and fourth in the NL East at 84–73 in 1969 (when Shepard was released, that September 25). During his two seasons at the helm, he managed the legendary Roberto Clemente; Clemente batted .291 and .336, respectively, under Shepard.

After his firing by the Pirates, Shepard returned to the coaching ranks. He was the pitching coach of the fabled Cincinnati Reds "Big Red Machine" dynasty under Sparky Anderson from 1970 through 1978, with the Reds winning four National League pennants, two World Series championships, and five NL West titles over that nine-year stretch. He finished his coaching career with the San Francisco Giants in 1979, then scouted for the Giants.

Shepard died in Lincoln, Nebraska, at age 92 in 2011, and was buried there at Calvary Catholic Cemetery.

Preceded by Franchise established	Salt Lake City Bees manager 1958–1960	Succeeded by Herman Franks
Preceded by Cal Ermer	Columbus Jets manager 1961–1966	Succeeded by Harding "Pete" Peterson
Preceded by Cal McLish	Philadelphia Phillies pitching coach 1967	Succeeded by Al Widmar
Preceded by Harvey Haddix	Cincinnati Reds pitching coach 1970–1978	Succeeded by Bill Fischer
Preceded by Herm Starrette	San Francisco Giants pitching coach 1979	Succeeded by Don McMahon
