= Jack Aragón =

Cuban baseball player and manager (1915–1988)

- Catcher / Manager
- Born: November 20, 1915; Havana, Cuba
- Died: April 4, 1988 (aged 72); Clearwater, Florida, U.S.
- Batted: Right Threw: Right

MLB debut
- August 13, 1949, for the New York Giants

Last MLB appearance
- August 13, 1949, for the New York Giants

MLB statistics
- Games played: 1
- At bats: 0
- Stats at Baseball Reference

Teams
- New York Giants (1949)

Ángel Valdés "Jack" Aragón Reyes Jr. (November 20, 1915 – April 4, 1988) was a Cuban professional baseball player and manager.

His playing career spanned 13 season, including one game during the 1941 season in Major League Baseball with the New York Giants. In that one game, he was used as a pinch-runner and had no plate appearances. Aragón also played in the minor leagues with the Class-C Greenwood Giants, the Class-D Blytheville Giants, the Class-D Salisbury Giants, the Class-B Clinton Giants, the Class-B Winston-Salem Twins, the Class-A1 Knoxville Smokies, the Class-C Fort Smith Giants, the Double-A, and later Triple-A Minneapolis Millers, the Double-A, and later Triple-A Louisville Colonels and the Class-A Jacksonville Tars.

Aragón's managerial career lasted five seasons, including four of those as a player-manager. Aragón's baseball career was interrupted in 1942 as he in the United States Coast Guard during the World War II era. After being discharged in 1944 at the rank of Electrician's Mate, he returned to baseball. Over his minor league career, Aragón played 801 games. Aragón also served as a general manager for the Knoxville Smokies from 1952 to 1953, and the Maryville-Alcoa Twins from 1953 to 1954. He batted and threw right-handed.

== Professional career ==
=== Playing career ===
Aragón began his professional baseball career in 1937 with the Greenwood Giants of the Class-C Cotton States League. Greenwood was minor league baseball team affiliated with the New York Giants Major League Baseball franchise. That season, he batted .237 with nine hits, two doubles and two triples in 18 games played. On the defensive side, Aragón played all of his 18 games at the catcher position, committing two errors in 62 total chances.

In 1939, Aragón joined the Blytheville Giants of the Class-D Northeast Arkansas League. With Blytheville, who were a minor league affiliate of the New York Giants, Aragón batted .301 with 104 hits, 12 doubles, five triples and five home runs in 98 games played. In the field, he played 96 games as a catcher, committing 22 errors in 742 total chances, translating into a .970 fielding percentage. During the 1939 season, Aragón played with four different teams in three different organizations. First with the New York Giants organization, he played with the Class-D Salisbury Giants and the Class-B Clinton Giants. With Salisbury, who were members of the North Carolina State League, Aragón batted .238 with 15 hits and five doubles in 20 games played. All of those 20 games were at the catcher position. It is unknown how many games Aragón played with the Clinton Giants that season. After he played in the Giants organization, he moved on to the Cleveland Indians and Pittsburgh Pirates organizations'. With the Class-B Winston-Salem Twins, who were affiliated with the Indians, Aragón batted .236 with 22 hits, four doubles, two triples and two home runs in 32 games played. Aragón's fourth team that season were the Class-A1 Knoxville Smokies, who were affiliated with the Pirates organization. In 16 games with the Smokies, he batted .192 with five hits. Each team he played with the season used him as a catcher.

In 1940, Aragón made his return to the New York Giants organization, playing with the minor league Fort Smith Giants of the Class-C Western Association. He batted .189 with 17 hits and three doubles in 36 games played that season as a member of the Fort Smith club. During all of his 36 games, Aragón was used as a catcher, committing five errors in 186 total chances.

Aragón began working for the New York Giants as a batting practice catcher in 1941. He did not play with the Giants until August 13, 1941, a game that would mark his only appearance in Major League Baseball. In that game, which was against the Boston Braves, Aragón was used as a pinch runner and did not have a plate appearance.

In 1942, during the midst of World War II, Aragón left professional baseball and entered the United States Coast Guard. He was stationed at Ellis Island during the war and was discharged on January 15, 1944, as an Electrician's Mate.

After his discharge from the Coast Guard, Aragón returned to professional baseball, signing with the Minneapolis Millers of the Double-A American Association in 1944. He batted .199 with 35 runs, 74 hits, 16 doubles, two triples, seven home runs, 43 runs batted in (RBIs) and seven stolen bases in 127 games played that season. In the field, he played all of his recorded defensive appearances (117 games) at catcher, committing 20 errors in 526 total chances. During the 1945 season, Aragón played with two teams, the Minneapolis Millers and the Louisville Colonels. While the Millers were not affiliated with any major league organization, the Colonels were a minor league affiliate of the Boston Red Sox. In 88 combined games that season, Aragón batted .247 with 32 runs, 60 hits, 15 doubles, one home run and 32 RBIs. On defense, he played 79 games at catcher, committing 16 errors in 370 total chances.

In 1946, Aragón spent the entire season with the Louisville Colonels, batting .217 with five hits and three RBIs in 11 games played. In the field, he played 10 games at the catcher position, committing one error in 55 total chances. Aragón split the 1947 season between the Minneapolis Millers and the Louisville Colonels. With the Colonels, who were still affiliated with the Boston Red Sox, Aragón played 67 games. On August 9, 1947, the Red Sox traded him along with Frank Genovese and Lum Harris to the New York Giants in exchange for Russ Rolandson, Augie Bergamo and Ken Jungels. The Giants then assigned Aragón to the Millers where he played 11 games. Between the two teams that season, Aragón batted .218 with 20 runs, 42 hits, 14 hits, one double and 16 RBIs.

=== Managerial career ===
Aragón began his managerial career in 1948 with the Class-C Fort Smith Giants in the New York Giants organization. Aragón was a player-manager, meaning that while he managed the team, he also played for them. On the season, he batted .264 with 29 hits, four doubles and one home run in 44 games played. Fort Smith that season went 82–58 finishing second in the Western Association, losing in first round the league playoffs. On January 9, 1949, it was announced that Aragón would become the manager of the Jacksonville Tars, who were members of the Class-A South Atlantic League. During the season, Aragón broke every bone in his hand after punching the wall of the dugout when the umpire did not make a call in his favor. Aragón was also used as a player that season, batting .246 with 45 hits, nine doubles, two triples and one home run in 80 games played. The Tars finished the season with a record of 73–81.

During the 1952 season, Aragón joined the Knoxville Smokies of the Class-B Tri-State League as their player-manager. He also served at their general manager. As a player, Aragón batted .193 with 28 hits, five doubles and four home runs in 71 games played. The Smokies as a team finished the season with a record of 89–58.They were first in the league in record, but lost in the first round of the league playoffs. In 1951, Aragón continued playing and managing the Smokies. On the season, Aragón batted .288 with 49 hits, 11 doubles, one triple and five home runs in 82 games played. Aragón also led the Smokies to a 60–79 record. In 1953, Aragón was only used as a manager, making the first time in his career that he did not play while managing. He was replaced mid-season that year as manager of the Smokies by Leon Culberson. Later that season, Aragón became the general manager of the Maryville-Alcoa Twins, who were members of the Mountain States League. During the 1954 season, Aragón quit that position due to a financial disagreement.

== Personal ==
Aragón was born in Havana, Cuba on November 20, 1915. Although he was born in Havana, Aragón was raised in New York City. His father, Ángel Aragón, was also a professional baseball player who played 32 career games in Major League Baseball with the New York Yankees. Jack Aragón died on April 4, 1988, in Clearwater, Florida and was buried at Serenity Gardens Memorial Park in Largo, Florida.
