= Red Rollings =

American baseball player (1904–1964)

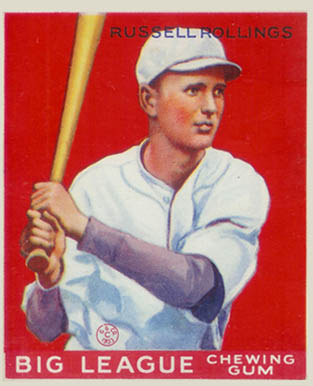
- Red Rollings' 1933 Goudey baseball card, while a member of the Atlanta Crackers
- Infielder
- Born: March 31, 1904; Mobile, Alabama, U.S.
- Died: December 31, 1964 (aged 60); Mobile, Alabama, U.S.
- Batted: Left Threw: Right

MLB debut
- April 17, 1927, for the Boston Red Sox

Last MLB appearance
- September 11, 1930, for the Boston Braves

MLB statistics
- Batting average: .251
- Home runs: 0
- Runs batted in: 28
- Stats at Baseball Reference

Teams
- Boston Red Sox (1927–1928); Boston Braves (1930)

William Russell "Red" Rollings (March 31, 1904 – December 31, 1964) was an American reserve infielder in Major League Baseball who played from 1927 through 1930 for the Boston Red Sox (1927–1928) and Boston Braves (1930). Listed at 5 ft 11 in (1.80 m), 167 lb., Rollings batted left-handed and threw right-handed. He was born in Mobile, Alabama.

In a three-season career, Rollings was a .251 hitter (89-for-355) with 36 runs and 28 runs batted in in 184 games, including 13 doubles, two triples, five stolen bases, and a .311 on-base percentage with no home runs.

Rollings died at the age of 60 in his hometown of Mobile, Alabama.
