= Otis Delaporte =

American football and baseball player and coach

Biographical details
- Born: January 6, 1919; Luther, Oklahoma, U.S.
- Died: April 1, 1981 (aged 62)

Playing career

Football
- 1937–1939: Central Oklahoma

Basketball
- 1937–1939: Central Oklahoma

Baseball
- 1937–1938: Central Oklahoma
- 1941: Oklahoma City Indians
- 1941: Salina Millers
- 1942: Fort Smith Giants
- Positions: End (football); Second baseman, third baseman (baseball)

Coaching career (HC unless noted)

Football
- 1964–1977: Southwestern Oklahoma State

Administrative career (AD unless noted)
- 1964–1981: Southwestern Oklahoma State

Head coaching record
- Overall: 90–52–2
- Tournaments: 1–1 (NAIA D-I playoffs)

Accomplishments and honors

Championships
- 4 OCAC (1968–1971); 2 OIC (1974, 1977)

Otis T. Delaporte (January 6, 1919 – April 1, 1981) was an American football and baseball player and coach. He served as the head football coach at Southwestern Oklahoma State University for 14 years from 1964 to 1977, compiling a 90–52–2 record and winning six conference titles. He also served as the school's athletic director until his death in 1981. Delaporte was married in 1939 to Francis Harryman.

During his career, Delaporte was inducted into the Southwestern Oklahoma State Hall of Fame (1982), the Oklahoma Coaches Association Hall of Fame (1974), the National Association of Intercollegiate Athletics Hall of Fame (1981), and the University of Central Oklahoma Athletics Hall of Fame in 1995.

== Head coaching record ==
Year	Team	Overall	Conference	Standing	Bowl/playoffs
Southwestern State Bulldogs (Oklahoma Collegiate Athletic Conference) (1964–1973)
1964	Southwestern State	5–5–1	4–2–1	3rd	
1965	Southwestern State	5–5	3–4	T–4th	
1966	Southwestern State	7–3	5–2	2nd	
1967	Southwestern State	4–6	1–6	T–7th	
1968	Southwestern State	7–4	6–1	1st	
1969	Southwestern State	9–1	6–1	T–1st	
1970	Southwestern State	7–2–1	6–1–1	1st	
1971	Southwestern State	8–2	7–1	1st	
1972	Southwestern State	8–3	5–3	T–3rd	
1973	Southwestern State	3–7	2–6	8th	
Southwestern Oklahoma State Bulldogs (Oklahoma Intercollegiate Conference) (1974–1977)
1974	Southwestern Oklahoma State	6–3	4–1	1st	
1975	Southwestern Oklahoma State	5–5	2–3	3rd	
1976	Southwestern Oklahoma State	4–7	0–4	5th	
1977	Southwestern Oklahoma State	11–1	4–0	1st	L NAIA Championship
Southwestern Oklahoma State:		90–52–2	55–35–2		
Total:		12–22			
National championship Conference title Conference division title or championship game berth
