= Klamath Falls Gems (1948–1951) =

Minor league baseball team

- 1948–1951; Klamath Falls, Oregon

Minor league affiliations
- Class: Class D (1948–1951)
- League: Far West League (1948–1951)

Major league affiliations
- Team: Philadelphia Phillies (1948–1951)

Minor league titles
- League titles (1): 1951

Team data
- Ballpark: Gem Stadium (1948–1951)

The Klamath Falls Gems were a Class D minor league baseball team that played in the Far West League from 1948 to 1951. They were a Class D affiliate of the Philadelphia Phillies. They played at Gem Stadium (now called Kiger Stadium).

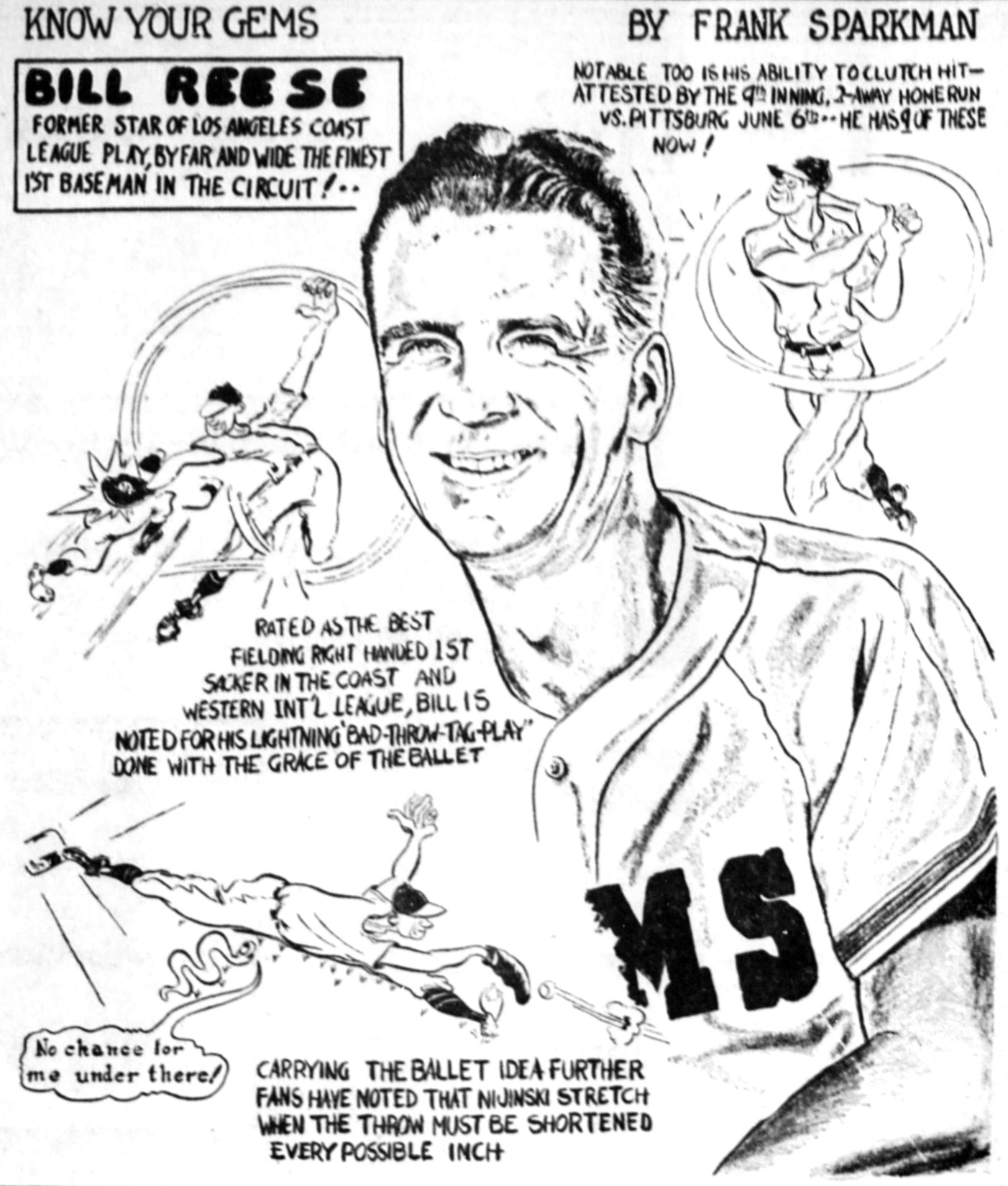
A sketch of Bill Reese from the 1949 team, published as part of a "Know Your Gems" series in the local newspaper, the Herald and News

The Gems had a winning record in all four seasons they played. They won the league in 1951, but the Far West League folded after that season and the Gems folded with it. A few Gems managed to reach the major leagues, including Jim Pendleton and Bob Bowman, who played 457 and 256 career MLB games respectively.

No other minor league team has played in Klamath Falls since. However, the Gems name was revived in the 2010s for a collegiate summer league team. That team folded after the 2018 season.

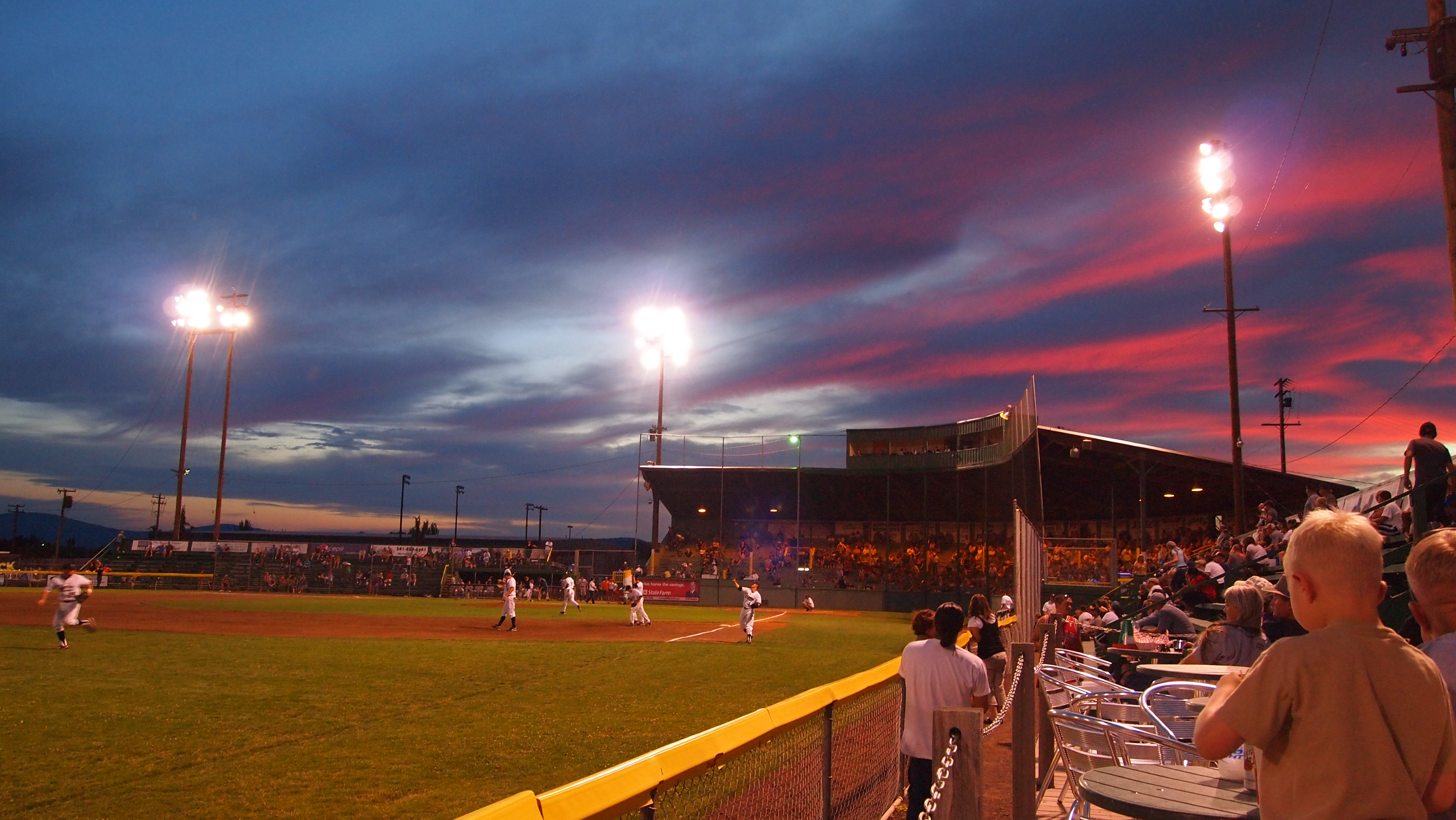
Gem Stadium (now Kiger Stadium) in 2012

== Year-by-year record ==
Year	Record	Finish	Manager	Playoffs
1948	67-58	3rd	Joe Gantenbein	Lost League Finals
1949	78-46	2nd	Hub Kittle	Lost in first round
1950	87-52	1st	Hub Kittle	Lost League Finals
1951	74-54	2nd	Bill DeCarlo	League Champs
