= Gus Suhr =

American baseball player (1906–2004)

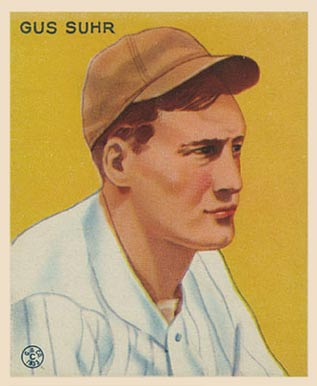
- First baseman
- Born: January 3, 1906; San Francisco, California, U.S.
- Died: January 15, 2004 (aged 98); Scottsdale, Arizona, U.S.
- Batted: Left Threw: Right

MLB debut
- April 15, 1930, for the Pittsburgh Pirates

Last MLB appearance
- May 12, 1940, for the Philadelphia Phillies

MLB statistics
- Batting average: .279
- Home runs: 84
- Runs batted in: 818
- Stats at Baseball Reference

Teams
- Pittsburgh Pirates (1930–1939); Philadelphia Phillies (1939–1940)

Career highlights and awards
- All-Star (1936)

August Richard Suhr (January 3, 1906 – January 15, 2004) was an American Major League Baseball (MLB) first baseman. Suhr was born in San Francisco, California. The fourth son of August H Suhr and Elise (Nobmann) Suhr, both of German descent. He batted left-handed and threw right-handed.

Suhr was a career .279 hitter with 84 home runs and 818 RBI in 1435 games played with the Pittsburgh Pirates (1930–39) and Philadelphia Phillies (1939–40). He hit better than .300 twice, with a career high .312 in 1936 and .303 in 1939 with the Pirates and Phillies. Defensively, he recorded a career .992 fielding percentage as a first baseman. Prior to playing in the majors, Suhr played for the San Francisco Seals. In 1929, he hit .381 with 51 home runs and 177 RBI for his team. During that season, he became the only player in baseball history to be sued (in addition to his team) by a fan injured after being struck by a foul ball he hit. The case was dismissed under the legal Baseball Rule, a verdict upheld by the California Supreme Court three years later. In his rookie season with the Pirates, he belted 17 homers with 107 RBI. He produced three 100-RBI seasons in his 11-year career. Selected for the 1936 All-Star game, Suhr played 1,339 games at first base for Pittsburgh, a team record for a Pirates' first baseman.

On September 11, 1931, Suhr started a then National League record streak of 822 games played, which ended on June 4, 1937 when he missed a game to attend his mother's funeral. His record stood until June 12, 1957 when it was broken by Stan Musial. The record is currently held by Steve Garvey.

After retiring from baseball, Suhr became a liquor store owner. He died in Scottsdale, Arizona, of natural causes at the age of 98.

== See also ==
- List of Major League Baseball career triples leaders
- Major League Baseball consecutive games played streaks
