= Oroville Red Sox =

- (1948); Oroville, CA

Minor league affiliations
- Previous classes: Class D
- League: Far West League

Major league affiliations
- Previous teams: Boston Red Sox

Team data
- Previous parks: Mitchell Field

The Oroville Red Sox were a minor league baseball team that operated in 1948 as part of the Class-D Far West League. They were based in Oroville, California and played at Mitchell Field as an affiliate of the Boston Red Sox. The team was managed by Nino Bongiovanni.

The Oroville Red Sox won the Far West League title in 1948. Despite this, in October of that year, San Jose Red Sox business manager Bob Freitas announced that the team would likely be losing their franchise due to low ticket sales and a $50,000 loss.
