= Nino Bongiovanni =

American baseball player (1911–2009)

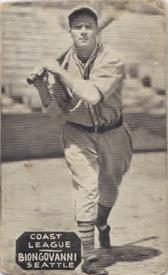
- Outfielder
- Born: December 21, 1911; New Orleans, Louisiana, U.S.
- Died: January 6, 2009 (aged 97); San Jose, California, U.S.
- Batted: Left Threw: Left

MLB debut
- April 23, 1938, for the Cincinnati Reds

Last MLB appearance
- October 1, 1939, for the Cincinnati Reds

MLB statistics
- Games played: 68
- Batting average: .259
- Runs batted in: 16
- Stats at Baseball Reference

Teams
- Cincinnati Reds (1938–1939)

Anthony Thomas "Nino" Bongiovanni (December 21, 1911 – January 6, 2009) was an American professional baseball player and manager. He played two seasons in Major League Baseball for the Cincinnati Reds. Bongiovanni was 5 feet, 10 inches tall and weighed 175 pounds.

== Career ==
Bongiovanni was born in New Orleans, Louisiana, in 1911. He started his professional baseball career in 1933 with the Pacific Coast League's Seattle Indians. Bongiovanni played in the PCL for five seasons, batting over .300 in three of them. In 1937, he batted .322 and led the league with 236 hits. He was then drafted by the Cincinnati Reds in October of that year.

Bongiovanni appeared in two games for the Reds in 1938 but spent most of the season with the International League's Syracuse Chiefs, where he batted .321 with 12 home runs. In 1939, Bongiovanni returned to the Reds. He started the season as a pinch hitter, became the team's regular right fielder in July, and then returned to mostly pinch hitting by September. In 66 games, he had a .258 batting average. Cincinnati won the National League pennant, and Bongiovanni appeared in the 1939 World Series against the New York Yankees. He made an out in his only at bat, which came in game 3.

In January 1940, Bongiovanni was traded to the Yankees. He went into the Yankees's farm system that year and never played in the majors again. Bongiovanni's career was interrupted during World War II, when he was in the military. He returned to professional baseball in 1946, and in 1947, he batted a career-high .363 in the California League. In 1948, he became a player-manager for the Far West League's Oroville Red Sox, batting .350 in 82 games. He finished his career the following season as a player-manager for the California League's Stockton Ports.

In later years, Bongiovanni owned a business and worked for the Santa Clara Unified School District. He died in San Jose, California, in 2009. He was survived by his wife, Dora, and three children - Linda, Terry, and Daniel. Daniel Bongiovanni played baseball for Santa Clara University in 1976–78.

Daniel's son Tony Bongiovanni played for University of California, Davis Baseball team 2007–2010.
