= Cliff Dapper =

American baseball player (1920–2011)

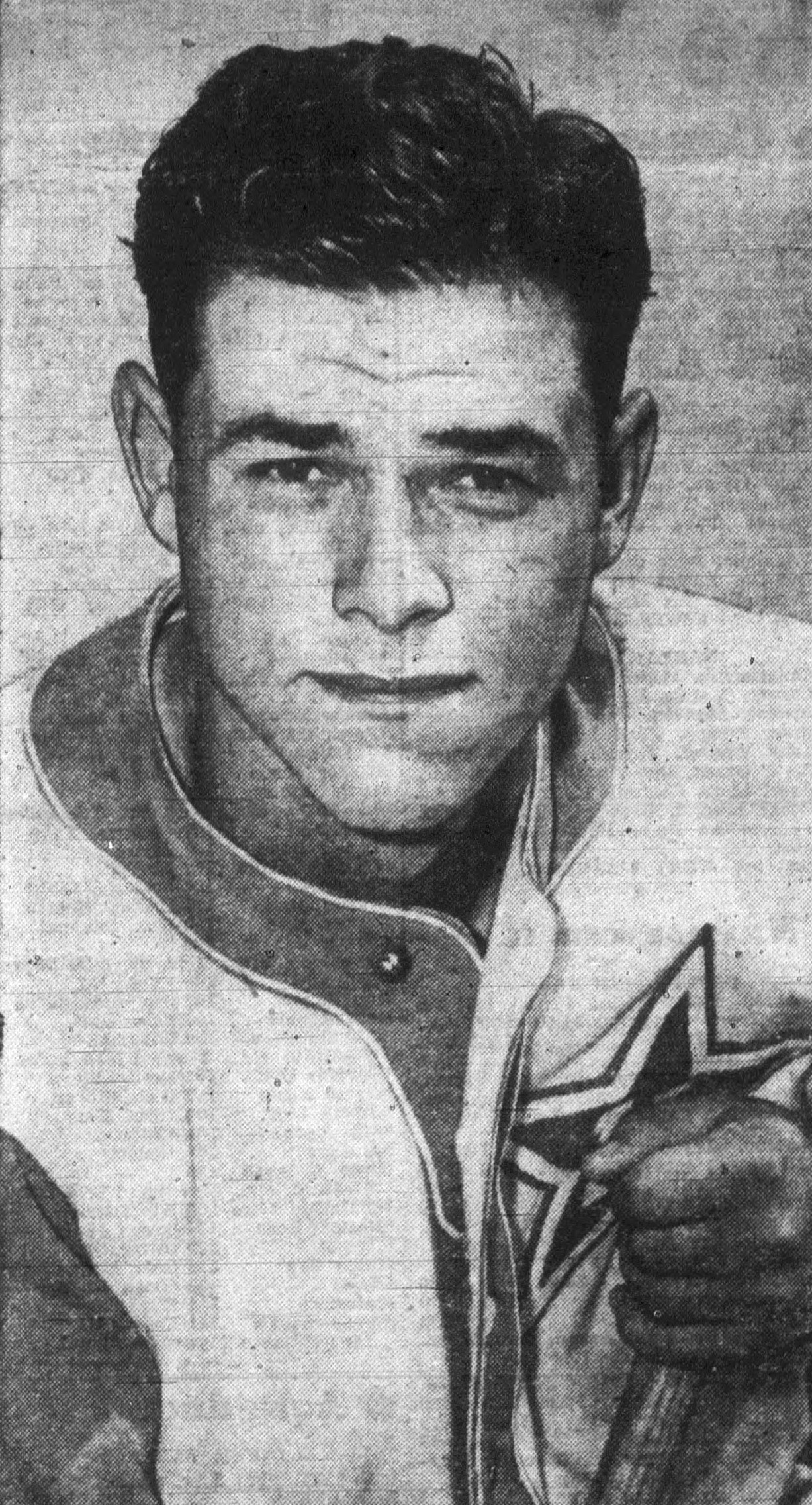
- Dapper, circa 1941
- Catcher
- Born: January 2, 1920; Los Angeles, California, U.S.
- Died: February 8, 2011 (aged 91); Fallbrook, California, U.S.
- Batted: Right Threw: Right

MLB debut
- April 19, 1942, for the Brooklyn Dodgers

Last MLB appearance
- May 3, 1942, for the Brooklyn Dodgers

MLB statistics
- Batting average: .471
- Home runs: 1
- Runs batted in: 9
- Games played: 8
- Stats at Baseball Reference

Teams
- Brooklyn Dodgers (1942)

Career highlights and awards
- Became the only player to be traded for a broadcaster (Ernie Harwell)

Clifford Roland Dapper (January 2, 1920 – February 8, 2011) was an American Major League Baseball catcher who played for the Brooklyn Dodgers during the 1942 season. Listed at 6 ft 2 in (1.88 m), 190 pounds (86 kg), he batted and threw right-handed.

Born in Los Angeles, Dapper began his baseball career at age 18 for the Class-B Bellingham Chinooks in the Western International League. With many players unavailable due to World War II, Dapper got his shot at the majors in April 1942, appearing in eight games for Brooklyn. He recorded eight hits in 17 at-bats for a .471 batting average, including a home run, one double, two runs and nine RBI. Despite his hot hitting, Dapper was unable to dislodge all-star Mickey Owen from the catcher's position for the Dodgers, and he was returned to the minors. Later that season he was drafted into the US Navy, and missed the 1943–45 seasons while serving in the South Pacific during World War II.

Following his military discharge, Dapper returned to baseball as a player and then manager, helming Pittsburgh Pirates farm clubs in Eugene, Oregon, and Billings, Montana, all while still an active player. He eventually played 1,623 minor-league games over a twenty-year span, hitting .274 and 102 homers before retiring in 1957, the same year that his former team, the Brooklyn Dodgers, moved to his home town of Los Angeles.

== Traded for Ernie Harwell ==
Dapper held the unique distinction of having been traded for an announcer. In 1948, Dapper, then with the Dodgers' top farm club, the Class-AAA Montreal Royals of the International League, was sent to the then-unaffiliated Class AA Atlanta Crackers of the Southern Association—the Dodgers' GM Branch Rickey wanted Ernie Harwell to substitute for ailing Dodger broadcaster Red Barber, and the Crackers' president Earl Mann wanted a player in return. Dapper batted .280 in 115 games and managed the Crackers in 1949.

While Dapper returned to the Dodgers organization the following year, playing for another Brooklyn-affiliated AAA team—the Hollywood Stars of the Pacific Coast League—in 1950, Harwell left the Dodgers after the 1949 season, broadcasting the New York Giants and Baltimore Orioles through the 1950s before spending the next 42 years with the Detroit Tigers. Harwell and Dapper would not meet for over half a century, until Dapper came to Comerica Park on September 15, 2002, when Harwell's statue at the Tigers' home was unveiled.

== After baseball ==
Following his baseball career, Dapper settled in Fallbrook, California, buying a ranch alongside former Dodgers teammate Duke Snider where they made a substantial living farming avocados and lemons on 60 acres. Dapper became president of the California Avocado Growers Council.

Dapper and his wife Stanna (née Curtis), who had been high school classmates and married in 1944, raised three sons—all catchers—and a daughter in Fallbrook. Stanna died in 2008, after which Dapper moved to an assisted living facility in Fallbrook, where he died at the age of 91 in 2011. Dapper and his wife are buried together at Riverside National Cemetery.
