= Medford Rogues (Far West League) =

Medford Nuggets / Rogues
- 1948–1951; Medford, Oregon

Minor league affiliations
- Class: Class D (1948–1951)
- League: Far West League (1948–1951)

Major league affiliations
- Team: New York Giants (1950); Brooklyn Dodgers (1948)

Team data
- Name: Medford Rogues (1950–1951); Medford Nuggets (1948–1949)
- Ballpark: Jackson County Baseball Park

The Medford Nuggets / Rogues were a Minor League Baseball team based in Medford, Oregon. They were members of the Class D Far West League from 1948 through 1951.

== Medford Nuggets ==
The Medford Nuggets formed part of the Far West League from 1948 through 1949. They were an affiliate of the Brooklyn Dodgers in 1948 but were unaffiliated in 1949. Some sources list the team as the Medford Dodgers in the 1948 season. The team played their home games at Jackson County Baseball Park (renamed "Miles Field" in 1969) in Medford.

=== Season-by-season records ===
Year	Record	Finish	Manager	Playoffs
1948	66–56	2nd	Larry Shepard	Lost 1st round
1949	39–84	6th	Dan Reagan	Did not qualify

=== Future major leaguers ===
- Glen Gorbous (1949)
- Larry Shepard (1948)

== Medford Rogues ==
The team name was changed to the Medford Rogues the following season, and played under that name from 1950 to 1951. In the Rogue Valley, Medford's Bear Creek is a tributary of the Rogue River.

The Rogues were an affiliate of the New York Giants in 1950 and were unaffiliated in 1951. The team folded in 1951 when they were unable to find a new home field after the ballpark was destroyed in a mysterious fire following a night game on July 3.

=== Year-by-year records ===
Year	Record	Finish	Manager	Playoffs
1950	69–70	4th	Tommy Nelson; Wilfred Jonas	Lost 1st round
1951	47–67	5th	Frank Lucchesi	Did not qualify

=== Future major leaguers ===
- Frank Lucchesi (1951)
- Tommy Nelson (1950)

== Later teams in Medford ==
The Medford franchise was known to have paved the way for future teams in the city like the Medford Giants, Medford Dodgers, and the Medford A's / Southern Oregon Timberjacks of the short-season Class A Northwest League.

The West Coast League, a collegiate summer baseball league, fielded a new franchise that began play in the summer of 2013 at Harry & David Field in Medford.
