= Joe Gantenbein =

American baseball player (1915-1993)

- Infielder
- Born: August 25, 1915; San Francisco, California, U.S.
- Died: April 20, 1993 (aged 77); Novato, California, U.S.
- Batted: Right Threw: Right

MLB debut
- April 20, 1939, for the Philadelphia Athletics

Last appearance
- September 28, 1940, for the Philadelphia Athletics

MLB statistics
- Batting average: .272
- Home runs: 8
- Runs batted in: 59
- Stats at Baseball Reference

Teams
- Philadelphia Athletics (1939–1940)

Joseph Steven Gantenbein (August 25, 1915 – April 20, 1993) was an American Major League Baseball infielder in Major League Baseball who played from 1939 to 1940 for the Philadelphia Athletics. Listed at 5' 9", 168 lb., Gantenbein batted and threw right handed. He was born in San Francisco.

In a two-season career, he posted a .272 batting average with eight home runs and 59 RBI in 186 games played.

He also played for six Minor league teams in parts of 10 seasons spanning 1935–1949.

Gantenbein died in Novato, California, at the age of 77.
