= Redding Browns =

- 1948–1951; Redding, California

Minor league affiliations
- Previous classes: Class D
- League: Far West League

Major league affiliations
- Previous teams: St. Louis Browns

Minor league titles
- League titles: 1950

Team data
- Previous parks: Tiger Field

The Redding Browns were a minor league baseball team that operated from 1948 to 1951 as part of the Class-D Far West League. They were based in Redding, California. They were affiliated with the St. Louis Browns of the American League and won the league championship in 1950. Ray Perry led the league in home runs and RBI each year of its existence as well as managing the team and serving as team president.

A book was written about the history of this team.

== Redding Browns Night ==
In 2010, the Chico Outlaws, one of just two professional baseball teams in the North State since the end of the Far West League, the other being the Chico Heat, hosted a Redding Browns night where the Outlaws wore Redding Browns jerseys, with the first 500 fans at Nettleton Stadium receiving a free Redding Browns t-shirt.

== Chico Outlaws in Redding ==
Since the departure of the Redding Browns, Redding has played host to only ten professional baseball games. Those ten games were "home" games for the Chico Outlaws who played an hour away. The games against the Yuma Scorpions were moved to Redding because of scheduling conflicts at Nettleton Stadium, and also served as a test of fan interest in a possible future North American League team in Redding. Five games were played at Tiger Field and five at Shasta College's baseball field. The ten games were played over six days. Attendance averaged 815 fans per game and the Outlaws won four of the ten games. One of the winning pitchers for the Outlaws was local Redding product Jason Stevenson who would sign with San Francisco Giants organization at finish the season with the Double-A Richmond Flying Squirrels.

== Proposals for professional baseball in Redding ==
Before the 1977 season, owner Carl Thompson worked to move his Grays Harbor Ports of the Northwest League to Redding due to wet weather at home games along the Olympic Peninsula. The proposal to play at Tiger Field was voted down by the Redding Parks and Recreation Commission as Tiger Field was used by 24 different amateur baseball teams throughout the spring and summer, and could not make room for the 35 home games the Ports play in the summer. Thompson sold the team, which remained at Olympic Stadium renamed the Grays Harbor Loggers and would fold after the 1980 season.

In the early 1980s, a group including then Seattle Mariners coach Bill Plummer, and Cottonwood livestock auction yard owner Ellington Peak, were in the works to bring the California League's Lodi Dodgers or Stockton Ports, then both owned by Plummer's former teammate Ed Sprague Sr. and his wife Michele Sprague, to Shasta County. The proposed stadium was to be built at the Shasta Fairgrounds in Anderson. Due to a drop in livestock prices, the deal fell through. The Lodi Dodgers moved to Southern California in 1986 and eventually became the Rancho Cucamonga Quakes, while the Ports stayed in Stockton and received a new stadium in 2005. In the early 2010s, Plummer again tried to help move a California League team to Redding in a joint venture with Chico, but instead the Bakersfield Blaze and High Desert Mavericks relocated to the Carolina League.

Redding was proposed as the home of an expansion team in three different independent leagues: the Golden State League and Western Baseball League in 1995, and the Golden Baseball League in 2005.

Between November 1997 and January 1998, the Western Baseball League's Salinas Peppers were in negotiations with the City of Redding and Shasta College, to relocate to Redding for the 1998 season. The proposal include $2–4 million in renovations to the baseball field at Shasta College, that would have included seating for 3,000, stadium lights, a new outfield fence, a scoreboard, a clubhouse and restrooms. The Redding Record Searchlight, whose poll of 300 Redding residents found 80% wanted the team, asked its readers for possible team names and received Shasta Lakes, Redding Timberwolves, and Redding Rattlers. On January 6, 1998, the Redding City Council voted 4–0 to reject a proposed $300,000 loan to the Peppers, which would have helped pay for stadium construction. Relocation to Redding was abandoned and the Peppers franchise folded. In 2001, there was again a short lived attempt to lure a WBL franchise to Redding, this time with the backing of the Redding Rancheria, who would have been the naming rights sponsor for a renovated Tiger Field, renamed Win-River Stadium.

In April 2008, a group in Redding bought the former Travis Credit Union Park from Vacaville, in order to be rebuilt on the campus of Simpson University in Redding. Previously the Golden Baseball League had considered buying the stadium and moving it to Redding for a new GBL franchise. A small fraction of the stadium was used in the 2014 renovation to Tiger Field in Redding, and the rest sits unused in an undisclosed location in Redding.
