= Santa Rosa Pirates =

- (1948–1949); Santa Rosa, California

Minor league affiliations
- Class: Class-D
- Previous leagues: Far West League

Major league affiliations
- Previous teams: Pittsburgh Pirates (1948)

Minor league titles
- League titles: 1 (1948)

Team data
- Previous names: Santa Rosa Cats; Santa Rosa Pirates (1948)
- Ballpark: Doyle Community Park

The Santa Rosa Pirates were a minor league baseball team, located in Santa Rosa, California from 1948–1949. The team was originally an affiliate of the Pittsburgh Pirates in 1948, winning the Far West League title. In 1949 the team was without an affiliate and played as the Santa Rosa Cats. After posting a 43-49 record in 1949, the Cats disbanded on August 4, 1949.

== Season-by-season ==
Year	Record	Finish	Manager	Playoffs
1948	63-59	4th	Dan Reagan	Won League Championship
1949	43-49	3rd	Joe Abreu / Alvin Kruk / Lembert Serpa / Lou Vezilich	Team disbanded August 4
