= Marysville Peaches =

- 1948–1950; Marysville, California

Minor league affiliations
- Class: Class D (1948–1950)
- League: Far West League (1948–1950)

Major league affiliations
- Team: Boston Braves (1948–1949)

Team data
- Name: Marysville Peaches (1950); Marysville Braves (1948–1949)
- Ballpark: Bryant Park (1948–1950)

The Marysville Braves were a minor league baseball team in the Class D Far West League in 1948 and 1949. They were an affiliate of the Boston Braves. In 1950, the team lost its Braves affiliation and became the Marysville Peaches.
