= Tommy Nelson (baseball) =

American baseball player

- Third baseman / Second baseman
- Born: May 1, 1917; Chicago, Illinois, U.S.
- Died: September 24, 1973 (aged 56); San Diego, California, U.S.
- Batted: Right Threw: Right

MLB debut
- April 17, 1945, for the Boston Braves

Last MLB appearance
- September 30, 1945, for the Boston Braves

MLB statistics
- Batting average: .165
- Home runs: 0
- Runs batted in: 6
- Stats at Baseball Reference

Teams
- Boston Braves (1945)

Tom Cousineau Nelson (May 1, 1917 – September 24, 1973) was an American Major League Baseball infielder who played for the Boston Braves in 1945. The 28-year-old rookie was a native of Chicago.

Nelson is one of many ballplayers who only appeared in the major leagues during World War II. He made his major league debut on April 17, 1945 (Opening Day), against the New York Giants at Braves Field. In 40 games he hit .165 (20-for-121) with 6 runs batted in and 6 runs scored, and his fielding percentage in 114 total chances was .904.

He died in 1973 in San Diego, California.
