= Midnight Sun Game =

Baseball game in Fairbanks, Alaska

Coordinates: 64°50′27″N 147°45′32″W

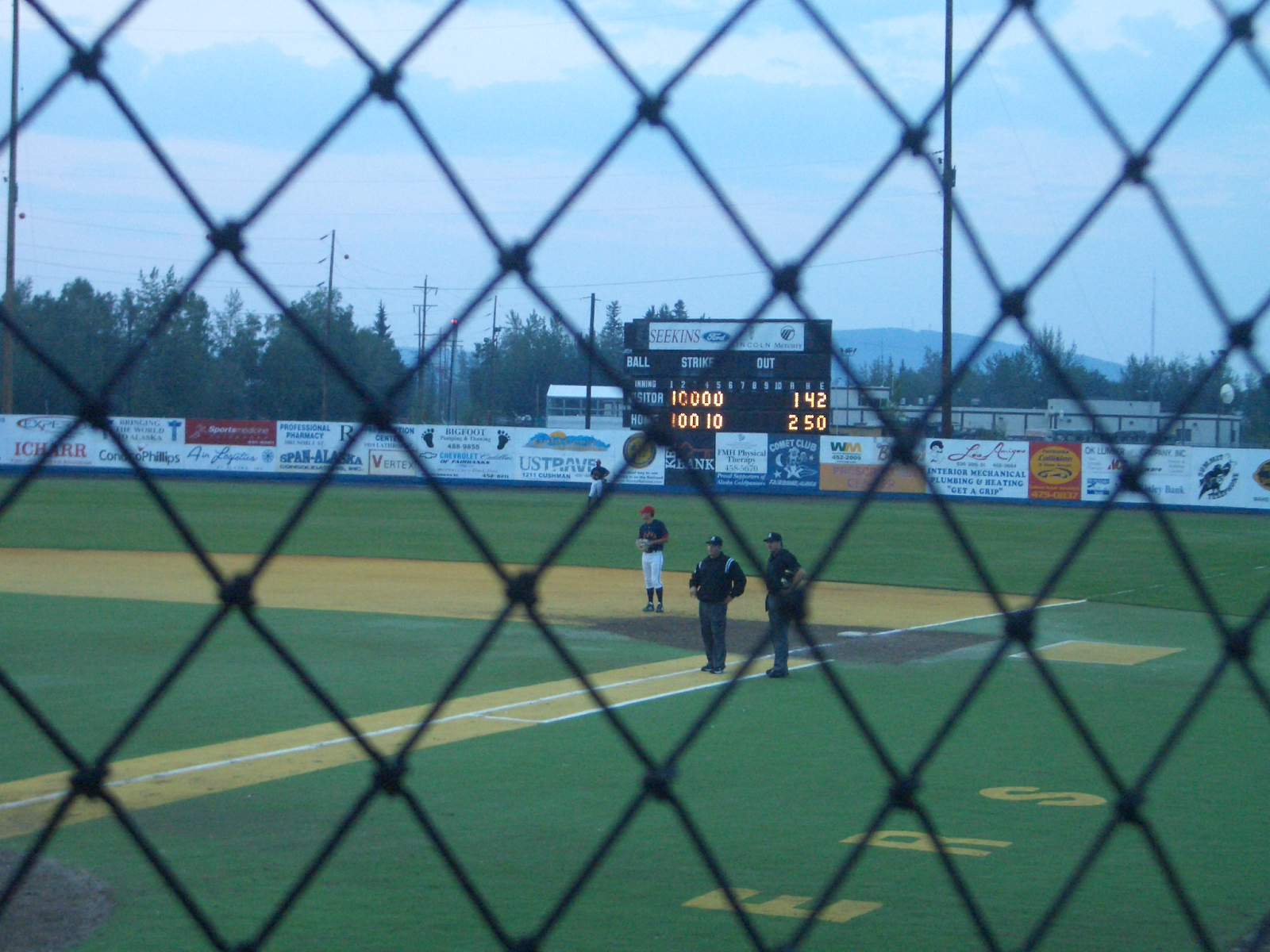
A photograph taken at midnight during the 2005 game, June 21, 2005.

Midnight Sun Game is an amateur baseball game played every summer solstice at Growden Memorial Park in Fairbanks, Alaska, United States. Because the sun is out for almost 24 hours a day, the game starts at about 10:30 at night and completes around 1:30 the next morning. However, because Fairbanks's summer time zone differs by about an hour from local solar time, coupled with the state's observance of daylight saving time, the game may not actually last until solar midnight, at about 1:53. If the summer solstice lands on a Saturday, the game is moved to the Friday night before to avoid competition with other Midnight Sun-related celebrations in Fairbanks that occur on the Saturday nearest the solstice. Famous players who have appeared in the game include Tom Seaver, Dave Winfield, Terry Francona, Harold Reynolds, Jason Giambi, and Bill "Spaceman" Lee.

After Noel Wien's arrival in 1924, he noted, "The baseball team played on weekends, and on June 21 and July 4 they always started a game at midnight sharp, just to indicate that this was the farthest city in the country."

The first game was in 1906. It was established by Eddie Stroecker, according to legend as part of a friendly wager; it was also conceived as a promotional gambit to bring people to Fairbanks. Artificial light has never been used; Growden Memorial Park has lights but has not turned them on for any purpose since 2003. The sun does dip below the horizon for about an hour. Since 1960, the game has been hosted by the Alaska Goldpanners, a collegiate summer baseball team based in Fairbanks that had been established the same year. As the Goldpanners have been without a league since leaving the Alaska Baseball League in 2015, the opponent has typically been picked from other collegiate summer teams from anywhere in the United States.

In 2020, the Goldpanners pulled out of the contest due to the COVID-19 pandemic; the game went on, with a local American Legion Baseball squad and the local Town Team Baseball squad agreeing to play the game in the Goldpanners' stead. The same game narrowly avoided what would have been the only rainout in the game's history. For 2021, the game expanded into a Midnight Sun Tournament, with a doubleheader consisting of the final of the American Legion Baseball tournament leading into the Goldpanners' Midnight Sun Game.

In 2026, in response to overwhelming demand for tickets, the Goldpanners set up a watch party in the ballpark parking lot with a Jumbotron displaying a live feed of the game to those who could not acquire tickets.

== Game results ==
Through 1959, the Midnight Sun Game featured various teams from the Fairbanks area. In 1960, the game became exclusively hosted by the Alaska Goldpanners. The Goldpanners are 49-15 all-time in Midnight Sun Games.

| Date | Winning team | | Losing team | | Notes |
|---|---|---|---|---|---|
| June 21, 1951 | Military All-Stars | 4 | Civilian All-Stars | 0 | |
| June 21, 1952 | Civilian All-Stars | x | Military All-Stars | x | No score available |
| June 21, 1953 | Civilian All-Stars | 6 | Military All-Stars | 2 | |
| June 21, 1954 | Civilian All-Stars | 5 | Military All-Stars | 0 | |
| June 21, 1955 | Civilian All-Stars | 12 | Military All-Stars | 8 | |
| June 21, 1956 | Civilian All-Stars | x | Military All-Stars | x | No score available |
| June 21, 1957 | Sportland | 6 | Air Force All-Stars | 0 | |
| June 21, 1958 | Sportland Bees | 5 | Ladd Special Units | 3 | |
| June 21, 1959 | Alaska Sales and Service | 16 | Fairbanks | 6 | |
| June 21, 1960 | Pan-Alaska Goldpanners | 11 | Fairbanks Pioneers | 0 | |
| June 21, 1961 | Pan-Alaska Goldpanners | 10 | North of the Range Military All-Stars | 4 | |
| June 22, 1962 | Pan-Alaska Goldpanners | 8 | North of the Range Military All-Stars | 3 | |
| June 21, 1963 | Wichita Rapid Transit Dreamliners | 3 | Alaska Goldpanners | 1 | |
| June 21, 1964 | Grand Junction Eagles | 10 | Alaska Goldpanners | 5 | |
| June 21, 1965 | Alaska Goldpanners | 4 | USC Trojans | 3 | |
| June 21, 1966 | Alaska Goldpanners | 8 | Oregon State Beavers | 3 | |
| June 21, 1967 | Kumagai Gumi | 10 | Alaska Goldpanners | 3 | |
| June 22, 1968 | Alaska Goldpanners | 7 | Santa Clara Broncos | 0 | |
| June 21, 1969 | Boulder Baseline Collegians | 5 | Alaska Goldpanners | 2 | |
| June 20, 1970 | Arizona Wildcats | 4 | Alaska Goldpanners | 3 | |
| June 21, 1971 | Alaska Goldpanners | 12 | Stanford Indians | 3 | |
| June 21, 1972 | Ponchatoula Athletics | 5 | Alaska Goldpanners | 4 | |
| June 21, 1973 | BYU Cougars | 8 | Alaska Goldpanners | 5 | |
| June 21, 1974 | Alaska Goldpanners | 7 | Washington State Cougars | 6 | |
| June 21, 1975 | Alaska Goldpanners | 4 | Vanderbilt Commodores | 3 | |
| June 20, 1976 | Alaska Goldpanners | 6 | Westwood Bruins | 4 | |
| June 21, 1977 | Alaska Goldpanners | 12 | Red Deer M&K Generals | 11 | |
| June 21, 1978 | Wichita El Dorado Coors | 10 | Alaska Goldpanners | 1 | |
| June 21, 1979 | Alaska Goldpanners | 8 | North Carolina Tar Heels | 2 | |
| June 20, 1980 | Alaska Goldpanners | 16 | Wisconsin Badgers | 5 | |
| June 20, 1981 | Alaska Goldpanners | 11 | Intermountain Badgers | 4 | |
| June 20, 1982 | Alaska Goldpanners | 9 | San Francisco Senators | 3 | |
| June 19, 1983 | Alaska Goldpanners | 7 | Anchorage Bucs | 2 | |
| June 21, 1984 | Alaska Goldpanners | 9 | Chinese Taipei | 0 | Forfeit |
| June 22, 1985 | Moraga Marauders | 12 | Alaska Goldpanners | 11 | 11 innings |
| June 20, 1986 | Alaska Goldpanners | 8 | San Francisco Senators | 1 | |
| June 20, 1987 | Mat-Su Miners | 2 | Alaska Goldpanners | 1 | |
| June 21, 1988 | Alaska Goldpanners | 6 | Hawaii Island Movers | 5 | |
| June 20, 1989 | Alaska Goldpanners | 7 | San Diego SeaWorld Killer Whales | 3 | |
| June 21, 1990 | Alaska Goldpanners | 12 | San Bernardino Tribe | 3 | |
| June 22, 1991 | Alaska Goldpanners | 9 | South Lake Tahoe Stars | 8 | |
| June 21, 1992 | Victor Valley Mets | 2 | Alaska Goldpanners | 1 | |
| June 21, 1993 | Alaska Goldpanners | 10 | South Lake Tahoe Stars | 4 | |
| June 21, 1994 | Alaska Goldpanners | 15 | San Diego Stars | 6 | |
| June 21, 1995 | Alaska Goldpanners | 10 | San Francisco Seals | 4 | |
| June 21, 1996 | Alaska Goldpanners | 5 | Anchorage Bucs | 3 | |
| June 20, 1997 | Alaska Goldpanners | 12 | Kelowna Grizzlies | 0 | |
| June 20, 1998 | Alaska Goldpanners | 14 | Kelowna Grizzlies | 7 | |
| June 21, 1999 | Alaska Goldpanners | 7 | Oceanside Waves | 1 | |
| June 21, 2000 | Alaska Goldpanners | 3 | Santa Barbara Foresters | 2 | |
| June 21, 2001 | Alaska Goldpanners | 2 | Oceanside Waves | 1 | |
| June 21, 2002 | Alaska Goldpanners | 2 | California Dons | 1 | |
| June 21, 2003 | Alaska Goldpanners | 3 | California Dons | 1 | |
| June 21, 2004 | Alaska Goldpanners | 9 | Peninsula Oilers | 1 | |
| June 21, 2005 | Alaska Goldpanners | 3 | Omaha Strike Zone | 1 | |
| June 21, 2006 | Alaska Goldpanners | 2 | Beatrice Bruins | 1 | |
| June 21, 2007 | Oceanside Waves | 5 | Alaska Goldpanners | 1 | |
| June 21, 2008 | Alaska Goldpanners | 10 | Southern California Running Birds | 6 | |
| June 21, 2009 | Alaska Goldpanners | 6 | Lake Erie Monarchs | 3 | |
| June 21, 2010 | Alaska Goldpanners | 4 | Heroes of the Diamond | 3 | 15 innings |
| June 21, 2011 | Alaska Goldpanners | 2 | Oceanside Waves | 1 | |
| June 21, 2012 | Alaska Goldpanners | 7 | Everett Merchants | 5 | |
| June 21, 2013 | Alaska Goldpanners | 4 | San Francisco Seals | 1 | |
| June 21, 2014 | Alaska Goldpanners | 13 | Lake Erie Monarchs | 6 | |
| June 21, 2015 | Alaska Goldpanners | 7 | Seattle Studs | 4 | |
| June 21, 2016 | Alaska Goldpanners | 9 | Kenai Peninsula Oilers | 2 | |
| June 21, 2017 | San Diego Waves | 4 | Alaska Goldpanners | 2 | |
| June 21, 2018 | Alaska Goldpanners | 6 | Orange County Surf | 4 | |
| June 21, 2019 | Seattle Studs | 5 | Alaska Goldpanners | 4 | 11 innings |
| June 21, 2020 | Eielson Brewers; Alaska Legion | 15 | Black Spruce Pirates; Fairbanks Adult Amateur Baseball League | 13 | Contested only by local teams due to COVID-19 pandemic |
| June 21, 2021 | Alaska Goldpanners | 3 | Everett Merchants | 0 | |
| June 21, 2022 | Alaska Goldpanners | 10 | San Diego Waves | 9 | 10 innings |
| June 21, 2023 | Alaska Goldpanners | 5 | Michigan Monarchs | 1 | |
| June 21, 2024 | Alaska Goldpanners | 10 | Seattle Studs | 4 | |
| June 20, 2025 | Anchorage Glacier Pilots | 7 | Alaska Goldpanners | 2 | |
| June 19, 2026 | Utah Yaks | 5 | Alaska Goldpanners | 3 | |
