= Ed Cheff =

American baseball coach (c. 1943–2022)

Biographical details
- Born: c. 1943; Butte, Montana, U.S.
- Died: January 15, 2022 (aged 78); Sequim, Washington, U.S.
- Education: Lewis & Clark College

Coaching career (HC unless noted)
- 1977–2010: Lewis–Clark State College

Head coaching record
- Overall: 1705–430–2 (.798)

Accomplishments and honors

Championships
- 16× NAIA World Series (1984, 1985, 1987–1992, 1996, 1999, 2000, 2002, 2003, 2006–2008)
- College Baseball Hall of Fame; Inducted in 2012

Ed Cheff (c. 1943 – January 15, 2022) was an American college baseball coach. He was the head coach for Lewis–Clark State College in Lewiston, Idaho, for 34 seasons (1977–2010), and was inducted into the College Baseball Hall of Fame in 2012.

== Early years ==
Born in Butte, Montana, Cheff was raised in Woodland, Washington. He graduated from Woodland High School and Lewis & Clark College in Portland, Oregon, where he played football and baseball for the Pioneers.

== Coaching ==
Cheff started his coaching career as a high school football coach in Tillamook, Oregon. His first baseball coaching position was with Lower Columbia College in Longview, Washington, where he coached the baseball team to a 120–24 (.833) record in four seasons.

In 1977, Cheff succeeded Ramon Hooker as head coach of the Lewis–Clark State baseball team. His Warriors won 16 National Association of Intercollegiate Athletics (NAIA) titles. A total of 114 of his former players went on to play professionally, with fourteen reaching the major leagues. Cheff was named NAIA coach of the year eight times. Despite playing at the NAIA level, his teams defeated NCAA Division I baseball teams, including having a winning record against the Washington State Cougars.

Cheff was inducted into the NAIA Hall of Fame in 1994 and the American Baseball Coaches Association (ABCA) Hall of Fame in 2006. He won the ABCA's Lefty Gomez Award, given for lifetime achievement in amateur baseball, in 2009. He was a coach with the United States national baseball team (1991, 1994) and managed the Alaska Goldpanners and Anchorage Bucs in the Alaska Baseball League.

Cheff retired in 2010, after compiling a 1,705–430–2 (.798) record at Lewis–Clark. He was inducted into the National College Baseball Hall of Fame in 2012.

== Personal life and death ==
Cheff and his wife, Karen, a retired elementary school teacher, had three sons: Trever, Tyler, Toby. Cheff died at his home in Sequim, Washington, on January 15, 2022, at the age of 78.

== See also ==
- List of college baseball career coaching wins leaders
