= Mat-Su Miners =

Baseball club

- Founded: 1976
- League: Alaska Baseball League
- Based in: Palmer, Alaska
- Ballpark: Hermon Brothers Field (Capacity: 1,700)
- Colors: Green, yellow
- Owner: Pete Christopher
- President: Terry Johnson
- Manager: Tyler LeBrun
- Championships: NBC (1987, 1997); ABL (1987, 1990, 2004, 2009, 2010, 2016, 2017, 2018, 2025, 2026)
- Website: https://www.matsuminers.org/

The Mat-Su Miners are a college summer baseball club in the Alaska Baseball League (ABL). The Miners are based in Palmer, Alaska, and their name refers to the Matanuska-Susitna Borough where Palmer is located. The team was founded in 1976 and play their home games at Hermon Brothers Field.

The franchise began play as the fourth Alaska-based team of the ABL along with the Fairbanks Goldpanners, Anchorage Glacier Pilots and the Peninsula Oilers for the 1976 season. Originally called the Valley Green Giants, the team would finish the inaugural season in last place. By the 1980 season the franchise would change its name to the Mat-Su Miners which it has been known as ever since. The franchise has won two National Baseball Congress championships for the 1987 and 1997 seasons.

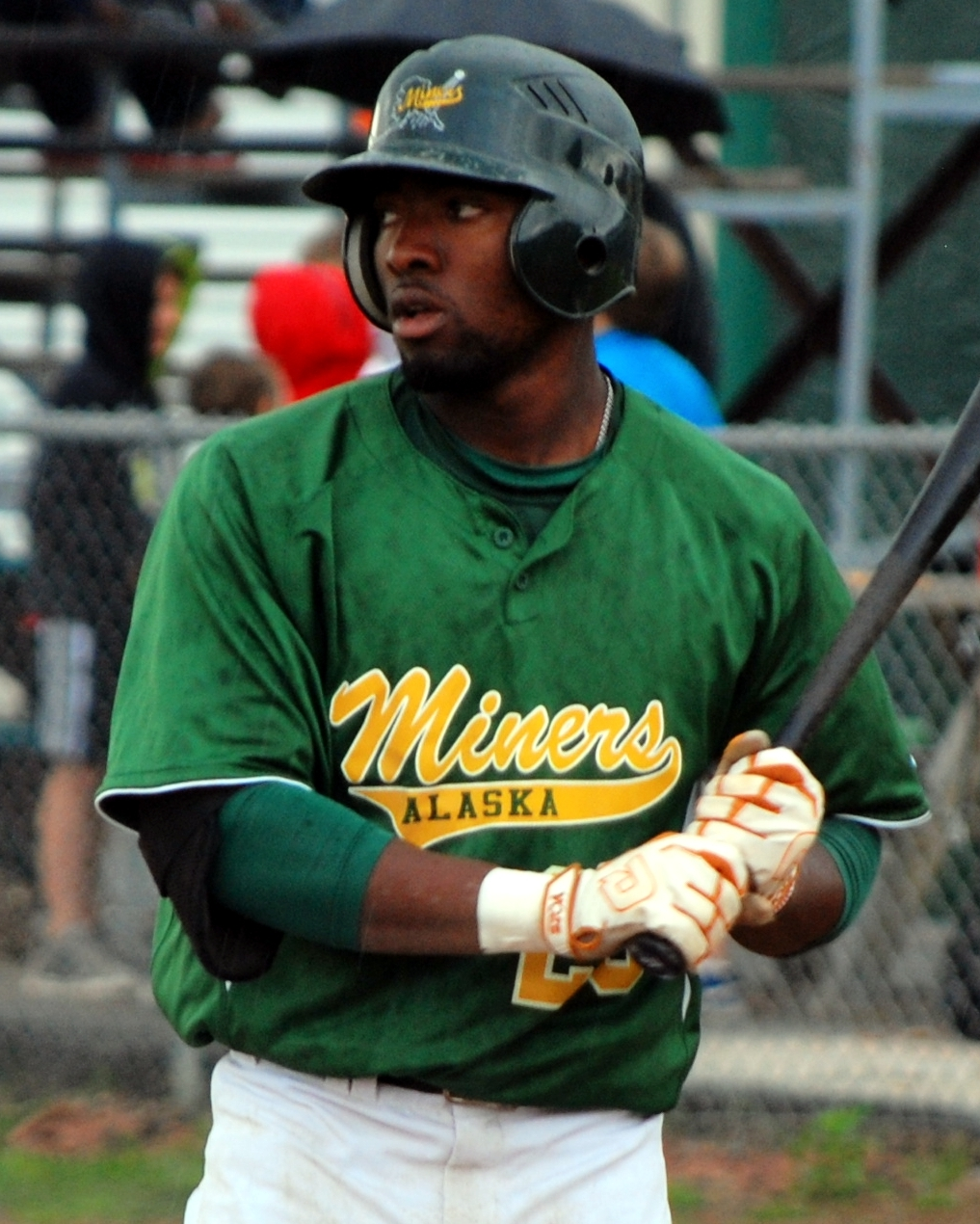
Christin Stewart with the Mat-Su Miners in 2013

== Notable alumni ==
- Eli Morgan, pitcher, Cleveland Indians
- Garrett Richards, pitcher, Texas Rangers
- Nick Senzel, outfielder, Cincinnati Reds

Asa Lacy, Pitcher, Kansas City Royals

Kyler Bush, Pitcher, Chicago White Sox
