= North Pole Nicks =

Alaskan baseball team, 1980 to 1991

Information
- League: Alaska Baseball League (1980–1987, 1989–1991) (Collegiate summer baseball (1980–1987, 1989–1991)
- Location: North Pole, Alaska
- Founded: 1980
- League championships: 1; 1986
- Former ballpark(s): Growden Memorial Park (1980–1983); Wright Field (1984–1987, 1989–1991)
- Mascot: Santa Claus
- President: Don Dennis
- Manager: Jerry McClain (1980–1981); Dan Cowgill (1982); Mike Gillespie (1983–1985); Frank Sanchez (1986); Jim Gattis (1987); Mike Studer (1989); Emmitt Wilson (1990–1991)

The North Pole Nicks were an amateur-level collegiate summer baseball league team based in North Pole, Alaska. Between 1980 and 1991, the North Pole Nicks played exclusively as members of the Alaska Baseball League, winning the 1986 league championship.

== History ==
The 1980 North Pole Nicks began play as a Collegiate summer baseball team and were founded by Don Dennis. The North Pole was a member of the Alaska Baseball League. The franchise initially played home games in nearby Fairbanks, Alaska for a few seasons, until Wright Field was eventually built in North Pole, Alaska.

The team nickname is in reference to the North Pole being the home of Santa Claus and "Nicks" is short for Saint Nicholas.

In 1985, the North Pole Nicks finished 2nd in the National Baseball Congress World Series. In the championship game, played at Lawrence-Dumont Stadium in Wichita, Kansas, North Pole was defeated by a score of 6–2 by the Liberal BeeJays from Liberal, Kansas.

The 1986 North Pole Nicks captured the Alaska Baseball League championship.

Following the 1987 season, the North Pole Nicks folded from the Alaska Baseball League, before rejoining the league for three more seasons beginning in 1989.

The North Pole Nicks were managed by Jerry McClain (1980–1981), Dan Cowgill (1982), Mike Gillespie (1983–1985), Frank Sanchez (1986), Jim Gattis (1987), Mike Studer (1989) and Emmitt Wilson (1990–1991). Clay Morgan was the team announcer.

In 2001, three former North Pole Nicks players, Steve Finley, Mark Grace and Luis Gonzalez were members of the World Series Champion Arizona Diamondbacks.

The team mascot for the North Pole Nicks was Santa Claus.

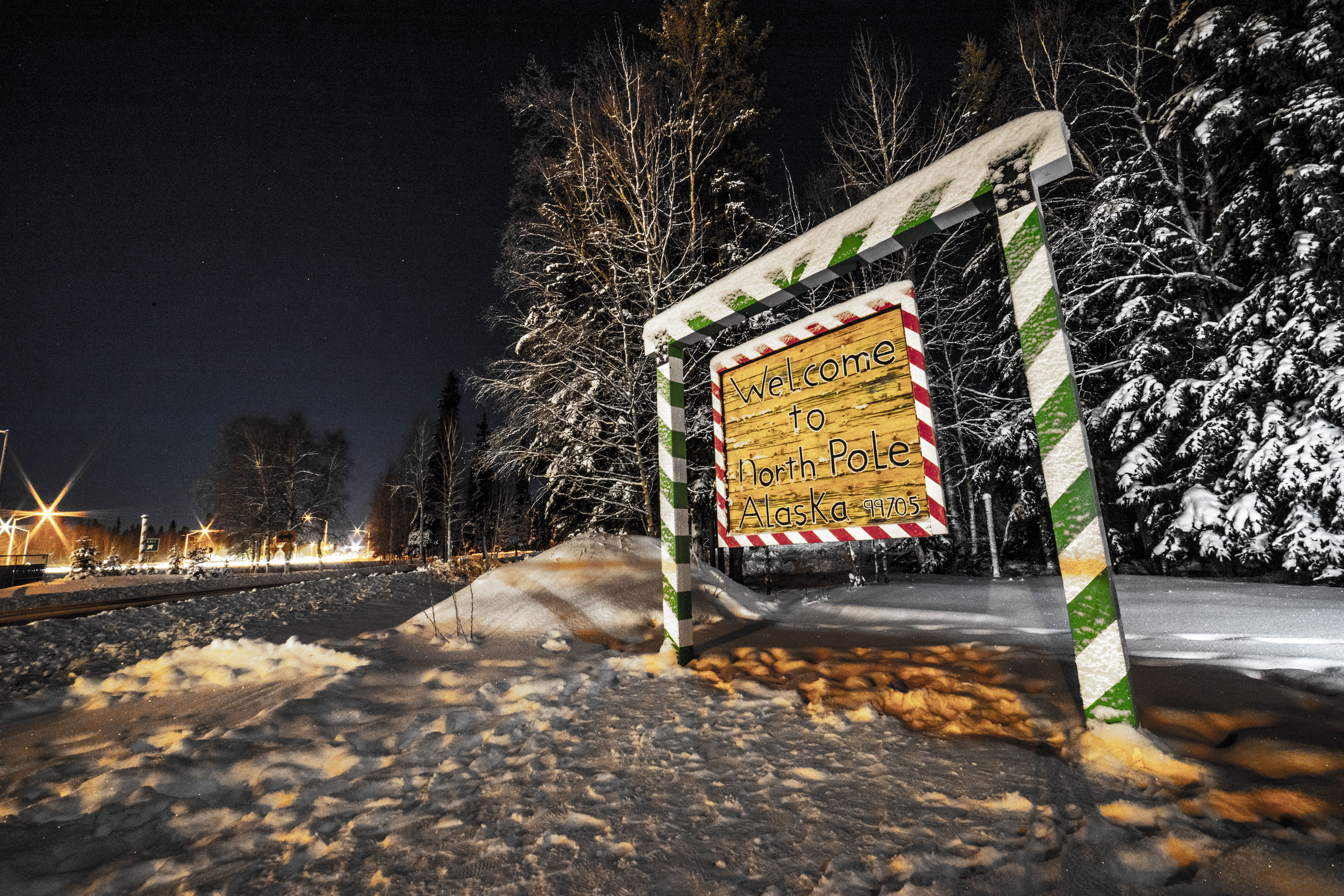
Welcome to North Pole Sign

== The ballparks ==
In their first seasons of play, the North Pole Nicks played at Growden Memorial Park in Fairbanks, Alaska, sharing the field with the Alaska Goldpanners until Wright Field was built in North Pole. Wright Field was located within Newby Park. Wright Field has served as the home to the North Pole High School baseball team.

== Timeline ==
Year(s)	# Yrs.	Team	Level	League
1980–1987	8	North Pole Nicks	Collegiate summer baseball	Alaska Baseball League
1989–1991	3	North Pole Nicks	Collegiate summer baseball	Alaska Baseball League

== Notable alumni ==
- Shawn Barton (1983–1984)
- Kevin Blankenship (1982)
- Chris Donnels (1985)
- Steve Finley (1986)
- Luis Gonzalez (1986–1987)
- Mark Grace (1985)
- Randy Hennis (1985)
- Eric Karros (1987)
- Chad Kreuter (1893)
- Scott Lewis (1987)
- Ever Magallanes (1986)
- Bryan Price (1981–1983)
- Brad Radke (1991)
- Jeff Robinson (1982)
- Roger Samuels (1981)
- Alex Sanchez (1985)
- Mike Schooler (1984–1985)
- Doug Simons (1987)
- Andy Stankiewicz (1984–1985)
- Jim Traber (1981)
- Jeff Wetherby (1984–1985)
- Todd Zeile (1984–1985)
