= Growden Memorial Park =

Outdoor park in Fairbanks, Alaska, United States

Coordinates: 64°50′25″N 147°45′35″W

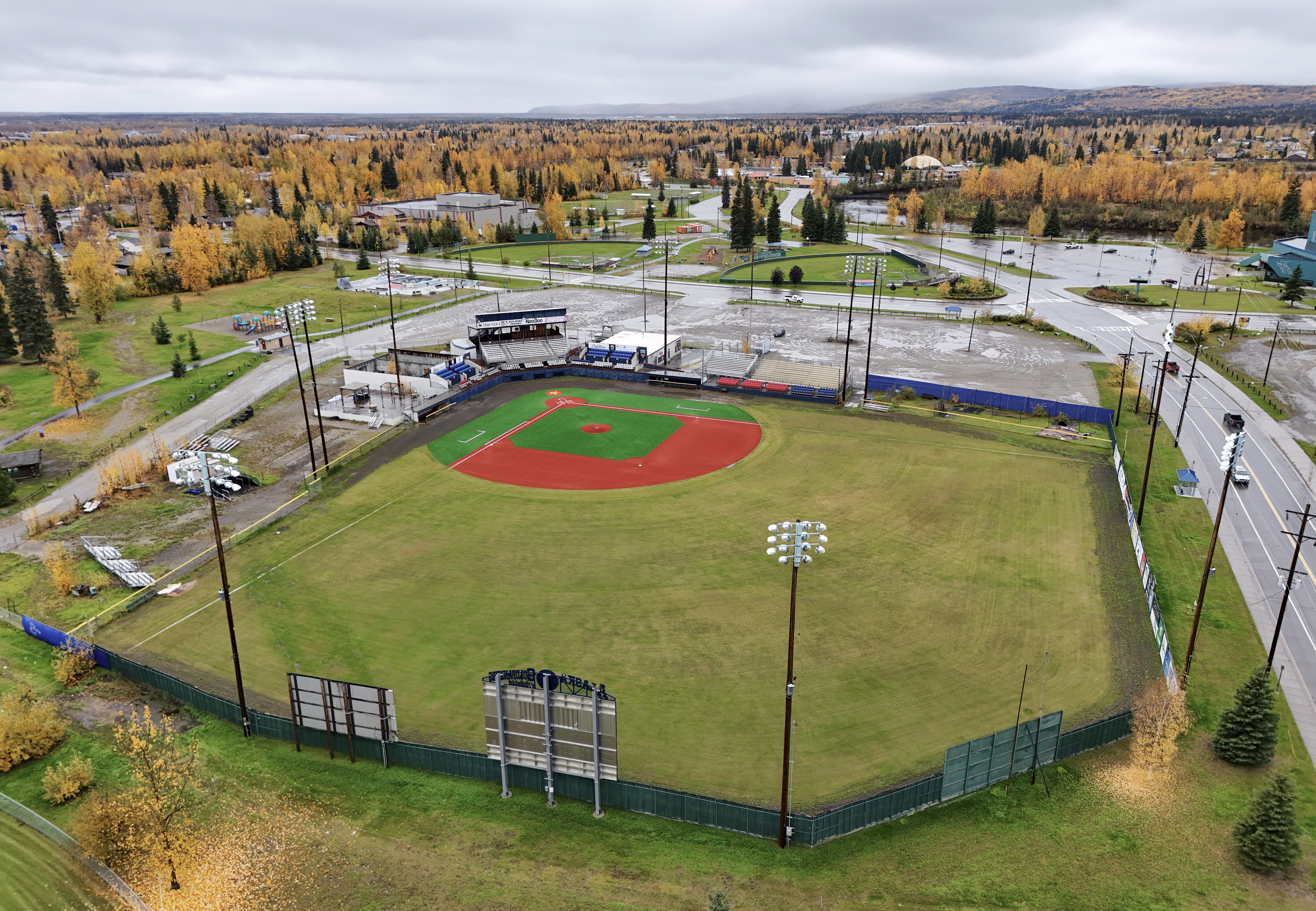
- The ballpark in 2024
- Interactive map of Growden Memorial Park
- Location: 207 Wilbur St; Fairbanks, AK 99701
- Capacity: 3,500
- Field size: Left Field: 315 ft Left-Center Field: 398 ft Center Field: 410 ft Right-Center Field: 398 ft Right Field: 330 ft

Tenant
- Alaska Goldpanners (ABL) (1960-present)

Growden Memorial Park is an outdoor park in Fairbanks, Alaska, United States. Originally called Memorial Park, the park was renamed in 1964 in memory of James Growden who, along with his two sons, lost his life in the tsunami created by the Good Friday Earthquake of 1964. Growden had been active in youth activities in Fairbanks for a number of years. The park was listed on the National Register of Historic Places in 2025.

== History and features ==
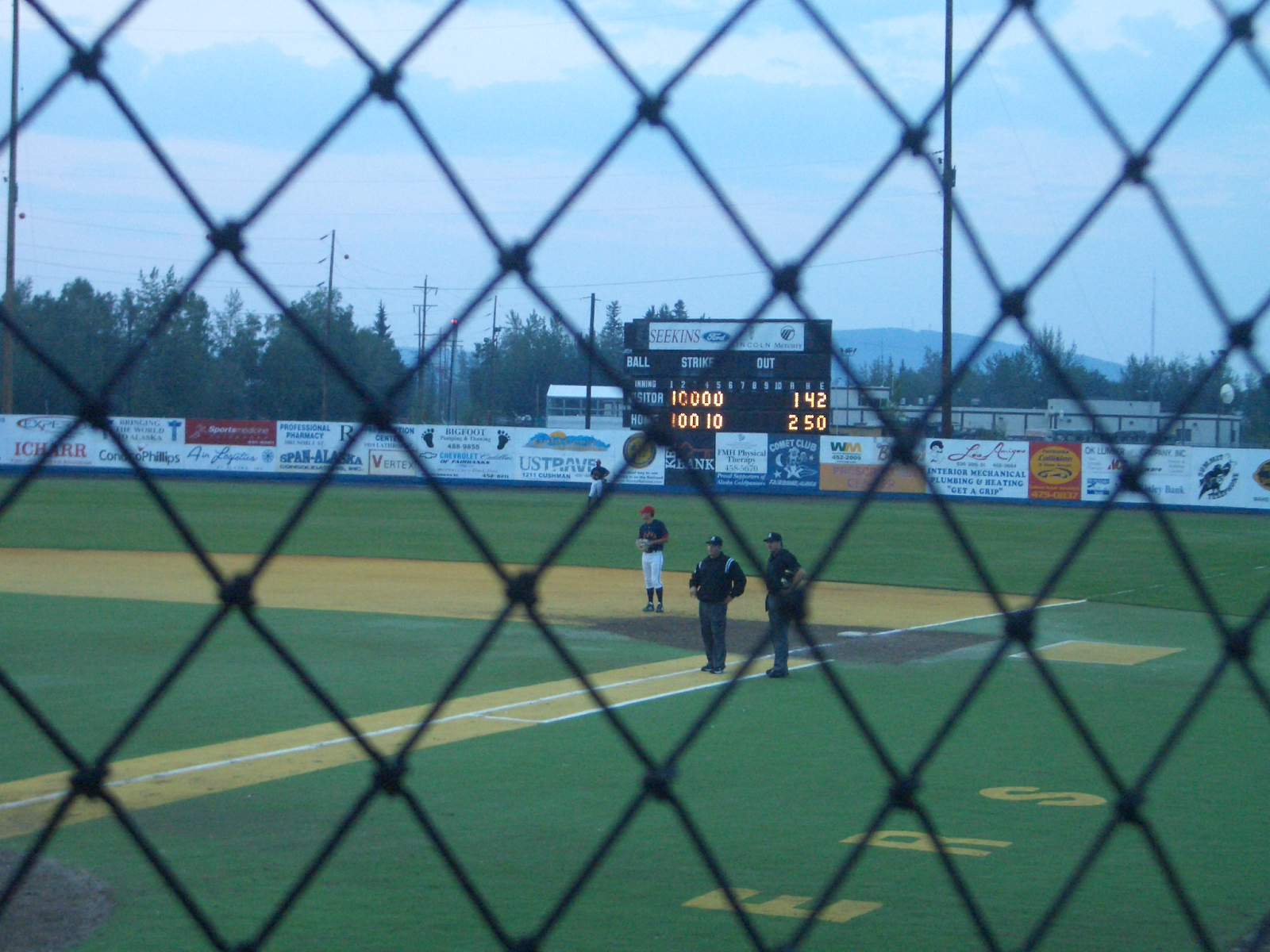
Growden Memorial Park on June 21, 2005, during annual Midnight Sun Game.

Growden Memorial Field is a baseball park located in Growden Memorial Park used for collegiate summer and high school baseball and has been the home field for the Alaska Baseball League's Alaska Goldpanners since 1960. It was also home to the defunct North Pole Nicks, before the Nicks relocated to Newby Field. Famous players to play at Growden include Tom Seaver, Dave Winfield, Rick Monday, Terry Francona, Bob Boone, Bret Boone, Jason Giambi, and Barry Bonds.

It also has played host to the Alaska School Activities Association state baseball championships over the last few years.

It has an artificial turf infield and a natural grass outfield. It contains several dozen box seats salvaged from Seattle's Sick's Stadium. The Carlson Center is located nearby.

The ballpark holds 3,500 people and plays host to the Midnight Sun Game. A crowd larger than 5,200 attended the 1967 Midnight Sun Game when the Goldpanners hosted Kumagai-Gumi of Japan.

The John Weaver Skate Park, four youth baseball fields, one youth softball field and volleyball courts are located in the park.
