= Pat Doyle =

Pat Doyle may refer to:

- Pat Doyle (baseball) (born 1944), baseball coach
- Pat Doyle (golfer) (1889–1971), Irish golfer
