= Mulcahy Stadium =

Baseball park in Anchorage, Alaska

Coordinates: 61°12′19.93″N 149°52′37.62″W

Mulcahy Stadium is a 3,500-capacity baseball park in Anchorage, Alaska. Opened in 1963, although the grass of the playing surface was seeded in 1962, it is home to two teams of the Alaska Baseball League: the Anchorage Glacier Pilots and Anchorage Bucs. In addition to the Glacier Pilots and Bucs, high school and American Legion games are played at Mulcahy.

== About ==
The ballpark is named after former Alaska Railroad station auditor assistant William Mulcahy. It is located west of the Sullivan Arena across a parking lot. It has a natural grass outfield and an infield of FieldTurf. It has one of the largest capacities of any outdoor sports facility in Alaska. In 1999, five sections of aluminum bleachers were removed so that the Bucs' 3rd base clubhouse could be built. There are two rows of seating in front of the Bucs' clubhouse containing seats that were formerly used at the Oakland–Alameda County Coliseum.

The OF dimensions are as follows, LF 325 CF 398 RF 325 backstop 60

The San Diego Chicken, the "Clown Prince of Baseball" Max Patkin and "Morganna the Kissing Bandit" have made appearances at Mulcahy.

The annual 4th of July doubleheader between the Glacier Pilots and Bucs routinely draws crowds in excess of 4,000.

On July 31, 2003, a Cessna 207 Skywagon plane carrying the pilot and three passengers made an emergency crash landing, rolling just behind the left field fence as a game between the Bucs and the Alaska Goldpanners was on at Mulcahy, and a soccer game was being played at the field behind it (Anchorage Football Stadium). Players and spectators rushed to the wreckage to help. Three aboard the plane walked away with minor injuries while one received substantial injuries.

The field received a new scoreboard, new exterior fencing, new gray box seats, and the press box and grandstand were repainted for the 2007 season. In 2008, four sections of aluminum bleachers were replaced with the Home Brew Alley expansion, a wooden multi-tiered beer garden, that was installed on the first base line. After the 2009 season, the dugouts were expanded, the bullpens were relocated out-of-play, and FieldTurf was installed in the infield and foul territory.
