= San Joaquin Delta College =

Community college in Stockton, California, US

- Former names: Stockton Junior College (1935–1948); Stockton College (1948–1963)
- Type: Public community college
- Established: 1935; 91 years ago
- Accreditation: ACCJC
- Budget: $107.8 million (2020–21)
- President: Lisa Lawrenson
- Faculty: 217 (full-time); 409 (part-time)
- Students: 18,536 (2020–21)
- Location: Stockton, California, U.S. 37.995°N 121.317°W
- Campus: 175 acres (71 ha)
- Newspaper: The Collegian
- Colors: Black & gold
- Nickname: Mustangs
- Sporting affiliations: California Community College Athletic Association (CCCAA) – Big 8 Conference
- Website: www.deltacollege.edu

San Joaquin Delta College (Delta College) is a public community college in Stockton, California. It was founded in 1935 as Stockton Junior College. The college serves a district area that includes all of San Joaquin County and parts of Alameda, Calaveras, Sacramento, and Solano counties.

== History ==
Stockton Junior College began as a division of the College of the Pacific in 1935. It changed its name to Stockton College in 1948. In 1963, it became a separate community college district and changed its name to San Joaquin Delta College.

Delta College moved to a new 165-acre campus in 1972, and its previous campus reverted to the University of the Pacific.

== Academics ==
The college provides Associate of Arts degree programs as well as certificates. While the college's main campus is in Stockton, the college typically serves about 24,000 students each year from a geographic area larger than the states of Rhode Island and Delaware.

=== Mountain House satellite campus ===
In August 2009, Delta College opened a satellite campus 30 miles away in Mountain House. Known more commonly as the South Campus, it consists of 24 portable buildings, most of which serve as classrooms, as well as an administrative building and a student lounge. Mountain House also houses the Cisco Networking Academy.

== Administration ==
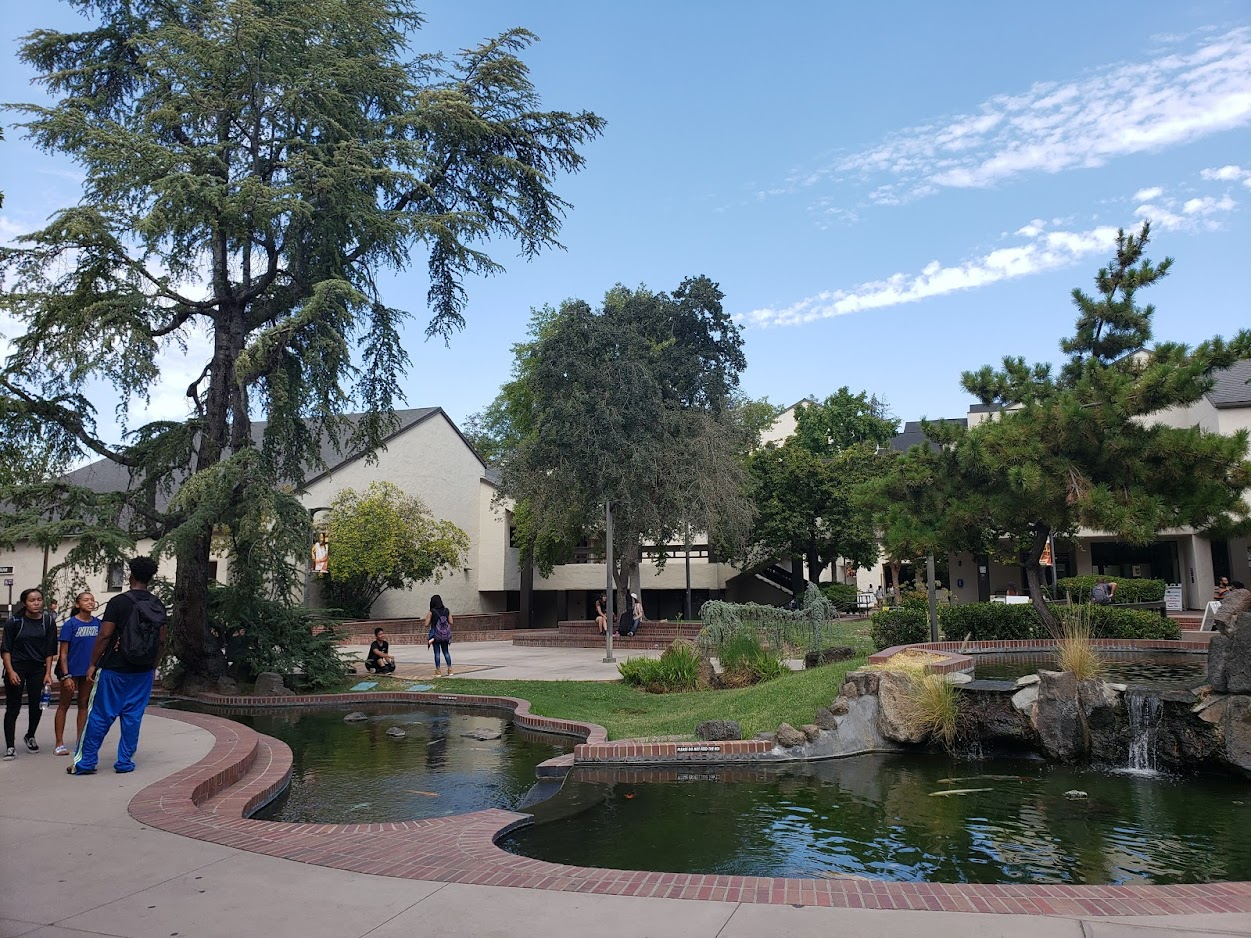
The Koi Pond located in the campus courtyard.

Lisa Aguilera Lawrenson is Delta's 12th and current president/superintendent, chosen by the board of trustees in May 2022. She served as the college's acting superintendent/president for seven months following Omid Pourzanjani's abrupt resignation in September 2021 and is the first Latina and woman of color to serve in this role.

=== Past presidents ===
Omid Pourzanjani served for two years as president from August 2019 to September 2021. On September 28, 2021, tensions between Pourzanjani and the board of trustees led to his abrupt resignation.

Kathleen Hart served as president from 2012 until her retirement in 2019. She led the college to successful reaccreditation in 2014.

Jeffrey Marsee was the president at College of the Redwoods in Eureka, California for three years before coming to Delta. By January 2012, the faculty had conducted a vote of "no confidence" against Marsee. Eventually, Marsee was placed on leave in February, officially tendered his resignation, and college trustees voted to release him from his contract on March 2, 2012. Marsee had been a very controversial figure at Redwoods as well, and was noted as having a history of causing campus turmoil.

Susan Cota, the former chancellor of the Chabot–Las Positas Community College District, served as Interim President from August 2010 to May 2011.

Raul Rodriguez served as president from July 2002 to August 2010. He left to become the chancellor of the Rancho Santiago Community College District in Santa Ana.

Ed Gould served as president from February 2000 to December 2001.

== Arts ==
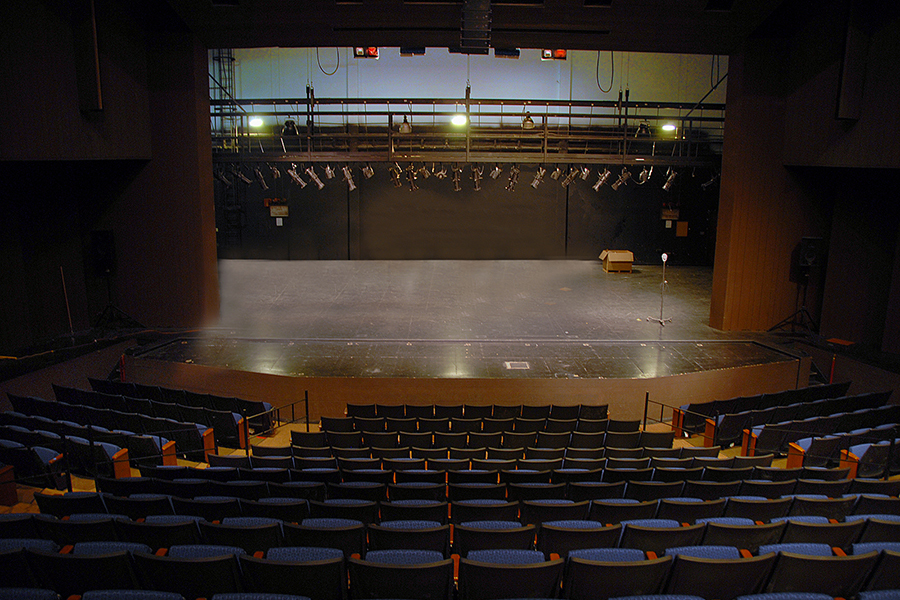
The 393-seat Tillie Lewis Theater hosts Delta's Drama and Dance productions.

The Stockton Campus is home to three performance venues---the 393-seat Tillie Lewis Theater; the larger 1,428-seat Warren Atherton Auditorium where concerts are hosted; and the 128-seat Alfred H. Muller Studio Theatre, a black box theatre with removable seating that allows for a variety of staging configurations. Notable musical events held in the Atherton include the Delta Jazz Festival and the Choral Festival, both held annually since 1998 and 2011, respectively. The Stockton Symphony also houses all of its performances at the Atherton Auditorium.

The Visual Arts Department displays exhibits in the LH Horton Jr Gallery on campus. Six exhibitions are presented annually: three juried exhibitions (ceramics, painting & sculpture, and photography), biennial faculty and alumni shows, a thematic small group show, and an annual student art show. Gallery admission is free and open to the public.

== Athletics ==
San Joaquin Delta fields 13 sports across ten men's and ten women's teams, competing in the CCCAA as members of the Big 8 Conference. Baseball is their most successful sport to date, with three State Championship titles in 1959, 2011, and 2018. Their most recent state title has been in women's basketball in 2026.

=== Baseball ===
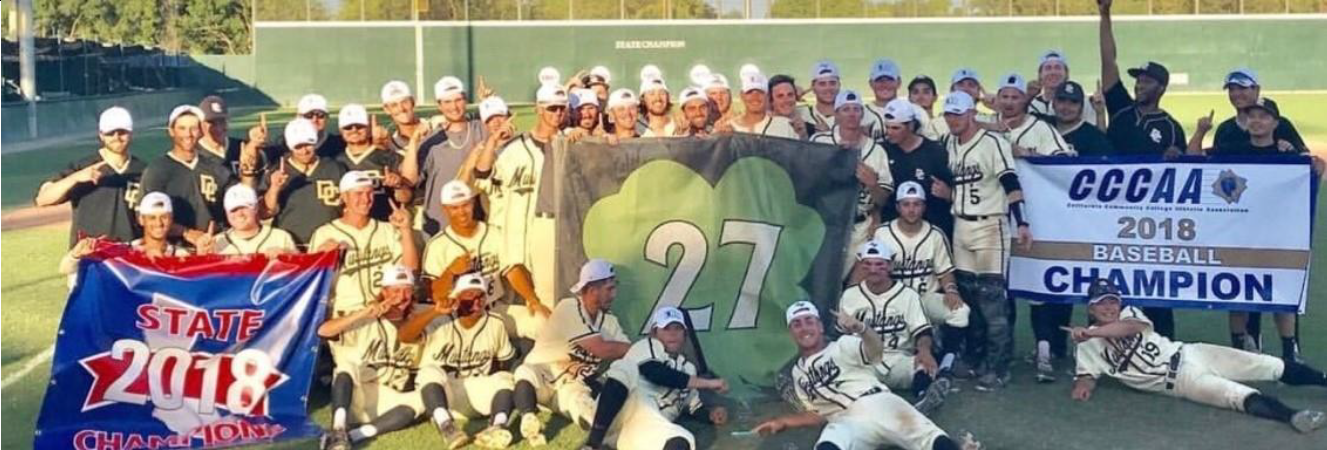
The 2018 CCCAA Baseball State Champions.

Pat Doyle was head baseball coach from 1976 to 2006 after a short career as a minor leaguer in the Boston Red Sox organization in 1966–67. He later was global coordinator for Major League Baseball's envoy program, coached the Anchorage Glacier Pilots in 1990 and 1991, coached Team USA in the 1994 Baseball World Cup, managed the British national team in the 2010 European Championship, and guided Team Israel in the 2011 European Championship Qualifiers. He is a member of the Stockton Athletic Hall of Fame, the Lodi Athletic Hall of Fame, and the California Community College Baseball Coaches Association (CCCBCA) Hall of Fame. He is a former president of the CCCBCA, which established the Doyle Scholarship in his honor.

Reed Peters took over as head baseball coach in 2008 and has established the Mustangs as one of the top-performing baseball programs in the state. In his fourteen seasons as head coach, the Mustangs have reached the CCCAA Elite Eight nine times and the Final Four seven times, with two State Championship wins in 2011 and 2018. They were also State Runner-up in 2009, 2014, and 2015. Since 2008, 27 Delta baseball alumni have gone on to play professionally in Major League Baseball. Reed Peters has been named Northern California Coach of the year twice and the ABCA National Coach of the Year in 2018.

=== Women's basketball ===
San Joaquin Delta's women's basketball has also seen consistent success at the state level. Under head coach Gina Johnson, the Lady Mustangs have reached the CCCAA Elite Eight 14 times, the Final Four eight times, and the Championship game four times. On March 13, 2022, the Mustangs reached the CCCAA State Championship game for the third time after overcoming a 17-point deficit with less than seven minutes remaining in the semi-final match against Irvine Valley College. They eventually lost the championship title game, 76–71, to neighboring Big 8 rival Sierra College.

On March 15, 2026, the Lady Mustangs overcame a historic 24-point deficit in their fourth championship game, defeating MiraCosta College 76-71 to clinch their first-ever state championship title in women's basketball.

== Media ==
- 93.5 FM, KWDC, Delta College Radio (24/7 student and faculty programming)
- The Collegian, Delta College Newspaper
- DCTV on Demand, Digital Media Library

== Notable alumni ==
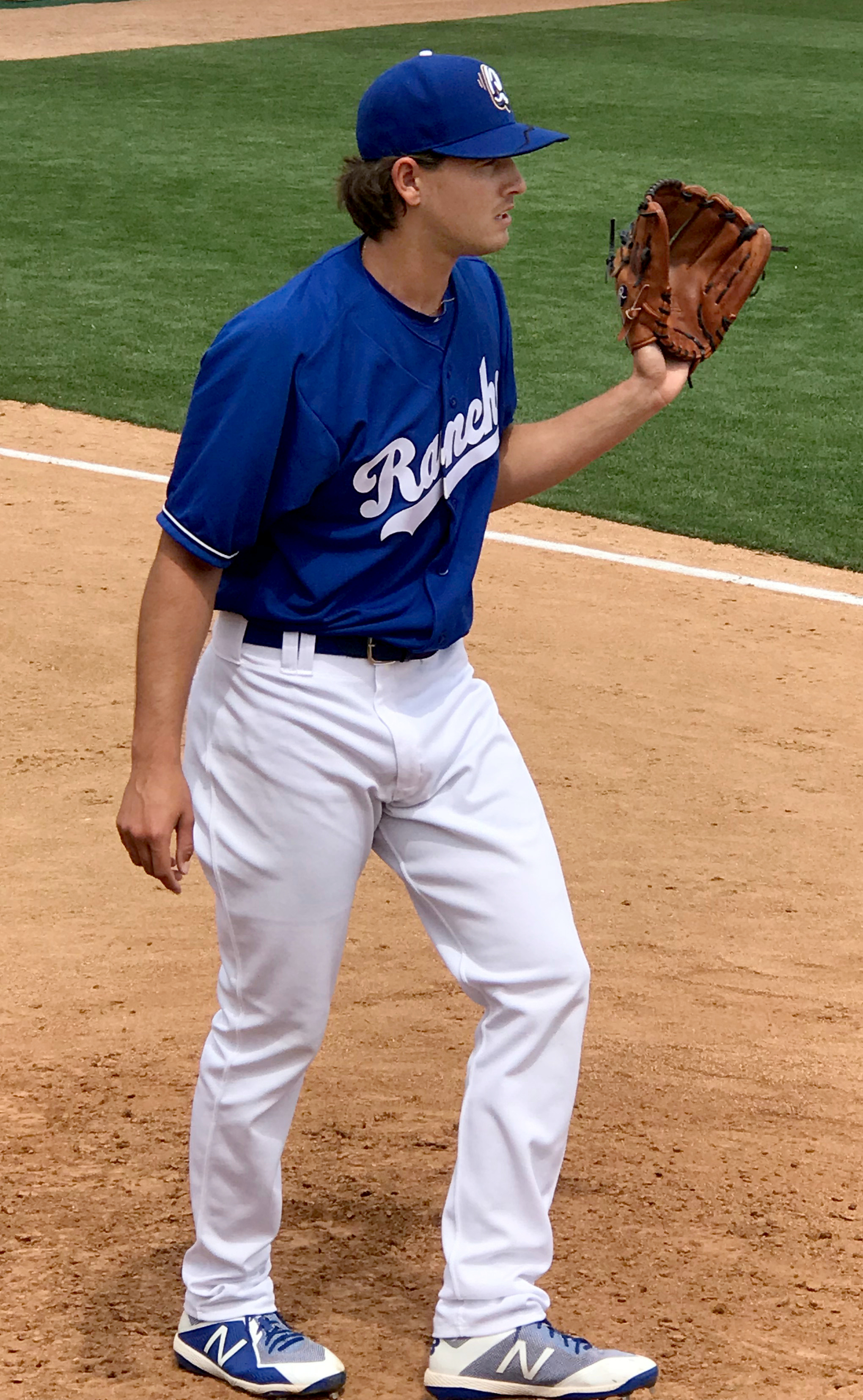
Dean Kremer

- Scott Brooks (born 1965) – professional basketball coach, currently head coach of the Washington Wizards, and former professional basketball player
- Phil Coke (born 1982) — MLB pitcher for the Detroit Tigers
- Viola Frey (1933–2004) — artist
- Robert Gaughran (born 1935) – member of the USA Water Polo Hall of Fame
- Bob Heinz (born 1947) — former NFL football player for the Miami Dolphins and Washington Redskins
- Dolores Huerta (1930–2026) — labor leader and civil rights activist
- Chris Isaak (born 1956) — rock musician and occasional actor
- Dean Kremer (born 1996) – Israeli-American baseball starting pitcher for the Baltimore Orioles
- John Nisby (1936–2011) — former NFL guard with Pittsburgh Steelers and Washington Redskins
- Patrick Edward Purdy (1964 – 1989) — shooter at the 1989 Cleveland Elementary School shooting (Stockton)
- Bill Sandeman (born 1942) — former NFL football player for the Atlanta Falcons
- Norman D. Shumway (1934–2022) — former U.S. Representative from California
- Joel Stallworth (born 1983) — American sprinter, 2008 World Indoor track and field champion
