= Coral Seymour Memorial Ballpark =

Baseball park in Kenai, Alaska, U.S.

Coral Seymour Ballpark
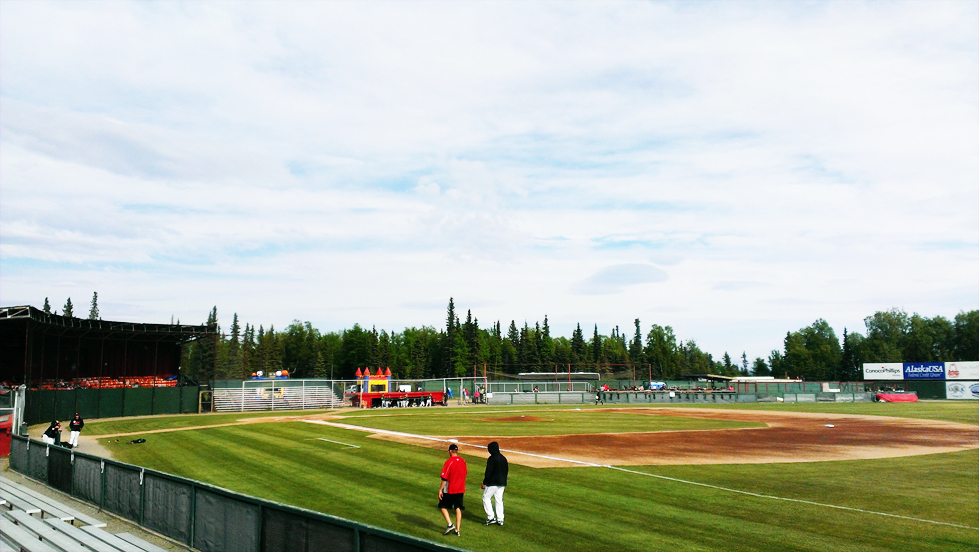
- Interactive map of Coral Seymour Ballpark
- Full name: Coral Seymour Memorial Ballpark
- Former names: Oiler Park
- Location: 103 South Tinker Lane, Kenai, Alaska 99611
- Coordinates: 60°33′32″N 151°12′09″W
- Capacity: 1,300

Construction
- Built: 1976
- Renovated: 1998

Tenant
- Peninsula Oilers (ABL)

Coral Seymour Memorial Ballpark is a 1,300-seat baseball park in Kenai in the U.S. state of Alaska. It is home to the Peninsula Oilers of the Alaska Baseball League. It was constructed in 1976, and remodeled in 1998. It was formerly known as Oiler Park before being renamed in honor of Coral Seymour, a vital figure in the early history of the Oilers. It is surrounded by spruce trees. It has a natural grass playing field.

In a rarity to baseball stadiums, it contains heat fans in the ceiling of the grandstand.
