= Western Baseball Association (1967–72) =

1967–72 collegiate summer baseball league

- Formerly: Big West Conference (1970–1972)
- League: National Baseball Congress
- Classification: Collegiate summer baseball
- Sport: Baseball
- Founded: 1967
- Folded: 1972
- No. of teams: 5 (at ceasing of operations)
- Country: United States

The Western Baseball Association was a collegiate summer baseball league founded in 1967, and later known as the Big West Conference, was composed of teams from across the Pacific Northwest. The WBA, along with the Cape Cod League, was one of the first summer collegiate baseball leagues to be officially certified and supported by the NCAA in 1968 as a part of what is now called the National Alliance of College Summer Baseball, and is the direct predecessor to the well known Alaska Baseball League. The original WBA ceased operation at the end of the 1972 season to make way for the ABL. The league was reformed in 1983 by the Humboldt Crabs, the only original WBA team in the new WBA, and played through the 2000 season.

== Western Baseball Association (1967–69) ==
In 1967, the original league members were the Humboldt Crabs, Alaska Goldpanners, Grand Junction Eagles, Fallon Silver Circle/Nevada Copper Kings, Bellingham Bells, San Rafael Braves, Santa Rosa Rosebuds, and Mendocino Braves. The league president was Grand Junction manager Sam Suplizio and John L. Carbray served as league commissioner. Before the 1968 season, the Goldpanners, Nevada Copper Kings, and Mendocino Braves left the league and were replaced by the Yakima Indians and Milton-Freewater Twins. Before the 1969 season, Santa Rosa and San Rafael dropped out and the league added a team in Springfield Bulldogs.

== Big West Conference (1970–72) ==
The WBA was reorganized, a new commissioner and board of directors were announced and the league was renamed the Big West Conference before the 1970 season. As a part of the reorganization, the Alaska Goldpanners rejoined the league along with the newly established Anchorage Glacier Pilots, while Milton-Freewater and Yakima dropped out. For the 1971 season, the league petitioned for funding from Major League Baseball and multiple games between Anchorage and Humboldt were broadcast on television.

While Bellingham, Grand Junction and Humboldt still played each other in 1972, the league was no longer official, and records were no longer kept. In 1974, the Glacier Pilots and Goldpanners formed the now famous Alaska Baseball League.

== Champions ==
- 1967 Humboldt Crabs
- 1968 Humboldt Crabs
- 1969 Humboldt Crabs
- 1970 Alaska Goldpanners and Anchorage Glacier Pilots (co-champions)
- 1971 Anchorage Glacier Pilots^

^also won the NBC World Series

== WBA/BWC teams (1967–1972) ==
- Alaska Goldpanners (1967, 1970–71)
- Humboldt Crabs (1967–71)
- Anchorage Glacier Pilots (1970–71)
- Fallon Silver Circle/Nevada Copper Kings (1967)
- Santa Rosa Rosebuds (1967–68)
- Bellingham Bells (1967–71)
- Grand Junction Eagles (1967–71)
- Litchfield's San Rafael Braves (1967–68)
- Milton-Freewater Twins (1968–69)
- Yakima Valley Indians (1968–69)
- Pitchford Mack Springfield Bulldogs (1969)
- Mendocino Braves (1967)

== Western Baseball Association (1983–2000) ==
In August 1982, the Humboldt Crabs hosted the inaugural WBA West of the Rockies Tournament to help showcase teams that would join the newly reestablished Western Baseball Association in 1983. This iteration of the WBA, which played through the 2000 season, consisted mostly of teams from Northern California and Southern Oregon. The Sacramento Smokeys were the only team to play in every season of the reorganized WBA. Original members Fontanetti's Athletics and Humboldt Crabs played every year until 1997 and 1996 respectively. Other longtime members included the Seaside Bombers, Hollister Angels, San Francisco Senators, San Francisco Seals, San Jose Raiders and San Mateo Bulldogs.

== See also ==
- Alaska Baseball League
