= Stockton Symphony =

American orchestra

- Orchestra
- Founded: 1926
- Concert hall: Atherton Auditorium, San Joaquin Delta College
- Principal conductor: Peter Jaffe
- Website: www.stocktonsymphony.org

The Stockton Symphony Association is an American orchestra based in Stockton, California. It was founded in 1926 by Manlio Silva and is the third oldest orchestra in California. Since 1995 Peter Jaffe has been music director and conductor.

== Concert halls ==
The symphony performs at the Atherton Auditorium of San Joaquin Delta College in Stockton, California.
