= Chugiak-Eagle River Chinooks =

Baseball club in Alaska, US

- Logo

Information
- League: Alaska Baseball League
- Location: Chugiak, Alaska
- Ballpark: Loretta French Park (Capacity: 600)
- League championships: 2007
- Former name: AIA Fire
- Colors: Red and blue
- President: Chris Beck
- Website: https://cerchinooks.com/

The Chugiak-Eagle River Chinooks are a college summer baseball club in the Alaska Baseball League (ABL). The Chinooks are based in Chugiak, Alaska, United States. The team is operated by Athletes in Action. They won their first ABL Championship in 2007. Until 2010 the team was based out of Fairbanks under the name AIA Fire. The team relocated to Chugiak in 2011.

== Notable alumni ==
- Josh Donaldson
- Kirk Nieuwenhuis
- Conner Menez
