= Grand Junction Eagles =

Collegiate summer baseball team

Information
- League: National Baseball Congress (Summer Collegiate)
- Location: Grand Junction, Colorado
- Ballpark: Suplizio Field
- Founded: 1948
- Folded: 1980
- Former league(s): Western Baseball Association (1967-69); Big West Conference (1970-72)
- Former ballpark: Lincoln Park Stadium (1949-1980)

The Grand Junction Eagles were a collegiate summer baseball team located in Grand Junction, Colorado, founded in 1948, originally sponsored by Eagles Lodge No. 595. The Eagles played many of the best semi-pro teams including the Humboldt Crabs, Alaska Goldpanners, and Anchorage Glacier Pilots, and had multiple appearances in the National Baseball Congress World Series. The Grand Junction Eagles played their last season in 1980. in 1964, the Eagles became the second non-Alaska team to play in the Midnight Sun Game.

== Notable alumni ==
Tippy Martinez (1972), Eric Wilkins, Paul Molitor, Bob Welch, Jim Sundberg, Randy Ready, Bill Evans, Max Alvis, Craig Morton, and Rick Miller.
