= Pat Doyle (baseball) =

American baseball player and coach

- Coach
- Born: April 15, 1944 (age 82); Santa Monica, California, U.S.

John Patrick Doyle (born April 15, 1944) is an American baseball coach. He coached third base for Team Israel at the 2017 World Baseball Classic in March 2017 in South Korea and Japan.

== Early and personal life ==
Doyle was born in Santa Monica, California, and is a native of West Los Angeles, California. He played baseball at University High School in West Los Angeles.

Doyle and his wife, Harriet, live in Morada, California. They have three children (Amy Gad, married to Zaki, Kerry, and Tim, married to Summer), and 4 grandchildren, Kevin (20), Jenna (11), Nixon (7) and Olivia (2).

== College ==
He played baseball at Los Angeles Valley College as a pitcher for the Monarchs. He was then a scholarship player at Fresno State from 1964 to 1966 (B.A.; Social Science; January 1967). A right-handed pitcher for the Fresno State Bulldogs baseball team, he holds the school record for the second-lowest season ERA at 1.31, with a 7–0 record at Fresno State in his junior year.

He received an M.A. in Health and Safety Studies from CSU Sacramento in 1982.

== Baseball playing and coaching career ==
Doyle was a minor league pitcher in the Boston Red Sox organization in 1966–67. He then played seven years for the Lodi Guild Winemasters, a former semi-pro team.

Doyle started coaching at Lodi High School, coaching the freshman-sophomore baseball team and freshmen football team from 1969 to 1972. He became the head coach of the baseball team at Tokay High School in Lodi when it opened in 1972, and the team won its first league title that year. He coached the Tigers until 1976, winning two titles in three years.

Doyle became the assistant baseball coach at San Joaquin Delta College in 1976, became the head coach the next year, and remained the head coach through 2000. In 23 seasons he led the team to the playoffs 17 times, while compiling a 568–274 win–loss record. He also taught health education, sports psychology, and fitness.

He later was the manager of the Anchorage Glacier Pilots in 1990 and 1991, was an assistant coach for Team USA in the 1994 Baseball World Cup, was the head coach of the 1996 Republic of Ireland National team, managed the British national team in the 2010 European Baseball Championship, and was head coach of Team Israel in the 2011 European Baseball Championship Qualifiers.

He also worked as consultant, coach, and envoy for Major League Baseball International, and coordinated the now-defunct MLB Envoy Coach Program, from 1993 to 2011. He helped build baseball fields and coaching programs and worked with players and coaches in North America, Europe, Asia, and Africa.

Doyle is a member of the American Baseball Coaches Hall of Fame, the Stockton Athletic Hall of Fame, the Lodi Athletic Hall of Fame, the California Community College Baseball Coaches Association (CCCBCA) Hall of Fame, and the Anchorage Glacier Pilot Hall of Fame. He has also been a recipient of the National Baseball Congress Coach of the Year Award (1991) and the European Baseball Coaches Association Coaching Achievement Award. He is a former president of the CCCBCA (1999–2006), which established the Doyle Scholarship in his honor.

He serves on the board of directors for Play Global!, which spreads baseball throughout the world.

=== Minor league managing career ===
- Anchorage Glacier Pilots (1990, 1991)

== World Baseball Classic; Team Israel ==
Doyle coached third base for Team Israel at the 2017 World Baseball Classic in March 2017 in South Korea and Japan.
