= Dave Winfield =

American baseball player (born 1951)

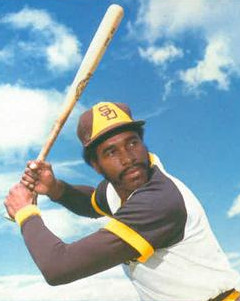
- Winfield with the San Diego Padres in 1978
- Right fielder
- Born: October 3, 1951 (age 74); Saint Paul, Minnesota, U.S.
- Batted: Right Threw: Right

MLB debut
- June 19, 1973, for the San Diego Padres

Last MLB appearance
- October 1, 1995, for the Cleveland Indians

MLB statistics
- Batting average: .283
- Hits: 3,110
- Home runs: 465
- Runs batted in: 1,833
- Stats at Baseball Reference

Teams
- San Diego Padres (1973–1980); New York Yankees (1981–1988, 1990); California Angels (1990–1991); Toronto Blue Jays (1992); Minnesota Twins (1993–1994); Cleveland Indians (1995)

Career highlights and awards
- 12× All-Star (1977–1988); World Series champion (1992); 7× Gold Glove Award (1979, 1980, 1982–1985, 1987); 6× Silver Slugger Award (1981–1985, 1992); Roberto Clemente Award (1994); NL RBI leader (1979); San Diego Padres No. 31 retired; San Diego Padres Hall of Fame

Member of the National

Baseball Hall of Fame
- Induction: 2001
- Vote: 84.5% (first ballot)

David Mark Winfield (born October 3, 1951) is an American former Major League Baseball (MLB) right fielder. He is the special assistant to the executive director of the Major League Baseball Players Association. Over his 22-year career, he played for six teams: the San Diego Padres, New York Yankees, California Angels, Toronto Blue Jays, Minnesota Twins, and Cleveland Indians. He had the winning hit in the 1992 World Series with the Blue Jays over the Atlanta Braves.

Winfield is a 12-time MLB All-Star, a seven-time Gold Glove Award winner, and a six-time Silver Slugger Award winner. The Padres retired Winfield's No. 31 in his honor. He also wore No. 31 while playing for the Yankees and Indians and wore No. 32 with the Angels, Blue Jays and Twins. In 2004, ESPN named him the third-best all-around athlete of all time in any sport. He was inducted into the Baseball Hall of Fame in 2001 in his first year of eligibility, and was an inaugural inductee into the College Baseball Hall of Fame in 2006.

== Early life ==
David Mark Winfield was born on October 3, 1951, in Saint Paul, Minnesota, and grew up in the city's Rondo neighborhood. His parents divorced when he was three years old, leaving him and his older brother Stephen to be raised by their mother, Arline, and a large extended family of aunts, uncles, grandparents, and cousins. The Winfield brothers honed their athletic skills in Saint Paul's Oxford Field, where coach Bill Peterson was one of the first to notice Winfield. Winfield did not reach his full height of 6 ft 6 in (1.98 m) until his senior year at Saint Paul Central High School.

== College career ==
Winfield earned a full baseball scholarship to the University of Minnesota in 1969, where he starred in baseball and basketball for the Minnesota Golden Gophers. Winfield's 1971–72 Minnesota team won a Big Ten Conference basketball championship, the school's first outright championship in 53 years. During the 1972–73 basketball season, he was involved in a brawl when Ohio State played at Minnesota. Winfield also played college summer baseball for the Alaska Goldpanners of Fairbanks for two seasons (1971–72) and was the MVP in 1972. In 1973, he was named All-American and voted MVP of the College World Series, as a pitcher.

Following college, Winfield was drafted by four teams in three different sports in 1973. The San Diego Padres selected him as a pitcher with the fourth overall pick in the MLB draft. Winfield was also drafted by the Atlanta Hawks in the 5th round of the NBA draft and by the Utah Stars in the 6th round of the ABA Draft. Though he never played college football, the Minnesota Vikings selected Winfield in the 17th round of the NFL draft. He is one of five players ever to be drafted by three professional sports (the others being George Carter, Noel Jenke, Mickey McCarty and Dave Logan) and one of three athletes, along with Carter and McCarty, to be drafted by four leagues.

== Professional career ==
=== San Diego Padres (1973–1980) ===
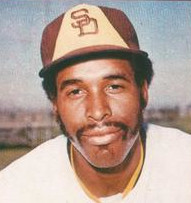
Winfield with the San Diego Padres, c. 1977

Winfield chose baseball; the San Diego Padres selected him in the first round, with the fourth overall selection, of the 1973 MLB draft. Winfield signed with the Padres, who promoted him directly to the major leagues. Although he was a pitcher, the Padres wanted his powerful bat in the lineup and put him in right field, where he could still use his powerful arm. He batted.277 in 56 games for his first season.

The next three seasons saw gradual improvement: he had his first 20-HR season in 1974 while batting.265 in 145 games that had him play mostly in left field. The following year saw him shifted to right field, where he would play most of the next six seasons. By the time of his fourth season being over, his best average in the majors was.283 (1976). Over the next several years, he developed into an All-Star player in San Diego, gradually increasing his ability to hit for both power and average. In 1977, he had his first All-Star season, doing so while batting.275 in 157 games with 25 home runs. He would be an All-Star every year until 1988. In 1978, he was named team captain. That year, he finished 10th in MVP voting and had his first.300 season with a.308 year in 158 games. He had his first 100-RBI season the following year while batting.308 with a league-leading 118 RBIs to go with 24 intentional walks; he had his first season with more walks (85) than strikeouts (71). He won a Gold Glove and finished 3rd in the MVP voting. In his final season with the Padres in 1980, he played in all 162 games for the only time and batted.276 to go with 20 home runs and a Gold Glove victory.

=== New York Yankees (1981–1990) ===
In December 1980, New York Yankees owner George Steinbrenner made Winfield the game's highest-paid player by signing him to a ten-year, $23 million contract (equivalent to $89.9 million in 2025). Steinbrenner mistakenly thought he was signing Winfield for $16 million, unaware of the meaning of a cost-of-living clause in the contract, a misunderstanding that led to an infamous public feud. The $2.3 million annual average value of the contract set a record. He more than doubled the previous record set when Nolan Ryan signed with the Houston Astros in 1979.

Winfield was among the highest-rated players in the game throughout his Yankee contract. He was a key factor in leading the Yankees to the 1981 American League pennant. In the 1981 American League Division Series, Winfield batted.350 with two doubles and a triple and made some important defensive plays helping the Yankees to victory over the Milwaukee Brewers. Unfortunately, Winfield had a sub-par World Series, which the Yankees lost to the Los Angeles Dodgers in six games. After getting his only series hit, Winfield jokingly asked for the ball. Steinbrenner did not find this humorous, and criticized Winfield at the end of the series. Many commentators have since noted that Winfield's postseason doldrums were somewhat overstated when compared to those of his teammates. Four of his seven hits came in games won by the Yankees. The team's offense for the most part was inconsistent, and they were also set back by key injuries to Reggie Jackson and Graig Nettles, who each only played three games with one combined RBI (the same as Winfield).

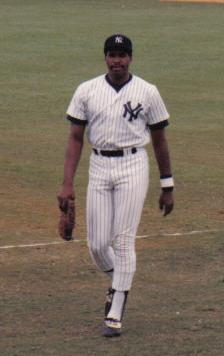
Winfield with the New York Yankees in 1983

Winfield did not let Steinbrenner's comments affect his play. He hit 37 home runs during the 1982 season.

On August 4, 1983, Winfield killed a seagull by throwing a ball while warming up before the fifth inning of a game at Toronto's Exhibition Stadium. Fans responded by hurling obscenities and objects onto the field. After the game, he was brought to a nearby Metropolitan Toronto Police station and charged with cruelty to animals. He was released after posting a $500 bond. Yankee manager Billy Martin quipped, "It's the first time he's hit the cutoff man all season." Charges were dropped the following day. As Winfield missed the Yankees team bus to Hamilton that night to catch their flight home, he was driven to Hamilton personally by Blue Jays general manager Pat Gillick. In the offseason, Winfield returned to Toronto and donated two paintings for an Easter Seals auction, which raised over $60,000. For years afterward, Winfield's appearances in Toronto were greeted by fans standing and flapping their arms.

From 1981 through 1984, Winfield was the most effective run producer in MLB. In 1984, he and teammate Don Mattingly were in a race for the batting title in which Mattingly won out by .003 points on the last day of the season; Winfield finished with a .340 average. In the last few weeks of the race, it became obvious to most observers that the fans were partial to Mattingly. Winfield took this in stride, noting that a similar thing happened in 1961 when Mantle and Maris competed for the single season home run record.

In 1985, Steinbrenner derided Winfield by saying to The New York Times writer Murray Chass, "Where is Reggie Jackson? We need a Mr. October or a Mr. September. Winfield is Mr. May." This criticism has become somewhat of an anachronism as many cite the statement to Steinbrenner after the 1981 World Series. Winfield was struggling while the Yankees eventually lost the division title to Toronto on the second to last day of the season. The "Mr. May" sobriquet lived with Winfield until he won the 1992 World Series with Toronto.

Throughout the late 1980s, Steinbrenner regularly leaked derogatory and fictitious stories about Winfield to the press. He also forced Yankee managers to move him down in the batting order and bench him. Steinbrenner frequently tried to trade him, but Winfield's status as a 10-and-5 player (10 years in the majors, five years with a single team) meant he could not be traded without his consent. Winfield continued to put up excellent numbers with the Yankees, driving in 744 runs between 1982 and 1988, and was selected to play in the All-Star Game every season. Winfield won five (of his seven) Gold Glove Awards for his stellar outfield play as a Yankee.

In 1989, Winfield missed the entire season due to a back injury. 1990 was the last year of his contract with the Yankees, but the troubles with Steinbrenner in his feud with Winfield continued to escalate. He had a rusty spring training before being relegated from the field to being the designated hitter. Further troubles led to being just the DH against left-handed pitchers. On May 11, manager Bucky Dent and general manager Pete Peterson met in a room with the intent of stating a trade of Winfield for Mike Witt of the California Angels. Winfield stepped in the room and stated his refusal to be traded; the argument over whether his 10-and-5 rights overrode his list of having the Angels on his trade list failed to meet at an impasse when Angels owner Gene Autry came in with a three-year extension. He proceeded to hit 19 home runs in 112 games for the Angels in the remainder of the 1990 season. As for Steinbrenner, he attempted to curry favor by stating to Winfield that he would welcome back Winfield openly if he had won the arbitration case; by this point in the month of May, he was already under investigation by commissioner Fay Vincent for his apparent connections to Howard Spira, a known gambler with supposed Mafia connections, whom he had paid $40,000 for embarrassing information on Winfield. A month later, the team received a fine that required them to pay money to the league and the Angels for tampering and Steinbrenner soon received a lifetime ban. However, the suspension lasted only two years.

=== California Angels (1990–1991) ===
Winfield was traded for Mike Witt during the 1990 season and won The Sporting News Comeback Player of the Year Award. He hit for the cycle in June 1991 against the Kansas City Royals, hitting 5-for-5 in the game. He also recorded his 400th home run against the Twins in his hometown.

=== Toronto Blue Jays (1992) ===
Winfield was still a productive hitter after his 40th birthday. On December 19, 1991, he signed with the Toronto Blue Jays as their designated hitter, and also made "Winfieldian" plays when he periodically took his familiar position in right field. He batted .290 with 26 home runs and 108 RBI during the 1992 season.

Winfield proved to be a lightning rod for the Blue Jays, providing leadership and experience as well as his potent bat. Winfield was a fan favorite and also demanded fan participation. In August, he made an impassioned plea to the reserved fans during an interview for more crowd noise. The phrase "Winfield Wants Noise" became a popular slogan for the rest of the season, appearing on T-shirts, dolls, buttons, and signs.

The Blue Jays won the pennant, giving Winfield a chance at redemption for his previous post-season futility. In Game 6 of the World Series, he became "Mr. Jay" as he delivered the game-winning two-run double in the 11th inning off Atlanta's Charlie Leibrandt to win the World Series Championship for Toronto. At 41 years of age, Winfield became the third-oldest player to hit an extra base hit in the World Series, trailing only Pete Rose and Enos Slaughter.

=== Minnesota Twins (1993–1994) ===
After the 1992 season, Winfield elected free agency and signed with his hometown Minnesota Twins. In 1993, he batted .271 with 21 home runs, appearing in 143 games for the 1993 Twins, mostly as their designated hitter. On September 16, at age 41, he collected his 3,000th career hit with a single off Oakland Athletics closer Dennis Eckersley.

During the 1994 baseball strike, which began on August 12, Winfield was traded to the Cleveland Indians at the trade waiver deadline on August 31 for a player to be named later. The 1994 season had been halted two weeks earlier (it was eventually canceled a month later on September 14), so Winfield did not get to play for the Indians that year and no player was ever named in exchange. To settle the trade, Cleveland and Minnesota executives went to dinner, with the Indians picking up the tab. This makes Winfield the only player in major league history to be "traded" for a dinner (although official sources list the transaction as Winfield having been sold by the Twins to the Indians).

=== Cleveland Indians (1995) ===
Winfield, who was the oldest player in MLB at the time, again elected free agency in October but re-signed with the Indians as spring training began in April 1995. A rotator cuff injury kept him on the disabled list for most of the season, thus he played in only 46 games and hit .191 for Cleveland's first pennant winner in 41 years. He did not participate in the Indians' postseason.

=== Honors and awards ===
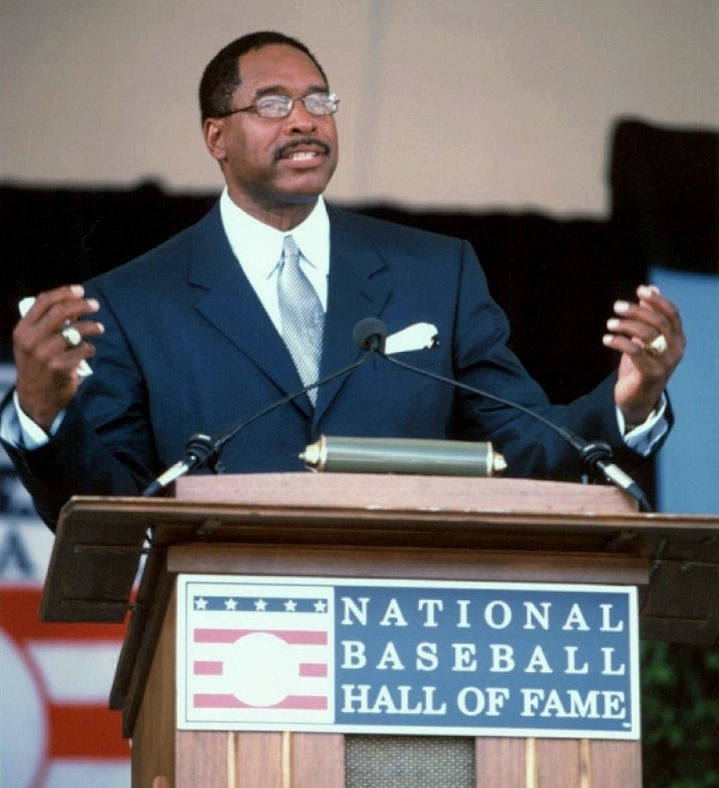
Winfield at his Hall of Fame induction in 2001

Winfield retired in 1996. In his first year of eligibility, he was inducted into the Baseball Hall of Fame in 2001 as a San Diego Padre, the first Padre to be so honored. The move reportedly irked Yankees' owner George Steinbrenner, however Winfield sounded a conciliatory note toward him, saying, "He's said he regrets a lot of things that happened. We're fine now. Things have changed."

In 1998, Winfield was inducted by the San Diego Hall of Champions into the Breitbard Hall of Fame, honoring San Diego's finest athletes both on and off the playing surface.

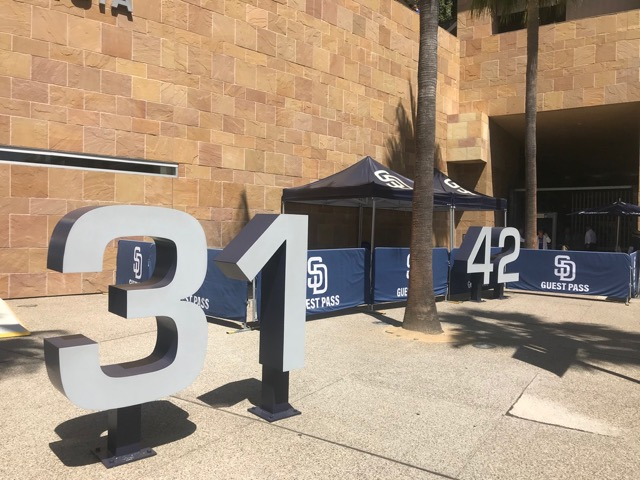
Winfield's No. 31, retired by the Padres, displayed at Petco Park

In 1999, Winfield ranked number 94 on The Sporting News list of Baseball's Greatest Players and was a nominee for the Major League Baseball All-Century Team.

He was inducted into the San Diego Padres Hall of Fame in 2000. The Padres retired Winfield's No. 31 on April 14, 2001.

On July 4, 2006, Winfield was inducted into the College Baseball Hall of Fame in its inaugural class.

In 2010, Winfield was selected as one of 28 members of the NCAA Men's College World Series Legends Team.

The Big Ten Network named Winfield its #15 ranked Big Ten Conference "Icon" in 2010.

The 2016 MLB All-Star Game, played at Petco Park in San Diego, was dedicated to Winfield. He had represented the Padres at the first All-Star Game to be played in San Diego.

On June 21, 2024, Winfield returned to Fairbanks for the unveiling of a bronze statue near Growden Park, where he had played for the Alaska Goldpanners of Fairbanks. Winfield also threw out the ceremonial first pitch for the annual Midnight Sun Game.

== Post-playing career and appearances ==
In 1996, Winfield joined the new Major League Baseball on Fox program as studio analyst for their Saturday MLB coverage.

From 2001 to 2013, Winfield served as executive vice president/senior advisor of the San Diego Padres.

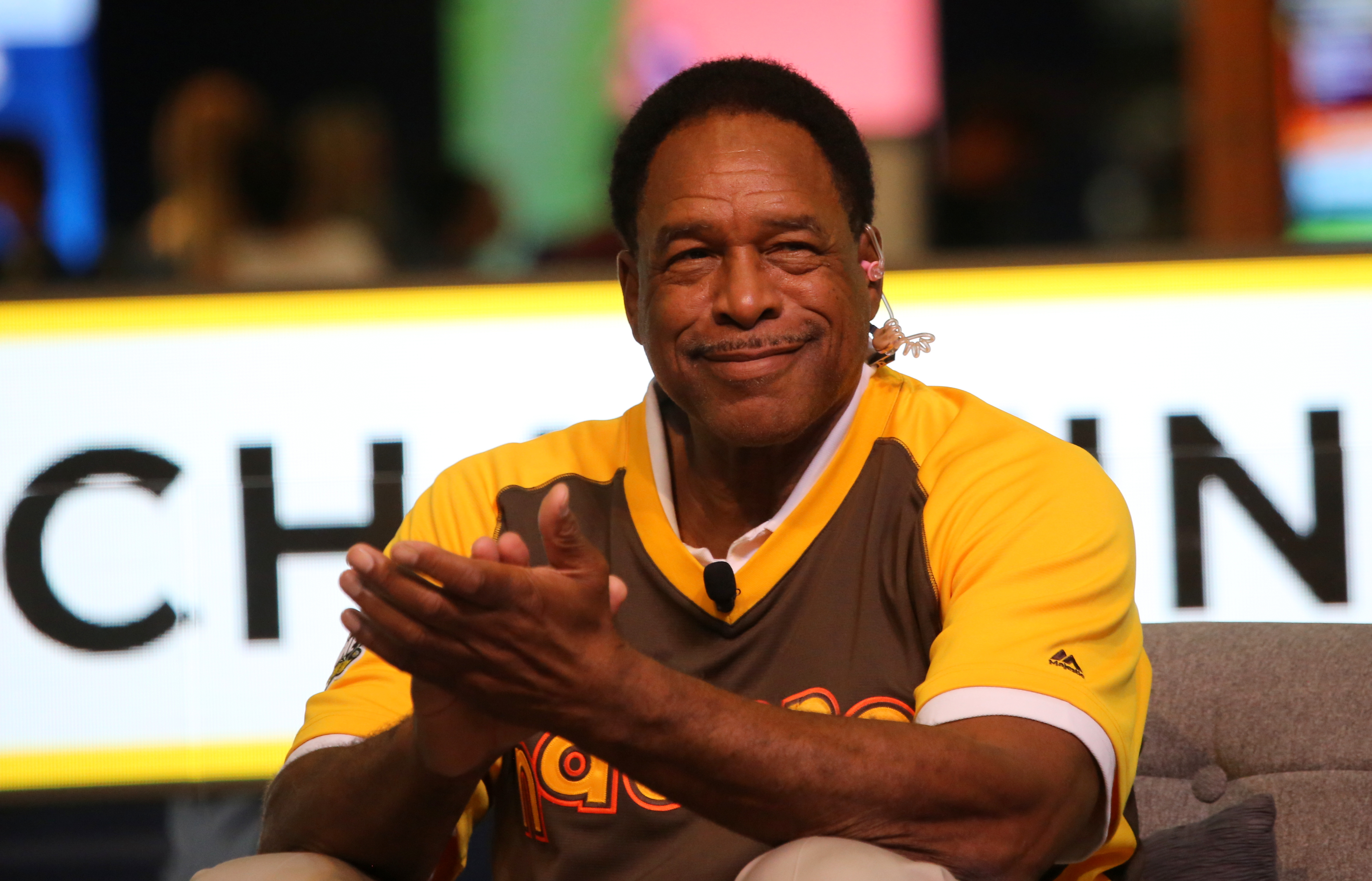
Dave Winfield at Petco Park in 2016

In 2006, Winfield teamed up with conductor Bob Thompson to create The Baseball Music Project, a series of concerts that celebrate the history of baseball, with Winfield serving as host and narrator.

In 2008, Winfield participated in both the final Old Timers' Day ceremony and final game ceremony at Yankee Stadium.

On June 5, 2008, Major League Baseball held a special draft of the surviving Negro league players to acknowledge and rectify their exclusion from the major leagues on the basis of race. The idea of the special draft was conceived by Winfield. Each major league team drafted one player from the Negro leagues.

On March 31, 2009, Winfield joined ESPN as an analyst on their Baseball Tonight program.

On December 5, 2013, Winfield was named special assistant to Executive Director Tony Clark at the Major League Baseball Players Association.

On July 14, 2014, Winfield returned to Minnesota to throw out the first pitch at the 2014 Home Run Derby along with fellow St. Paul natives Joe Mauer, Paul Molitor, and Jack Morris.

In March 2016, Winfield helped represent Major League Baseball in Cuba during President Obama's trip to the island in an attempt to help normalize relations. On March 21 he gave a press conference with Joe Torre, Derek Jeter, and Luis Tiant in Havana and attended the baseball game between the Tampa Bay Rays and the Cuba National Team the next day.

In July 2022, Winfield delivered Bud Fowler's Hall of Fame speech in Cooperstown.

== In popular media ==
On Thanksgiving Day 1981, Winfield sang "I'll Take Manhattan" atop the Big Apple Float at the Macy's Thanksgiving Day Parade.

In 1985, the video game Dave Winfield's Batter Up! was released on computers by Avant-Garde, a producer of interactive educational software. The game featured a 55-page manual co-authored by Winfield and was marketed as an educational tool aimed to teach players about batting. The game was conceived after Winfield was seated next to an Avant-Garde investor on a cross-country flight.

During the 1994–95 MLB strike, Winfield and a handful of other striking players appeared as themselves in the November 27, 1994, episode of Married... with Children (Season 9, Episode 11).

In 1995, he made a guest appearance in season 1, episode 10 of The Drew Carey Show.

== Activism ==
=== Philanthropy ===
Well known for his philanthropic work, Winfield was the first active athlete to create a philanthropic foundation, The David M. Winfield Foundation. He began giving back to the communities in which he played from 1973, his first year with the Padres, when he began buying blocks of tickets to Padres games for families who could not afford to go to games, in a program known as "pavilions." Winfield then added health clinics to the equation, by partnering with San Diego's Scripps Clinic who had a mobile clinic which was brought into the stadium parking lot. When Winfield joined the Toronto Blue Jays, he learned teammate David Wells was one of the "Winfield kids" who attended Padres games.

In his hometown of St. Paul, he began a scholarship program (which continues to this day). In 1977, he organized his efforts into an official 501(c)(3) charitable organization known as the David M. Winfield Foundation for Underprivileged Youth. As his salary increased, Foundation programs expanded to include holiday dinner giveaways and national scholarships. In 1978, San Diego hosted the All-Star game, and Winfield bought his usual block of pavilion tickets. Winfield then went on a local radio station and inadvertently invited "all the kids of San Diego" to attend. To accommodate the unexpected crowd, the Foundation brought the kids into batting practice. The All-Star open-practice has since been adopted by Major League Baseball and continues to this day.

When Winfield joined the New York Yankees, he set aside $3 million of his contracted salary for the Winfield Foundation. The foundation created a partnership with the Hackensack University Medical Center including founding The Dave Winfield Nutrition Center, near his Teaneck, New Jersey, home. The Foundation also partnered with Merck Pharmaceuticals and created an internationally acclaimed bilingual substance abuse prevention program called "Turn it Around".

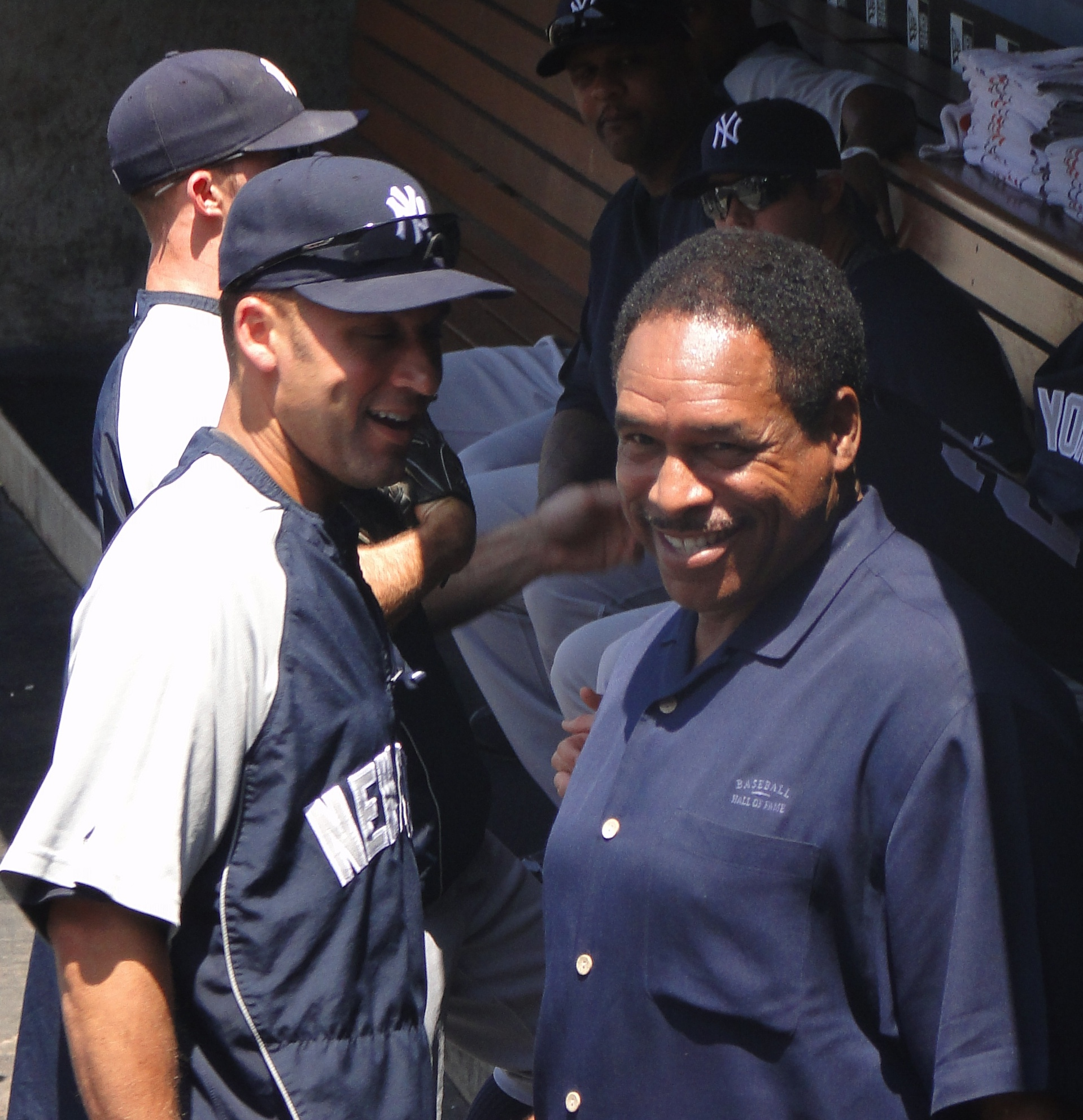
Winfield with Derek Jeter at Dodger Stadium in 2010

The Winfield Foundation also became a bone of contention in Steinbrenner's public feud with Winfield. Steinbrenner alleged that the foundation was mishandling funds and often held back payments to the organization, which resulted in long, costly court battles. It also created the appearance that Steinbrenner was contributing to the foundation, when in actuality, Steinbrenner was holding back a portion of Winfield's salary. Ultimately, the foundation received all of its funding and the alleged improprieties proved unfounded.

Winfield's philanthropic endeavors had as much influence on many of MLB's players as his on-field play. Yankee Derek Jeter, who grew up idolizing Winfield for both his athleticism and humanitarianism, credits Winfield as the inspiration for his own Turn 2 Foundation. In turn, Winfield continues to help raise funds and awareness for Jeter's Foundation and for many other groups and causes throughout the country.

== Quotes ==
- Now it's on to May, and you know about me and May. —after setting an American League record for RBI in April 1988.
- I am truly sorry that a fowl of Canada is no longer with us. —to the press after being released following the 1983 bird-killing incident.
- These days baseball is different. You come to spring training, you get your legs ready, your arms loose, your agents ready, your lawyer lined up.—at spring training, 1988, in response to his on-going feud with Steinbrenner.
- I have no problem with Bruce Springsteen.—when asked by the New York Daily News why he has such a problematic relationship with "the Boss" (a nickname shared by both Springsteen and Steinbrenner).
- "Three-ninety-nine sounds like something you'd purchase at a discount store. Four hundred sounds so much better.—upon hitting his 400th home run after 10 days mired at 399.

== See also ==
- 3,000 hit club
- List of Major League Baseball players to hit for the cycle
- List of Major League Baseball career doubles leaders
- List of Major League Baseball career runs batted in leaders
- List of Major League Baseball career runs scored leaders
- List of Major League Baseball career hits leaders
- List of Major League Baseball home run records
- List of Major League Baseball annual runs batted in leaders
- List of Major League Baseball retired numbers
- List of Major League Baseball career home run leaders
- List of baseball players who went directly to Major League Baseball
- List of athletes on Wheaties boxes
- List of multi-sport athletes

Awards and achievements
Preceded by Jack Clark	National League Player of the Month; June 1978	Succeeded by Pete Rose
Preceded by Doug DeCinces	American League Player of the Month; September 1982	Succeeded by George Brett
Preceded by Alan Trammell	American League Player of the Month; April 1988	Succeeded by Carney Lansford
Preceded by Paul Molitor	Hitting for the cycle June 24, 1991	Succeeded by Ray Lankford
