= Alaska Baseball League =

Amateur collegiate summer baseball league in southern Alaska

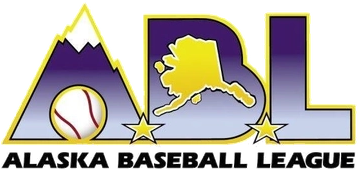
- League: National Baseball Congress
- Classification: Collegiate summer baseball
- Sport: Baseball
- Founded: 1974
- President: Chris Beck
- No. of teams: 5
- Country: United States
- Headquarters: Palmer, Alaska
- Most recent champion: Anchorage Glacier Pilots
- Website: alaskabaseballleague.org

The Alaska Baseball League (ABL) is an amateur collegiate summer baseball league based entirely in southern Alaska. Players in the league must have attended one year of college and must have one year of NCAA eligibility remaining.

In the past, the ABL has sent its top teams to compete at the National Baseball Congress (NBC) World Series, where the league's representatives have won multiple championships. Anchorage has won in 1969, 1971, 1986, 1991, and 2001, Fairbanks in 1972, 1973, 1974, 1976, 1980, and 2002, Kenai in 1977, 1993, and 1994, and Matsu in 1987 and 1997. League teams have also finished second in several years.

== Current teams ==
Team	City	Stadium	Capacity
Anchorage Bucs	Anchorage	Mulcahy Stadium	3,500
Anchorage Glacier Pilots	Anchorage	Mulcahy Stadium	3,500
Chugiak-Eagle River Chinooks	Chugiak	Loretta French Park	600
Mat-Su Miners	Palmer	Hermon Brothers Field	1,700
Peninsula Oilers	Kenai	Coral Seymour Memorial Ballpark	1,300

Alaska Baseball League (Alaska)

== Former teams ==
- North Pole Nicks 1980–1987
- Palouse Empire Cougars 1986–1990
- Hawaii Island Movers 1986–2001
- San Francisco Senators 1988
- Mendocino Blue Jays 1992
- Athletes in Action Fire 2001–2011
- Valley Green Giants 1976–1979
- Cook Inlet Bucs 1980–1983
- Alaska Goldpanners 1974–2010; 2012–2015

== Past league champions ==
*2026: Mat-Su Miners
- 2025: Mat-Su Miners
- 2024: Anchorage Bucs (Note: The championship between the Bucs and the Mat-Su Miners was cancelled due to heavy rainfall. The Bucs were named champions as they had the best record in the regular season.)
- 2023: Anchorage Glacier Pilots
- 2022: Anchorage Glacier Pilots
- 2021: Anchorage Glacier Pilots
- 2020: League Not Held (Note: The season was not held due to the global COVID-19 Pandemic.)
- 2019: Anchorage Bucs
- 2018: Mat-Su Miners
- 2017: Mat-Su Miners
- 2016: Mat-Su Miners
- 2015: Anchorage Bucs
- 2014: Fairbanks Goldpanners
- 2013: Fairbanks Goldpanners
- 2012: Anchorage Glacier Pilots
- 2011: Peninsula Oilers
- 2010: Mat-Su Miners
- 2009: Mat-Su Miners
- 2008: Anchorage Glacier Pilots
- 2007: Fairbanks AIA Fire
- 2006: Peninsula Oilers
- 2005: Fairbanks Goldpanners
- 2004: Mat-Su Miners
- 2003: Fairbanks Goldpanners
- 2002: Fairbanks Goldpanners
- 2000: Peninsula Oilers
- 1998: Anchorage Bucs/Peninsula Oilers (tie)
- 1996: Anchorage Bucs
- 1994: Fairbanks Goldpanners
- 1993: Anchorage Bucs
- 1992: Anchorage Bucs
- 1991: Anchorage Bucs
- 1990: Anchorage Bucs

== Notable alumni ==
- Bruce Bochte
- Barry Bonds
- Aaron Boone
- Jason Castro
- Chris Chambliss
- Jesse Chavez
- Warren Cromartie
- Josh Donaldson
- JD Drew
- Jacoby Ellsbury
- Jeff Francis
- David Fletcher
- Jason Giambi
- Paul Goldschmidt
- Luis Gonzalez
- Mark Grace
- Brian Horwitz
- Randy Johnson
- Wally Joyner
- Aaron Judge
- Eric Karros
- Jeff Kent
- Jed Lowrie
- Mark McGwire
- Kris Medlen
- Troy Melton
- Doug Mientkiewicz
- Eli Morgan (born 1996)
- John Olerud
- James Paxton
- Mike Pereira
- Stephen Piscotty
- Tyson Ross
- Brendan Ryan
- Tom Seaver
- JT Snow
- Dave Stieb
- Kurt Suzuki
- Danny Valencia
- Frank Viola
- Jered Weaver
- C. J. Wilson
- Dave Winfield

== See also ==
- Western Baseball Association (1967–72)
