= Anchorage Bucs =

Collegiate summer baseball team

- Founded: 1981
- League: Alaska Baseball League
- Based in: Anchorage, Alaska
- Ballpark: Mulcahy Stadium
- Website: anchoragebucs.com

The Anchorage Bucs Baseball Club is a college summer baseball team in Anchorage, Alaska. The team has been a member of the Alaska Baseball League since 1981.

They were originally formed in 1980 as an Anchorage Adult League team. Team colors are black and gold. Former players who advanced to the majors include Keith Foulke, Geoff Jenkins, Wally Joyner, Don August, Jeff Kent and numerous others. They were known as the Cook Inlet Bucs until 1984.

Home games are played at Mulcahy Stadium in Anchorage.
