= Anchorage Glacier Pilots =

Collegiate summer baseball team

- Logo

Information
- League: Alaska Baseball League
- Location: Anchorage, Alaska
- Ballpark: Mulcahy Stadium
- Founded: 1969
- Former league: Big West Conference (1970-1972)
- Colors: Blue and White
- Manager: Robert Anders
- Website: pilots.alaskabaseballleague.org

The Anchorage Glacier Pilots are a college summer baseball team in Anchorage, Alaska in the United States. They are part of the Alaska Baseball League, and a member of the National Baseball Congress.

The Pilots have won the NBC World Series in 1969, 1971, 1986, 1991 and 2001. They were formed in 1969. Team colors are royal blue and white.

Home games are played at Mulcahy Stadium, in Anchorage.

From 1970 to 1972, the Glacier Pilots were a member of the Big West Conference, along with the Alaska Goldpanners, Humboldt Crabs, Grand Junction Eagles, and Bellingham Bells.

Pat Doyle, a member of the team Hall of Fame, managed the team in 1990 and 1991.

Future major leaguers who have played for the Glacier Pilots include Mark McGwire, Troy Melton, Rick Aguilera and Roy Smalley III.
