= Peninsula Oilers =

- Logo

Information
- League: Alaska Baseball League
- Location: Kenai, Alaska
- Ballpark: Coral Seymour Memorial Ballpark
- Founded: 1974
- National Baseball Congress championships: 3 (1977, 1993, 1994)
- League championships: 4 (1998, 2000, 2006, 2011)
- Colors: Red, black, white

Current uniforms
Home	Away

The Peninsula Oilers are a college summer baseball club in the Alaska Baseball League. The Oilers are based in Kenai, Alaska, and their name refers to the Kenai Peninsula region. They are the league's southernmost team. The team was founded in 1974 and play their home games in the 1,300-seat Coral Seymour Memorial Ballpark.

The Oilers won the National Baseball Congress tournament in 1977, 1993, and 1994. They finished second in 1991, 1999, and 2011.

Several successful Major League Baseball players have played for the Oilers, including 7-time All-Star Dave Stieb, Atlee Hammaker, 4-time All-Star Jimmy Key, John Olerud, Cy Young Award winner Frank Viola and six-time Rawlings Gold Glove Award winner J.T. Snow, and several first-round picks including J. D. Drew.

The Oilers are funded mainly through donations, and through gambling revenues, especially pull tabs and bingo operations run by the team. The team's reliance on gambling eventually led them to overextend themselves on bingo, with an attempt to maintain a five-night-a-week bingo operation thwarted by the fact that the region could only reliably draw players one night a week. By 2024, the Oilers were in dire financial straits. The Oilers were unable to field a team in 2025. The team returned to play in 2026 after paying off its debts, abandoning its bingo operations and pursuing new off-field facilities.
