= Alaska Goldpanners =

Collegiate summer baseball team

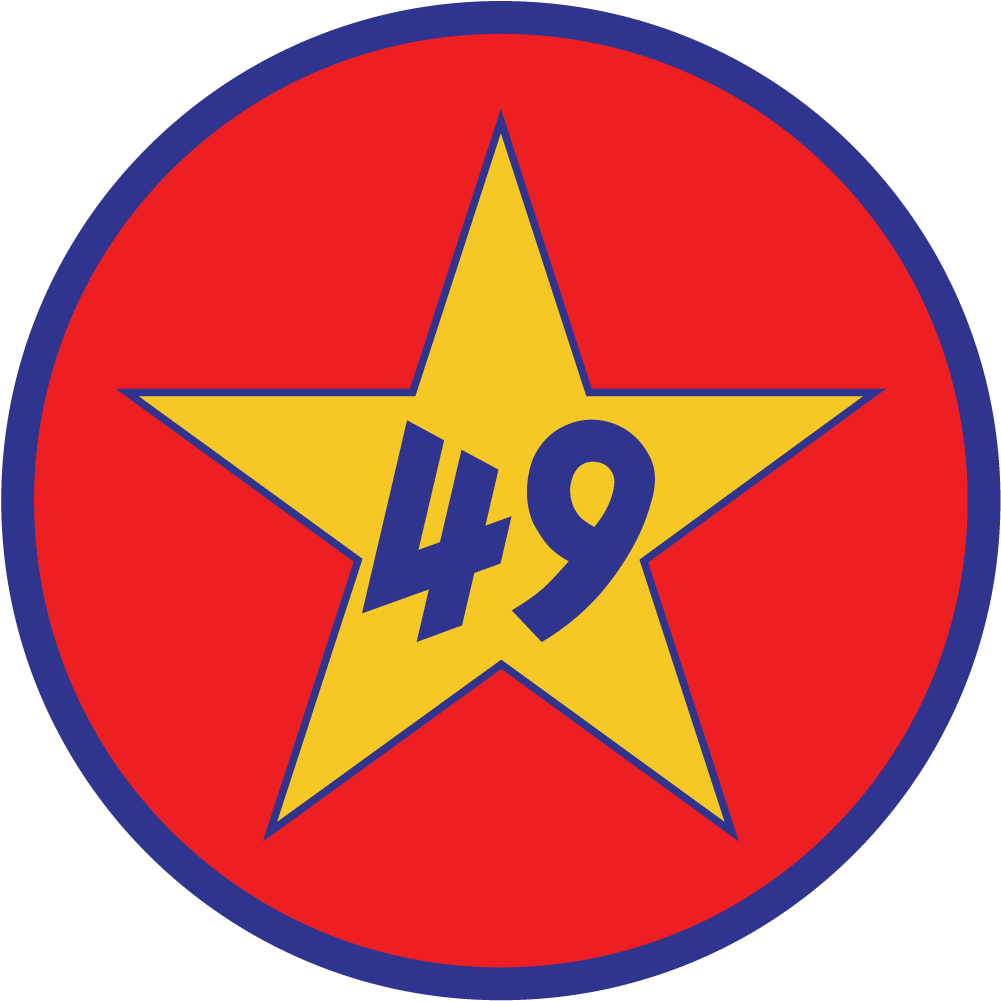
- Logo

Information
- Location: Fairbanks, Alaska
- Ballpark: Growden Memorial Park
- Founded: 1960
- Nickname: 'Panners
- League championships: NBC (1972–1974, 1976, 1980, 2002); Alaska (1961–1968, 1970, 1972–1975, 1978–1984, 1986, 1991, 1994–1995, 2002–2003, 2005, 2013–2014)
- Former league(s): Western Baseball Association (1967); Big West Conference (1970–1971); Alaska Baseball League (1974–2015)
- Colors: Blue, Gold, Red
- Mascot: Happy Boy
- Ownership: Alaska Goldpanner Baseball, Inc (non-profit)
- President: Abram Siddall
- General manager: John Lohrke
- Manager: Carlos Gonzales
- Website: http://www.goldpanners.com

The Alaska Goldpanners of Fairbanks are a collegiate summer baseball team which was founded in 1960 as an independent barnstorming team. The Goldpanners were charter members of the Alaska Baseball League at the league's inception in 1974, but left the league in 2015 to return to a barnstorming schedule. The Goldpanners play their home games at Growden Memorial Park in Fairbanks, Alaska, United States. They also host the annual Midnight Sun Game at their home venue.

Like other amateur collegiate summer baseball teams, the Goldpanners operate in a similar manner to professional minor league organizations: playing a nightly schedule, using wooden bats, and with lengthy road trips facing advanced competition. Due to Fairbanks' isolated location, the Goldpanners often play teams from the rest of Alaska and the West Coast of the Lower 48.

== History ==
=== Early days (1960–1973) ===
Founded by H. A. Boucher in 1960, Fairbanks' baseball team first made national news when the Pan-Alaska Gold Panners appeared in the 1962 National Baseball Congress championship game. Following a business re-organization led by W.G. Stroecker in 1963, the team was renamed the Alaska Goldpanners.

In 1967, the Goldpanners were in the inaugural Western Baseball Association with the Humboldt Crabs, Grand Junction Eagles, Bellingham Bells, and the Santa Rosa Rosebuds.

From 1970 to 1972, the Goldpanners were a member of the Big West Conference, along with the Crabs, Eagles, Bells, and the Anchorage Glacier Pilots. Future baseball hall-of-famer Dave Winfield played for the Goldpanners in 1971 and 1972, being named MVP in the latter season. Winfield returned to Fairbanks for the 2024 Midnight Sun Game for the unveiling of a statue in his honor.

=== Alaska Baseball League (1974–2015) ===
In 1974, the Goldpanners were founding members of the Alaska Baseball League.

The Goldpanners played the 2011 season with a shortened independent schedule due to financial difficulties.

=== Departure from the ABL (2016–present) ===
The Goldpanners announced in September 2015 that they were leaving the ABL and would instead play a barnstorming schedule so that they would be available to play in the National Baseball Congress championship game, which is held before the end of the ABL season. This decision angered representatives of the ABL, who threatened not to let the team back into the league. Alaska baseball writer Rick Boots attempted to mediate an agreement twice to reconcile the Goldpanners and the ABL in 2018 and 2019, but at least one team refused to consider the notion and three others raised multiple concerns about readmitting the team, among them travel expenses. In 2020, they applied to rejoin the league for the 2021 season and were denied, as the league was not in the financial position to take on the extra expense at the time, with the ABL stating the team would be welcome to reapply in 2022. The team again applied for re-entry into the ABL in 2023 but were rejected for unclear reasons. Under a plan set forth by ABL commissioner Chip Dill, the Goldpanners were on pace to return to the ABL by 2025, with the Goldpanners taking part in a Scout Showcase series with the ABL in 2024, but Dill's sudden departure from the commissionership after the 2023 season left that plan in jeopardy. The Goldpanners did not rejoin the ABL in 2025 despite the league preferring additional teams (after the Peninsula Oilers suspended operations for the season and forced the ABL to shorten its schedule); a Goldpanners representative stated that it was unhappy with the way the ABL was structured, especially because the commissioner position remained vacant.

== League and Tournament Wins ==
- 1960 North of the Range League
- 1961 North of the Range League
- 1961 Alaska Regional NBC Tournament
- 1962 North of the Range League
- 1962 Alaska Regional NBC Tournament
- 1964 Alaska Regional NBC Tournament
- 1966 Hawaii International baseball tournament
- 1966 World baseball tournament
- 1970 Alaska Baseball League
- 1970 Big West Conference Tournament
- 1972 Alaska Baseball League
- 1972 National Baseball Congress World Series
- 1973 Alaska World Series
- 1973 National Baseball Congress World Series
- 1974 Kamloops, B.C., International Baseball Tournament
- 1974 National Baseball Congress World Series
- 1975 Kamloops, B.C., International Baseball Tournament
- 1976 National Baseball Congress World Series
- 1976 Kamloops, B.C., International Baseball Tournament
- 1977 Kamloops, B.C., International Baseball Tournament
- 1978 Alaska Baseball League
- 1979 Alaska Baseball League
- 1980 Alaska Baseball League
- 1980 National Baseball Congress World Series
- 1981 Alaska Baseball League
- 1982 Alaska Baseball League
- 1983 Alaska Baseball League
- 1984 Alaska Baseball League
- 1986 Alaska Baseball League Pacific Division
- 1988 U.S. Open Baseball Tournament - Tahoe
- 1990 U.S. Open Baseball Tournament - Ontario
- 1991 Alaska Baseball League
- 1993 Alaska Federation
- 1994 Alaska Baseball League
- 1994 Alaska baseball tournament
- 1995 Alaska Federation
- 1995 Alaska Baseball League
- 1996 Hawaii International Baseball Tournament
- 2001 Wood Bat Invitation Tournament
- 2002 Alaska Baseball League
- 2002 National Baseball Congress World Series
- 2003 Alaska Baseball League
- 2003 Wood Bat Invitation Tournament
- 2005 Alaska Baseball League
- 2009 Kamloops, B.C., International Baseball Tournament
- 2013 Barona Bash Invitational Tournament
- 2013 Alaska Baseball League
- 2014 Alaska Baseball League
- 2019 Grand Forks International Baseball Tournament
- 2025 Grand Forks International Baseball Tournament

== Notable alumni ==
- Mike Boddicker
- Barry Bonds
- Bob Boone
- Bret Boone
- Pete Broberg
- Roger Clemens
- Bobby Crosby
- Alvin Davis
- Terry Francona
- Jason Giambi
- Aaron Heilman
- Kevin Higgins
- Adam Kennedy
- Dave Kingman
- Bill "Spaceman" Lee
- Travis Lee
- Don Leppert
- Shane Mack
- Oddibe McDowell
- Kevin McReynolds
- Kris Medlen
- Andy Messersmith
- Rick Monday
- Curt Motton
- Graig Nettles
- Brendan Ryan
- Tom Seaver
- Dave Winfield
- Michael Young
- Alex Vesia

== Midnight Sun game ==
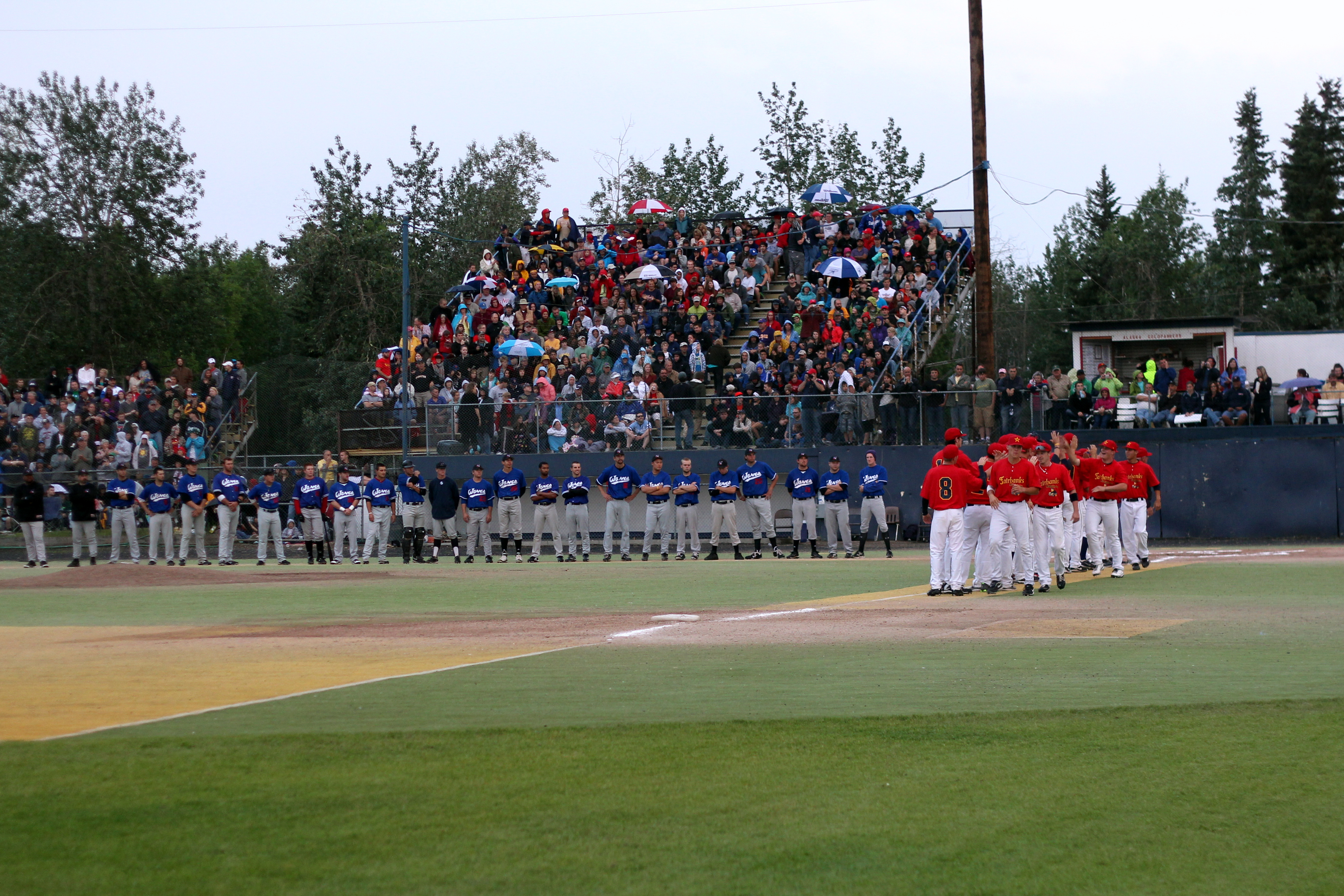
The players line up before the first pitch of the 2011 Midnight Sun Game.

First held in 1906, the annual Midnight Sun Game is held yearly in Fairbanks, hosted by the Goldpanners. The game, which begins at 10:30 PM on the night of the summer solstice, has gained the attention of international media.

== 2024 roster ==
- Manager: Bret Lachemann
- Assistant Coaches: Carlos Gonzales, Nick Rush and Logan Smith
- Pitchers
  - Cooper Bagby
  - Dane Grant
  - Paxton Fenberg
  - Matthew Gonzales
  - Ryan Lachemann
  - Wade Lawson
  - Shaw Lee
  - Matt Novis
  - Raymond Padilla
  - Treyson Peters
  - Mason Robertson
  - Noah Smith
  - Andrew Troppmann
  - Brandon Wyland
  - Lucas Zack
- Catchers
  - Matt Chavez
  - Logan Wimberly
- Infielders
  - Mikey Bell
  - Rocco Caballero
  - Alex Garcia
  - Griffin Harrison
  - Isaiah Munoz
  - Holt Williams
- Outfielders
  - Zach Doyle
  - Jesse Espinoza
  - Hayden Iverson
  - Matt Leiterman
  - Troy McCain
