= Wade Meckler =

American baseball player (born 2000)

- Meckler with the Los Angeles Angels in 2026

Los Angeles Angels – No. 53
- Outfielder
- Born: April 21, 2000 (age 26); Anaheim, California, U.S.
- Bats: Left Throws: Right

MLB debut
- August 14, 2023, for the San Francisco Giants

MLB statistics (through 2026 season)
- Batting average: .289
- Home runs: 3
- Runs batted in: 31
- Stats at Baseball Reference

Teams
- San Francisco Giants (2023); Los Angeles Angels (2026–present)

Wade Jameson Meckler (born April 21, 2000) is an American professional baseball outfielder for the Los Angeles Angels of Major League Baseball (MLB). He has previously played in MLB for the San Francisco Giants. Meckler played college baseball for the Oregon State Beavers. He was selected by the Giants in the eighth round of the 2022 MLB draft, and made his MLB debut with them the following year.

== Early life ==
Meckler was born in Anaheim, California, the son of Laura and Brian Meckler, and has a brother, Wyatt. His mother played college volleyball at San José State University. His hometown is Yorba Linda, California.

== High school ==
Meckler attended Esperanza High School in Anaheim. As a high school freshman, he was shortest in the school at 4 feet 10 inches (1.47 metres) tall and weighed only 75 pounds (34 kilograms); he barely made the freshman baseball team. As a sophomore, he weighed 100 pounds. In his junior season Meckler batted .301 with 17 runs and 11 stolen bases. As a senior, by which time he was 5 ft 8 in (1.73 m) and 145 pounds, he batted .375 with 28 runs. He played third base, second base, shortstop, and outfield. He was a two-time All-League All-Academic selection, and was ranked in the top 500 players nationally by Perfect Game. Throughout high school he had a 4.4 GPA, and he was a Collegiate Scholar and earned the Golden State Award. He graduated with honors, was an AP Scholar with Distinction, and scored 1470 on his SAT. He did not receive a scholarship offer from any NCAA Division I or Division II programs.

== College ==
Meckler played college baseball as a walk-on at Oregon State University while majoring in finance. He never received a scholarship from the school and was cut from the baseball team after his freshman year in 2019. In summer 2019, he played summer ball with the Duluth Huskies of the Northwoods League. He returned to Oregon State for his sophomore year, but did not make the baseball team. Meckler rejoined the Beavers in 2021.

In 2021 with Oregon State he batted .303/.396/.472 in 142 at bats, playing 21 games in right field and 15 games in left field, playing most of the season with a hamstring injury. That summer, he played for the Ridgefield Raptors of the West Coast League. In 2022 with Oregon State he batted leadoff and hit .347/.456(4th in the Pac-12 Conference/.478, leading the conference with 81 runs and 23 doubles, with 12 stolen bases, and 53 walks (3rd) vs. 49 strikeouts in 268 at bats while playing 50 games in left field and seven games in right field. He was named All-Pac-12 First Team, Corvallis Regional All-Tournament Team, CoSIDA Academic All-District 8, and was named Collegiate Baseball National Player of the Week on April 25. In his college career, he batted .326/.435/.467 in 420 at bats while on defense he had a 1.000 fielding percentage in 134 chances.

== Professional career ==
=== San Francisco Giants ===
==== Minor leagues ====
Meckler was drafted by the San Francisco Giants in the eighth round of the 2022 Major League Baseball draft. He signed for a below-slot signing bonus of $97,500.

Meckler made his professional debut with the rookie–level Arizona Complex League Giants, with whom he batted .290/.460/.395 in 38 at bats playing nine games in center field, two in left field, and one in right field. He was then promoted to the Single–A San Jose Giants in the California League with whom he batted .439/.540/.683 in 41 at bats, playing 11 games in left field and two games in center field.

He started 2023 with the High–A Eugene Emeralds of the Northwest League, with whom Meckler batted .456/.494/.633 in 79 at bats, playing 10 games in right field, six in left field, and three in center field. He was promoted to the Double–A Richmond Flying Squirrels of the Eastern League during the season with whom he batted .336/.431/.450 in 149 at bats, playing 17 games in center field, 11 games in left field, and nine games in right field. He was then promoted to the Triple–A Sacramento RiverCats of the Pacific Coast League on July 31 where he was 3.7 years younger than the average player, and batted .400/.546/.600 in 25 at bats, playing four games in right field and three in left field before he was promoted to the major leagues. Baseball America tabbed him the Giants organization hitter with the best strike zone discipline.

==== Major leagues ====
On August 14, 2023, Meckler was selected to the 40-man roster and promoted to the major leagues for the first time. He made his major league debut with the Giants the same day, only 13 months after being drafted. On September 6, Meckler was optioned back to Sacramento.

Meckler was optioned to Triple–A Sacramento to begin the 2024 season. He spent the entirety of the season in the minor leagues, appearing for Sacramento, Richmond, Eugene, San Jose, and the ACL Giants. In 44 appearances split between the five affiliates, Meckler batted .280/.366/.423 with nine home runs, 41 RBI, and nine stolen bases.

Meckler was again optioned to Triple-A Sacramento to begin the 2025 season. In 87 appearances for the River Cats, he batted .287/.390/.370 with one home run, 32 RBI, and 11 stolen bases. Meckler was designated for assignment by San Francisco on December 19, 2025, following the signing of Adrian Houser.

=== Los Angeles Angels ===
On January 7, 2026, Meckler was claimed off waivers by the Los Angeles Angels. The Angels designated him for assignment on January 28. Meckler cleared waivers and was sent outright to the Triple-A Salt Lake Bees on February 2. He made 33 appearances split between Salt Lake and the Double-A Rocket City Trash Pandas, batting a cumulative .315/.445/.477 with four home runs, 14 RBI, and six stolen bases. On May 22, the Angels selected Meckler's contract, adding him to their active roster. He made his debut with the Angels that day against the Texas Rangers, going 2-for-3 including a three-run home run in his first at-bat.
