= Springfield Drifters =

Team in the West Coast Collegiate Baseball League

Information
- League: West Coast League (Since 2021) (South)
- Location: Springfield, Oregon
- Ballpark: Hamlin Sports Complex
- Founded: 2021
- Colors: Dark Blue, Sky Blue, White
- Ownership: Ike Olsson and Kelly Richardson
- General manager: Jake Willard
- Coach: Jeff Lyle

The Springfield Drifters are a collegiate summer baseball team in the West Coast League.

The Drifters have struggled to find success during their existence. The team is one of three to never clinch a winning record and one of two to never clinch a playoff berth.

== History ==
The Drifters were announced as the 16th team of the WCL on April 16, 2021 by the league. The Drifters announced that their playfield would be located in a new stadium in the complex of Hamlin Middle School.

The Drifters played their first game on May 31, 2022 on the road defeating the Bellingham Bells 4-2. Their first home game was played on June 3 with the Drifters falling to the Cowlitz Black Bears 11-6.

=== 2024 ===
On June 24, Kyle Larsen was named the league's pitcher of the week after throwing a five hit shutout in the Drifters' win against Corvallis the previous Tuesday.

On July 9, Kendren Kenzie and Dane Woodcook were selected to represent the Drifters in the 2024 All Star Game in Bellingham.

The Drifters once again failed to qualify for the playoffs. The Drifters are one of two franchises to never make the postseason, along with the Nanaimo NightOwls.

=== 2025 ===
On July 8, Cooper Mullens (Michigan) and Isaiah Ibarra (USC) were selected to represent the Drifters at the All Star Game in Bellingham.

The Drifters improved on their 20-34 record from the previous season. The Drifters went 22-32 and finished seventh in the South Division. Cesar Chavez (Cal State Los Angeles) finished with a .341 batting average. 12,115 total fans attended the Drifters' twenty-six home games for an average of 466 fans per game.

The Drifters were eliminated from playoff contention for the fourth straight season. The Drifters are one of three teams in the WCL to never clinch a playoff berth and one of four teams to never finish with a winning record.

=== 2026 ===
Tristan Ledbetter was named pitcher of the week by the league on June 8th.

Former Drifter Ryan Cooney participated in the 2026 MLB Draft Combine.

== Results by Season ==
Season	League	Division	Finish	Wins	Losses	Win%	GB	Postseason	Manager
2022	WCL	South	8th	17	37	0.315	22	Did Not Qualify	Tommy Richards
2023	WCL	South	6th	22	32	.407	17	Did Not Qualify	Tommy Richards
2024	WCL	South	8th	20	34	.370	21	Did Not Qualify	Alan Embree
2025	WCL	South	7th	22	32	.407	21	Did Not Qualify	Jeff Lyle
2026	WCL	South	5th	24	29	.452	6.5	Did Not Qualify	Jeff Lyle

Division champions	League champions	Playoff Team

== Playoff Appearances ==
The Drifters are one of two teams in the West Coast League to never qualify for the postseason.
