= Gene Lobe Field =

Ballpark in Bremerton, Washington, US

Ballpark Information
Location	1200 Fairgrounds Rd NW, Bremerton, WA, US
Coordinates	47.6301°N 122.663°W
Surface	Natural Grass
Capacity	1,200
Field Demotions	(LF) 315', (CF) 400', (RF) 320'

Tenants Kitsap BlueJackets (2004–2016)

Gene Lobe Field is 1 of 4 ballparks at the Kitsap County Fairgrounds and Events Center. It has played host to the Kitsap BlueJackets of the West Coast League. The BlueJackets have not had a winning season since 2007.

On July 26, 2013, Spenser Watkins threw a perfect game against the Victoria HarbourCats in front of 413 fans cheering him on to a 2–0 win.
