= Kitsap =

Kitsap may refer to:

- Kitsap County, Washington
- Kitsap Peninsula, a peninsula in western Washington state, lying between Hood Canal and Puget Sound.
- Chief Kitsap, a Suquamish Indian for whom the county was named
- Naval Base Kitsap, a US Navy base located in Kitsap County, Washington
- Kitsap Beach, a town now known as Indianola, Washington
- Kitsap BlueJackets, baseball team in Bremerton, Washington
- Kitsap Transit
- Ketchup, a table condiment which has variously been spelled catsup, catchup, and ketchup
