= Port Angeles Lefties =

Collegiate summer baseball team

- Logo

Information
- League: West Coast League
- Location: Port Angeles, Washington
- Ballpark: Civic Field
- Founded: 2017
- Former name: Kitsap BlueJackets (2005–2016)
- Colors: Royal blue, orange, white
- Mascot: Timber the Olympic Marmot
- Ownership: MACK Athletics; Matt Acker; Jacob Oppelt; Eric V. Traut; Connor Traut
- Manager: Matt Acker
- Website: paleftiesbaseball.com

The Port Angeles Lefties are a collegiate summer baseball team based in Port Angeles, Washington. The Lefties don't currently have a league, and play their home games at Civic Field.

Since their entry into the league, the Lefties have struggled to find success. The team has never clinched a winning season and has finished at or near the bottom of the standings at the end of each year. The Lefties are one of two teams in the league to never clinch a postseason berth.

== History ==
=== 2017 ===
The Port Angeles Lefties entered the league with play in the 2017 season and went 19–34, placing 6th place in the North Division of the West Coast League. A total of 36,883 fans attended home games at Civic Field, placing 3rd in total attendance in the West Coast League. The Lefties opened their team store in the heart of downtown Port Angeles.

=== 2018 ===
The Port Angeles Lefties went 21–33, placing 6th place in the North Division of the West Coast League. A total of 35,867 fans attended home games, placing 4th in per game attendance in the West Coast League. The Port Angeles Lefties hosted the 2018 West Coast League All-Star Game and Home Run Derby.

=== 2019 ===
The Port Angeles Lefties went 22–32, placing 4th place in the North Division of the West Coast League.

=== 2020 ===
The Port Angeles Lefties 2020 regular season began on May 29, 2020.

=== 2022 ===
The Port Angeles Lefties are fifth in the North Division with an 11–14 record and are 7.5 games behind the division leading Bellingham Bells. Infielder Riley Parker (Cal State San Bernardino) (Snohomish, WA) is seventh in the league in RBIs (15). Pitchers Andrew Hauck (Utah Valley College) and Liam Paddack (Spokane Falls Community College) are both in the top seven with three wins each. Pitcher John Pfeffer (Cal State San Bernardino) leads the league in strikeouts (31) and is sixth in ERA (1.73). The Lefties have sold 12,641 tickets for an average of 1,405 fans per game.

On June 14, 2022, the Lefties signed former NFL wide-receiver Golden Tate. Tate made his debut that evening going 2 for 4 at the plate. Tate recorded two base hits, a RBI, a run and one stolen base in his debut.

=== 2023 ===
As of July 15, the Lefties are 7th in the North with a 10–25 record and are 15 games behind the division leading Applesox. Roberto Nunez (Embry-Riddle University) has 24 RBIs and a batting average of .359.

=== 2024 ===
On June 24, Jeremy Giesegh was named the league's player of the week. Giesegh reached base twelve times, and finished the previous week with seven runs batted in and two stolen bases.

On July 9, Jeremy Giesegh was selected to represent the Lefties in the 2024 All Star Game in Bellingham.

The Lefties failed to make the postseason for the seventeenth straight season. The Lefties' drought dates all the way back to 2007 when the franchise played as the Kitsap BlueJackets.

=== 2025 ===
Tommy Markey (Fordham) was named player of the week by the league on June 30. Eight days later, Markey would be selected to represent the Lefties at the All Star Game in Bellingham.

The Lefties improved on their 16-37 record from the previous season. The Lefties went 20-34 and finished seventh in the North Division. Jack Edmunds (Brown) hit eight home runs. Takuma Sato (Mount Hood Community College) threw forty strikeouts. Seth Wrightstone (Vanguard) and Garrett Holpuch (Tennessee Tech) finished with ERA's of 3.52 and 3.78 respectively. 29,691 total fans attended the Lefties' twenty-seven home games for an average of 1,100 fans per game.

The Lefties were eliminated from playoff contention for the eighth straight season. The Lefties are one of three teams in the WCL to never clinch a playoff berth and one of four to never clinch a winning season.

=== 2026 ===
Carter Enoch and Ethan Wood were selected to represent the Lefties at the 2026 WCL All Star Game in Victoria. Wood recorded a base hit and RBI in the North All Stars 4-5 loss.

Wood would be named player of the week by the league on July 20th.

The Lefties failed to improve on their 20-34 record from the previous season. The team posted a league worst as well as team all time worst record of 11-43 and finished twenty-seven and a half games behind the AppleSox. Wood finished fourth in the league with a.355 batting average. The Lefties once again failed to qualify for the postseason and remain one of two teams to never make the postseason as well as one of three teams to never clinch a winning record.

== Results by Season ==
League Champions	Division Champions	Playoff Team

Season	League	Division	Finish	Wins	Losses	Win%	GB	Postseason	Manager
2017	WCL	North	6th	19	34	.358	11.5	Did Not Qualify	Zach Miller
2018	WCL	North	6th	21	33	.389	14	Did Not Qualify	Darren Westergard
2019	WCL	North	4th	22	32	.407	17	Did Not Qualify	Darren Westergard
2020	Season cancelled (COVID-19 pandemic)								
2021	WCL	North	5th	13	35	.271	16	Did Not Qualify	Matt Acker
2022	WCL	North	8th	20	34	.370	13.5	Did Not Qualify	Matt Greely
2023	WCL	North	7th	13	41	.241	25.5	Did Not Qualify	Matt Acker
2024	WCL	North	7th	16	37	.302	18	Did Not Qualify	Donald Brais
2025	WCL	North	7th	20	34	.370	14	Did Not Qualify	Donald Brais
2026	WCL	North	8th	11	43	.203	29	Did Not Qualify	Donald Brais

== Playoff Appearances ==
The Lefties are one of two teams in the West Coast League to never clinch a playoff berth as well as one of three teams to never clinch a winning record.

== Notable alumni ==
- Golden Tate: NFL Wide Receiver
