= Riverhawks =

Riverhawks may refer to:

== Canada ==
- Niagara Riverhawks junior hockey team
- Edmonton Riverhawks, baseball team in the West Coast League

== United States ==
- Anne Arundel Community College Riverhawks (Arnold, Maryland)
- Cincinnati Riverhawks soccer team (Cincinnati, Ohio)
- Johnstown Riverhawks defunct indoor football team.
- Northeastern State University Riverhawks (Tahlequah, Oklahoma)
- Susquehanna University River Hawks (Selinsgrove, Pennsylvania)
- Rockford RiverHawks professional baseball team (Springfield, Illinois)
- UMass Lowell River Hawks (Lowell, Massachusetts)
- Quad City Riverhawks Premier Basketball League team (Moline, Illinois)
- Umpqua Community College Riverhawks (Roseburg, Oregon)

== See also ==
- Osprey, a species of bird
