= Al Coates (broadcaster) =

Canadian radio broadcaster

Al Coates (born in Leduc, Alberta) is a Canadian sports commentator. He is the play-by-play announcer for the Edmonton Riverhawks of the West Coast League alongside his long time partner John Belmont. He was previously the play-by-play commentator of the Edmonton Prospects, Edmonton Trappers and the Edmonton Cracker-Cats. He has been broadcasting since 1980 and was general manager of the Edmonton Cracker-Cats for the 2007 season. A job he "seemed uncomfortable" with, quitting the role after just 1 season and returning to play-by-play.
