= Nick Pivetta =

Canadian baseball player (born 1993)

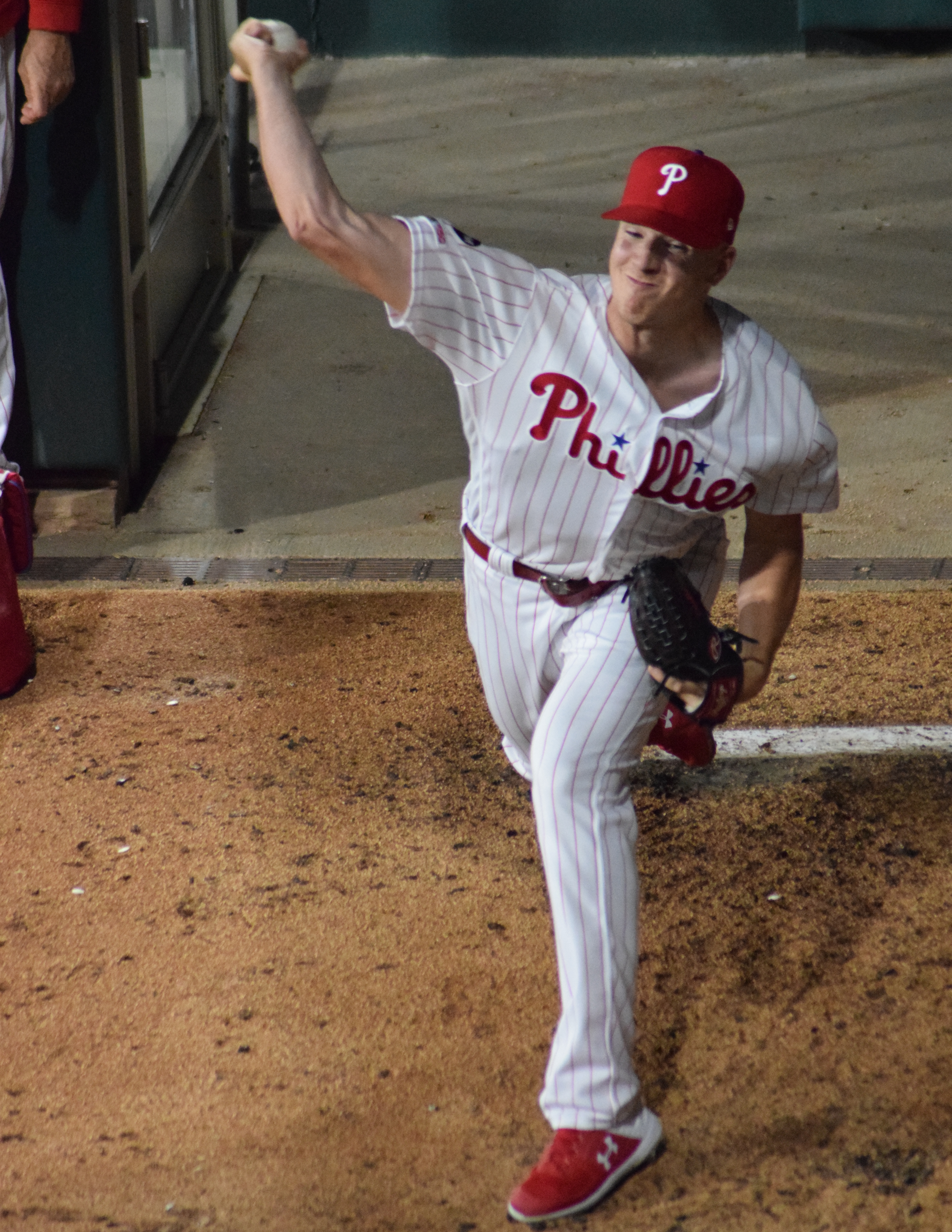
- Pivetta with the Phillies in 2019

Free agent
- Pitcher
- Born: February 14, 1993 (age 33); Victoria, British Columbia, Canada
- Bats: Right Throws: Right

MLB debut
- April 30, 2017, for the Philadelphia Phillies

MLB statistics (through 2026 season)
- Win–loss record: 72–78
- Earned run average: 4.43
- Strikeouts: 1,371
- Stats at Baseball Reference

Teams
- Philadelphia Phillies (2017–2020); Boston Red Sox (2020–2024); San Diego Padres (2025–2026)

Nicholas John Carlo Pivetta (born February 14, 1993) is a Canadian professional baseball pitcher who is a free agent. He has played in Major League Baseball (MLB) for the Philadelphia Phillies, Boston Red Sox, and San Diego Padres. The Washington Nationals selected Pivetta in the fourth round of the 2013 MLB draft. He was traded to the Phillies during the 2015 season and made his MLB debut with them in 2017. The Phillies traded him to the Red Sox in 2020, and he signed a four-year contract with the Padres in 2025. He pitched for Canada in the 2017 World Baseball Classic.

Listed at 6 feet 5 inches (1.96 m) and 210 pounds (95 kg), he throws and bats right-handed.

== Career ==
=== Amateur career ===
Pivetta was born in Victoria, British Columbia, Canada. He attended Lambrick Park Secondary School in Saanich, British Columbia. He missed pitching his senior year in high school due to an ulnar collateral ligament injury in his right elbow. He was a member of the Canada junior national team from 2009–12, pitching in the 2010 18U World Championship.

He attended New Mexico Junior College where he played for the Thunderbirds on a baseball scholarship, and graduated in 2013. In his first season, he had a 4–1 win–loss record with a 4.83 earned run average (ERA) in 54 innings pitched. As a sophomore in 2013, he was 9–2 with a 3.36 ERA, had a .235 batting average against, and pitched six complete games. Baseball America named him the sixth-best junior college prospect in 2013, and Perfect Game USA ranked him the third-best junior college prospect, as his fastball reached as high as 97 miles per hour (156 km/h). He played youth baseball for the Victoria Eagles of the British Columbia Premier Baseball League, and collegiate summer baseball for the Victoria HarbourCats of the West Coast League.

=== Washington Nationals ===
The Washington Nationals selected Pivetta in the fourth round of the 2013 MLB draft. He signed with the Nationals for $364,300, and made his professional debut with the Gulf Coast Nationals of the Rookie Gulf Coast League. He ended the season with the Auburn Doubledays of the Class A New York-Pennsylvania League. In nine games (eight starts) between the two teams, he was 1–1 with a 2.91 ERA.

Pivetta spent 2014 with the Class A Hagerstown Suns, where he was a South Atlantic League (SAL) mid-season All-Star, the June 23 SAL Pitcher of the Week, and where his 13 wins were third in the SAL and tied for first among all Washington minor leaguers. He finished the season with a 13–8 record, 4.22 ERA, and 1.37 WHIP in 26 games (25 starts; tied for seventh in the league). Following the season, Baseball America named him the 10th-best prospect in the Nationals' minor league system.

In 2015, Pivetta was 7–4 with a 2.29 ERA for the Class A-Advanced Potomac Nationals and was a Carolina League All Star.

=== Philadelphia Phillies ===
==== 2015–2017 ====
On July 28, 2015, the Nationals traded Pivetta to the Philadelphia Phillies for Jonathan Papelbon.

In 2016, Pivetta was 11–6 (his 11 wins were 3rd in the league) with a 3.41 ERA (6th) and 111 strikeouts (6th) for the Double-A Reading Phillies, with whom Pivetta was an Eastern League mid-season All Star. He was also 1–2 with a 2.55 ERA and 27 strikeouts in 24.2 innings in five starts for the Triple-A Lehigh Valley IronPigs. The Phillies added him to their 40-man roster after the 2016 season.

Pivetta played for Canada in the 2017 World Baseball Classic.

In 2017, Pivetta went 5–0 with a 1.41 ERA for the IronPigs, and was Phillies Minor League Pitcher of the Week for the week ended April 16. Pivetta was promoted to the 25-man roster on April 30, making his MLB debut that day against the Los Angeles Dodgers. He went 8–10 with a 6.02 ERA and 140 strikeouts in 133 innings for the Phillies. Among MLB rookies, he was first in strikeouts per nine innings pitched (K/9, 9.47, minimum 125 innings pitched; the highest ratio ever by a Phillies rookie with at least 25 starts), and third in strikeouts (140; tied for the 9th-most strikeouts in a season ever by a Phillies rookie).

==== 2018–2020 ====
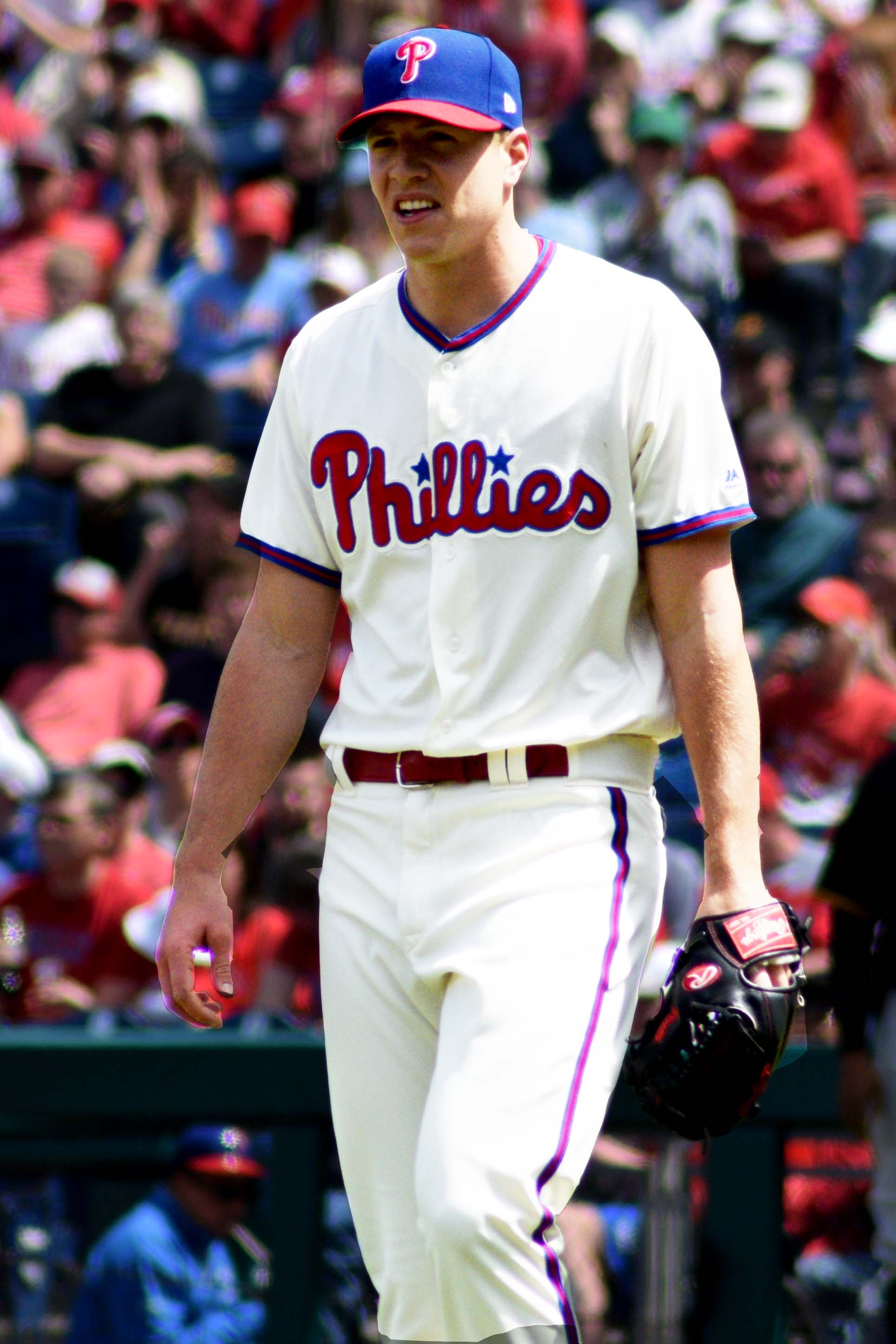
Pivetta in 2018

In 2018, Pivetta was 7–14 with a 4.77 ERA, 5th in the National League (NL) with 10.32 K/9 (the second-highest rate of any Phillie pitcher in franchise history, behind Curt Schilling's 11.29 in 1997), eighth in the NL in strikeouts (188) and wild pitches (11), ninth in the NL in games started (32) and strikeout-to-walk ratio (3.69), and led the major leagues in allowing opposing batters the highest batting average on balls in play (.326). He struck out a career-high 13 batters on June 18 against St. Louis. His fastball was clocked as high as 98 miles per hour.

In 2019, Pivetta struggled at the beginning of the season before being demoted to Triple-A. With Lehigh Valley, he was 5–1 with a 3.07 ERA, as in 9 games (6 starts) and 41 innings he struck out 58 batters (with a 12.7 K/9 ratio, 5th-best in the International League), and giving up 23 hits had the best hits per 9 innings ratio in the league at 5.0. On July 19, it was announced he would be shifted to a relief role. In 2019 with the Phillies, he was 4–6 with one save and a 5.38 ERA, as in 30 games (13 starts) he pitched 93.2 innings.

Pivetta made three appearances with Philadelphia during the shortened 2020 season, registering a 15.88 ERA in 5 2/3 innings pitched.

=== Boston Red Sox ===
==== 2020–2021 ====
On August 21, 2020, Pivetta was traded to the Boston Red Sox, along with Connor Seabold, in exchange for Brandon Workman, Heath Hembree and cash. Pivetta was added to Boston's active roster on September 22, making a start that day against the Baltimore Orioles. In his two games for the 2020 Red Sox, Pivetta earned two wins while compiling a 1.80 ERA with 13 strikeouts in 10 innings pitched.

Pivetta started the 2021 season as part of Boston's starting rotation. In his first seven starts, he compiled a 5–0 record, before being placed on the COVID-related injured list for one day, May 12, due to vaccine side effects. On June 24, Pivetta pitched 6 2/3 no-hit innings against the Tampa Bay Rays; he was removed from the game after throwing more than 100 pitches, and the Red Sox went on to lose both the no-hitter and the game. On September 5, Pivetta was placed on the COVID-related injured list; he returned to the team on September 12. During the regular season, Pivetta made 31 appearances (30 starts) for Boston, compiling a 9–8 record with 4.53 ERA—he earned a save in his lone relief appearance—while striking out 175 batters in 155 innings. He made three appearances (one start) in the postseason, allowing four runs in 13 2/3 innings.

==== 2022–2024 ====
Pivetta returned to the Red Sox rotation in 2022; making 33 starts he compiled a 10–12 record with a 4.56 ERA while striking out 175 batters in 179 2/3 innings.

On January 13, 2023, the Red Sox and Pivetta reached agreement on a one-year contract, avoiding salary arbitration. After making eight starts for Boston, in which he struggled to a 6.30 ERA, Pivetta was moved to the bullpen on May 17. Pivetta's season turned around once being moved to the bullpen, where he pitched to a sub-2.00 ERA, often pitching in long relief after an opener. On July 17, Pivetta pitched six hitless and scoreless innings of relief against the Oakland Athletics during which he recorded 13 strikeouts, setting a new Red Sox franchise record for the most strikeouts in a relief appearance.

Pivetta began the 2024 season in the starting rotation. He was placed on the injured list on April 9, due to a right elbow flexor strain. He was activated on May 8. On May 30, Pivetta tied a franchise record, previously set by Roger Clemens, by striking out eight consecutive batters. For the season, Pivetta posted a 6–12 record with a 4.14 ERA and 172 strikeouts while pitching 145 2/3 innings.

After the season, the Red Sox made Pivetta a $21.05 million qualifying offer, which he declined on November 19, making him a free agent.

=== San Diego Padres ===
On February 17, 2025, Pivetta signed a four-year, $55 million contract with the San Diego Padres. He made 31 starts for San Diego during the regular season, with a 13–5 record, 2.87 ERA, and 190 strikeouts across 181 2/3 innings pitched; his wins, strikeouts, and ERA marks all set career-highs.

On April 12, 2026 while pitching against the Colorado Rockies, Pivetta was pulled from the game by Padres manager Craig Stammen with the initial injury called elbow stiffness. Pivetta was later placed on the 15-day injured list, diagnosed with right elbow flexor strain. He was transferred to the 60-day injured list on June 2. On September 7, Pivetta was activated from the injured list. He started against the Washington Nationals, pitching five scoreless innings en route to a 3–2 victory. On October 31, the Padres declined their club option on Pivetta, making him a free agent.

== Pitching style ==
Pivetta throws a four-seam fastball, a curveball, and a slider. He threw a changeup early in his career, replacing it with a cutter in his arsenal while with Boston. He relies mostly on his fastball, which averages 94 miles per hour (151 km/h), and his two breaking balls. Through 2026, he threw his fastball 50% of the time, his 80-mile-per-hour (130 km/h) curve 22% of the time, and his 84-mile-per-hour (135 km/h) slider 16% of the time.
