= Edmonton Riverhawks =

Collegiate summer baseball league

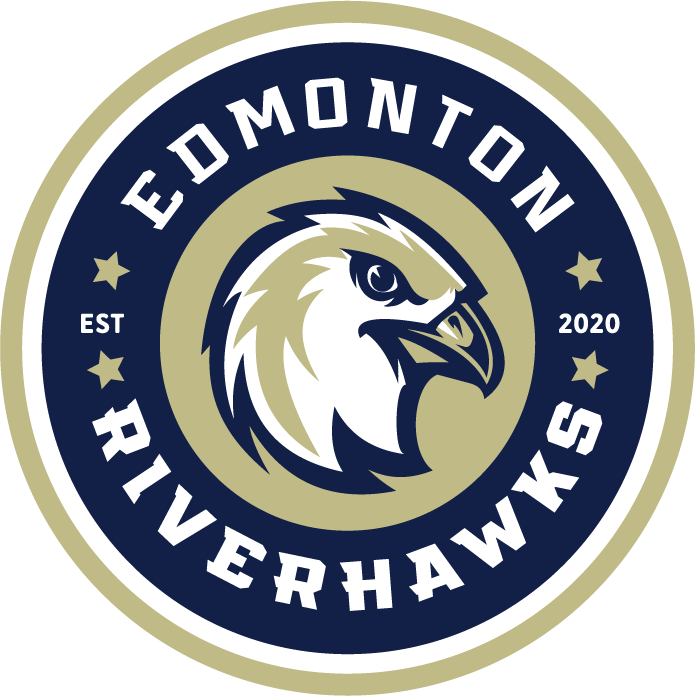
- Logo

Information
- League: West Coast League
- Location: Edmonton, Alberta
- Ballpark: RE/MAX Field
- Founded: 2020
- Colours: Navy, Carolina blue, Vegas gold
- Mascot: River the Hawk
- Ownership: Baseball Edmonton Inc.
- General manager: Steve Hogle
- Manager: Jake Lanferman
- Website: riverhawksbaseball.com

The Edmonton Riverhawks are a collegiate summer baseball team. The Riverhawks are members of the West Coast League and play their home games at RE/MAX Field.

The Riverhawks were founded in 2020 as an expansion team but did not play until 2022 due to COVID restrictions. The Riverhawks clinched their first winning season and playoff berth in 2024.

== History ==
In May 2020, Baseball Edmonton, a consortium headed by five-time Stanley Cup winner Randy Gregg along with 24 shareholders, secured a ten-year lease agreement with the City of Edmonton for RE/MAX Field. The move beat out a proposal by the Edmonton Prospects of the Western Canadian Baseball League, who had been using the stadium since 2012. Baseball Edmonton agreed to fund upgrades to the ballpark including new artificial turf, scoreboard, and lighting.

On September 15, 2020, Baseball Edmonton announced the founding of the Edmonton Riverhawks, a West Coast League (WCL) expansion franchise to begin play in 2021. Edmonton's entry into the WCL was the first to be located in Alberta. Due to the distance between the Riverhawks and their league brethren the franchise subsidizes travel to teams visiting Edmonton.

The WCL's Canadian teams cancelled their 2021 seasons because of the COVID-19 pandemic in Canada, postponing the Riverhawks' debut to 2022.

The Riverhawks played their first game on May 31, 2022, against the Kamloops NorthPaws.

=== 2022 ===
The Riverhawks finished 4th in the North Division. Outfielder Clayton Loranger (college: Stephen F. Austin State University, hometown: Sherwood Park, Alberta) had the fourth best batting average in the league (.403). Outfielder Ivan Brethowr (college: Arizona State University, hometown: Olathe, Kansas) was second in the league in RBIs with 19. The Riverhawks were second in the league in attendance with 63,221 fans coming through the gates for an average of 2,342 fans per game.

=== 2023 ===
On June 16, Jonny McGill was named one of the players of the week with a league-leading batting average of .483.

The Riverhawks failed to improve on their 25–28 record from the previous season, finishing sixth in the North with an 18–36 record. Jonny McGill (University of British Columbia) finished with a batting average of .335. Halen Knoll (University of Mary) threw 52 strikeouts and finished with five wins on the mound. Riley Barrett (Arizona State University) finished with an ERA of 1.73. Despite the futile season, the Riverhawks finished with the best attendance in the league. 104,378 total fans bought tickets for an average of 3,880 per game.

The Riverhawks finished with an undefeated 2–0 record against non-league teams. 1,420 total fans attended these two games for an average of 710.

=== 2024 ===
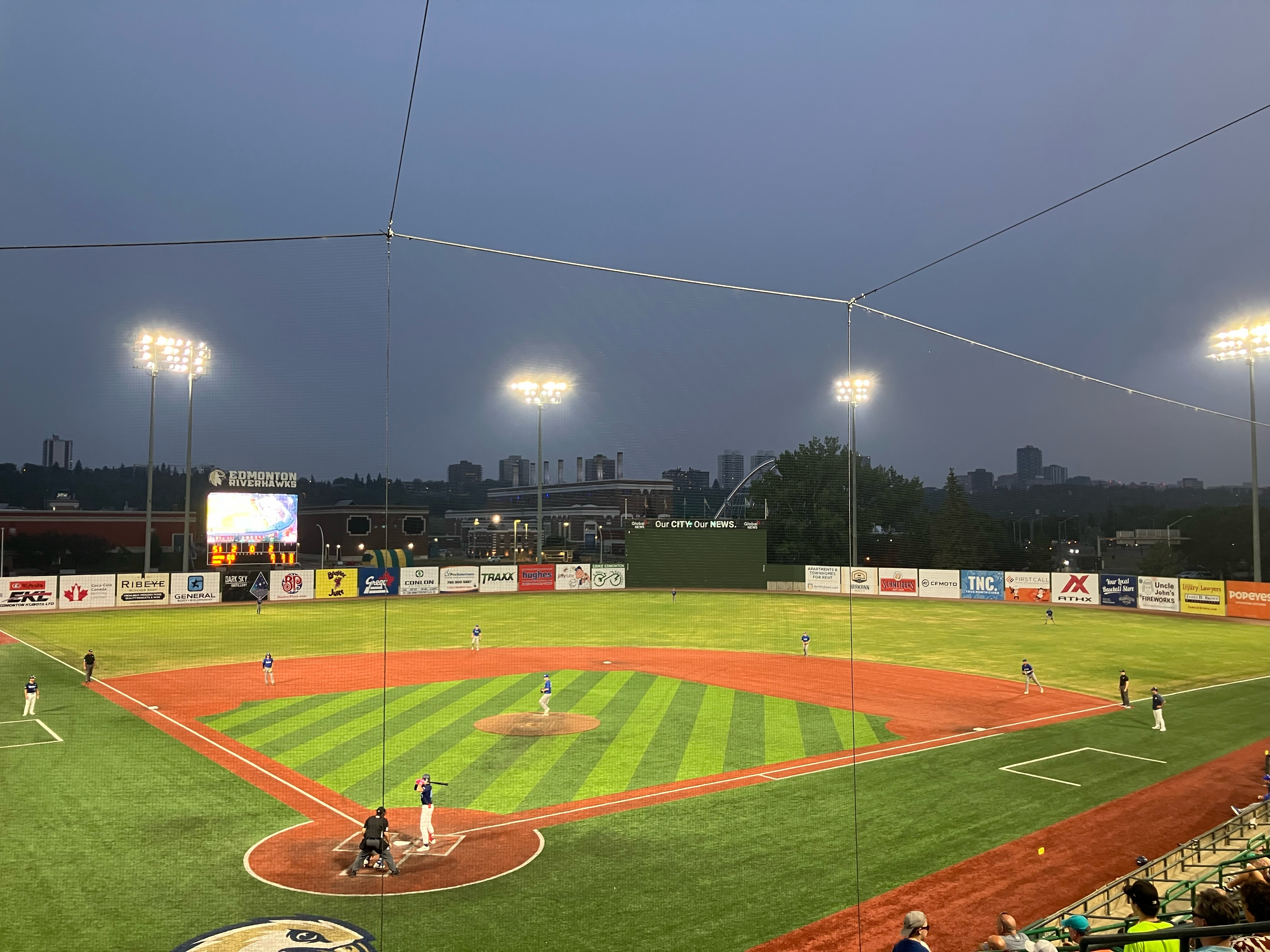
The Edmonton Riverhawks host the Springfield Drifters on July 19, 2024, at RE/MAX Field.

On July 9, Tate Dearing, Vicarte Domingo, Bryce McFeely, Jakob Poturnak, and Michael Soper were selected to represent the Riverhawks in the All Star Game.

On July 14, Sam Kane (Seattle University) was named the league's player of the week. Kane finished the week with thirteen base hits, seven runs batted in, and three home runs.

The Riverhawks improved on their 18–36 record from the previous season, posting a 32–22 record and finishing third in the north division, 2.5 games behind the AppleSox, for their first winning season in franchise history. Jakob Poturnak (Sacramento State) finished the regular season with forty-two runs batted in. Vicarte Domingo (University of British Columbia) finished with five wins on the mound while Halen Knoll (Edmonton Collegiate) threw forty-nine strikeouts and finished with an ERA of 2.54. The Riverhawks lead the league in attendance for the second year in a row. 116,871 total fans attended home games for an average of 4,675 per game.

The Riverhawks qualified for the postseason for the first time in franchise history. As a wildcard qualifier, the Riverhawks faced the Bells in the North Divisional Series. The Riverhawks won their first playoff game in franchise history on August 10 with their 3–1 win, but would ultimately lose the series.

=== 2025 ===
Tate Dearing (Reinhardt) was named player of the week by the league on June 23rd.

On July 8th, it was announced that Jason Green (Niagara), Trent Lenihan (British Columbia), Robert Phelps (Reinhardt) and Max Stagg (Central Arizona) would represent Edmonton in the All Star Game in Bellingham.

Myles Chamberlain (Cloud County Community College) was named pitcher of the week on July 14th.

Pitcher Carson Latimer (Sacramento State) was selected by the Cincinnati Reds in the 12th round of the 2025 Major League Baseball draft. Outfielder Cannon Reeder (Oregon State) was selected by the Philadelphia Phillies in the 18th round. Former Riverhawk Jack Gurevitch was also drafted.

The Riverhawks improved on their 32–22 record from the previous season. The Riverhawks finished first in the North Division with a 34–20 record and clinched the North Division Second Half Championship. Chamberlain lead the league with seven wins on the mound. Green hit nine home runs while Trent Lenihan (British Columbia) finished with an RBI count of 43. Riley Barrett (Uncommitted) finished with four pitching wins. The Riverhawks finished with the best league attendance for the third consecutive year. 131,966 fans attended Edmonton's twenty-seven home games for an average of 4,888 fans per game.

The Riverhawks hosted the Victoria HarbourCats in the North Divisional Series winning in three games for their first ever series win. The Riverhawks hosted the Bellingham Bells in the North Division Championship Game but fell 2–5 to end their season.

=== 2026 ===
The Riverhawks failed to improve on their 34–20 record from the previous season. The team posted a 28–26 record and finished fifth in the north division.

Pitchers David Sheppard and Trey Nance were recipients of the league's Pitcher of the Week award on June 22 and July 27.

Former Riverhawk Tyree Reed participated in the 2026 MLB Draft Combine.

Easton Andrews, Carter Fink, Shiryu Sato, and David Sheppard were selected to represent the Riverhawks at the 2026 WCL All Star Game in Victoria.

Former Riverhawks Mikiah Negrete and Kenneth Ward were selected by the in the 2026 Major League Baseball draft by the Colorado Rockies and Detroit Tigers respectively.

The Riverhawks were eliminated from playoff contention for the first time since 2023 following their series loss in Bellingham to end the season. The team was in a three-way tie with Kelowna and Nanaimo for the final two wildcard spots.

Broadcaster Al Coates was awarded broadcaster of the year by the league on August 17.

== Results by Season ==
League Champions	Division Champions	Playoff Team

Year	League	Division	Finish	Wins	Losses	Win%	GB	Postseason	Manager
2022	WCL	North	5th	25	28	.472	8	Did Not Qualify	Kelly Stinnett
2023	WCL	North	6th	18	36	.333	20.5	Did Not Qualify	Jake Lanferman
2024	WCL	North	3rd	32	22	.593	2.5	Lost North Divisional Series 1–2 (Bellingham)	Jake Lanferman
2025	WCL	North	1st	34	20	.630	--	Won North Divisional Series 2–1 (Victoria); Lost North Division Championship Game 2–5 (Bellingham)	Jake Lanferman
2026	WCL	North	5th	28	26	.518	12	Did Not Qualify	Jake Lanferman

== Playoff Appearances ==
- 2024 Wildcard Berth
- 2025 North Division Second Half Champions
