= Corvallis Knights =

Collegiate summer baseball team in Oregon, US

- Logo

Information
- League: West Coast League (South Division)
- Location: Corvallis, Oregon
- Ballpark: Goss Stadium
- Founded: 1990
- Nickname: "The Evil Empire"
- League championships: 10 (2008, 2011, 2013, 2016, 2017, 2018, 2019, 2021, 2022, 2023)
- Division championships: 15 (2007, 2008, 2009, 2011, 2012, 2013, 2014, 2016, 2017, 2018, 2019, 2021, 2022, 2023, 2026)
- Former name: Aloha Knights (1990-2006)
- Former ballpark: Mt. Hood Community College (1990-2006)
- Colors: Cardinal and Gold
- Mascot: Mack the Knight and Lil' King
- Manager: Brooke Knight (Head Coach)

The Corvallis Knights, founded as the Aloha Knights, are a collegiate summer baseball team located in Corvallis, Oregon. Founded in 1990 in Beaverton by Dan and his brother Joe Segel, the Knights moved to Corvallis from Gresham in 2007. They play in the West Coast League, a college summer wood-bat league where college players and prospects prepare for the pros. The league comprises teams from Alberta, British Columbia, Oregon and Washington. Corvallis plays its home games at Goss Stadium, also the home of the Oregon State Beavers.

The Knights are named after Penny Knight, their top sponsor. Penny is married to Nike co-founder Phil Knight.

Arguably one of the most successful teams in summer collegiate wood bat baseball, the Knights have won 10 league titles and 14 division championships. The Knights best run came between the years of 2016 and 2023 where the team finished each year as both division and league champions. Since joining the WCL, the Knights have never finished with a losing season.

== History ==
=== 2014 ===
The Corvallis Knights put up 35 wins and 19 losses in the 2014 WCL season. The Knights tried to retake their WCL Championship throne but fell short of the title by one game. Corvallis forced the third-ever Game 3 of the WCL Championship Series. The Knights put up Michael Lucarelli and Grant Melker for 54 games tying the WCL record for the most games with a batting appearance—tying Mitchell Gunsolus of the Wenatchee Applesox from 2012 and Cole Norton from the Kitsap Bluejackets in 2011. Also, Grant Melker set the WCL record for the most bases stolen by one player in one season with 29 steals. The Corvallis Knights hit 95 doubles in the 2014 season, setting the record for the most doubles by any one team in one year. They also set the record for the most sacrifice flies and stolen bases, hitting 39 flies and stealing 119 bases in one season, respectively. The Knights kept the records rolling with Jackson Lockwood winning eight games, tying the record of Eli Morgon of the Yakima Valley Pippins in the same year. Corvallis sold 43,938 tickets in the season and hosted 1,292 fans one night.

=== 2015 ===
On February 12, 2015, the Corvallis Knights held a re-branding party and unveiled the new logo for the club. According to logo designer Jason Klein of the San Diego graphic design company Brandiose, the new team logo includes a head of grain as a tribute to the agricultural heritage of the Willamette Valley and the regional affinity for craft brewing. Concurrent with the change, the team officially adopted two new team colors in addition to its traditional cardinal — gold and a pale maize tone described by team officials as "Corvallis cream."

=== 2022 ===
The Knights finished the 2022 regular season first in the South Division with a 39–15 record, the best in the league. The Knights defeated the Pippins 2–1 in the South Division Semifinals and will host the Raptors in the South Division Final. Kiko Romero is sixth in the WCL in runs batted in (34) while Sean Wiese has five wins on the mound. The Knights have seen 61,390 total fans go through the gate.

=== 2024 ===
On June 10, infielder Kevin Takeuchi was selected as the league's player of the week after batting in ten runs and reaching base seventeen times.

On June 17, Takeuchi once again won the award after batting in and scoring sixteen runs while making base seventeen times.

On July 9, Brandon Cabrera, James DeCremer, Tyler Horn, Kaden Segel, Kevin Takeuchi, Blake Wilson, and Ty Yukomoto were selected to represent the Knights in the 2024 all star game in Bellingham.

Former Knight Travis Bazzana was selected as the first overall pick in the 2024 MLB draft by the Cleveland Guardians on July 14.

The Knights made the playoffs for the seventeenth straight season after winning the first half. The Knights swept the Raptors 2–0 in the South Divisional Series but were upset in the South Division Championship Game 1–4 by the Pickles ending their bid at an eighth straight WCL Championship.

=== 2025 ===
On July 8, it was announced that Brock Ketelsen (Stanford) Xavier Rios (CSUN), Maddox Riske (USC) and J'Shawn Unger (Iowa Western Community College) were selected to represent the Knights at the All Star Game in Bellingham.

Former Knight Tyler Bremner was the second overall pick in the 2025 Major League Baseball draft. Bremner was selected by the Los Angeles Angels.

The Knights failed to improve on their 41–13 record from the previous season. The team went 39-15 and finished second in the South Division. Blake Wilson (Washington) finished third with a .348 batting average. Trey Newmann (Portland) finished third in the league with forty-two strikeouts while Zach Johnson (Cal State Northridge) finished with a 3.48 ERA. 37,333 total fans attended the Knights' twenty-six home games for an average of 1,436 fans per game.

The Knights clinched the South Division Second Half Title for their eighteenth straight playoff berth (not counting the 2020 season when the league was shut down due to the COVID lockdowns). The Knights hosted the Elks in the South Divisional Series winning the series two games to one. The Knights travelled to Portland to face the Pickles in the South Division Championship Game but fell 5–6.

=== 2026 ===
Former Knights Jackson Flora and Tyner Horn as well as current Knight Archer Horn participated in the 2026 MLB Draft Combine.

== Results by Season ==
Season	League	Division	Finish	Wins	Losses	Win%	GB	Postseason	Manager
2000	PIL			20	9	.689		Did Not Qualify	Geoff Loomis
2001	PIL			24	5	.827		Did Not Qualify	Geoff Loomis
2002	PIL			17	13	.566		NBC Participant (2-2)	Geoff Loomis
2003	PIL			19	11	.633		Did Not Qualify	Geoff Loomis
2004	PIL			17	19	.566		NBC Champions (7–0)	Geoff Loomis
2005	WCL			36	16	.692			Matt Dorey
2006	WCL			31	16	.659			Brooke Knight
2007	West Coast League	West		38	20	.655		Lost Championship (Moses Lake)	Brooke Knight
2008	WCL	West		39	16	.709		Won Championship (Wenatchee)	Brooke Knight
2009	WCL	West		49	13	.790		Lost Championship (Wenatchee)	Brooke Knight
2010	WCL	West	1st	31	17	.645	0	Lost Division Series 0-2 (Bend)	Brooke Knight
2011	WCL	West	1st	37	17	.685	0	Won Division Series 2-1 (Bend); Won Championship Series 2-0 (Walla Walla)	Brooke Knight
2012	WCL	West	1st	32	22	.592	0	Won Division Series 2-0 (Cowlitz); Lost Championship Series 1-2 (Wenatchee)	Brooke Knight
2013	WCL	South	1st	37	17	.685	0	Won Division Series 2-0 (Medford); Won Championship Series 2-0 (Wenatchee)	Brooke Knight
2014	WCL	South	1st	35	19	.648	0	Won Division Series 2-0 (Bend); Lost Championship Series 1-2 (Bellingham)	Brooke Knight
2015	WCL	South	2nd	32	22	.592	4.5	Lost Division Series 0-2 (Bend)	Brooke Knight
2016	WCL	South	1st	34	20	.630	0	Won Division Series 2-0 (Yakima Valley); Won Championship Series 2-1 (Bellingham)	Brooke Knight
2017	WCL	South	1st	34	20	.630	0	Won Division Series 2-1 (Yakima Valley); Won Championship Series 2-1 (Victoria)	Brooke Knight
2018	WCL	South	2nd	36	18	.667	1	Won Division Series 2-0 (Portland); Won Championship Series 2-0 (Kelowna)	Brooke Knight
2019	WCL	South	1st	42	12	.778	0	Won Division Series 2-1 (Walla Walla); Won Championship Series 2-1 (Victoria)	Brooke Knight
2020	Season cancelled (COVID-19 pandemic)								
2021	WCL	South	1st	37	11	.771	0	Won Division Series 2-0 (Ridgefield); Won Championship Series 2-1 (Yakima Valley)	Brooke Knight
2022	WCL	South	1st	39	15	.722	-	Won South Divisional Series 2-1 (Yakima Valley); Won South Division Championship Game 4-2 (Ridgefield); Won WCL Championship Game 5-0 (Bellingham)	Brooke Knight
2023	WCL	South	1st	39	15	.722	-	Won South Divisional Series 2-1 (Cowlitz); Won South Division Championship Game 4-1 (Portland); Won WCL Championship Game 5-0 (Victoria)	Brooke Knight
2024	WCL	South	1st	41	13	.759	-	Won South Divisional Series 2-0 (Ridgefield); Lost South Division Championship Game 1-4 (Portland)	Brooke Knight
2025	WCL	South	2nd	38	15	.717	5	Won South Divisional Series 2-1 (Bend); Lost South Division Championship Game 5-6 (at Portland)	Brooke Knight
2026	WCL	South	1st	31	23	.574	0	Won Division Series 2-1 (Walla Walla); Won South Division Championship Game 7-2 (Ridgefield); Lost WCL Championship Game 7-8 (at Wenatchee)	Brooke Knight

League champions	Division champions	Playoff Team

== Alumni in Major League Baseball ==
- Tyler Anderson – LHP, Los Angeles Dodgers
- Matt Andriese – RHP, Boston Red Sox
- Matt Boyd – LHP, Chicago Cubs
- Matt Duffy – IF, Chicago Cubs
- Mitch Haniger – OF, Seattle Mariners
- Jace Fry – LHP, Chicago White Sox
- Nick Madrigal – IF, New York Mets
- Adley Rutschman - C, Boston Red Sox
- Brooks Lee - SS, Minnesota Twins

== Media ==
The Knights are broadcast live on Corvallis' KEJO 1240 AM.
