= Brooke Knight =

American baseball coach (born 1972)

Brooke E. Knight (born 20 November 1972) is the current manager of the Sydney Bluesox of the Australian Baseball League. He is best known for leading the Perth Heat to back-to-back ABL Championships in 2011 & 2012 (defeating the Bite and the Melbourne Aces respectively). He is also currently manager and director of baseball operations for the Corvallis Knights, a collegiate summer wood bat baseball team in the West Coast League.

== Playing career ==
A two-sport athlete at Crescent Valley High School, Knight attended Linfield College where he played both baseball and football. After one year at Linfield he transferred to Oregon State University to play both baseball and football for the Beavers. Knight signed with Major League Baseball's Milwaukee Brewers organization in 1995 playing for their rookie affiliate, and was traded to the Pittsburgh Pirates in 1996 to the Augusta GreenJackets affiliate.

== Coaching career ==
Knight began his coaching career in earnest in 2008, and as a rookie Manager, led the Corvallis Knights to their first ever West Coast League Championship. He has led the Knights to subsequent crowns in 2011, 2013, 2016, 2017, 2018, 2019, 2021, 2022, and 2023.

His tenure with the Knights includes directing the team to seven consecutive West Division titles, 13 championship appearances (winning ten), and eight-time West Coast League Coach of the Year honors.

In late 2010 the Perth Heat, of the MLB-funded Australian Baseball League, hired Knight as Manager, where he led them to back-to-back titles for the 2010–11 and 2011–12 seasons. After a season off from the ABL, he returned to coach the Adelaide Bite in 2013-14 and in 2014–15. The Bite won the 2015 regular-season title before losing to Perth in the championship finals. He returned to coach the Heat for the 2019–20 season, and was an assistant coach for Team Australia in 2020 during the KBO Challenge.
