= Todd Haney =

American baseball player (born 1965)

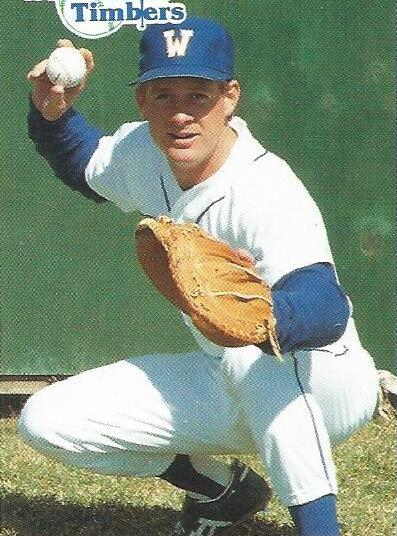
- Haney with the Wausau Timbers c. 1988
- Second baseman
- Born: July 30, 1965 (age 60); Galveston, Texas, U.S.
- Batted: Right Threw: Right

MLB debut
- September 9, 1992, for the Montreal Expos

Last MLB appearance
- September 26, 1998, for the New York Mets

MLB statistics
- Batting average: .244
- Home runs: 3
- Runs batted in: 12
- Stats at Baseball Reference

Teams
- Montreal Expos (1992); Chicago Cubs (1994–1996); New York Mets (1998)

Todd Michael Haney (born July 30, 1965) is an American former second baseman in Major League Baseball who played for the Montreal Expos, Chicago Cubs and New York Mets in parts of five seasons spanning 1992–1998. Listed at 5' 9", 165 lb., Haney batted and threw right-handed. He was born in Galveston, Texas.

Haney attended University of Texas at Austin, where he reached the College World Series while playing for the Texas Longhorns. In 1985, he played collegiate summer baseball with the Harwich Mariners of the Cape Cod Baseball League, and returned to the league in 1986 to play for the Orleans Cardinals. He was selected by the Seattle Mariners in the 38th round of the 1987 MLB draft.

Haney worked as an instructor for a Waco-based select baseball team, the Waco Storm.

Haney has been Head Coach of the Victoria HarbourCats of the West Coast League since 2019, leading the team in the 2019, 2022 and 2023 seasons. The team did not operate during the COVID-19 pandemic seasons of 2020 and 2021. Haney was assistant coach of the HarbourCats in the 2018 season.
