= Kitsap BlueJackets =

Information
- League: West Coast League (2011-2016) (West)
- Location: Bremerton, Washington
- Ballpark: Gene Lobe Field
- Founded: 2004
- Nickname: BlueJackets
- Colors: Blue, Gold, White
- Mascot: Jack the BlueJacket
- Management: MACK Athletics, Matt Acker
- Manager: Matt Cartwright (head coach)

The Kitsap BlueJackets were an amateur baseball team located in Bremerton, Washington. They played in the West Coast League, a collegiate summer baseball league, from 2004 to 2016. Kitsap called the Gene Lobe Field at Kitsap County Fairgrounds and Event Center home.

The BlueJackets' mascot was Jack the BlueJacket.

== History ==
In 1946, local community leaders had a dream about establishing professional baseball on the Kitsap Peninsula. The result was the Bremerton Bluejackets, the county's first and only professional baseball team.

In 2004, another group of baseball entrepreneurs led by Rick Smith, bought the Kitsap Bluejackets and became an inaugural member of the prestigious West Coast League, a collegiate woodbat league founded in 2011.

In 2015, a new ownership group with MACK Athletics and Matt Acker purchased the team. In 2016, ownership relocated the team to Port Angeles, Washington and renamed them the Port Angeles Lefties.

== Notable alumni ==
- Adam Cimber (2010)
- Seth Brown (2013)
- Spenser Watkins (2013)
- Tarik Skubal (2014)
- TJ Friedl (2014)
