= Cowlitz Black Bears =

Baseball team in Longview, Washington, US

- [[File: |frameless|class=pageimage|alt=]] Logo

Information
- League: West Coast League (South)
- Location: Longview, Washington
- Ballpark: David Story Field
- Founded: 2010
- Folded: 2025
- Colors: Burnt orange, black, grey, white
- Mascot: Corby The Bear
- Ownership: Tony Bonacci
- Coach: Brian Burres

The Cowlitz Black Bears were an amateur baseball team located in Longview, Washington. They played in the West Coast League, a collegiate summer baseball league. The league comprises teams from Canada, Oregon, and Washington. The team's home field was David Story Field on the campus of Lower Columbia College.

The Black Bears struggled to find success for a majority of their existence. The Black Bears were only able to compile three winning seasons (2011, 2013 and 2023) and one playoff win (2023).

== History ==
=== 2010 ===
The Black Bears began play as an expansion team in the West Coast League in 2010. In their inaugural season, they were coached by Bryson LeBlanc and managed a record of 18 wins and 30 losses to finish tied for last in their division. The team finished fifth overall in home attendance by drawing 27,669 fans.

=== 2011 ===
The following season, LeBlanc returned as head coach and their record improved to 28 wins and 26 losses, placing them third in the West division. The team narrowly missed the West Coast League playoffs by losing the final game of the season. The attendance also improved to 30,102.

=== 2012: First playoff appearance ===
Tim Matz was hired in September 2011 to replace LeBlanc as head coach after the latter left to accept a full-time college assistant coaching position. With a record of 26 wins and 28 losses, the team made their first playoff appearance by coming in second in the West division. They were eliminated in the first two games by the Corvallis Knights.

=== 2013 ===
The next season, Matz returned as head coach and the Bears repeated their 2011 record with 28 wins and 26 losses, finishing fourth in the South division.

=== 2014 ===
The Black Bears returned with Tim Matz and had a record of 24 wins and 30 losses on the season, finishing third in the South division. The Bears had a season high overall attendance of 31,138. Future big leaguers Ryan Aguilar and Caleb Hamilton played for the team. 2x MLB All Star and Cy Young Award winner Shane Bieber also pitched for the team.

=== 2015 ===
In September 2014, Grady Tweit was named as the team's new head coach to replace Matz who resigned the previous August. They produced a record of 21 wins and 33 losses, finishing fourth in the West division.

=== 2016 ===
The seventh season of Cowlitz Black Bears baseball brought the return of Grady Tweit and a new split season format in which the WCL season was split equally into two parts, with the winner from each division of each half securing a playoff berth. The 54-game league schedule was divided into a first and second half, each 27 games long. In the first half, the Bears finished third in the South division with a record of 12 wins and 15 losses. In the second half, they finished fourth with a record of 11 wins and 16 losses. They completed the entire season with a record of 23 wins and 31 losses, finishing fourth in the South division. The Cowlitz Black Bears also had the honor of hosting the 2016 West Coast League All-Star Game at David Story Field. The South claimed victory over the North, shutting them out by a score of 4–0.

=== 2017 ===
Cowlitz struggled the first half of their eighth season, finishing in fourth with a record of 11 wins and 16 losses. The Bears turned it around in the second half finishing in second place with a record of 16 wins and 11 losses, coming within a game of a playoff berth. For the whole season, they broke even with a record of 27 wins and 27 losses, finishing third overall.

=== 2018 ===
The Black Bears had a rough ninth season, finishing the first half in third with a record of 10 wins and 17 losses. They saw no improvement in the second half by again finishing third with a record of 10 wins and 17 losses. Overall, Cowlitz finished the season with a record of 20 wins and 34 losses, finishing in third for the second year in a row.

=== 2019: 10th Anniversary ===
The 2019 season was the 10th Anniversary of the Cowlitz Black Bears. The Bears repeated their 2018 first half woes by finishing with a record of 10 wins and 17 losses. They kicked it up a notch in the second half, finishing with 14 wins and 13 losses. They ended their anniversary season with an overall record of 24 wins and 30 losses, landing in fifth in the South. The 2019 season would be Coach Grady Tweit's final season with the team.

=== 2020 ===
The 2020 season was canceled due to the coronavirus pandemic. On October 19, the team announced on their website that they had signed Gary Van Tol to become the new head coach. Soon after, Tol accepted a position in professional baseball, ending a brief tenure as a manager with the organization.

=== 2021 ===
On February 9, 2021, The Cowlitz Black Bears announced former MLB player Brian Burres as their new head coach.

=== 2023 ===
The Black Bears named former MLB player Kelly Stinnett as the new head coach. On July 10, Jaron DeBerry was named pitcher of the week. It was a historic season: the Bears made the playoffs for the first time since 2012 and set many franchise records, including 33 total wins and 10 straight wins.

=== 2024 ===
On June 10, Ryan Rembisz was named the league's pitcher of the week after throwing five scoreless innings with eleven strikeouts and only two allowed base hits against Nanaimo.

On July 8, infielder Keaton Grady, who attended Dallas Baptist, was named the league's player of the week after recording ten hits, eleven RBI's, and a grand slam.

On July 9, Dylan Schlaegal was selected to represent the Black Bears in the 2024 All Star Game in Bellingham.

The Black Bears failed to qualify for the postseason.

=== 2025 ===
On July 8, it was announced that Gavin Poffenroth (Skagit Valley College) was selected to represent the Black Bears at the All Star Game in Bellingham.

The Black Bears failed to improve on their 20-33 record from the previous season. The Black Bears went 20-34 and finished eighth in the South Division. 17,363 total fans attended the Black Bears' twenty-seven home games for an average of 643 fans per game.

The Black Bears were eliminated from playoff contention for the second straight season.

2025 was the final season played at David Story Field. The team and Lower Columbia College who owns the ballpark could not come to an agreement over the 2024-25 offseason over how to use renovation funds provided by the state. The team would quietly fold following the season.

== Results by season ==
Season	League	Division	Finish	Wins	Losses	Win%	GB	Postseason	Manager
2020	Season cancelled (COVID-19 pandemic)								
2021	WCL	South	5th	24	24	.500	13		Brian Burres
2022	WCL	South	6th	25	28	.472	13.5		Alan Embree
2023	WCL	South	2nd	33	21	.611	6	Lost Divisional Series 1-2 (Knights)	Kelly Stinnett
2024	WCL	South	6th	20	33	.377	20.5	Did Not Qualify	Kelly Stinnett
2025	WCL	South	8th	20	34	.370	23	Did Not Qualify	Dan Spencer

League champions	Division champions	Playoff Team
