= Victoria HarbourCats =

Summer-collegiate baseball team

- Logo

Information
- League: West Coast League (West)
- Location: Victoria, British Columbia
- Ballpark: Royal Athletic Park (capacity 2,867 baseball, expandable to 5,200)
- Founded: 2012
- Nickname: "Cats"
- League championships: 0
- Division championships: 3 (2017, 2019, 2023)
- Colours: Navy blue, aqua blue, white
- Mascot: Harvey the HarbourCat
- Ownership: Shwing Batter Investment Group (Ken Swanson, Rich Harder, John Wilson, Jim Swanson)
- Management: Jim Swanson (Managing Partner/GM)

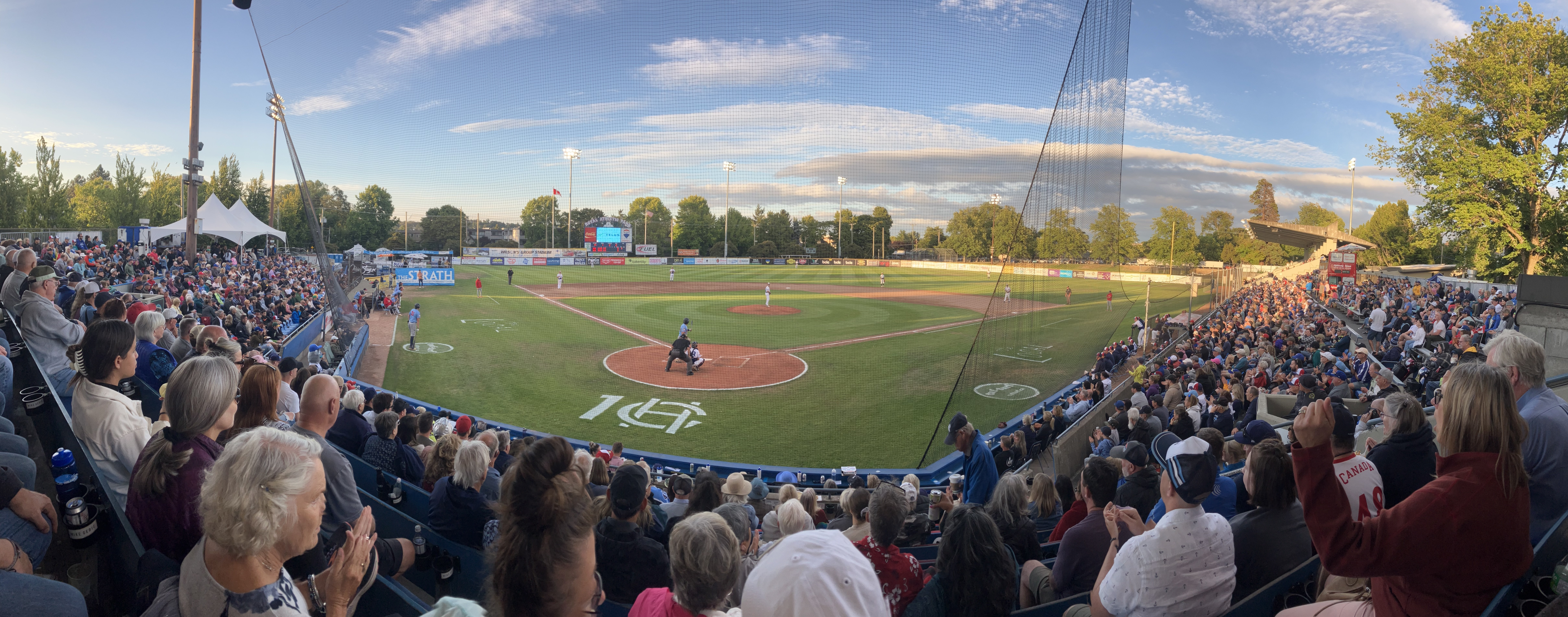
Royal Athletic Park during a HarbourCats game in August 2023

The Victoria HarbourCats are a summer-collegiate baseball team located in Victoria, British Columbia. The HarbourCats play in the West Coast League (WCL), a collegiate summer baseball league. The team's home games are played at Victoria's Royal Athletic Park.

The HarbourCats were founded in 2012 as an expansion team. On October 12, 2012, the team announced it would be called the HarbourCats after a public naming contest was held that received more than 600 submissions. During their time in the WCL, the HarbourCats have won three division championships.

== History ==
=== 2013 ===
The Victoria HarbourCats entered the league with play in the 2013 season and went 22–32, missing the playoffs. A total of 38,793 fans attended home games.

=== 2014 ===
The Victoria HarbourCats went 25–29 in their 2nd season of play in the WCL. Victoria set the record for the most at-bats by a whole team having 1937 at bats in just one season. Victoria drew 45,571 fans through the gates in 30 home games, averaging about 1,576 fans a night. This put Victoria first in WCL attendance in the 2014 season.

=== 2015 ===
The HarbourCats went 29–24 in their 3rd season of play in the WCL. Victoria led the league with a team total of 36 home runs on the season. Victoria drew 49,647 fans through the gates in 26 home games, averaging 1,910 fans a night, a mark which led the West Coast League in attendance for the second straight season.

=== 2016 ===
The HarbourCats set a WCL record for wins in a single season, finishing with a 40–14 regular season mark. They won the WCL's North Division First Half Pennant with a 23–4 record, qualifying for the playoffs for the first time in franchise history, and the first time for a Victoria-based baseball team since 1954. The pennant was clinched in Victoria on June 30 in front of a WCL-record crowd of 5,133. Between June 5 and July 1, the team won a WCL-record 19 consecutive games. Attendance increased for the fourth straight year to an average of 2,239 per game, which ranked ninth in North America among summer league clubs.

=== 2017 ===
On June 8, 2017, Claire Eccles played her first game as part of the HarbourCats, making her the first woman to play in the WCL.

The HarbourCats finished 29-25 and reached the playoffs for the second consecutive season, winning the WCL's North Division Second Half Pennant on the season's final day. They would go on to win the franchise's first-ever playoff game and series over the Kelowna Falcons, qualifying for their first-ever WCL Championship Series, where they would fall in three games to the Corvallis Knights.

=== 2018 ===
The HarbourCats finished 27-27 and failed to reach the playoffs. With an attendance of 3,076 at their final home game, the HarbourCats beat their own WCL attendance regular-season attendance of 60,466, by welcoming a total of 62,599 fans through the gates of Wilson's Group Stadium in 2018.

=== 2019 ===
The HarbourCats 2019 regular season, their seventh, began in June 2019. On July 7, 2019, the team qualified for the playoffs, their third playoff appearance in franchise history. The team beat the Wenatchee AppleSox 2–1 in games in the northern division series, and advanced to the WCL championship final series versus the Corvallis Knights, but lost that series 2–1 in games.

=== 2020 ===
The HarbourCats 2020 regular season, their eighth, was scheduled to begin at home on June 5, 2020. The worldwide COVID-19 crisis forced the cancellation of the 2020 WCL season.

=== 2023 ===
On July 17, Tyler Davis (Fresno State) was named player of the week.

=== 2024 ===
On July 9, Carson Cormier and Tate Shimao were selected to represent the HarbourCats in the 2024 All Star Game in Bellingham.

The HarbourCats made the playoffs for the fourth straight season as a wildcard. The HarbourCats faced the AppleSox in the Divisional Series for the second year in a row. The HarbourCats would win game one 4–2 in Victoria, but would lose games two and three in Wenatchee.

=== 2025 ===
Thomas Bridges (Northwestern) was announced by the league as its pitcher of the week on July 7.

On July 8, J.C. Allen (UC San Diego), Tanner Beltowski (Westmont), Thomas Bridges (Northwestern), Jack Johnson (Baylor) and Logan Shepherd (Mercer) were selected to represent the HarbourCats at the All Star Game in Bellingham.

The HarbourCats improved on their 29–25 record from the previous season. The team went 32-22 and finished third in the North Division. 52,702 total fans attended Victoria's twenty-six home games for an average of 1,950 fans per game.

The HarbourCats qualified for the postseason as a wildcard in their fifth straight appearance (not counting 2020 and 2021 when the team had to suspend operations due to COVID lockdowns). The HarbourCats faced the Edmonton Riverhawks in the North Divisional Series but lost 1–2.

=== 2026 ===
Hudson Lance was named pitcher of the week by the league on June 15th.

== Results by Season ==
League Champions	Division Champions	Playoff Team

Season	League	Division	Finish	Wins	Losses	Win%	GB	Postseason	Manager
2013	WCL	North	4th	22	32	.407	9.5	Did Not Qualify	Dennis Rodgers
2014	WCL	West	2nd	25	29	.463	12	Did Not Qualify	Bob Miller
2015	WCL	West	2nd	29	24	.547	3.5	Did Not Qualify	Graig Merritt
2016	WCL	North	1st	40	14	.741	-	Lost Division Series 0-2 (Bellingham)	Graig Merritt
2017	WCL	North	3rd	29	25	.537	2	Won Division Series 2-0 (Kelowna); Lost Championship Series 1-2 (Corvallis)	Brian McRae
2018	WCL	North	3rd	27	27	.500	8	Did Not Qualify	Brian McRae
2019	WCL	North	1st	39	15	.722	-	Won Division Series 2-1 (Wenatchee); Lost Championship Series 1-2 (Corvallis)	Todd Haney
2020	Season cancelled (COVID-19)								
2021	Season cancelled (COVID-19)								
2022	WCL	North	4th	26	28	.481	7.5	Lost North Divisional Series 0-2 (Bellingham)	Todd Haney
2023	WCL	North	1st	38	15	.717	0	Won North Divisional Series 2-0 (Wenatchee); Won North Division Championship Game 7-6 (Bellingham); Lost WCL Championship Game 0-5 (at Corvallis)	Todd Haney
2024	WCL	North	4th	29	25	.537	5.5	Lost North Divisional Series 1-2 (Wenatchee)	Todd Haney
2025	WCL	North	3rd	32	22	.593	2	Lost North Divisional Series 1-2 (Edmonton)	Todd Haney
2026	WCL	North	6th	26	26	.500	13	Did Not Qualify	Todd Haney

== Playoff Appearances ==
- 2016 WCL North Division First Half Champions
- 2017 WCL North Division Second Half Champions
- 2019 WCL North Division Champions, WCL North Division Second Half Champions, WCL North Division First Half Champions
- 2022 Wildcard Berth
- 2023 WCL North Division Champions, WCL North Division Second Half Champions
- 2024 Wildcard Berth
- 2025 Wildcard Berth

== Ownership ==
Founder and original owner John McLean, who had changed GMs with Holly Jones leaving and Jim Swanson coming in, would lose the team in a civil claim, part of a larger lawsuit involving his other interests, in BC Supreme Court in the Fall 2014, taken over by the Bhootan Group, led by Matthew Stoudt. Bhootan would then sell the team to local ownership led by John Wilson, Jim Swanson, Ken Swanson and Rich Harder, who took care of local debts.

In February 2019, team ownership announced plans to operate an additional WCL team in the Nanaimo market, playing out of Serauxmen Stadium, in 2021. Lights and other stadium upgrades are expected to be completed before the new team can play.

== Notable alumni ==
On April 30, 2017, Nick Pivetta became the first former HarbourCats player to reach the major leagues when the right-hander started for the Philadelphia Phillies against the Washington Nationals. Following 2017, 40 HarbourCats players have been selected in the MLB draft. As of 2017, 14 were playing in an MLB team's organization. In the early part of the 2021 season, two former HarbourCats made their debuts - Alex De Goti for the Houston Astros and Andrew Vaughn for the Chicago White Sox. Opening Day 2023, 2014 Harbourcat Nathan Lukes made his debut.

Listed below are all former HarbourCats players who have played in a Major League Baseball game, alongside the season(s) in which they played for the HarbourCats:

- Alex De Goti (2013, 2014, 2015)
- Nathan Lukes (2014)
- Nick Pivetta (2013)
- Andrew Vaughn (2017)
- Cade Smith (2019)
- Davis Wendzel (2017)
