= Ridgefield Raptors =

Collegiate summer baseball league

- Logo

Information
- League: West Coast League
- Location: Ridgefield, Washington
- Ballpark: Ridgefield Outdoor Recreation Complex
- Founded: 2018
- Colours: Maroon, black, silver, white
- Ownership: Tony Bonacci, Wade Siegel
- General manager: Gus Farah
- Manager: Chris Cota

The Ridgefield Raptors are a collegiate summer baseball team. The Raptors are members of the West Coast League and play their home games at the Ridgefield Outdoor Recreation Complex.

With the exception of their inaugural season, the Raptors have made the playoffs every year they have competed. Despite the regular season success, the Raptors have yet to make an appearance in the WCL Championship Game.

== History ==
=== 2018 ===
In 2018 it was announced that West Coast League had awarded an expansion franchise to be located in southwest Washington. Owner Tony Bonacci, who also headed the Cowlitz Black Bears, sought to expand the league in the metro Portland region. Gus Farah was announced as the General Manager. The club held a name the team contest that drew five hundred entries. The name Raptors was selected following a number of entries related to the Ridgefield National Wildlife Refuge and various birds.

=== 2019 ===
The Raptors finished 3rd in the south division with 27 wins and 27 losses. Michael Hicks (Boise State University) lead the league with 50 runs batted in and 9 home runs. Cameron Repetti (Cal State Fullerton) also brought in 33 batted runs of his own. On the mound, Joey Martin (Kansas State University) led the league in strikeouts (67) and had an ERA of 3.83. The Raptors saw 32,342 total fans in their debut year for an average of 1,198 per game.

=== 2020 ===
Like the rest of the league, The 2020 Raptors season was not played due to COVID-19.

=== 2021 ===
The Raptors finished 2nd in the south division with 26 wins and 22 losses to make their first playoff appearance in history. Their season came to an end in the South Division Championship when they were swept by the defending champion Corvallis Knights however.

The Raptors were dominant in stats in the season. Will Chambers (College of the Canyons) led the league with eight home runs while Caden Connor (Cal State Fullerton) batted in 51 runs. Kody Darcy (Nichols State) drove in 7 home runs while Coby Morales (Cypress College) hit six home runs and finished with a batting average of.349. Reece Hernandez (San Jose State) also batted with an average of.325 not too far behind Morales. John Peck (Pepperdine) hit six home runs and batted 40 runners in. On the mound, Jaren Hunter (Oregon State) finished with four wins and an ERA of 1.93. 21,943 total fans attended in 2021 for an average of 914 per game.

=== 2022 ===
The Raptors finished the regular season with 32 wins and 21 losses. Good for third in the South Division and the first wild card spot. Trent Prokes (Modesto Junior College) led the league with a.415 batting average. Jacob Sharp (Fullerton College) led the league with 14 home runs and also finished with an RBI of 40. Will Chambers (Dixie State College) hit 7 home runs while Doyle Kane (University of California San Diego) finished with a.349 batting average.

The Raptors swept the Pickles in the division series but ultimately fell to the five time defending champion Knights 2–5 in the South Division Championship Game. Jake Tsukada (University of Portland) finished with a batting average of.583 while Safea Villaruz-Mauai (Brigham Young University) finished with an RBI of 4. On the mound, Braiden Youkon (unknown) and Ryan Olbrecht (Wayne State College) each picked up one win. Eastyn Culp (Umpqua Community College) finished with an ERA of 0.00.

After the season, Jacob Sharp was selected as Co-MVP. Travis Welker (Fresno State) was selected as a member of First-Team-All-WCL while Jake Tsukada and Trent Prokes were named to second-team-all-WCL. Doyle Kane, Mikey Kane, Riley McCarthy, Jeter Schuerman, and Safea Villaruz-Mauai received honorable mentions.

=== 2023 ===
On July 5, the Raptors defeated the Portland Pickles 10–3 to clinch their first ever First Half championship. This gives the Raptors their third consecutive playoff appearance and guaranteed home field advantage through the Division Series and South Division Championship Game.

=== 2024 ===
On June 12, pitchers Dylan Stewart, Curtis Herbert, and Mac Elske threw a combined no-hitter in the Raptors' 10-0 win over the Pippins. It was the first no-hitter in team history and the tenth in West Coast League history.

On July 9, Luke Iverson and Dylan Stewart were selected to represent the Raptors in the 2024 All Star Game in Bellingham.

The Raptors qualified for the playoffs for the fourth straight season as a wildcard. The Raptors were swept by the defending champion Knights in the Divisional Series 2-0.

=== 2025 ===
On June 23, Noah Karliner (Cal State Dominguez Hills) was named pitcher of the week.

Karliner and Andrew Estrella (Loyola Marymount) were selected to represent the Raptors at the All Star Game in Bellingham on July 8.

The Raptors failed to improve on their 31-22 record from the previous season. The team went 24-30 and finished sixth in the South Division. Karliner finished second in the league with thirteen home runs and also finished with a.345 batting average and forty runs batted in. Estrella finished with a.340 batting average, nine home runs and forty runs batted in. 35,707 total fans attended the Raptors' twenty-six home games for an average of 1,373 fans per game.

The Raptors were eliminated from playoff contention for the first time since 2018. The Raptors also finished with a losing record for the first time.

=== 2026 ===
Zach Wadas was announced as player of the week by the league on June 22nd.

Former Raptor Cole Tryba participated in the 2026 MLB Draft Combine.

== Results by Season ==
League Champions	Division Champions	Playoff Team

Season	League	Division	Finish	Wins	Losses	Win%	GB	Postseason	Manager
2019	WCL	South	3rd	27	27	.500	15	Did Not Qualify	Chris Cota
2020	Season cancelled (COVID-19 pandemic)								
2021	WCL	South	2nd	26	22	.542	11	Lost Division Series 0–2 (Knights)	Chris Cota
2022	WCL	South	3rd	32	21	.604	6.5	Won Divisional Series 2–0 (Pickles); Lost Division Championship Game 3-5 (Knights)	Chris Cota
2023	WCL	South	3rd	33	21	.611	6	Lost Divisional Series 0–2 (Pickles)	Chris Cota
2024	WCL	South	4th	31	22	.585	9.5	Lost Divisional Series 0-2 (Knights)	Chris Cota
2025	WCL	South	6th	24	30	.444	19	Did Not Qualify	Chris Cota
2026	WCL	South	2nd	31	23	.574	0	Won Division Series 2-1 (Portland); Lost South Division Championship Game 2-7 (at Corvallis)	Chris Cota
