= Nanaimo NightOwls =

Baseball team in Nanaimo, Canada

- Logo

Information
- League: West Coast League
- Location: Nanaimo, British Columbia
- Ballpark: Serauxmen Stadium
- Founded: 2020
- Colours: Navy blue, gold, white
- Mascot: Ney-Te the Night Owl
- Ownership: Jim Swanson, Ken Swanson, John Wilson, Richard Harder
- Manager: Cody Andreychuk

The Nanaimo NightOwls are a Canadian collegiate summer baseball team located in Nanaimo, British Columbia. The Night Owls are members of the West Coast League and began play in 2022; they play their home games at Serauxmen Stadium.

== History ==
The Nanaimo NightOwls were announced to the public on 15 July, 2020 with the ball club's name paying homage to the Nanaimo Owls baseball team of the 1920s, whilst the 'night' in the name refers to the work that the City of Nanaimo's undertook to install floodlights at Serauxmen Stadium. On the same day, the team's mascot was also announced; Ney-te (pronounced 'Nate') the NightOwl was named in honour of former mayor of Nanaimo Frank Ney. A month later, it was announced that former Georgia State Head Coach Greg Frady would serve as the team's inaugural Coach. One month after his appointment, Frady announced his first signings for the club; a quartet of players affiliated with Illinois State, three of whom had Canadian passports. This group was made up of infielders Aidan Huggins and Nick Gile, outfielder Dayton Peters and right-handed pitcher Chase Florendine.

=== Name ===
The Nanaimo NightOwls are unusual among sports teams in that they have two names; the Nanaimo NightOwls and the Nanaimo Bars. Named after the dessert of the same name, Nanaimo Bars had been the most requested name by the fans when asked to name the team. Games that are played during the day will see the club go by the Bars moniker, whilst evening games will be played under the guise of the NightOwls. To this end, the team partnered with supermarket chain Save-On-Foods in order to stock away game concessions stands with Nanaimo bars.

=== 2024 ===
On July 9th, Adison Mattix, Nevan Noonan, Riley Paulino, and Wylie Waters were selected to represent the NightOwls in the 2024 All Star Game in Bellingham.

The NightOwls finished fifth in the north division with a 26-28 record for the second year in a row. Infielder Wylie Waters (University of South Carolina Upstate) finished the season with 9 home runs and 44 runs batted in while pitcher Adison Mattix (Everett Community College) would finish with 48 strikeouts. 35,920 fans attended the NightOwls home games for an average of 1,437 fans per game.

With the Riverhawks clinching a wildcard berth, the NightOwls along with the Lefties and Drifters are the only three teams remaining in the league to never qualify for the playoffs.

=== 2025 ===
On July 8th, Jacob Hayes (Azusa Pacific) and Talan Zenk (Everett Community College) were selected to represent the NightOwls at the All Star Game in Bellingham.

The NightOwls regressed from their 26-28 record from the previous season. The team went 23-31 and finished sixth in the North Division. Hayes finished third in the league with ten home runs. 27,308 total fans attended the NightOwls' twenty-seven home games for an average of 1,011 fans per game.

The NightOwls were eliminated from playoff contention for the fourth straight year. The NightOwls are one of three teams in the league to have never clinch a postseason berth and one of four teams in the league to never clinch a winning record.

=== 2026 ===
The NightOwls improved on their 23-31 record from the previous season. The team posted a 30-24 record and finished third in the North Division. Outfielder Ethan Reynolds lead the league with fifty-three runs batted in and also finished with a .350 batting average; good enough for fifth in the league. Infielder Beau Musser was second overall with twenty-six stolen bases. Pitcher Jaxon McDonald lead the league in saves with eight.

The NightOwls qualified for the postseason for the first time in franchise history as a wildcard. Nanaimo faced off against the Bellingham Bells in the North Division Series and won their first ever playoff game 3-2 in game one. The NightOwls would lose the following two games however to end their season.

== Results by Season ==
League Champions	Division Champions	Playoff Team

Season	League	Division	Finish	Wins	Losses	Win%	GB	Postseason	Manager
2021	Season cancelled (COVID-19 pandemic)								
2022	WCL	North	6th	22	32	.407	11.5	Did Not Qualify	Greg Frady
2023	WCL	North	5th	26	28	.481	12.5	Did Not Qualify	Greg Frady
2024	WCL	North	5th	26	28	.481	8.5	Did Not Qualify	Greg Frady
2025	WCL	North	6th	23	31	.426	11	Did Not Qualify	Cody Andreychuk
2026	WCL	North	4th	30	24	.555	10	Lost Division Series 1-2 (Bellingham)	Cody Andreychuk

== Playoff Appearances ==
- 2026 Wildcard Berth
