= Bellingham Bells =

Team in the West Coast Collegiate Baseball League

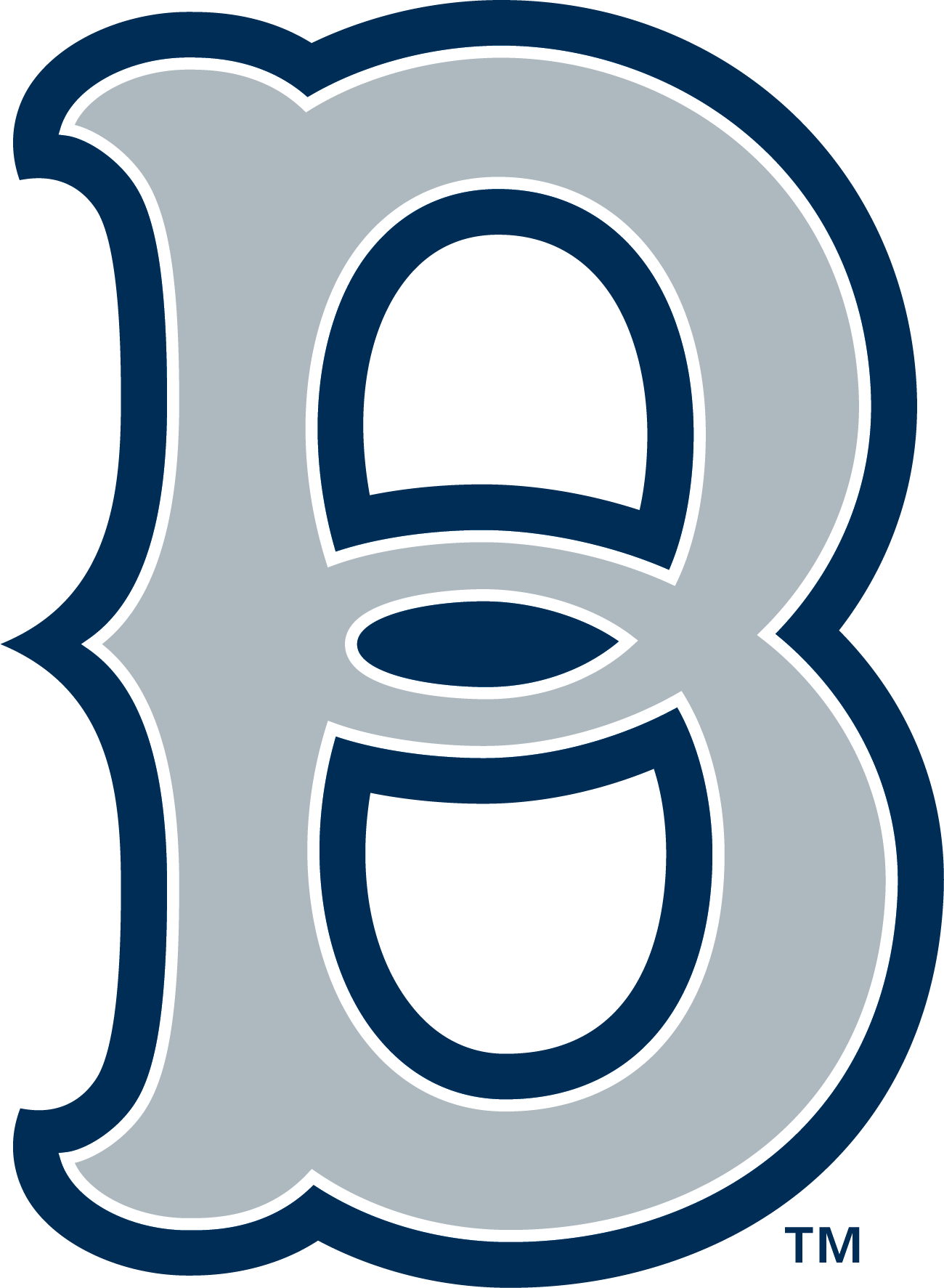
- Logo

Information
- League: West Coast League (Since 2005) (North)
- Location: Bellingham, Washington
- Ballpark: WECU Diamond at Joe Martin Field
- Founded: 1999
- League championships: 3 (1999, 2014, 2025)
- Division championships: 5 (2014, 2015, 2016, 2022, 2025)
- Former league: Pacific International League (1999-2004)
- Colors: Navy Blue, Silver, Baby Blue, Gold
- Mascot: Dinger the Bellinghamster
- Ownership: Bellingham Baseball Club, LP
- President: Stephanie Morrell
- Manager: Alan Regier

The Bellingham Bells are a collegiate summer baseball team in the West Coast League based in Bellingham, Washington. The team is composed of college baseball players from teams around the United States.

Originally founded as an expansion team in the Pacific International League in 1999, the Bells won the league's title and participated in the National Baseball Congress World Series in their first year. The Bells left the PIL after the 2004 season and became a founding member of the West Coast League. During their time in the WCL, the Bells have won two league championships and five division titles.

== History ==
=== The Original Bellingham Bells ===
The Bells take their name from the original Bellingham Bells who played at Battersby Field off and on from the 1930s to 1988. The original Bells came to prominence under the leadership of Joe Martin (the namesake of the ballpark of the current incarnation of the Bells), who helped lead the Bells to 20 National Baseball Congress Washington State titles and multiple top five finishes at the NBC World Series during the height of their semi-pro prominence from 1946 to 1972, when the Bellingham Dodgers brought minor league baseball to Bellingham. The original Bells played in leagues with the Alaska Goldpanners, Humboldt Crabs, Grand Junction Eagles, Anchorage Glacier Pilots, and Wichita Service Auto Glass.

=== 1999 ===
Seeking to put a team together to compete in the Pacific International League, former Skagit Valley College Head Coach, Rob Crawford chose to pay homage to the baseball heroes of the past and name the team the Bells. Wanting to create a "minor league feel', George Daniels (an Attorney from Philadelphia) joined forces with Crawford to bring a team into the PIL. The PIL was a member of the National Baseball Congress (NBC). the 1999 Bells started the season with a surprising 19 wins in a row and eventually went on to win the 11-team PIL and participated in the NBC World Series held in Wichita. The Bells of 1999 heralded local players from Bellingham, Skagit as well as a few players from across the US. Kevin Richardson (Bellingham High School) won MVP honors and set a PIL record for homeruns (19). Sehome Standouts, Ben Demond, Paul Lockhart, Adam Kim, Josh Turell were among local players who made the historic run for the Bells in 1999.

=== 2010 ===
The Bells improved on their 22-26 record from the previous season posting a 25-22 record and finishing third in the north division. Pitcher and Infielder Ben Ruff finished tied for third in the league with three home runs hit. Pitcher Cody Fassold finished second with 55 strikeouts and tied for third with a 1.75 ERA. Pitcher James Wise finished tied for second with five wins. 11,488 fans attended the Bells' 23 home games for an average of 499.

=== 2011 ===
The Bells failed to improve on their 25-22 record from the previous season posting a 21-32 record and finishing third in the north division. Adrian Sampson threw 71 strikeouts and finished with an ERA of 1.71. Andrew Pulido was second in the league with an ERA of 1.57. Andy Fortuna finished with a perfect batting average of 1.000 in the one non league game the Bells played. 16,556 total fans attended for an average of 613 per game.

The Bells failed to make the postseason for the sixth straight year. This was the first season under head coach Gary Hatch.

=== 2012 ===
The Bells improved on their 21-32 record from the previous season posting a 32-22 record and finishing second in the east division. Infielder Johnny Farrington finished the regular season with 28 runs batted in. 26,073 fans attended games for an average of 1,043 per game.

The Bells finished with an undefeated 2-0 record in non-league play. Michael Leach finished with a batting average of .571 while Grant Fink batted in four runs. Randy Button picked up one win. 2,125 fans attended the two non-league games for an average of 1,063.

The Bells made the postseason for the first time since 2005 but fell to the eventual champion AppleSox in three games. Kai Hatch lead the league with a batting average of .500 with Joe Winterburn finishing with one home run and a batting average of .400. Adam Gunn finished on the mound with an ERA of 0.000 in the Bells' one win in the postseason. 811 total fans attended the Bells one home playoff game.

=== 2013 ===
The Bells failed to improve on their 32-22 record from previous season posting a 27-27 record and finishing third in the north division. Third Baseman Alex Calbick (University of Maine Orono) lead the league with a .384 batting average and also finished five home runs. Pitchers Nate Cole (Abilene Christian University) and Andrew Olson (Seattle University) finished with ERA's of 1.63 and 1.84 respectively. 30,641 fans attended league games for an average of 1,135 per game.

The Bells finished in non-league play with a perfect 3-0 record with pitcher John Albert finishing with one win and pitcher Chris VanDyke finishing with a perfect ERA of 0.000. 3,870 fans attended the Bells' three non-league games for an average of 1,290 per game.

The Bells were unable to qualify for the postseason.

=== 2014 ===
The Bellingham Bells became the 4th team in WCL history to win a championship, going 37-17 for the season. David Bigelow set a WCL record for most games played, with 29 games in the season. As a whole team, the Bells had 20 saves on the season setting the record for the most saves by any team in WCL history. Their 0.202 opponents' batting average as a team tied the record set by the 2005 Aloha Knights. Bellingham saw 47,307 fans in the seats at Joe Martin Field in just 32 home games, with an average of 1,478 people per night.

=== 2015 ===
Following the WCL Championship Season, the Bells were looking to defend their title. Though they went 33-21 on the season, they were unable to make it back to the playoffs. The highlight of the season though was the 2015 WCL All-Star Game, hosted by the Bells at Joe Martin Field. The Bells were able to represent themselves at the game by having six players in the All-Star Game. These players include Justin Calomeni (now with the Colorado Rockies organization), Andrew Kemmerer, Bronson Larsen, Andrew Reichenbach, Dustin Breshears, and Aaron Stroosma. The Bells finished the 2015 season fourth in attendance, with 34,435 attendees to Joe Martin Field.

=== 2016 ===
The Bells made it back to the WCL Championship Series after going 32-22 in the regular season. The North Division Champs faced the Corvallis Knights of the South Division for the title in a hard-fought three-game series. Even though the Knights ended up winning the title (2 games to 1), the Bells still had a very successful season overall. Shane Hanon (Marshall University) was crowned WCL Batting Champ, finishing the season with a .331 batting average. The Bells also had one of their standout pitchers from the 2015 and 2016 season, Spencer Howard, drafted 45th overall in the 2016 MLB Draft to the Philadelphia Phillies and is #20 on their Top 30 prospect list.

=== 2017 ===
Despite falling one game short of the playoffs in 2017 after going 31-23 on the season, the fight for the post season provided a variety of very dramatic endings. Kyle Stowers (Stanford) provided two occasions where he was responsible for the walk-off hit to win the game. A non-league game ended in a Home Run Derby tie-breaker after extra innings, including an exciting finish and game-winning dinger by Chase Illig (West Virginia). Illig also was awarded Player of the Week mid-season, set the record for most home runs during the WCL season at 15 and was awarded WCL Player of the Year Honors. Hometown kid, and 2019 5th round draft pick Austin Shenton, was the WCL Batting Champ, finishing the season with a .409 batting average. The attendance at Bells games also grew in 2017, finishing third in overall attendance, 36,569, which averages to 1,407 fans per game.

=== 2018 ===
The Bells dominated the WCL north in 2018 going 35-19 and winning both the first and second half titles for their division. The Bells had many stand out performers on their squad, including Matt McLain (UCLA) who was named the WCL top prospect as an incoming freshman. The Bells were well represented in the WCL All Star Game with Justin Armbruester (PLU) being the winning pitcher, Taylor Davis (Gonzaga), Bellingham local Ernie Yake (Gonzaga), and team homerun leader Matt James (Notre Dame) all representing the team. The team also boasted 3 1st team (Ernie Yake SS, Nick Nastrini SP (UCLA), and Theron Kay RP (Cal-State Northridge), and 3 2nd team All WCL players (Zach Needham 1B (Lewis-Clark State), Taylor Davis RP, and Justin Armbruester SP). The first round of the playoffs featured a matchup between the Bells and the Kelowna Falcons, where the Bells were defeated in the deciding third game of the series. There was a large spike in attendance as the Bells saw a rise in popularity in 2018, with 51,635 fans making it to 35 for an average crowd of 1,475, good for third in the WCL.

=== 2019 ===
The 2019 season proved to be an up and down campaign for the team. The Bells came within one game of winning the first half WCL north crown to put them in the playoffs, losing a heartbreaker to WCL North champion Victoria in the final game of the first half. The team's first half performance produced 5 all stars with Guthrie Morrison OF (Gonzaga), Jack Machtolf OF (Gonzaga), Troy Viola 3B (San Jose St), Jimmy Chatfield RP (Yale), and Nick Proctor SP (Cal - Berkeley) all representing the squad. Troy was also invited to participate in the home run derby and ended up leading the team with 8 homers on the year. The second half saw many new faces on a Bells squad that fought hard, but in the end was not able to make the WCL playoffs. Nick Proctor was a member the All WCL first team, while Jimmy Chatfield was named to the All WCL second team. The community in Bellingham rallied around the Bells, packing Joe Martin with 50,344 fans in 28 games for an average of almost 1,800 fans a game.

=== 2020 ===
The 2020 season was cancelled due to the COVID-19 pandemic.

=== 2021 ===
The Bells introduced new branding prior to the start of the season. The color scheme was updated with Northwest Green being removed.

The West Coast League and Bells returned for the 2021 season after COVID-19 shut down the league the previous season. The Bells finished second in the North Division with a 24–24 record. The Bells made it back to the postseason but fell in the division series to the Pippins 1-2. The Bells finished third in league attendance with 51,248 total tickets sold for an average of 1,464 fans per game.

=== 2022 ===
The 2022 Bells finished first in the WCL North division with 33 wins and 20 losses. Pitcher and "Bell of the Year" Trevin Hope led the league with an ERA of 2.64 while Ryan Beitel threw a 3.57 ERA and won five games on the mound. The Bells saw 62,979 total fans for an average of 1,968 per game, third overall in the league.

The Bells swept the HarbourCats in the divisional series and defeated the AppleSox in the division championship game 5-2 to make the championship for the first time since 2016. The Bells were shut out by the Corvallis Knights 0-5 in the championship.

After the season, Hope was named WCL Pitcher of the Year. Christopher Campos who played for the Bells in the first half of the season was drafted by the Los Angeles Dodgers. Former Bell Seth Martinez won the World Series that fall as part of the Houston Astros.

=== 2023 ===
On August 25, 2022, former Bells coach Jim Clem was announced as the team manager for the 2023 season.

Former Bell Matt McLain made his debut for the Cincinnati Reds on May 15.

On June 19, Jack Erdman was honored by the league as one of the two selected players of the week. Erdman was on the mound for five innings against the Kelowna Falcons allowing no runs, ten strikeouts, and only two base hits.

On July 6, the Bells clinched their second consecutive north division first half championship and third consecutive playoff berth following their 7-5 comeback win against the NorthPaws.

Four former Bells were selected in the 2023 MLB Draft. The Detroit Tigers drafted 2021 Bell of the Year Bennett Lee while the Houston Astros drafted Joey Dixon. Will Simpson and Diego Barrera were picked up by the Oakland Athletics. Will McGillis who went undrafted signed with the Los Angeles Angels.

The Bells improved on their 32-20 record from the previous season finishing 35-18, but they struggled in the second half and finished third in the North after winning the First Half with the league's best 20–7 record. Ryan Beitel finished with five wins on the mound while Daniel Paret threw 43 strikeouts. The Bells saw 58,220 total fans for an average of 2,156 per game.

The Bells swept the Falcons in the division series but fell on the road against the HarbourCats 6-7 after leading 5-0. Coleman Schmidt and Daryl Ruiz each hit one home run while Andrew Valdez brought in four runs. Sheldon Egger and Ryan Beitel finished the postseason with one win on the mound. Beitel also threw seven strikeouts and finished with an ERA of 0.00 alongside Trevor Moore. Despite only hosting one home playoff game (game 2 of the division series), the Bells finished third in attendance for the playoffs with 2,612 total fans attending.

=== 2024 ===
On September 21, 2023, the team announced Jim Clem would retire from his role as head coach after twelve seasons with the team Bob Ralston was announced as the new manager on October 19.

On February 17, it was announced that the 2024 WCL All Star Game would be hosted by the Bells. This is the first time the Bells have hosted the All Star Game since 2015.

On July 9, Josh Flaugher, Nate Kirkpatrick, Roman Martin, Jacob Meija, Conner Smith, and Tyler Van Dyke were selected to represent the Bells in the All Star Game.

On July 14, Tyler Van Dyke (Stetson University) was named the league's pitcher of the week. Van Dyke threw for six innings and only allowed two base hits against the NightOwls the previous Friday. That same day, former Bell Malcolm Moore was drafted by the Texas Rangers in the first round.

The Bells failed to improve on their 35-18 record from the previous season posting a 32-22 record and finishing second in the north division 2.5 games behind the AppleSox. Nate Kirkpatrick (Virginia Commonwealth) finished with a .327 batting average and with 35 runs batted in. Jacob Mejia (Cal State San Bernardino) hit six home runs and was responsible for 40 runs batted in. The Bells were fourth in league attendance with 67,147 attending for an average of 2,487 fans per game.

The Bells qualified for the playoffs for the fourth straight season as a wildcard. The Bells faced the Riverhawks in the North Divisional Series winning in two games. The Bells travelled to Wenatchee to face the AppleSox in the North Division Championship Game losing in a 0-1 shutout. Pitcher Lathan Haywood (Edmonds Community College) threw for an ERA of 0.000 and picked up the win in his one appearance in the playoffs while pitcher Nic Pederson (UC Santa Barbara) earned seven strikeouts.

On September 19, Ralston stepped down for personal reasons. Five days later, the team announced that former AppleSox coach Ed Knaggs had taken the helm for the 2025 season. Knaggs coached the AppleSox from 2001 to 2014 and also had two stints as assistant coach for the Corvallis Knights. Knaggs won six championships with Wenatchee and four with Corvallis. The Bells also announced that Jim Clem would be returning as the team's pitching coach.

On December 16, it was announced that the WCL had awarded Bellingham the All Star Game for the second straight season.

=== 2025 ===
Chihiro Sato was named the league's pitcher of the week on June 9.

The Bells clinched the North Division first half title and their fifth straight playoff appearance on July 1 following Wenatchee's loss to Kamloops.

On July 8, it was announced that Devyn Hernandez (Cal State San Bernardino), Nate Kirkpatrick (VCU), Andrew Lamb (USC), Brock Sell (Stanford) and Preston Watkins (Texas A&M Corpus Christi) were selected to represent the Bells in the 2025 All Star Game.

Pitcher Ty Van Dyke (Stetson) was drafted by the St. Louis Cardinals in the tenth round of the 2025 Major League Baseball draft. Former Bells players Hunter Alberini, Will Cresswell, Cody Delvecchio and Ryan Heppner were also drafted.

The Bells improved on their 32-22 record from the previous season. The team finished with a 33-21 record and took second in the North Division. Watkins finished with forty strikeouts. 69,291 total fans attended Bellingham's twenty-seven home games for an average of 2,566 fans per game.

The Bells hosted the AppleSox in the North Divisional Series and won the series two games to one. The Bells travelled to Edmonton to face the Riverhawks in the North Division Championship Game winning 5-2. The Bells traveled to Portland to face the Pickles in the WCL Championship Game winning 2-1.

=== 2026 ===
Manager Ed Knaggs departed from Bellingham on December 2nd, 2025 after accepting an assistant coaching position at Gonzaga University. On February 5th, 2026, it was announced that former Chicago White Sox scout Alan Regier would become the team's new manager.

The Bells improved on their 33-21 record from the previous season. The team went 36-18 and finished second in the north division. Infielder Noah Cassie finished fourth in the league with eight home runs hit.

Former Bells Roman Martin and Dean West were invited to the 2026 MLB Draft Combine.

Aspen Alexander, Noah Cassie, Charlie Decker, Jaden Jackson, and Jake Lyall represented the Bells at the WCL All Star Game in Victoria. Lyall was responsible for a sacrifice fly in the North All Stars' 4-5 loss.

Former Bells Roman Martin, Dean West, and Issac Yeager were selected in the 2026 Major League Baseball draft by the Athletics, Toronto Blue Jays, and Chicago White Sox respectively. Furthermore, Trevor Moore signed as an undrafted free agent with the Washington Nationals.

The Bells qualified for the postseason for the sixth straight season as a wildcard. The Bells hosted the Nanaimo NightOwls in the North Division Series winning two games to one. The Bells travelled to Wenatchee to face the AppleSox in the North Division Championship Game but were blown out 4-18 to end their title defense.

== Results by season ==
League champions	Division champions	Playoff Team

Season	League	Division	Finish	Wins	Losses	Win%	GB	Postseason	Manager
1999	Pacific International League			25	4	.862		PIL Champions; T-11th National Baseball Congress World Series	Rob Crawford
2000	PIL			11	19	.366		Did Not Qualify	Rob Crawford
2001	PIL			15	14	.517		Did Not Qualify	Dan Newell
2002	PIL			21	21	.500		Did Not Qualify	Dan Newell
2003	PIL			13	17			Did Not Qualify	Dave Wong
2004	PIL			21	15	.583		Did Not Qualify	Sean Linville
2005	West Coast League			17	19	.472		Lost Championship (Wenatchee)	Sean Linville
2006	West Coast League			11	31	.261		Did Not Qualify	Kevin Frady
2007	West Coast League			16	25	.390		Did Not Qualify	Kevin Frady
2008	West Coast League			17	25	.404		Did Not Qualify	Brandon Newell
2009	WCL			22	26	.458		Did Not Qualify	Brandon Newell
2010	WCL	West	3rd	25	22	.532	5.5	Did Not Qualify	Kevin Matthews
2011	WCL	East	3rd	21	32	.396	17.5	Did Not Qualify	Gary Hatch
2012	WCL	East	2nd	32	22	.593	5	Lost Division Series 1–2 (Wenatchee)	Gary Hatch
2013	WCL	North	3rd	27	27	.500	4.5	Did Not Qualify	Gary Hatch
2014	WCL	West	1st	37	17	.685		Won Division Series 2–0 (Yakima Valley); Won Championship Series 2–1 (Corvallis)	Jeff James
2015	WCL	West	1st	33	21	.611	0	Lost Division Series 1–2 (Kelowna)	Jeff James
2016	WCL	North	2nd	32	22	.593	8	Won Division Series 2–0 (Victoria); Lost Championship Series 1–2 (Corvallis)	Mike Gange
2017	WCL	North	3rd	31	23	.574	0	Did Not Qualify	Greg Goetz
2018	WCL	North	1st	35	19	.648	0	Lost Division Series 1–2 (Kelowna)	Bob Miller
2019	WCL	North	3rd	25	27	.581	13	Did Not Qualify	Bob Miller
2020	Season cancelled (COVID-19 pandemic)								
2021	WCL	North	2nd	24	24	.500	5	Lost North Division Series 1–2 (Yakima Valley)	Adam Geaslen
2022	WCL	North	1st	32	20	.623	0	Won North Division Series 2–0 (Victoria); Won North Division Championship Game 4–2 (Wenatchee); Lost WCL Championship Game 0–5 (at Knights)	Adam Geaslen (First Half), Haydan Hastings (Second Half)
2023	WCL	North	3rd	35	18	.660	3	Won North Division Series 2–0 (Kelowna); Lost North Division Championship Game 6–7 (at Victoria)	Jim Clem
2024	WCL	North	2nd	32	22	.593	2.5	Won North Division Series 2–1 (Edmonton); Lost North Division Championship Game 0–1 (at Wenatchee)	Bob Ralston
2025	WCL	North	1st	33	21	.611	1	Won North Division Series 2–1 (Wenatchee); Won North Division Championship Game 5–2 (at Edmonton); Won WCL Championship Game 2–1 (at Portland)	Ed Knaggs
2026	WCL	North	2nd	36	18	.667	4	Won North Division Series 2–1 (Nanaimo); North Division Championship Game 4–18 (at Wenatchee)	Alan Regier

== Playoff Appearances ==
- 2026 Wildcard Berth
- 2025 North Division First Half Champions, North Division Champions, and West Coast League champions
- 2024 Wildcard Berth
- 2023 North Division First Half Champions
- 2022 North Division First Half Champions and North Division Champions
- 2021 North Division Second Half Champions
- 2018 North Division Champions
- 2016 North Division Champions
- 2015
- 2014 West Coast League Champions and WCL West Division Champions
- 2012
- 1999 PIL Champions and National Baseball Congress World Series Participant

== Broadcasting ==
Bells home games are broadcast on the West Coast League's official streaming site. Video broadcasts of home games can be watched on the Bells YouTube channel and radio broadcasts at home are on the Bells Mixlr channel. Zen Hill is the current broadcaster.

== Notable alumni ==
- Kevin Richardson (2000–02)
- Jeff Francis (2002)
- Ty Taubenheim (2002)
- Eddie Kunz (2005)
- Anthony Claggett (2004)
- Marc Rzepczynski (2004)
- Stephen Fife (2007)
- Sean Halton (2008)
- Wynton Bernard (2010)
- Adrian Sampson (2011)
- Michael Rucker (2013–14)
- Seth Martinez (2014)
- Spencer Howard (2015–16)
- Auston Shenton (2016–17)
- Kyle Stowers (2017)
- David Bañuelos (2018)
- Matt McLain (2018)
- Nick Nastrini (2018)
