= West Coast League =

Collegiate summer baseball league

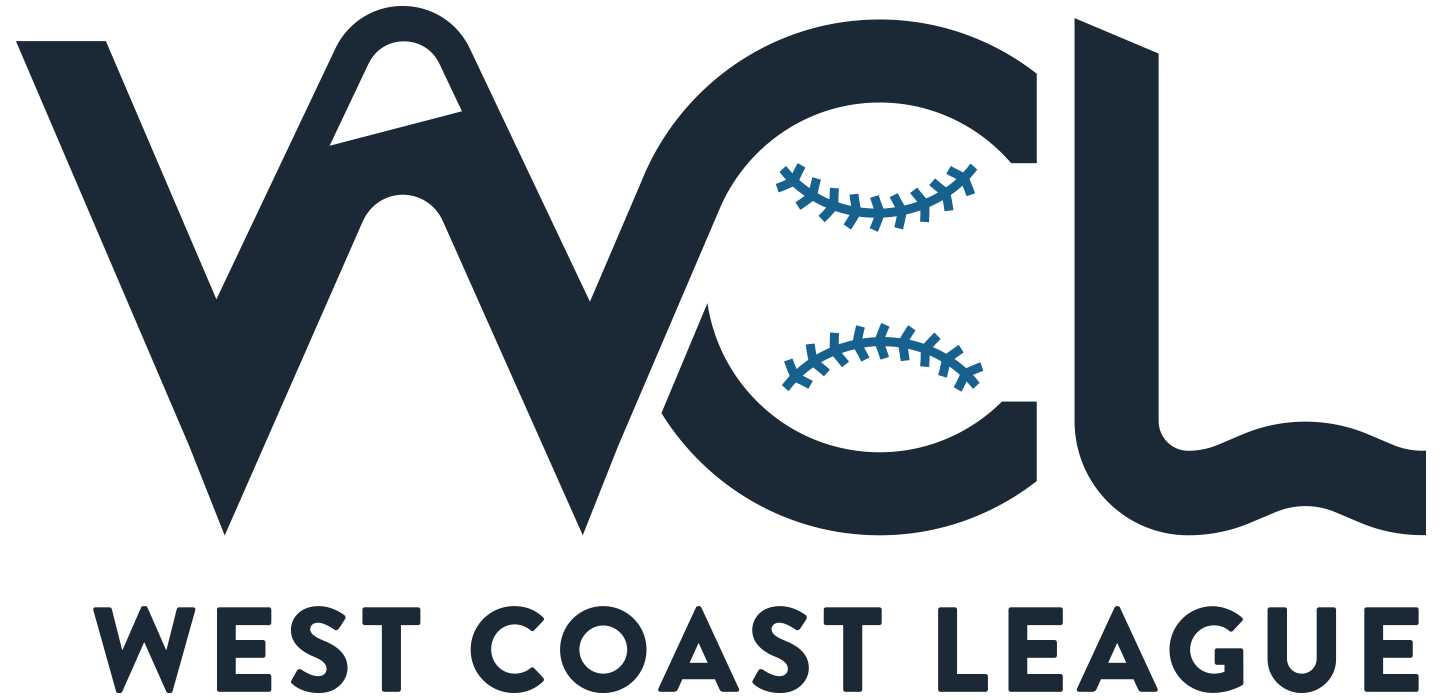
- Sport: Baseball
- Founded: 2005
- Commissioner: Rob Neyer
- No. of teams: 16
- Countries: United States; Canada
- Most recent champion: Wenatchee AppleSox (6th Title)
- Website: westcoastleague.com

The West Coast League (WCL) is a collegiate men's summer baseball wooden bat league founded in 2005, comprising teams from Washington, Oregon, British Columbia, and Alberta. The WCL was previously named the West Coast Collegiate Baseball League (WCCBL), but in 2008 it was renamed as the West Coast League. The league is designed to develop college talent, and only current college-eligible players are allowed to participate. The West Coast League has produced dozens of professional players, including a number of major leaguers. League teams are operated similarly to professional minor-league teams. The WCL's season typically runs from early June through the middle of August.

== Current teams ==
Division	Team	City	Stadium	Seating Capacity
North	Bellingham Bells	Bellingham, WA	Joe Martin Field	1,800
North	Edmonton Riverhawks	Edmonton, AB	RE/MAX Field	9,200
North	Kamloops NorthPaws	Kamloops, BC	NorBrock Stadium	1,500
North	Kelowna Falcons	Kelowna, BC	Elks Stadium	1,250
North	Nanaimo NightOwls	Nanaimo, BC	Serauxmen Stadium	1,500
North	Port Angeles Lefties	Port Angeles, WA	Civic Field	3,000
North	Wenatchee AppleSox	Wenatchee, WA	Paul Thomas Sr. Field	1,200
North	Victoria HarbourCats	Victoria, BC	Royal Athletic Park	4,247
South	Bend Elks	Bend, OR	Vince Genna Stadium	3,500
South	Corvallis Knights	Corvallis, OR	Goss Stadium at Coleman Field	3,587
South	Marion Berries	Salem, OR	Chemeketa baseball field	1,500
South	Portland Pickles	Portland, OR	Charles B. Walker Stadium at Lents Park	1,566
South	Ridgefield Raptors	Ridgefield, WA	Ridgefield Outdoor Recreation Complex	2,700
South	Springfield Drifters	Springfield, OR	Hamlin Sports Complex	2,200
South	Walla Walla Sweets	Walla Walla, WA	Borleske Stadium	2,376
South	Yakima Valley Pippins	Yakima, WA	Yakima County Stadium	3,000

North Division, South Division

== Former teams ==
- Aloha Knights: 2005–2006 (now Corvallis Knights)
- Cowlitz Black Bears: 2010–2025
- Gresham GreyWolves: 2015–2017 (now Portland Pickles)
- Kitsap BlueJackets: 2005–2016 (now Port Angeles Lefties)
- Klamath Falls Gems: 2011–2015 (Gresham GreyWolves)
- Medford Rogues: 2013–2015
- Moses Lake Pirates: 2006–2010
- Spokane RiverHawks: 2005–2009

== History ==
2005–2009

In 2005 the teams played 42 games. For the 2007 season, this was the first year that the WCL used divisions. They separated the league into two divisions, East and West, based on geographical location. The playoffs worked in an odd way. The top two teams in the standings at the end of the season would playoff a best 2 out of 3 in both divisions. Then, the winners of the sets would playoff in the championship series, also a best 2 out of 3. In 2009, the league expanded the schedule to 48 games, at the same time going to an unbalanced schedule. Since 2012, the West Coast League has scheduled 54 league games for each team (with games against non-league opponents not counted in standings).

2010

In 2010 the league added Longview/Kelso (Cowlitz), Washington for the 2010 season, along with Walla Walla, Washington, which in turn cause a balanced schedule. The Moses Lake Pirates ceased operations following the 2010 season.

2011

In 2011 the league expanded to Klamath Falls, which in turn caused a 54-game unbalanced schedule. Also, in the Summer of 2011 the Wenatchee Applesox won the East Division Pennant, and the Walla Walla Sweets came in second and beat the Applesox in the Division Playoffs to go on to play the Corvallis Knights where they lost 2 games to 0. In the West Division the Corvallis Knights won the Pennant and the Bend Elks were 8 games behind them but lost 2–0 in the Divisional games.

2012

In 2012, the Wenatchee AppleSox won the East Division after topping the Bellingham Bells in the first round of the playoffs. At the same time, in the West Division the Corvallis Knights defeated the Cowlitz Black Bears. In the league's championship series, the AppleSox beat the Knights and captured their fifth league title.

2013

In the 2013 season the league changed from an East/West division format to a North/South division format because of further league expansion, of the Victoria HarbourCats, and the Medford Rogues, which brought the number of teams to 11. Also, in 2013 records were set and matched. Walla Walla Sweets pitcher Sean-Luke Brija matched the league record in saves, with 13 outstanding saves in the 2013 season. It was the first year an expansion team, in their first year, made the playoffs. The Medford Rogues made the playoffs by a tie, and winning their last 3 regular season games but, they lost their Cinderella Story season to the Corvallis Knights, beating them 2 games to nothing in the South Division playoffs. Also, the other expansion team, the Canadian Victoria HarbourCats, set a single game and All-star game attendance record of 4,210 in viewing. Finally, history was made in Kitsap after the last out of the top of the ninth when Spenser Watkins threw a spectacular perfect game, the first in West Coast League history.

2014

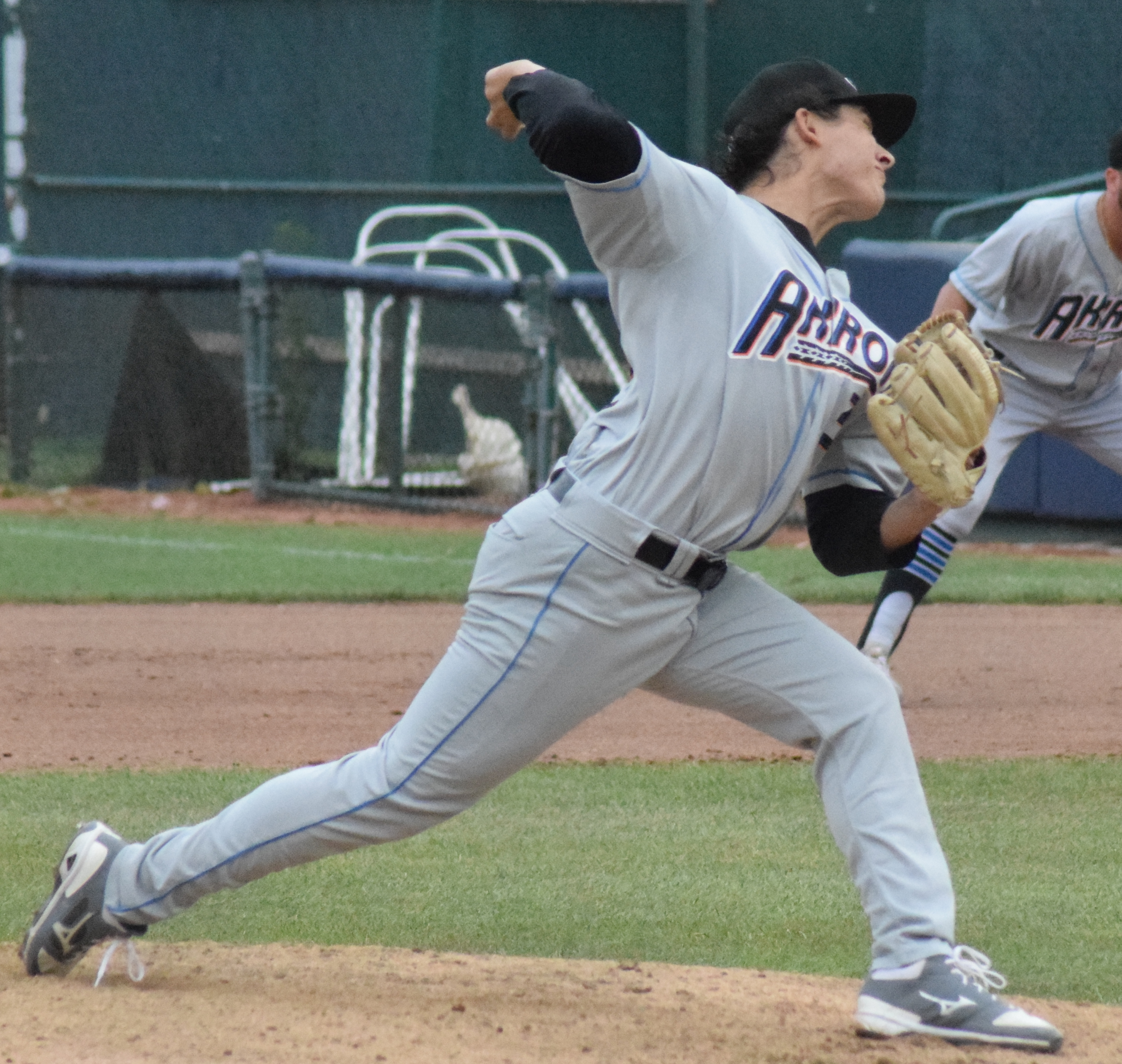
Eli Morgan

In 2014 the Yakima Valley Pippins came on board, giving the WCL their twelfth team. Future major leaguer Eli Morgan was 8-0 for them. Also, in the 2014 year, because of the expansion of Yakima, the WCL restructured their league format for the 4th time in its history, moving to a 3-division format, with East, West, and South Divisions. The playoff format adopted was similar to the MLB format, with only one wild card instead of two. The teams are shown in their respective geographical division in the Team Table below.

The play-off race came down to the last 2 days of league play with a race between Bend and Wenatchee for the first WCL Wild-card spot. Bend edged Wenatchee by just 1 game, causing Wenatchee to miss the playoffs for the first time. Yakima, Bellingham, and Corvallis won their divisions and set the field for the first three-division WCL playoff. The first round playoff pairings were Bellingham vs. Yakima and Corvallis vs. Bend. Both Corvallis and Bellingham won their first 2 games and advanced to the WCL Championship series. Bellingham won both games 2 and 3 of the series, making them the 4th team to ever win the WCL Championship.

2015

In 2015, the West Coast League saw its fifth league champion, the Bend Elks. Kelowna, Bellingham, Bend, and Corvallis advanced to the playoffs, in which Bend swept both Corvallis and Kelowna to capture their first WCL championship.

2016

In the 2015–2016 off-season, the Medford Rogues left the WCL and joined the Great West League. Also, the league announced that the Klamath Falls team would leave the league, with its place taken by a new team based in Gresham, Oregon. On December 4, 2015, the Gresham Baseball Club announced that the team would be named the Gresham GreyWolves.

In 2016, the Victoria HarbourCats set a single-season record for wins with 40, breaking the previous record of 39 (2011 Wenatchee AppleSox). Victoria also broke all three attendance records by having the highest attendance in a single game, season total, and game average. They had 60,466 total fans through the gates, averaging 2,239 a night, with a record 5,133 in one game on June 30 against the Kelowna Falcons.

In the new split-season playoffs format, Victoria won the first half in the North with a 19-game winning streak, and tied Bellingham for the second-half lead, with the Bells holding the tiebreaker by virtue of winning the season series. In the South, the first half was won by the Corvallis Knights, while the second half was won by the Yakima Valley Pippins. Both Corvallis and Bellingham swept their first-round playoff series, setting up a rematch of 2014's WCL Championship Series. The 2016 edition saw Corvallis win a thrilling Game 3 and capture their fourth championship, and first of seven consecutive championships from 2016 to 2023.

2017

On June 8, 2017, Claire Eccles played her first game as part of the Victoria HarbourCats, making her the first woman to play in the WCL.

Also in 2017, the Kitsap BlueJackets went under new management, and were replaced by the Port Angeles Lefties. Corvallis went on to win its second consecutive and fifth overall title.

2018

In 2018, the Gresham GreyWolves were rebranded as the Portland Pickles under new management. The Ridgefield Raptors also joined the West Coast League, bringing the total number of teams to 13. Corvallis went on to win its third consecutive and sixth overall title.

2019

In 2019, Corvallis won its fourth consecutive and seventh overall title.

2020

The West Coast League canceled its 2020 summer collegiate season due to the COVID-19 pandemic.

2021

In 2021, the Springfield Drifters, Nanaimo NightOwls, and Edmonton Riverhawks announced plans to join the West Coast League, bringing the total number of teams to 16. The WCL split back into two divisions of eight teams apiece for the North and South regions.

However, five Canadian teams in the West Coast League did not play the 2021 season due to pandemic-related border and gathering limitations. They planned to resume play in 2022, which would be the inaugural season for Springfield, Nanaimo, and Edmonton.

Corvallis went on to win its fifth consecutive and eighth overall title.

2022

In 2022, Corvallis won its sixth consecutive and ninth overall title.

On September 19, 2022, the West Coast League announced a partnership with Major League Baseball as a part of the growing list of larger collegiate leagues partnering with MLB to further grow collegiate summer wood bat baseball. The agreement was reached to jointly pursue initiatives of mutual interest, including player and coach development, technology innovation related to scouting and fan experience, and community engagement.

2023

In 2023, Corvallis defeated the Victoria HarbourCats to win its seventh consecutive and tenth overall title.

2024

On January 19, 2024, the West Coast League announced it had awarded an expansion franchise to Salem, Oregon. The new Salem team will start play in 2025 as the league's 17th team. The team would later be known as the Marion Berries.

The Portland Pickles defeated the Corvallis Knights, 4–1, on August 14, 2024, in the WCL South Division Championship, ending the Knights' 7-year title run. On August 16, the Pickles defeated the Wenatchee AppleSox, 6–5, in the WCL Championship Game with a walk-off run in the bottom of the 9th inning. This marked the first WCL title for the Portland Pickles in team history, and the first team other than Corvallis to win it all since the Bend Elks in 2015. The Pickles were the 6th unique team to take home the trophy.

2025 The Bellingham Bells defeated the Portland Pickles 2-1 to win their second West Coast League title and first since 2014.

This was the final season for the Cowlitz Black Bears who folded after not being able to secure a new field following their lease on Lower Columbia College's field expiring.

2026 The Wenatchee AppleSox defeated the Corvallis Knights 8-7 to win their sixth West Coast League championship and first since 2012.

== Records by season ==
=== Individual batting records ===
Record	Number	Person(s), team, year
Games	54	Cole Norton, Kitsap BlueJackets, 2011 Mitchell Gunsolus, Wenatchee AppleSox, 2012 Michael Lucarelli, Corvallis Knights, 2014 Grant Melker, Corvallis Knights, 2014 Mitch Skaggs, Yakima Valley Pippins, 2015 Evan Johnson, Wenatchee AppleSox, 2017 Chandler Anderson, Corvallis Knights, 2018 Gio Diaz, Portland Pickles, 2018 Andy Atwood, Corvallis Knights, 2019 Joichiro Oyama, Wenatchee AppleSox, 2022 Armando Briseño, Portland Pickles, 2023 Sam Stem, Corvallis Knights, 2023 Nate Kirkpatrick, Bellingham Bells, 2024 Jacob Mejia, Bellingham Bells, 2024 Josh Schleichardt, Portland Pickles, 2025
Batting avg. (min 2.7 Plate Appearances per team game)	.421	Travis Bazzana, Corvallis Knights, 2021
At Bats	224	Joichiro Oyama, Wenatchee AppleSox, 2022
Hits	82	Jake Holcroft, Corvallis Knights, 2019
Runs	64	Joichiro Oyama, Wenatchee AppleSox, 2022
Total Bases	130	Josh Schleichardt, Portland Pickles, 2025
Extra-Base Hits	33	Keston Hiura, Wenatchee AppleSox, 2015
Doubles	25	Tyler Davis, Bend Elks, 2015
Triples	7	Andy Atwood, Corvallis Knights, 2019
Home Runs	18	Josh Schleichardt, Portland Pickles, 2025
RBI	64	Josh Schleichardt, Portland Pickles, 2025
Sacrifice Bunts	19	Yuto Kata, Medford Rogues, 2014
Hit by Pitch	22	Eric Angerer, Bellingham Bells, 2013
Base on Balls	48	Tanner Griffith, Portland Pickles, 2024
Strikeouts	62	Alec de Watteville, Gresham GreyWolves, 2017
Stolen Bases	42	Joichiro Oyama, 2022, Wenatchee AppleSox
Caught Stealing	14	Zach Kim, Moses Lake Pirates, 2007
Slugging Percentage	0.709	Taylor Sparks, Wenatchee AppleSox, 2012
On-Base Percentage	0.515	Geoff Wagner, Bend Elks, 2005
Hitting streak (games)	26	Steven Packard, Klamath Falls Gems, 2014
Plate Appearances	276	Joichiro Oyama, Wenatchee AppleSox, 2022
Runs Created	54.678	Josh Schleichardt, Portland Pickles, 2025

=== Team batting records ===
Record	Number	Team, year
Highest batting average	0.306	Bend Elks, 2015
Lowest batting average	0.198	Kamloops NorthPaws, 2023
At bats	1986	Victoria HarbourCats, 2019
Hits	581	Victoria HarbourCats, 2019
Runs	416	Victoria HarbourCats, 2019
Total Bases	877	Victoria HarbourCats, 2019
Doubles	117	Bend Elks, 2015
Triples	19	Wenatchee AppleSox, 2016
Home runs	57	Port Angles Lefties, 2018
RBIs	339	Victoria HarbourCats, 2019
Sacrifice hits	77	Aloha Knights, 2006
Sacrifice flies	39	Corvallis Knights, 2014
Hit by pitch	74	Bend Elks, 2017
Base on balls	297	Victoria HarbourCats, 2019
Strikeouts	531	Port Angles Lefties, 2018
Stolen bases	149	Victoria HarbourCats, 2022
Caught stealing	56	Walla Walla Sweets, 2016
Slugging percentage	0.442	Victoria HarbourCats, 2019
On-base percentage	0.391	Victoria HarbourCats, 2019
GIDP	66	Wenatchee AppleSox, 2014

=== Individual pitching records ===
Record	Number	Person(s), team, year
Wins	8	Eli Morgan, Yakima Valley Pippins, 2014 Jackson Lockwood, Corvallis Knights, 2014 Zach Draper, Yakima Valley Pippins, 2016
Losses	9	Jordan Moore, Spokane RiverHawks, 2005
ERA (min. .8IP/game)	0.60	Paul Applebee, Bellingham Bells, 2007
Winning percentage	1.000	8–0, Zach Draper, Yakima Valley Pippins, 2016 8–0, Eli Morgan, Yakima Valley Pippins, 2014 7–0, Josh Mitchell, Victoria HarbourCats, 2016 6–0, Seth Martinez, Bellingham Bells, 2014
Games	28	David Bigelow, Bellingham Bells, 2014
Games Started	12	Nick Sabo, Klamath Falls Gems, 2013 Zach Draper, Yakima Valley Pippins, 2016
Complete Games	6	Jordan Moore, Spokane RiverHawks, 2005
Saves	13	Tyler Kane, Wenatchee AppleSox, 2012 Sean Luke-Brija, Walla Walla Sweets, 2013 David Bigelow, Bellingham Bells, 2014 Lars Rider, Cowlitz Black Bears, 2015 Sam Hellinger, Bellingham Bells, 2016
Innings Pitched	81 1/3	Brandon Marris, Kelowna Falcons, 2011
At Bats Against	258	Trey Witt, Kitsap BlueJackets, 2009
Fewest Runs Allowed (min. 35 IP)	4	Adam Gunn, Bellingham Bells, 2012
Fewest Earned Runs Allowed (min. 35 IP)	3	Adam Gunn, Bellingham Bells, 2012
Batting Average Against	0.139	Freddy Rodriguez, Portland Pickles, 2024
Home Runs Allowed	11	Michael Hirko, Klamath Falls Gems, 2014
Hit Batsmen	15	Kevin Waldron, Bend Elks, 2006 Steven Singer, Kitsap BlueJackets, 2009
Walks Allowed	56	Michael Silva, Klamath Falls Gems, 2014
Strikeouts	86	D.J. Lidyard, Wenatchee AppleSox, 2006
Wild pitches	18	James Brooks, Kelowna Falcons, 2017
Balks	4	Paul Jenkins, Bellingham Bells, 2007 Todd Poggemeyer, Bellingham Bells, 2008 Ari Ronick, Wenatchee AppleSox, 2005 J.T. Heaton, Kitsap BlueJacks, 2005

=== Team pitching records ===
Record	Number	Team, year
Wins	43	Portland Pickles, 2025
Losses	42	Bend Elks, 2018
Win–loss percentage	0.806	Wenatchee AppleSox, 2005
Lowest ERA	2.22	Corvallis Knights, 2009
Highest ERA	7.08	Klamath Falls Gems, 2014
Complete games	13	Spokane RiverHawks, 2005
Shutouts	9	Corvallis Knights, 2009
Saves	20	Bellingham Bells, 2014
Innings pitched	501	Victoria HarbourCats, 2019
Most hits allowed	598	Klamath Falls Gems, 2014
Fewest Hits Allowed	228	Aloha Knights, 2005
At bats against	2,258	Kelowna Falcons, 2017
Most runs allowed	457	Klamath Falls Gems, 2014
Fewest earned runs allowed	78	Aloha Knights, 2005
Most earned runs allowed	381	Klamath Falls Gems, 2014
Opposition batting average	0.197	Portland Pickles, 2018
Most home runs allowed	52	Greshman GreyWolves, 2017
Fewest home runs allowed	2	Spokane RiverHawks, 2005
Sacrifice hits allowed	62	Kelowna Falcons, 2006
Sacrifice flies allowed	22	Klamath Falls Gems, 2011 Kitsap BlueJackets, 2012
Most hit batsmen	77	Kitsap Bluejackets, 2014
Fewest Hit Batsmen	21	Corvallis Knights, 2007
Most bases on balls	311	Klamath Falls Gems, 2014
Fewest bases on balls	110	Kitsap BlueJackets, 2005
Strikeouts	539	Portland Pickles, 2018
Wild pitches	107	Bend Elks, 2019
Balks	15	Walla Walla Sweets, 2012

=== Team fielding records ===
Record	Number	Team, year
Percentage	0.978	Cowlitz Black Bears, 2017
Total chances	2,238	Bend Elks, 2011
Putouts	1,465	Corvallis Knights, 2011
Assists	676	Kitsap BlueJackets, 2012
Most errors	116	Cowlitz Black Bears, 2015
Fewest errors	43	Corvallis Knights, 2007 and 2008
Double plays	66	Bend Elks, 2011
Passed balls	27	Kitsap BlueJackets, 2012

=== Team attendance records ===
Record	Number	Team, year
Single-game record	9,200	Edmonton Riverhawks, July 1, 2024/2025/2026
Season home	131,966	Edmonton Riverhawks, 2025
Home average	4,888	Edmonton Riverhawks, 2025

== Champions ==
Year	Champion	Runner-up	Record
2026	Wenatchee AppleSox	Corvallis Knights	1–0
2025	Bellingham Bells	Portland Pickles	1–0
2024	Portland Pickles	Wenatchee AppleSox	1–0
2023	Corvallis Knights	Victoria HarbourCats	1–0
2022	Corvallis Knights	Bellingham Bells	1–0
2021	Corvallis Knights	Yakima Valley Pippins	2–1
2020	Season cancelled due to COVID-19 pandemic		
2019	Corvallis Knights	Victoria HarbourCats	2–1
2018	Corvallis Knights	Kelowna Falcons	2–0
2017	Corvallis Knights	Victoria HarbourCats	2–1
2016	Corvallis Knights	Bellingham Bells	2–1
2015	Bend Elks	Kelowna Falcons	2–0
2014	Bellingham Bells	Corvallis Knights	2–1
2013	Corvallis Knights	Wenatchee AppleSox	2–0
2012	Wenatchee AppleSox	Corvallis Knights	2–1
2011	Corvallis Knights	Walla Walla Sweets	2–0
2010	Wenatchee AppleSox	Bend Elks	2–1
2009	Wenatchee AppleSox	Corvallis Knights	2–0
2008	Corvallis Knights	Wenatchee AppleSox	2–0
2007	Moses Lake Pirates	Corvallis Knights	2–0
2006	Wenatchee AppleSox	Spokane RiverHawks	2–0
2005	Wenatchee AppleSox	Bellingham Bells	2–0

== Awards ==
=== Most Valuable Player ===
Year	Name	Team
2025	Josh Schleichardt	Portland Pickles
2024	Hunter Katschke	Ridgefield Raptors
2023	Jace Phelan	Yakima Valley Pippins
2022	Joichiro Oyama	Wenatchee AppleSox
2021	Travis Bazzana	Corvallis Knights
2019	Briley Knight	Corvallis Knights
2018	Trent Tinglestad	Kelowna Falcons
2017	Chase Illig	Bellingham Bells
2016	Michael Toglia	Wenatchee AppleSox
2015	Hunter Villanueva	Kelowna Falcons
2014	Vince Fernandez	Yakima Valley Pippins
2013	Alex Calbick	Bellingham Bells
2012	Mitchell Gunsolus	Wenatchee AppleSox
2011	Alex Stanford	Walla Walla Sweets
2010	Tommy Richards	Bend Elks
2009	Richie Jimenez	Corvallis Knights
2008	Drew Heid	Bend Elks
2007	Zach Kim; Brandon Kuykendall	Moses Lake Pirates; Kitsap BlueJackets
2006	Darin Holcomb	Spokane RiverHawks
2005	Steve Marquardt	Wenatchee AppleSox

=== Pitcher of the Year ===
Year	Pitcher	Team
2025	Gio de Graauw	Kelowna Falcons
2024	Freddy Rodriguez	Portland Pickles
2023	Halen Knoll	Edmonton Riverhawks
2022	Trevin Hope	Bellingham Bells
2021	Eric Chavarria	Bellingham Bells
2019	Tevita Gerber	Corvallis Knights
2018	Landen Bourassa, Curtis Bafus	Corvallis Knights, Wenatchee AppleSox
2017	Jack Owen	Victoria HarbourCats
2016	Zach Draper	Yakima Valley Pippins
2015	Brady Miller	Kelowna Falcons
2014	Seth Martinez	Bellingham Bells
2013	Nick Sabo	Klamath Falls Gems
2012	Cord Cockrell	Kelowna Falcons
2011	Owen Jones	Wenatchee AppleSox
2010	Dayne Quist	Kelowna Falcons
2009	Matt Andriese	Corvallis Knights
2008	Jared Eskew	Corvallis Knights
2007	Paul Applebee	Bellingham Bells
2006	Ross Humes	Kitsap Bluejackets
2005	Tommy Hanson	Aloha Knights

=== Coach of the Year ===
Year	Coach	Team
2024	Ed Knaggs	Bellingham Bells
2024	Mitch Darlington; Mark Magadaleno	Wenatchee AppleSox; Portland Pickles
2023	Todd Haney	Victoria Harbourcats
2022	Brooke Knight	Corvallis Knights
2021	Brooke Knight	Corvallis Knights
2019	Brooke Knight	Corvallis Knights
2018	Bryan Donohue, Justin Barchus	Kelowna Falcons, Portland Pickles
2017	Brooke Knight	Corvallis Knights
2016	Graig Merritt	Victoria HarbourCats
2015	Billy Clontz	Kelowna Falcons
2014	Jeff James	Bellingham Bells
2013	Brooke Knight	Corvallis Knights
2012	Ed Knaggs	Wenatchee AppleSox
2011	Brooke Knight	Corvallis Knights
2010	Ed Knaggs	Wentchee AppleSox
2009	Ed Knaggs, Brooke Knight	Wenatchee AppleSox, Corvallis Knights
2008	Brooke Knight	Corvallis Knights
2007	Gabe Boruff	Moses Lake Pirates
2006	Steve Hertz	Spokane RiverHawks
2005	Ed Knaggs	Wenatchee AppleSox

=== Executive of the Year ===
Year	Coach	Team
2025	Luke Emanuel	Marion Berries
2024	Stephanie Morrell	Bellingham Bells
2023	Gus Farah	Cowlitz Black Bears, Ridgefield Raptors
2022	Dan Segel	Corvallis Knights
2021	Stephanie Morrell	Bellingham Bells
2019	Alan Miller	Portland Pickles
2018	Glenn Kirkpatrick	Bellingham Bells
2017	Tony Bonacci	Cowlitz Black Bears
2016	Jim Swanson	Victoria HarbourCats
2015	Mark Nonis, Casey Powell	Kelowna Falcons, Bend Elks
2014	Nick Caples	Bellingham Bells
2013	Holly Jones	Victoria HarbourCats
2012	Nick Caples	Bellingham Bells
2011	Eddie Poplawski	Bellingham Bells
2010	Zachary Fraser	Walla Walla Sweets
2009	Dan Segel	Corvallis Knights
2008	Dan Segel	Corvallis Knights
2007	Dan Segel	Corvallis Knights
2006	Brent & Amy Kirwan	Moses Lake Pirates
2005	Rick Smith & partners	Kitsap Bluejackets

=== Jim Dietz Sportsmanship Award ===
Year	Team
2025	Marion Berries
2024	Ridgefield Raptors
2023	Springfield Drifters
2022	Corvallis Knights
2021	Bellingham Bells
2019	Ridgefield Raptors
2018	Bellingham Bells
2017	Bellingham Bells
2016	Corvallis Knights & Wenatchee AppleSox
2015	Klamath Falls Gems
2014	Bellingham Bells
2013	Bellingham Bells
2012	Cowlitz Black Bears
2011	Cowlitz Black Bears
2010	Moses Lake Pirates
2009	Moses Lake Pirates
2008	Corvallis Knights

- Established in 2008, and named after the West Coast League's inaugural commissioner Jim Dietz.

== Pennant winners ==
Year	Team	Record
2005	Wenatchee AppleSox	29–7
2006	Spokane RiverHawks	28–14

Before 2007 there was only 1 division.

Year	East	Record	West	Record
2007	Moses Lake Pirates	29–13	Corvallis Knights	27–15
2008	Wenatchee Applesox	23–19	Corvallis Knights	31–11
2009	Wenatchee Applesox	34–14	Corvallis Knights	38–10
2010	Wenatchee Applesox	29–19	Corvallis Knights	31–17
2011	Wenatchee Applesox	39–15	Corvallis Knights	37–17
2012	Wenatchee Applesox	37–17	Corvallis Knights	32–22

In 2013 the league moved from an East/West format to a North/South Division format.

Year	North	Record	South	Record
2013	Walla Walla Sweets	31–22	Corvallis Knights	37–17

In 2014 the League moved to a 3-division format.

Year	East	Record	West	Record	South	Record
2014	Yakima Valley Pippins	35–19	Bellingham Bells	37–17	Corvallis Knights	35–19
2015	Kelowna Falcons	34–19	Bellingham Bells	33–21	Bend Elks	35–16

In 2016 the League went to a 2 division split-season style format.

Year	Pennant Won	Team	Record
2016	North Division First Half	Victoria HarbourCats	23–4
2016	North Division Second Half	Victoria HarbourCats, Bellingham Bells	17–10
2016	North Division Overall	Victoria HarbourCats	40–14
2016	South Division First Half	Corvallis Knights	18–9
2016	South Division Second Half	Yakima Valley Pippins	17–10
2016	South Division Overall	Corvallis Knights	34–20
2017	North Division First Half	Kelowna Falcons	17–10
2017	North Division Second Half	Bellingham Bells, Victoria HarbourCats	15–12
2017	North Division Overall	Bellingham Bells	31–23
2017	South Division First Half	Corvallis Knights	17–10
2017	South Division Second Half	Corvallis Knights	17–10
2017	South Division Overall	Corvallis Knights	34–20
2018	North Division First Half	Bellingham Bells	18–8
2018	North Division Second Half	Bellingham Bells	17–11
2018	North Division Overall	Bellingham Bells	35–19
2018	South Division First Half	Portland Pickles	17–9
2018	South Division Second Half	Corvallis Knights	20–7
2018	South Division Overall	Portland Pickles	37–17
2019	North Division First Half	Victoria HarbourCats	18–9
2019	North Division Second Half	Victoria HarbourCats	21–6
2019	North Division Overall	Victoria HarbourCats	39–15
2019	South Division First Half	Corvallis Knights	21–6
2019	South Division Second Half	Corvallis Knights	21–6
2019	South Division Overall	Corvallis Knights	42–12
2021	North Division First Half	Yakima Valley Pippins	15–9
2021	North Division Second Half	Yakima Valley Pippins	14–10
2021	North Division Overall	Yakima Valley Pippins	29–19
2021	South Division First Half	Corvallis Knights	18–6
2021	South Division Second Half	Corvallis Knights	19–5
2021	South Division Overall	Corvallis Knights	37–11
2022	North Division First Half	Bellingham Bells	19–7
2022	North Division Second Half	Wenatchee Applesox	15–12
2022	North Division Overall	Bellingham Bells	33–20
2022	South Division First Half	Corvallis Knights	18–8
2022	South Division Second Half	Corvallis Knights	21–7
2022	South Division Overall	Corvallis Knights	38–15
2023	North Division First Half	Bellingham Bells	20–7
2023	North Division Second Half	Victoria HarbourCats	19–7
2023	North Division Overall	Victoria HarbourCats	38–15
2023	South Division First Half	Ridgefield Raptors	18–8
2023	South Division Second Half	Corvallis Knights	22–5
2023	South Division Overall	Corvallis Knights	39–15
2024	North Division First Half	Edmonton Riverhawks	18–9
2024	North Division Second Half	Wenatchee AppleSox	17–10
2024	North Division Overall	Wenatchee AppleSox	35–19
2024	South Division First Half	Corvallis Knights	22–5
2024	South Division Second Half	Portland Pickles	23–6
2024	South Division Overall	Corvallis Knights	41–13
