= Bellingham Gillnetters =

- 1905; Bellingham, Washington

Minor league affiliations
- Class: Class B (1905)
- League: Northwestern League (1905)

Major league affiliations
- Team: None

Minor league titles
- League titles (0): None

Team data
- Name: Bellingham Gillnetters (1905)
- Ballpark: Fairgrounds Park (1905)

The Bellingham Gillnetters were a minor league baseball team based in Bellingham, Washington. In 1905, the Gillnetters played as members of the Class B level Northwestern League, finishing in second place in their only season of play. The 1905 Bellingham home games were played at Fairgrounds Park. The Gillnetters were succeeded by the 1938 Bellingham Chinooks, who began play as members of the Western International League.

== History ==
In 1905, the Bellingham "Gillnetters" were the first minor league baseball team in Bellingham, becoming charter members of the four–team Class B level Northwestern League. The Everett Smokestackers, Vancouver Horse Doctors and Victoria Legislators teams joined the Gillnetters in beginning league play on May 9, 1905.

The Bellingham "Gillnetters" nickname corresponds to the city's shoreline location, and the subsequent local boating and fishing industry. A gillnetter is generally a smaller vessel operated by one man. A gillnet is the net used to snare a target size fish in its mesh.

On the home opening day in 1905, a crowd of 3,500 was in attendance at Fairgrounds Park.

The Gillnetters had a fan group nicknamed the "Cowbell Gang." The group had ten members, who each held a cowbell with a letter on it, spelling out "BELLINGHAM." The group rang their cowbells during the games.

In their one season of play, the Gillnetters finished in second place in the Northwestern League standings. With a 49–48 record, playing the season under managers Kirby Drennen and Dad Clarke, Bellingham finished 11.0 games behind the first place Everett Smokestackers (60–37). Bellingham and Everett finished ahead of the third place Vancouver Horse Doctors (45–52) and last place Victoria Legislators/Spokane Indians (41–58) in the final Northwestern League standings.

The Bellingham franchise folded from the Northwestern League after the 1905 season and did not play in the 1906 league. The 1905 team is also referred to as the Bellingham "Yankees".

In 1938, the Bellingham Chinooks succeeded the Gillnetters in minor league play. The Chinooks became members of the six–team Class B level Western International League and captured the league championship.

== The ballpark ==
The 1905 Bellingham Gillnetters played home games at Fairgrounds Park. Hosting other events as well as baseball, the grandstands were opened in 1899. The ballpark was located north of Iowa Street. Today, the site is industrial property.

Later, the Bellingham Chinooks played 1938 and 1939 minor league home games at Battersby Park.

== Year–by–year record ==
Year	Record	Finish	Manager	Playoffs/Notes
1905	49–48	2nd	Kirby Drennen / Dad Clarke	No playoffs held

== Notable alumni ==
- Bill Brinker (1905)
- George Bristow (1905)
- Dad Clarke (1905, MGR)
- Carl Druhot (1905)
- Billy Kelsey (1905)

=== See also ===
Bellingham Gillnetters players
