= Bellingham Chinooks =

- 1938–1939; Bellingham, Washington

Minor league affiliations
- Class: Class B (1938–1939)
- League: Western International League (1938–1939)

Major league affiliations
- Team: None

Minor league titles
- League titles (1): 1938
- Wild card berths (1): 1938

Team data
- Name: Bellingham Chinooks (1938–1939)
- Ballpark: Battersby Park (1938–1939)

The Bellingham Chinooks were a minor league baseball team based in Bellingham, Washington. In 1938 and 1939, the Chinooks played as members of the Class B level Western International League, winning the 1938 league championship and hosting home games at Battersby Park. The Bellingham Chinooks were succeeded in Bellingham by the 1973 Bellingham Dodgers, who began play as members of the Northwest League.

== History ==
In 1905, the Bellingham Gillnetters were the first minor league baseball team in Bellingham, Washington, playing the season as members of the four–team Class B level Northwestern League before folding.

Minor league baseball resumed in Bellingham in 1938 with a championship season. The Bellingham Chinooks became members of the six–team Class B level Western International League and captured the league championship under manager Ken Penner. With a 68–65 regular season record, the Chinooks placed second in the regular season standings, finishing 9.5 games behind the first place Yakima Pippins. In the 1938 playoffs, the Bellingham Chinooks defeated the Vancouver Maple Leafs three games to one and advanced. In the Final, Bellingham defeated the Yakima Pippins four games to three to become league champions.

After winning the championship in 1938, the 1939 Bellingham Chinooks finished in last place in the Western International League standings. The franchise subsequently folded after the season. With a 40–102 regular season record, the Chinooks placed sixth in the six-team standings, playing the season under managers Ken Penner, Jimmie Reese and Al Lightner. Bellingham finished behind the Wenatchee Chiefs (86–57), Tacoma Tigers (78–63), Vancouver Capilanos (76–63), Spokane Indians (75–69) and Yakima Pippins (72–73) in the final standings.

After the 1938 season, the Bellingham franchise was replaced in 1940 Western League play by the Salem Senators.

Bellingham was without minor league baseball until 1973, when the Bellingham Dodgers began play as members of the Class A level Northwest League.

== The ballpark ==
The Bellingham Chinooks hosted home minor league games at Battersby Park. Battersby Park had a capacity of 3,000 and dimensions of (Left, Center, Right): 290–350–435. The ballpark was torn down in 1968. Today, Battersby Park is still in use as a public Park.

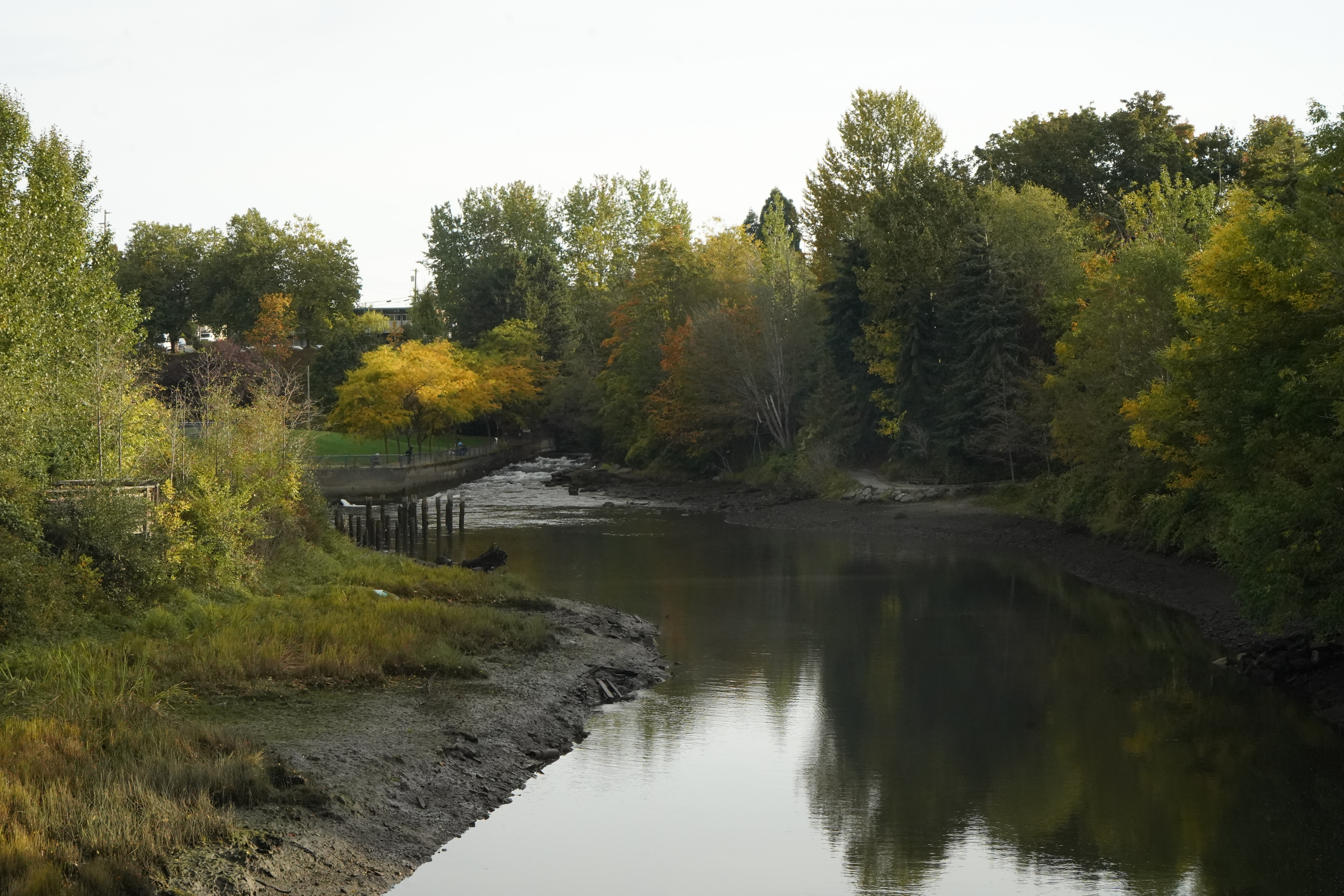
(2018) Whatcom Creek And Maritime Heritage Park. Bellingham, Washington

== Timeline ==
Year(s)	# Yrs.	Team	Level	League	Ballpark
1938–1939	2	Bellingham Chinooks	Class B	Western International League	Battersby Park

== Year–by–year records ==
Year	Record	Finish	Manager	Playoffs/Notes
1938	68–65	2nd	Ken Penner	League champions
1939	40–102	6th	Ken Penner; Jimmie Reese / Al Lightner	Did not qualify

== Notable alumni ==
- Rugger Ardizoia (1938)
- Cliff Dapper (1938)
- Bill Fleming (1938)
- Billy Kelsey (1905)
- Dave Odom (1938)
- Ken Penner (1938–1939, MGR)
- Jimmie Reese (1939, MGR) Los Angeles Angels Hall of Fame
- Bill Rigney (1939) MLB All-Star
- Wes Schulmerich (1938)
- Bud Stewart (1939)
- Jim Tyack (1938)

=== See also ===
Bellingham Chinooks players
