= Bremerton Bluejackets =

- 1946–1949; Bremerton, Washington

Minor league affiliations
- Class: Class B (1946–1949)
- League: Western International League (1946–1949)

Major league affiliations
- Team: None

Minor league titles
- League titles (0): None

Team data
- Name: Bremerton Bluejackets (1946–1949)
- Ballpark: Roosevelt Field (1946–1949)

The Bremerton Bluejackets were a minor league baseball team based in Bremerton, Washington. From 1946 to 1949, the "Bluejackets" played as members of the Class B level Western International League.

The Bremerton Bluejackets teams hosted home minor league games at Roosevelt Field, which was torn down in 1992. In 1946, the Spokane Indians team was involved in a tragic accident while traveling to play a game in Bremerton at Roosevelt Field.

== History ==
In 1946, the Bluejackets were the first minor league baseball team in Bremerton, Washington, playing the season as members of the eight-team Class B level Northwestern League, as the league resumed play following World War II. The Salem Senators, Spokane Indians, Tacoma Tigers, Vancouver Capilanos, Victoria Athletics, Wenatchee Chiefs and Yakima Stars teams joined Bremerton in beginning league play on April 26, 1946.

In their first season of play, the Bremerton Bluejackets placed third in Western International League standings, as the league held no playoffs. The Bluejackets ended the 1946 season with a record of 73–63, as Sam Gibson served as manager. Bremerton finished 12.0 games behind the first place Wenatchee Chiefs in the final standings. Warren Barisoff of Bremerton led the league with both 40 home runs and 155 RBI, while Bremerton pitcher Clarence Federmeyer led the league with 21 wins.

On June 24, 1946, the Spokane Indians team was involved in a tragic accident en route to play at Bremerton. The Spokane team bus was traveling west toward Bremerton, Washington. While the bus was crossing the Cascade Mountains on the wet Snoqualmie Pass Highway (then U.S. Route 10), the bus driver swerved to avoid an oncoming car. The Indians' bus veered off the road, down an embankment, crashing and catching fire.

Nine people were killed in the accident. Six were killed instantly, three died later and seven were injured. The dead were catcher/manager Mel Cole (age 32), players Bob Kinnaman (28), George Lyden (23), Chris Hartje (31), Fred Martinez (24), Vic Picetti (18), George Risk (25), Bob James (25) and Bob Paterson (23). With a severe head wound, player Ben Geraghty was able to navigate the mountainside to reach the road and signal for help. The injured survivors included players Pete Barisoff, Gus Hallbourg, Dick Powers, Irv Konopka, Levi McCormack, and the bus driver Glen Berg.

Continuing play in 1947, The Bremerton Bluejackets ended the Western International League season with a record of 86–68, placing third in the final standings. Alan Strange served as manager, his first of three seasons leading the club. The Bluejackets finished just 1.0 game behind the first place Vancouver Capilanos in the standings. Pitcher Joe Sullivan of the Bluejackets led the league with a 2.68 ERA.

The Bremerton Bluejackets placed second in the 1948 eight-team Western International League. Bremerton ended the 1948 season with a record of 95–62. Alan Strange returned as manager, as Bremerton finished the season 2½ games behind the first place Spokane Indians in the final standings. Bremerton pitcher Lloyd Hittle led the league with both a 2.29 ERA and 201 strikeouts.

In 1948, Hub Kittle was completing his third season pitching for Bremerton, while also serving as a coach. The Western International League then ruled that players could not serve as coaches on league teams. Instead of taking the resulting $50.00 pay cut, Kittle returned to running his restaurant "Hub Kittle's Chili Parlor" in Yakima, Washington. Once there, the Yakima club owners, who frequented his restaurant, arranged for a trade from Bremerton.

In their final season of play, Bremerton finished in last place in the Western International League standings. The Bremerton Bluejackets of the ended the 1949 season with a record of 60-89 losses, placing eighth in the final standings. Alan Strange served as manager, as the Bluejackets finished 38½ games behind the first place Yakima Bears. John Marshall led the league with 22 wins.

The Bluejackets did not return to play in the 1950 Western International league. The 1950 Tri-City Braves franchise replaced Bremerton in league play. Bremerton has not hosted another minor league team.

== The ballpark ==
The Bremerton Bluejackets hosted home minor league games at Roosevelt Field. The 4,500 seat ballpark was located at Warren Avenue & 16th Street. The ballpark was demolished in 1992, after the property was sold to Olympic College. Today, the ballpark site is a parking lot.

== Timeline ==
Year(s)	# Yrs.	Team	Level	League	Ballpark
1946–1949	4	Bremerton Bluejackets	Class B	Western International League	Roosevelt Field

== Year–by–year records ==
Year	Record	Finish	Manager	Playoffs/Notes
1946	73–63	3rd	Sam Gibson	No playoffs held.
1947	86–68	3rd	Alan Strange	No playoffs held.
1948	95–62	2nd	Alan Strange	No playoffs held
1949	60–89	8th	Alan Strange	No playoffs held

== Notable alumni ==
- Sam Gibson (1946, MGR)
- Lloyd Hittle (1948)
- Hub Kittle (1946–1948)
- John Leovich (1946)
- Ed Samcoff (1948)
- Alan Strange (1947–1949, MGR)
- Joe Sullivan (1946–1949)
- Billy Taylor (1948)
- Al Wright (1946)

== See also ==
- Bremerton Bluejackets players
