= Doraine and Ellis =

- Origin: Cleveland, Ohio, United States
- Genres: Musical theatre, operetta
- Years active: 1930s–1990s
- Label: Onstage Records

Program cover for one of Doraine and Ellis's many musical shows.

Doraine and Ellis (Doraine Renard: 1913–2003 and Ellis Lucas: 1916–2006) were an American husband and wife vaudeville and variety singing team of the twentieth century, who often billed themselves as "The Singing Sweethearts" or "America's Foremost Singing Team".

Touring with the USO for hundreds of performances during World War II at the behest of Bob Hope, whom the couple knew from their days of performing at nightclubs around the United States, Doraine and Ellis entertained Allied troops on bills with such performers as Morey Amsterdam and Martha Raye before being forced to return stateside following minor injuries received in London during the Blitz.

== USO years ==
Following a show at the Atlanta Biltmore Hotel, where the duo was playing an extended engagement shortly after the outbreak of World War II, General James Mollison, who was in the audience, asked the couple to perform for his troops. Shuttling from Atlanta to Mobile, Alabama for Sunday shows on their days off, Doraine and Ellis gave several performances for Mollison's troops who were stationed there. Bob Hope then requested that they sign up to go overseas with their show and had a tour of U.S. military installations arranged for them by the Hollywood Victory Committee. Their initial tour was to include only installations in the southwest U.S.; however, while playing an engagement in Indio, California, the couple received instructions to leave for New York the following day for a show at the Brooklyn Navy Yard. From there, they were sent to Miami for a show but were quickly diverted to play for British troops in the Bahamas and Bermuda.

By 1944, Doraine and Ellis's overseas work in World War II had taken them on a 13-month tour of fighting fronts in 23 countries, placing them in the ranks of the most seasoned veterans of U.S.O. camp shows. The couple's U.S.O. shows took them to Iceland, England, and British, French, and Dutch Guiana in addition to many tropical island locations that they were prevented from disclosing to others at the time for security reasons. "A lot of times we were flown to a ship or an island and never did know just where we were," Ellis said in a contemporary newspaper article about their work.

Troops that Doraine and Ellis entertained on their overseas tour appreciated most the couple's offerings of semiclassical and light operatic fare, requesting their versions of "Ah, Sweet Mystery of Life", "Indian Love Call", and Jerome Kern's "Make Believe". According to Doraine, the troops wanted to hear their versions of "sentimental songs that reminded them of their girls back home."

In a 2004 interview Ellis commented that the soldiers always appreciated the effort to distract them from their deadly duties. "They needed to be entertained to relieve the pressures they were under on the battlefield. They were just so enthusiastic."

The need for military secrecy played out in other ways during the couple's tour. In late 1944, they reported that the show that most stood out in their memory to that date was one that had taken place at a bomber base in England in June 1944, when the colonel in charge had to cancel a post-performance visit to the officers' club, citing pending "important business" the next morning and the need for "a few hours sleep". The next morning they learned that the colonel's "important business" was D-Day.

Doraine and Ellis often joked that "bugs rather than bombs" were their chief disturbance on tour. "At one jungle training camp in a malarial control zone, we were supposed to give an afternoon show, but travel was so bad that we didn't arrive until after sundown. You're not supposed to go around at night without net covering but Doraine stood in the spotlight in a flimsy gown, bare neck and shoulders, singing to soldiers all covered with mosquito netting." Danger from bombings was a reality though: during their stay in England, the couple were knocked out by a robot bomb and narrowly escaped injury from another. Doraine was hit by falling plaster in a War Department building. While playing the London Palladium, an air raid alert sounded. Both expected a rush for shelters but were amazed that the rest of the show went on. Seeing the courage of their fellow performers and of the audience, they continued with their own performance.

Eventually, the couple were forced to return to America after being among those injured from the first successful German V-1 rocket to hit England in June 1944.

== Post-War and later career ==
In the immediate post-war years of the 1940s Doraine and Ellis held the house record at many venues, including the Empire Room at Chicago's Palmer House, returning annually for many seasons. The couple appeared on early television shows such as The Morey Amsterdam Show.

In later years, they toured the country extensively in their Costumed Calvacade of Broadway's Greatest Musical Hits, a revue in which they presented musical selections from Show Boat, Annie Get Your Gun, South Pacific, Oklahoma!, My Fair Lady, The Music Man and so on and became successful producers in their own right through their production company, Harmony House Attractions. In the 1960s, accompanist Earl Wentz joined the team for several tours throughout the United States.

== Critical response ==
Doraine and Ellis presented an optimistic, glamorous, yet wholesome portrait of America in their act, garnering wide acclaim: "They more than live up to their title "Romance in Song"; "Sensational singing duo...glamorous costuming, as well as excellent stage presence make them one of the most delightful attractions to appear here; and "You'll fall in love with Doraine and Ellis. They radiate wholesome charm.". The show business publication, Variety raved, "Fine voices and personalities combine to produce a smooth session of well chosen, cleverly arranged songs.".

The team made appearances in 48 states and 23 countries before retiring in the 1990s. Their extensive costume collection was donated to the costume department of Central Piedmont Community College in Charlotte, NC.

== Recordings ==
- A Night on Broadway With Doraine and Ellis; Onstage Records
- Showtime USA; Onstage Records
