= Chuck Eisenmann =

American baseball player and dog trainer

- Pitcher
- Born: October 22, 1918; Hawthorne, Wisconsin, U.S.
- Died: September 6, 2010 (aged 91); Roseburg, Oregon, U.S.
- Batted: Both Threw: Right

MiLB debut
- 1940, for the Los Angeles Angels

Last MiLB appearance
- April 29, 1953, for the San Diego Padres

Teams
- Los Angeles Angels (1940); Vancouver Capilanos (1940); Yakima Pippins (1940–1941); San Diego Padres (1941–1942, 1946, 1953); Tulsa Oilers (1946, 1952); Memphis Chicks (1947–1949); Mobile Bears (1950); Ottawa Giants (1951); Syracuse Mets (1951–1952); San Francisco Seals (1953)

Charles Paul Eisenmann (October 22, 1918 – September 6, 2010) was an American professional baseball pitcher and dog trainer who played in Minor League Baseball (MiLB) from 1940 to 1942 and again from 1946 to 1953 after serving in the United States Army. He is best known for being the owner and trainer of multiple dogs, most notably London, who starred in the Canadian television series The Littlest Hobo.

== Early life and career ==
Chuck Eisenmann was born Charles Paul Eisenmann on October 22, 1918, in Hawthorne, Wisconsin, to German immigrant parents Richard and Marie (Mary). He had a total of nine siblings, including two older brothers who both served in the United States Navy. Shortly following his birth, Eisenmann's family would move around and eventually settle in Parkland. He graduated from high school in 1937 and joined the Army shortly afterwards, where he became a military baseball pitcher in the Schofield Barracks league's 8th Field Artillery Regiment team while serving in Honolulu between 1937 and 1938. Eisenmann was noticed by Detroit Tigers scouts during this period, who bought him out of the military to play professionally. He boarded the SS Lurline on November 18, 1938, sailing to California.

== Baseball and military career ==
In 1939, Eisenmann took spring training at the Tigers camp in St. Petersburg, Florida, where he injured his arm. While playing as a member of the Lake Charles club, Eisenmann was one of the 88 minor league players who Judge Kenesaw Mountain Landis declared as free agents on January 14, 1940. The following month, on February 19, 1940, he was signed on to the Los Angeles Angels roster of the Pacific Coast League. He pitched for the team until May 13, 1940, when he was transferred to the Western International League to pitch for the Vancouver Capilanos, later moving to the Yakima Pippins mid-season, where he remained the following year. In November 1941, the San Diego Padres bought Eisenmann's contract, where he remained for the beginning of the 1942 season after showing an impressing performance during spring training. Although he became of interest to the Spokane Indians, he would re-enlist in the Army on April 11, 1942. He was sent to England as second lieutenant after graduating from training school.

As a member of the 827th Signal Service Battalion unit stationed in London, Eisenmann oversaw the athletics department in the Special Services Division, where he organized military baseball teams. The most notable team organized by Eisenmann was the CBS (Central Base Section) Clowns, a successful team represented by Central Base Section members of the US Army. He coached for the United States army team for the Tea Bowl I football match against Canada, which took place in London on February 13, 1944. After he was discharged in late 1945, Eisenmann returned to professional baseball, albeit he did struggle while doing so. He rejoined the San Diego Padres to play for the 1946 season, but was later assigned to the Tulsa Oilers on June 17. On June 4, 1947, he was sold by the Padres to the Memphis Chicks. Eisenmann pitched for Memphis until being picked up by the Chicago White Sox in September 1948, but was returned to Memphis after spring training the following year before having the chance to play for them. Although the White Sox recalled him in September 1949, he was part of an exchange between the White Sox and the Brooklyn Dodgers on September 30 which saw the Dodgers' Chico Carrasquel be traded for Eisenmann, Fred Hancock, and $35,000 towards the Montreal Royals. He pitched for the Mobile Bears in 1950, and in 1951 for the Triple-A International League Ottawa Giants and later the Syracuse Mets after the New York Giants bought him, later sending him back to the Tulsa Oilers in 1952, who released him after the season. He appeared in three games in 1953 as a relief pitcher for the San Francisco Seals, who released him on April 10. He appeared in an additional five games after rejoining the San Diego Padres, who then released him on April 29, ending his professional career. He then pitched for and managed the Kearney Irishmen in the Nebraska International League. In 1956, Eisenmann attended the Bill McGowan School for Umpires, but would only umpire for a single season. In August, Eisenmann started pitching for the Bismarck Barons in the Mandak League.

== Dog training ==
In 1947, Eisenmann was a nightclub owner in Los Angeles, where he bought his first dog, who he named London, which was where he served in the Army. London was initially bought to be a watchdog but would instead be trained by Eisenmann and later start a career in acting. However, other sources that have also mentioned London's age would put his birth around 1953, with Eisenmann buying him Hollywood. Eisenmann taught London how to count, spell, and understand thousands of words. London was mostly known as being a German Shepherd, but according to The Bismarck Tribune writer Curt Eriksmoen, he was actually a Tamaskan. Eisenmann would train London to perform tricks during baseball games. During a baseball game on June 26, 1955, London gave the pitcher his jacket upon reaching base, which angered two umpires later that day. An argument ensued, during which London pushed one of the umpires. The incident led to a feature on Life magazine on July 25, 1955, which gained London popularity. London was also featured on the television show You Asked for It. He was dubbed by some as being "probably the smartest dog in Hollywood." In 1957, London was injured when a delivery truck collided with Eisenmann's vehicle.

Eisenmann and London would go on to spend time in Hollywood, where London appeared in the 1958 film The Littlest Hobo, which was received well by critics. London later appeared in the 1960 adventure film My Dog, Buddy as well as the 1961 film Just Between Us and Marks of Distinction. During development for My Dog Buddy, two of London's offspring were given away, with another one, a dog named Lance, performed a stunt for Just Between Us. London had three additional sons, Thorn, Toro and Little London "Litlon", with Thorn occasionally serving as a double actor for London. In 1961, Eisenmann filed a $35,000 lawsuit against the delivery firm who owned the truck involved in the 1957 collision. He appeared in court with London on February 27, where he alleged that London's injuries, a broken leg and a bumped head, limited his acting abilities. On March 2, the jury reached a verdict in favor of the defense.

London starred in the 1963 Canadian television series The Littlest Hobo based on his 1958 movie, but by this time Eisenmann had three more dogs, Toro, Litlon and Thorn, who also played in his spot. By April 1964, London had been the father of 286 dogs, including another one of Eisenmann's dogs who was also named London. By 1966, the original London was retired, and he died at the age of 17. David Malcolmson wrote a biography about London, titled "London: The Dog That Made the Team". In the summer of 1967, one of the London dogs were featured on The Tonight Show Starring Johnny Carson.

Toro had two sons, Hobo and London, who starred in the 1969 Romanian movie Silent Friends. By 1971, Eisenmann had another dog, Venus. London would go on to star in the 1977 comedy film The Billion Dollar Hobo. During a revival of The Littlest Hobo from 1979 to 1985, the titular Hobo was played by another one of Eisenmann's dogs, Beau.

Eisenmann wrote four books about dog training.

== Personal life and death ==
In 1946, Eisenmann lived in Superior, Wisconsin. He would later live in Kearney, Nebraska, where he spent time as a sports writer for the Kearney Hub. He moved to Roseburg, Oregon, around 1982, where he died on September 6, 2010, at the age of 91.

== Bibliography ==
- 1968: Stop! Sit! and Think: The Only 20th Century Manual for Educating All Dogs. Macdonald-Redmore.
- 1983: A Dog's Day In Court. Bryant Press. ISBN 0969151810.
