= Joe Sullivan (pitcher) =

American baseball player (1910–1985)

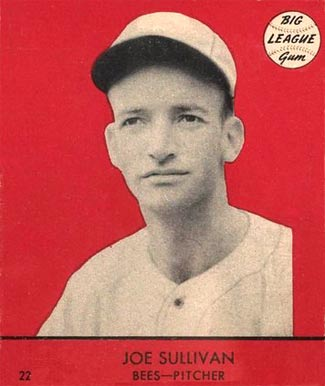
- Pitcher
- Born: September 26, 1910; Mason City, Illinois, U.S.
- Died: April 8, 1985 (aged 74); Sequim, Washington, U.S.
- Batted: Left Threw: Left

MLB debut
- April 20, 1935, for the Detroit Tigers

Last MLB appearance
- September 23, 1941, for the Pittsburgh Pirates

MLB statistics
- Win–loss record: 30–37
- Earned run average: 4.01
- Strikeouts: 216
- Stats at Baseball Reference

Teams
- Detroit Tigers (1935–1936); Boston Bees / Braves (1939–1941); Pittsburgh Pirates (1941)

Career highlights and awards
- World Series champion (1935)

Joe Sullivan (September 26, 1910 – April 8, 1985) was a left-handed American baseball pitcher.

Sullivan played professional baseball from 1931 to 1949, including five seasons in Major League Baseball with the Detroit Tigers (1935–36), Boston Bees / Braves (1939–41), and Pittsburgh Pirates (1941). In five major league seasons, he compiled a record of 30–37 with a 4.01 earned run average (ERA). A knuckleball specialist, Sullivan once pitched 12 straight scoreless innings as a relief pitcher.

== Early years ==
Sullivan was born in 1910 in Mason City, Illinois. His family moved west, initially to Twin Falls, Idaho, and then to Tracyton, Washington, where his father went to work in the shipyards. Sullivan was a three-sport athlete, playing football, baseball, and basketball, at Silverdale High School where he graduated in 1928.

After high school, Sullivan played semi-pro ball for the Bremerton Cruisers of the Northwest League. In 1929, he played for New Westminster of the Vancouver City League.

== Professional baseball ==
=== Minor leagues (1930–1934) ===
In 1930, Sullivan signed with a scout for the New York Yankees and was assigned to the Hollywood Stars of the Pacific Coast League (PCL). He was then released and played for the Tucson Missions of the Arizona State League. He compiled a 12–3 record in 1931.

In June 1931, the Beaumont Exporters of the Texas League, purchased Sullivan from Tucson for $1,500. He remained with Beaumont from the end of the 1931 season through the 1933 season.

In 1934, he returned to the Hollywood Stars and compiled a 25–11 season with a 2.88 earned run average (ERA).

=== Detroit Tigers (1935–36) ===
With his strong performance in 1934, Sullivan was promoted to the Detroit Tigers in 1935. In his first start on April 28, he pitched a complete game victory and had two RBIs against the Cleveland Indians. He followed with two more complete game victories over the Boston Red Sox on May 4 and the Washington Senators on May 10 to extend his record to 3–0.

Sullivan declined after his first three starts, ultimately appearing in 25 games for the 1935 Tigers with a 6–6 record and a 3.51 ERA. The Tigers won the American League pennant, but Sullivan did not play in the 1935 World Series.

In 1936, Sullivan appeared in 26 games, four as a starter, and compiled 2–5 record with a 6.78 ERA.

=== Minor leagues (1937–38) ===
In 1937, Sullivan returned to the minor leagues, appearing in 37 games, 29 as a starter, for the Toledo Mud Hens. He compiled a 14–14 record with a 4.66 ERA.

In 1938, he joined the Toronto Maple Leafs of the International League. He appeared in 37 games, 29 as a starter, and compiled an 18–10 record with a 3.76 ERA.

=== Boston and Pittsburgh (1939–41) ===
In 1939, Sullivan was given a second chance by the Boston Braves. In 1939, he appeared in 31 games, 11 as a starter, and compiled a 6–9 record with a 3.64 ERA in 125 2/3 innings. In 1940, he appeared in 36 games, 22 as a starter, and compiled a 10–14 record with a 3.55 ERA in 177 1/3 innings.

Sullivan began the 1941 season with the Braves but was sold to the Pittsburgh Pirates in June. During the complete season, he appeared in 32 games, six as a starter, and compiled a 6–3 record with a 3.63 ERA. In the last half of the season, he went 4–1 with a 2.97 ERA for the Pirates. Despite having his first winning record and his lowest ERA, Sullivan never played another game in the major leagues.

=== Minor leagues (1942–49) ===
Sullivan played for Toronto Maple Leafs of the International League (1942–1944), Oakland Oaks and Portland Beavers of the PCL (1944), Bremerton Bluejackets of the Western International League (1946–1949). He compiled identical 13–5 records in 1947 and 1948 with ERAs of 2.68 and 2.86.

== Family and later years ==
Sullivan married Maxyne Whitaker in 1928. They had a son, Jackie, in 1930. Maxyne died in 1968, and he was later married to his second wife, Marge.

In 1945, he began a career with the Puget Sound Naval Shipyard, where he eventually became fire chief and worked until 1970.

Sullivan died in 1985 at age 74 in Sequim, Washington, after a long battle with lung cancer.
