= Ken Penner =

American baseball player (1896–1959)

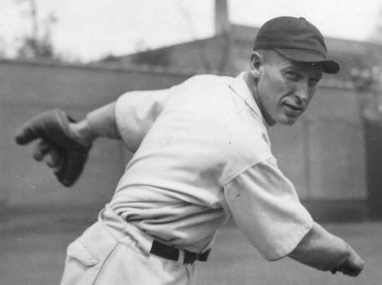
- Penner, circa 1929
- Pitcher
- Born: April 24, 1896; Boonville, Indiana, U.S.
- Died: May 28, 1959 (aged 63); Sacramento, California, U.S.
- Batted: Left Threw: Right

MLB debut
- September 11, 1916, for the Cleveland Indians

Last MLB appearance
- September 4, 1929, for the Chicago Cubs

MLB statistics
- Win–loss record: 1–2
- Earned run average: 3.55
- Strikeouts: 8
- Stats at Baseball Reference

Teams
- Cleveland Indians (1916); Chicago Cubs (1929)

Kenneth William Penner (April 24, 1896 – May 28, 1959) was an American Major League Baseball pitcher who played for two seasons. He pitched for the Cleveland Indians in 1916 and the NL-Pennant winning Chicago Cubs in 1929; he did not appear in the World Series.

In between his two major league seasons, he played in the minor leagues for 28 seasons (1913 - 1943); he recorded a career record of 330-284 (.537 win pct) and a 3.67 ERA over 5,571 innings. He won league ERA titles for the 1916 Marshalltown Ansons in the Central Association with a 1.41 ERA and the 1927 Houston Buffaloes of the Texas League with a 2.52 ERA.

He managed several minor league teams between 1934 and 1944, compiling a record of 437-636 (.407) and one pennant; he notably the Louisville Colonels of the American Association and the Bellingham Chinooks where he led them to the 1938 Western International League Pennant. He was a player/coach for the Sacramento Solons in 1941–1942. He was a scout for the St. Louis Cardinals from 1945 through 1957.
