= Parker Field =

American baseball stadium

- Interactive map of Parker Field
- Location: 1000 S. 12th Avenue; Yakima, Washington, U.S.
- Coordinates: 46.586°N 120.527°W
- Capacity: 2,500
- Surface: Natural grass

Construction
- Opened: 1937, 89 years ago

Tenants
- Yakima Bears (NWL) (1990–1992); Yakima Valley Braves (NWL) (1964–1966); Yakima Bears (NWL) (1955–1963); Yakima Bears (WIL) (1949–1954); Yakima Packers (WIL) (1948); Yakima Stars (WIL) (1946–1947); Yakima Pippins (WIL) (1937–1941)

Yakima (the United States)
Yakima (Washington (state))

Parker Field is a 2,500-seat baseball stadium in the northwest United States, located in Yakima, Washington. Opened 89 years ago in 1937 for the Yakima Pippins of the Western International League, it hosted various professional and amateur teams in the area prior to the opening of Yakima County Stadium in 1993.

The stadium is adjacent to Yakima Valley Community College and hosted the American Legion World Series in 1954, 1978, and 2001. The Yakima Beetles, the American Legion team based at Parker Field, won national titles in 1953, 1975, and 1979.

The stadium is named for attorney and businessman Shirley D. Parker (1888–1950) and his wife Eleanor, who donated the ten acres (4 ha) of land to the city for public park and amusement purposes. Parker grew up in Yakima, was a quarterback at the University of Washington in Seattle, organized the Western International League, and established the Yakima Pippins baseball club.

A fire in March 1962 destroyed the wooden grandstand, which was quickly rebuilt.

The natural grass playing field is at an approximate elevation of 1,060 feet (325 m) above sea level. It has an unorthodox orientation, aligned southeast (home plate to center field); recommended alignment is east-northeast. It was formerly aligned to the northeast.
