= James Mollison (disambiguation) =

James Mollison (1931–2020) was the director of the National Gallery of Australia.

James Mollison may also refer to:

- Jim Mollison (James Allan Mollison, 1905–1959), Scottish pioneer aviator
- James Mollison (general) (1897–1970), general of the United States Air Force
- James William Mollison, British specialist on agriculture
