= Earl Wentz =

American composer and pianist (1938–2009)

- Born: March 22, 1938; Charlotte, North Carolina, United States
- Died: November 15, 2009 (aged 71)
- Genres: Classical, musical theatre, opera, pop standards, sacred
- Occupations: Composer, pianist, musical director
- Instruments: Organ, piano
- Years active: 1950 — 2009
- Website: www.earlwentz.com, www.ewwwf.org

Earl Wentz (March 22, 1938 – November 15, 2009) was an American pianist, composer, and musical director most noted for his creation in 2000 of the American Composer Series, an ongoing performance series in the cabaret format.

== Early years ==
Wentz was born in Charlotte, North Carolina. He received his education at Wingate University, Queens College, the University of North Carolina, and through extensive private studies. Among his early teachers was concert pianist Winifred MacBride. He began his professional career at the age of 12, working as a pianist. By 15 he was also a professional organist, and thereafter added actor, singer, director, conductor, arranger, composer, and teacher to his impressive résumé.

== Career ==
Wentz composed the 1987 opera A Minuet, based on the play of the same name by Louis N. Parker. His Requiem, a one-hour work for four soloists, full chorus and orchestra, composed in 1989, drew the following comment from the opera star, Teresa Stratas: "God bless you. I loved it! It is a wonderful work. You have a tremendous gift."

The American Composer Series paid tribute to the greatest composers of popular American music on the American scene, particularly those composers associated with Tin Pan Alley and the Great American Songbook. From 2000 to 2009, under the direction of Wentz, the American Composer Series created 15 original revues, many of them returning for multiple runs over the years. Composers saluted in the series include Milton Ager, Harold Arlen, Nacio Herb Brown, Hoagy Carmichael, Sammy Fain, Ray Henderson, Victor Herbert, James V. Monaco, Richard Rodgers, Jule Styne, and Harry Warren. In 2006, the producers of the series broke the format somewhat for two performances to pay tribute to the series’ founder in “An American Composer Series Special Event.”

His credits include guest appearances with the Nashville, Charleston, Glenn Miller, and Jan Garber orchestras and at such varied venues as the Fontainebleau Hotel in Miami, The Greenbrier resort, and the United Nations. He has been featured on college lyceum programs and community concert series from coast to coast. In the 1960s, Wentz toured widely with singing team Doraine and Ellis as their accompanist.

Beginning in 1993, Wentz was the organist and choirmaster at John Street Methodist Church in New York, the oldest Methodist congregation in America. A noted and highly sought-after teacher, he taught and coached acting and vocal technique privately.

Amongst Wentz's vocal and acting students were: Pat Hingle, Kyle MacLachlan, James Price, Rip Torn, and Amy Wright.

Notable compositions in the years immediately prior to his death included the score for the controversial 1997 Off-Broadway musical The Marital Bliss of Francis and Maxine.

In October 2008 and April 2009, Wentz was guest artist for The Green Salon, a monthly program of the Global Change Foundation.

== Death ==
Wentz died on November 15, 2009, in Charlotte after an "extended illness".

== Recordings in print ==
Among Wentz's CDs currently in print are The Piano Stylings of Earl Wentz: Traditional Christmas Favorites, Vampin' Lady: The Music of Milton Ager, with vocalist Joyce Moody, and Visions of What Used to Be, a collection of popular songs from the World War I era, featuring vocals by Helen Breen.

The first of an anticipated four-volume set of Cole Porter music, What Is This Thing...?: Earl Wentz Plays Love Songs of Cole Porter, was released in March 2012 to great acclaim.

What Is This Thing...? was named as one of the top CDs of 2012.

== Continuation of work ==
In addition to the anticipated release of several recordings made prior to Wentz's death in 2009, The Earl Wentz and William Watkins Foundation was created in 2012 to continue the work of Earl Wentz. The foundation is "dedicated to the performance and preservation of the ... works ... and to fostering the teaching methods and ideals created and espoused by Earl Wentz for students of the arts, with particular emphasis on music and drama."
