= Mystery of the White Room =

- Directed by: Otis Garrett
- Written by: Alex Gottlieb; James G. Edwards (novel)
- Produced by: Irving Starr
- Starring: Bruce Cabot; Helen Mack; Joan Woodbury
- Cinematography: John W. Boyle
- Edited by: Harry Keller
- Music by: Charles Previn
- Production company: Universal Pictures
- Distributed by: Universal Pictures
- Release date: March 17, 1939
- Running time: 58 minutes
- Country: United States
- Language: English

Mystery of the White Room is a 1939 American horror mystery film directed by Otis Garrett and starring Bruce Cabot, Helen Mack and Joan Woodbury.

== Plot ==
A surgeon is killed during the middle of an operation when the hospital room is thrown into darkness. The police investigate to find out who is behind the murder.

== Cast ==
- Bruce Cabot as Dr. Bob Clayton
- Helen Mack as Carole Dale
- Joan Woodbury as Lila Haines
- Constance Worth as Ann Stokes
- Thomas E. Jackson as Sergeant Macintosh Spencer
- Tom Dugan as Hank Manley
- Mabel Todd as Dora Stanley
- Roland Drew as Dr. Norman Kennedy
- Addison Richards as Dr. Finley Morton
- Frank Reicher as Dr. Amos Thornton
- Frank Puglia as Tony
- Don Porter as Dr. Donald Fox

== Bibliography ==
- Tom Weaver & John Brunas. Universal Horrors: The Studio’s Classic Films, 1931–1946. McFarland, 2011.
