= My Dog, Buddy =

- Theatrical release poster
- Directed by: Ray Kellogg
- Written by: Ray Kellogg
- Produced by: Ken Curtis; B.R. McLendon; Gordon McLendon
- Starring: London; Travis Lemmond; Ken Curtis; Ken Knox
- Cinematography: Ralph Hammeras
- Edited by: Aaron Stell
- Music by: Jack Marshall
- Production companies: McLendon Radio Pictures; Hollywood Pictures Corp.
- Distributed by: Columbia Pictures
- Release date: August 1960
- Running time: 76 minutes
- Country: United States
- Language: English

My Dog, Buddy is a 1960 American adventure film directed by Ray Kellogg, and starring London, Travis Lemmond, Ken Curtis, and Ken Knox. The film was released by Columbia Pictures in August 1960.

== Cast ==
- London as Buddy
- Travis Lemmond as Ted Dodd
- Ken Curtis as Dr. Lusk
- Ken Knox as Dr. White
- James H. Foster as Jim Foster
- Jane Murchison as Jane Foster
- Bob Thompson as Salizar
- Jo Palmie as Nurse Lewis
- Judge Henry Dupree as Special Detective
- Chuck Eisenmann as Patrol Officer
- Gerry Johnson as Elizabeth Lynch
- Don Keyes as George Lynch
- William T. Babb as Fireman
- Desmond Dhooge as Kolinzky
- London the Dog as Buddy
- Bob Euler as Artist Fuller
- Honest Joe as Junkyard Owner
- C.B. Lemmond as Mr. Dodd
- Lilla Lemmond as Mrs. Dodd
- Bart McLendon as Junior Lynch
- Morris Mewbourn as Davis
- Angus G. Wynne III as Press Photographer (uncredited)
