= The Morey Amsterdam Show =

American television series 1948–1950

- Genre: Sitcom
- Starring: Morey Amsterdam
- Country of origin: United States
- No. of seasons: 3
- No. of episodes: CBS: 13; DuMont: 58

Production
- Running time: 23–25 minutes

Original release
- Network: CBS (1948-1949); DuMont (1949-1950)
- Release: December 17, 1948- March 7, 1949 (CBS) – April 21, 1949- October 12, 1950 (DuMont)

The Morey Amsterdam Show is an American sitcom that ran on CBS Television from December 17, 1948, to March 7, 1949, (13 episodes) and from April 21, 1949, to October 12, 1950, on the DuMont Television Network (58 episodes), for a total of 71 episodes.

== Synopsis ==
The show began on CBS Radio with Morey Amsterdam playing himself as the emcee at a fictional New York City nightclub, the "Golden Goose Cafe". He introduced musical and comedy acts, and performed songs and monologues himself. Art Carney played Charlie the Doorman and Jacqueline Susann was Lola the Cigarette Girl.

After six months on the radio, the show moved to CBS Television with the same characters, actors, and plot. The CBS version premiered December 17, 1948, and ended March 7, 1949, after 13 episodes. It was initially broadcast on Fridays from 8:30 to 9 p.m. Eastern Time. In January 1949 it began appearing on Mondays at various times.

The show was picked up by the DuMont Television Network and began broadcasting on April 21, 1949, from 9 to 9:30 p.m. E. T. on Thursdays, with a few minor changes. The name of the nightclub was changed to the "Silver Swan Cafe". Art Carney's character changed to Newton the Waiter, Susann continued as Lola, and Vic Damone joined the cast as a nightclub singer. The DuMont series ran for 58 episodes on Thursday evenings at 9:00 pm Eastern, until October 12, 1950, when it was replaced by The Adventures of Ellery Queen.

The DuMont version was sponsored by DuMont Laboratories, founded by Allen B. DuMont to produce television sets.

== Notable guest stars ==
The show's extensive roster of guest stars included Dottie Dean, Nancy Donovan, Mel Tormé, Rosemary Clooney, Charles "Honi" Coles, The Three Stooges, Cholly Atkins, Doraine and Ellis, Eileen O’Dare, Vic Damone, and Leo Guarniari. The announcers for the series were Don Russell, who was also the host for Guide Right, and musician Bobby Sherwood.

== Episode status ==
Several CBS Television episodes, and most of the DuMont episodes, exist at the UCLA Film and Television Archive. The J. Fred MacDonald collection at the Library of Congress has two episodes, though whether CBS or DuMont is not known. Selected DuMont episodes with lapsed or nonexistent copyright have been released on DVD by small DVD companies.

== See also ==
- List of programs broadcast by the DuMont Television Network
- List of surviving DuMont Television Network broadcasts
- 1949-50 United States network television schedule

== Bibliography ==
- David Weinstein, The Forgotten Network: DuMont and the Birth of American Television (Philadelphia: Temple University Press, 2004) ISBN 1-59213-245-6
