= Yakima County Stadium =

Baseball park in Yakima, Washington

- Interactive map of Yakima County Stadium
- Location: 1220 Pacific Avenue; Yakima, Washington
- Coordinates: 46.591°N 120.486°W
- Owner: Yakima County
- Capacity: 2,800
- Surface: Natural grass
- Field size: Left Field – 293 ft (89 m); Center Field – 406 ft (124 m); Right Field – 293 ft (89 m)

Construction
- Groundbreaking: 1992
- Opened: 1993, 33 years ago

Tenants
- Yakima Bears (NWL) (1993–2012); Yakima Valley Pippins (WCL) (2014–present)

Yakima (the United States)
Yakima (Washington (state))

Yakima County Stadium (the orchard) is a baseball park in the northwest United States, located in Yakima, Washington. Opened 33 years ago in 1993, it succeeded Parker Field and was the home field of the Yakima Bears minor league team for twenty seasons. It is the current home of the Yakima Valley Pippins collegiate wood-bat team of the West Coast League and has a seating capacity of 2,800.

At the northwest corner of the Central Washington State Fairgrounds, it is north of the Yakima SunDome, separated by a parking lot. The elevation of the natural grass playing field is just under 1,050 feet (320 m) above sea level, and it is aligned (home plate to center field) north-northeast.

Singer Bob Dylan played the venue during his Never Ending Tour in 2010 on September 3.

In 2013, Pacific Baseball Ventures, LLC were granted ownership of the Yakima Valley Pippins baseball team of the West Coast League. In 2014, the Pippins will fund a $100,000+ renovation to the stadium.

the 2022 improvement brought 1,500 New reserved Stadium seats to the stadium Replacing about 1,200 chairback seats and bench seating with back support and originally other improvements including a new roofing under the seating structure, replacement of aging and damaged elements on the structure and repairing and repainting several areas inside the ballpark
