= The Littlest Hobo =

Canadian television series

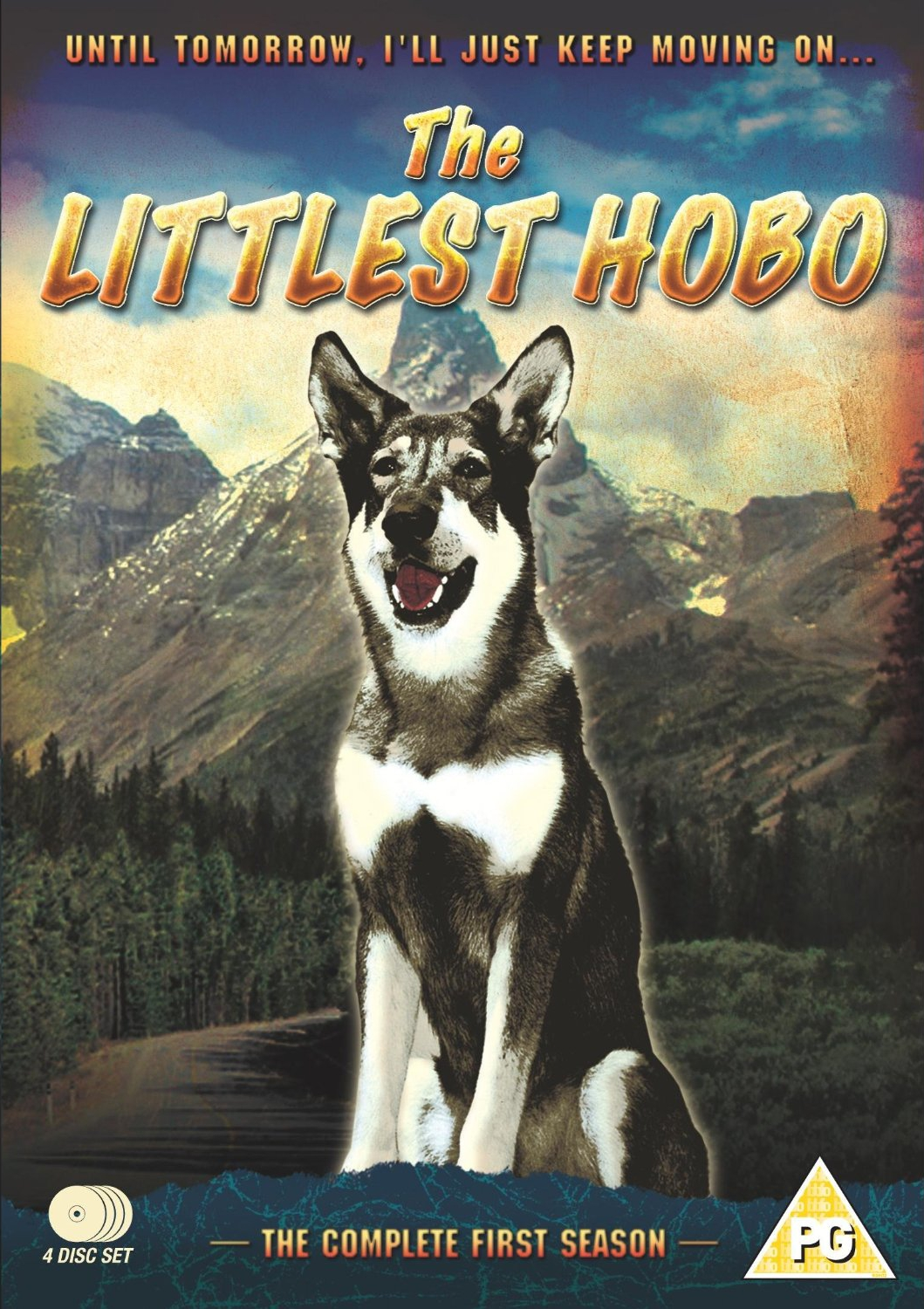
- The first season DVD cover
- Genre: Family/Children's; Adventure/drama
- Created by: Dorrell McGowan
- Starring: London (both series); Toro (original series); Litlon (original series); Thorn (original series)
- Theme music composer: Terry Bush and John Crossen (1979–1985 series)
- Opening theme: "Road Without End" by Jerry Scoggins (1963–1965 series) "Maybe Tomorrow" by Terry Bush (1979–1985 series)
- Composers: Gene Kauer and John Lackey (1963–1965 series); Jacques Urbont (1979–1985 series)
- Country of origin: Canada
- Original language: English
- No. of seasons: 2 (1963–1965 series); 6 (1979–1985 series)
- No. of episodes: 61 (1963–1965 series); 114 (1979–1985 series)

Production
- Executive producers: Ed Richardson (1979–1985 series, seasons 1–2); Gerry Rochon (1979–1985 series, seasons 3–6)
- Camera setup: Single
- Running time: 30 minutes (including commercials)
- Production companies: Canamac Pictures; Television Artists & Producers Corporation (first series); Glen-Warren Productions (second series)

Original release
- Network: Syndication
- Release: 1963 – 1965
- Network: CTV
- Release: October 11, 1979 – March 7, 1985

The Littlest Hobo (French: Le Vagabond) is a Canadian television series based upon a 1958 American film of the same name directed by Charles R. Rondeau. The series first aired from 1963 to 1965 in syndication, and was revived for a popular second run on CTV, spanning six seasons, from October 11, 1979, to March 7, 1985. The concept of the show is an ownerless dog who travels.

All three productions revolved around an extremely intelligent ownerless German Shepherd, the titular Hobo, who wanders from town to town, helping people in need. Despite the attempts of the many people whom he helped to adopt him, he heads off by himself at the end of each episode.

The dog is often referred to by the names given by his temporary human companions within the context of an individual episode, but is ultimately known only as Hobo across the context of the series as a whole. His origins, motivation, and ultimate destination are never explained in any of the shows.

== 1963–1965 series ==
The German Shepherd dogs featured in both 1960s and 1980s series were owned and trained by Chuck Eisenmann. The primary star was named London, but several of London's relatives, including Toro, Litlon, and Thorn, also played scenes as the Hobo. Eisenmann used his own training methods to work with his dogs which involved educating them to think and understand very specific directions, to recognize colours, and to understand English, French and German. He promoted his education method by touring with his dogs to offer live demonstrations, appearing on TV and radio shows and by writing books. Eisenmann recounts many stories from the filming of the series in his 1968 dog training book Stop! Sit! and Think. Other books he wrote include The Better Dog: The Educated Dog which contains updated training material and A Dog’s Day in Court which offers a dog's point of view towards training methods.

The dogs have "reverse mask" markings. After purchasing London, Eisenmann began to breed his own dogs, mostly studding out his males, even though he owned some females that he bred to as well. He bred particularly for the reverse mask, that is commonly seen on all of his dogs, and is unpopular with breeders of the German Shepherd, as it is not in the breed standard.

Shiloh Shepherd dogs are stated to trace their heritage back to London's relatives and are inspired by the intelligence Eisenmann's dogs were reputed to have.

The concept was well-suited for series television offering a variety of different settings for a road program, with an undemanding "star" and new slate of supporting human players every week. Some notable Hollywood guest stars included Pat Harrington Jr., Nita Talbot, Ellen Corby, Henry Gibson, and Keenan Wynn (the last two of which would also guest-star in the 1979–1985 revival series).

== 1979–1985 series ==
Title card of 1979–85 version

In 1979 CTV revived the series. The New Littlest Hobo (as it was sometimes called), which ran for six seasons, was shot on videotape rather than film. It has since been syndicated in many countries including the US and United Kingdom. In the course of its run, a mixture of well-known Canadian and Hollywood guest stars appeared such as Al Waxman, Carol Lynley, John Ireland, Megan Follows, Ted Follows, Rex Hagon, Alan Hale Jr., Jack Gilford, August Schellenberg, DeForest Kelley, Ray Walston, Morey Amsterdam, Jeff Wincott, Michael Wincott, Michael Ironside, Patrick Macnee, Abe Vigoda, Saul Rubinek, John Vernon, Wendy Crewson, Keenan Wynn (who also previously appeared in the original 1963–1965 series), Chris Makepeace, Karen Kain, Vic Morrow, Andrew Prine, Lynda Day George, Nerene Virgin, Tedde Moore, Sammy Snyders, Henry Gibson (who also previously appeared in the original 1963–1965 series), John Carradine, Leslie Nielsen, Anne Francis, Geraint Wyn Davies, and Jayne Eastwood. Mike Myers appears as Tommy in episode 10 "Boy on Wheels".

Eisenmann appeared as a dog trainer named Chuck in the first-season episode "Stand In" and as dog kennel operator named Mr. Charles in part one of the episode "Voyageurs" from the sixth season.

In a nod to the original series, the dog that appeared in this series was also credited as "London".

=== Plot ===
Plots ranged from the simple "dog-helps-person" stories to secret agent-type adventures.

In two-part, fifth-season episode "The Genesis Tapes" a scientist and a reporter theorized that Hobo was a type of superior canine. The reporter theorized that there was one dog and the scientist theorized that there were up to one hundred such dogs. The two-part episode had the scientist and reporter trying to capture Hobo to study him, with the reporter wanting a story and the scientist wanting to claim to be the first to discover the meta-canine as he put it. Both episodes feature flashback footage from the first five seasons of the series, with the first episode being the only episode of the revival series to include footage from the original 1960s series. At the end of the episode, Hobo found the evidence the reporter and scientist had collected and destroyed it, implying that Hobo did not want any evidence of his origins or nature to become public.

Trainer Eisenmann used several dogs to play the role of "London" as he had selected dogs entirely based on their appearance. He determined which dogs to use for the scenes by making use of their abilities such as if one dog did not mind carrying objects or if one were small enough to safely jump through a car window and manoeuvre through the seats. In Eisenmann's book, A Dog's Day in Court, one of the dogs used in the 1970s series was London's grandson, who was also known as London.

=== Theme music ===
The series' theme, "Maybe Tomorrow", was written by Terry Bush and John Crossen. The original was sung by Terry Bush. In 2005, Bush commercially released the song on his debut album, entitled Maybe Tomorrow. A NatWest advertisement promoting its credit card services featured the song, accompanied by animation of a dog wearing a NatWest credit card on its collar. The song was later used in a 2011 Dulux paint advertisement. Additionally, in 2017, the song was in a Canada 150-themed Co-Op stores advertisement.

== Telecast and home media ==
=== 1963–1965 series ===
The 1960s TV series was aired in syndication around the world, including the United Kingdom on ITV, Australia on the Nine Network between 1964 and 1967 and New Zealand on TV One. Sixty-one episodes were broadcast over two seasons.

Storer Programs Incorporated, a unit of the now-defunct Storer Broadcasting, distributed the series to U.S. television stations during its 1960s run.

Although the series was originally telecast in black and white, it was always produced in colour. VCI Entertainment released 12 episodes from the original series on DVD. The release features the colour versions of the first three episodes, except for their opening and closing sequences, which were only recovered in monochrome. The other nine episodes on the DVD are in black and white.

=== 1979–1985 series ===
The second series aired on CTV on Thursday nights at 7:30 p.m., and aired in the US in syndication during its original run. Repeats continued on CTV, CTV 2, and other national networks until 2012, when they were replaced with a block of music videos from Juicebox. CTV2 later resumed repeats of the second series. In the United Kingdom, the series premiered on the BBC on April 8, 1982, but only the first three seasons were shown and repeated until 1989. In April 1991, ITV picked up the show, and each of its companies played out the full series until late 1994.

Mediumrare Entertainment released the first two seasons of the second series on DVD. The Region 2 and Region 4 versions of their first-season DVD feature the theme tune "Maybe Tomorrow".

In 2017, some episodes from the series were uploaded onto Encore+, a YouTube channel run by the Canada Media Fund and Google Play in Canada. They have since been removed from the channel. In 2023, the entire series was available on CTV's website through the "CTV Throwback" lineup, but as of 2025 is no longer there. Repeats came back on Bell Media's CTV, CTV 2, and CTVWILD, and was available to stream in 2025 on Crave.

DVD Name	Episodes	Release dates		
DVD Name	Episodes	Region 1	Region 2	Region 4
Season One	24	N/A	April 26, 2010	Sept 2010
Season Two	18	N/A	September 6, 2010	N/A

== References in other Canadian media ==
- The Kids in the Hall S1.E16 (TV Episode 1990) Reference to "that german shepherd, Hobo"
- Trailer Park Boys S3.E1 The Kiss of Freedom (TV Episode 2003) Ricky watches this show near the end of the episode.
- Trailer Park Boys S10.E10 Looks like the liquor wins. (Netflix Episode 2016) At the end of the episode a variation on the intro song plays, as Julian rides away and Ricky and Bubbles find the letter he left them.
- Corner Gas S3.E5 The Littlest Yarbo (TV Episode 2005) Appearance of a German shepherd who acts like London, the Littlest Hobo.

== Reboot ==
In June 2026, a reboot was announced for Crave in conjunction with Lionsgate Canada and Point Grey Pictures.
