= Mabel Todd (actress) =

American actress (1907–1977)

- Born: August 13, 1907; Los Angeles, California, U.S.
- Died: June 2, 1977 (aged 69); Los Angeles, California, U.S.
- Occupation: Actress
- Years active: 1937–1946
- Spouses: Morey Amsterdam (m. 1933; div. 1945) Matthew A. Santino (m. 1947; div. 1950)

Mabel Todd (August 13, 1907 – June 2, 1977) was an American actress.

== Early years ==
Todd was from Glendale and attended the University of Southern California.

== Career ==
Todd performed in vaudeville as a singer, dancer, and comedian.

Todd appeared in films such as Varsity Show, Over the Goal, Hollywood Hotel, Gold Diggers in Paris, Garden of the Moon, The Cowboy and the Lady, The Mysterious Miss X, Mystery of the White Room, Street of Missing Men, Blues in the Night, The Talk of the Town, The Ghost and the Guest, In Society, A Wave, a WAC and a Marine, Down Missouri Way and Wife Wanted.

== Personal life ==
In 1932, Todd married Morey Amsterdam. They divorced in 1945. She married Matthew A. Santino on November 14, 1947, in Las Vegas, and they divorced on April 28, 1950.

On June 2, 1977, Todd died in Los Angeles, California. Todd is buried at Queen of Heaven Cemetery in Rowland Heights, California.

== Filmography ==
=== Film ===
Year	Title	Role	Notes
1937	Varsity Show	Cuddles	
1937	Over the Goal	Bee Travis	Uncredited
1937	Missing Witnesses	Mother at Railroad Station	Uncredited
1937	Hollywood Hotel	Dot Marshall	
1938	Gold Diggers in Paris	Leticia	
1938	Garden of the Moon	Mary Stanton	
1938	The Cowboy and the Lady	Elly	
1939	The Mysterious Miss X	Miss Annie Botts	
1939	Mystery of the White Room	Dora Stanley	
1939	Street of Missing Men	Dovie	
1941	Blues in the Night	Baby Beth Barton - Singer	Uncredited
1942	Tramp, Tramp, Tramp	Vivian	
1942	The Talk of the Town	Operator	Uncredited
1943	The Ghost and the Guest	Little Sister Mabel	
1944	In Society	Manicurist	Uncredited
1944	A Wave, a WAC and a Marine	Nurse	
1946	Down Missouri Way	Cindy	
1946	Wife Wanted	Florist	Uncredited, (final film role)
