= Street of Missing Men =

- Theatrical release poster
- Directed by: Sidney Salkow
- Screenplay by: Frank Dolan; Leonard Lee
- Story by: Eleanore Griffin; William Rankin
- Produced by: Armand Schaefer
- Starring: Charles Bickford; Harry Carey; Tommy Ryan; Guinn "Big Boy" Williams; Ralph Graves; John Gallaudet
- Cinematography: Ernest Miller
- Edited by: Ernest J. Nims
- Music by: Cy Feuer; William Lava
- Production company: Republic Pictures
- Distributed by: Republic Pictures
- Release date: April 25, 1939
- Running time: 65 minutes
- Country: United States
- Language: English

Street of Missing Men is a 1939 American drama film directed by Sidney Salkow and written by Frank Dolan and Leonard Lee. The film stars Charles Bickford, Harry Carey, Tommy Ryan, Guinn "Big Boy" Williams, Ralph Graves and John Gallaudet. The film was released on April 25, 1939, by Republic Pictures.

== Cast ==
- Charles Bickford as Cash Darwin
- Harry Carey as Charles Putnam
- Tommy Ryan as Tommy Blake
- Guinn "Big Boy" Williams as T-Bone
- Ralph Graves as Mike Reardon
- John Gallaudet as Kinsella
- Nana Bryant as Mrs. Putnam
- Mabel Todd as Dovie
- Regis Toomey as Jim Parker
