= American Composer Series =

The American Composer Series is an ongoing performance series in the cabaret revue format, paying tribute to the greatest composers of popular American music on the American scene, particularly those composers associated with Tin Pan Alley. Launched by musical director Earl Wentz in 2000 with a tribute to Ray Henderson (composer of mega-hits “Life is Just a Bowl of Cherries,” “Bye Bye Blackbird,” “Button Up Your Overcoat,” “The Birth of the Blues” and others) titled It’s the Cherries, the series has continued to add new shows to its repertoire at the rate of one or two per year. As of 2009, the American Composer Series had created some 15 original revue tributes, many of them returning for multiple runs over the years.

== American Composers and Shows in the Series ==
Each production in the series focuses on the work of one individual composer, working either alone or with a lyricist (or lyricists) by creating songs for the stage, screen, radio, or television. Composers saluted in the series so far include Milton Ager, Harold Arlen, Nacio Herb Brown, Hoagy Carmichael, Sammy Fain, Ray Henderson, Victor Herbert, James V. Monaco, Richard Rodgers (who required three separate shows to include his vast catalogue), Jule Styne, and Harry Warren.

Productions presented in the American Composer Series as of 2008 include:

- As Long As There’s Music (Jule Styne) - 2000
- The Darktown Strutters' Ball (Shelton Brooks, Maceo Pinkard, Spencer Williams) - 2009
- It’s the Cherries (Ray Henderson) – 2000, 2001
- Jubilee (Hoagy Carmichael) – 2000, 2001, 2004, 2005
- Love Is Where You Find It (Nacio Herb Brown) – 2002
- Ragtime Jimmie (James V. Monaco) – 2005
- Rodgers Without the H Factor (Richard Rodgers without Oscar Hammerstein or Lorenz Hart) – 2002
- Serenade (Harry Warren) – 2001
- Something Wonderful (Richard Rodgers with Oscar Hammerstein) – 2002
- Sweet Mystery (Victor Herbert) – 2005
- That Certain Smile (Sammy Fain) – 2007
- Vampin’ Lady (Milton Ager) – 2007, 2008
- With A Song in My Heart (Richard Rodgers with Lorenz Hart) – 2002
- Wizard (presented as part of the centennial celebration of Harold Arlen) – 2004, 2005

In 2006, the producers of the series broke the format somewhat for two performances to pay tribute to the series’ founder, Earl Wentz, in “An American Composer Series Special Event.”

== Critical response ==
The series has received recognition especially for bringing to light forgotten treasures from the American Songbook and combining these with more recognizable old standards.

== Latest Developments ==
Playing primarily in New York City, the American Composer Series has recently begun to branch out to other performance locations. In 2007, it premiered Vampin’ Lady: The Music of Milton Ager in New Hope, Pennsylvania and announced plans to tour the production beginning in September, 2008, in association with Sixpence, Inc., producers of the Vampin’ Lady CD, featuring vocalist Joyce Moody with musical director Earl Wentz. Currently in development is a tribute to composer Jimmy McHugh, presently named On the Sunny Side from McHugh's 1930 song On the Sunny Side of the Street.
