= The Ghost and the Guest =

1943 film

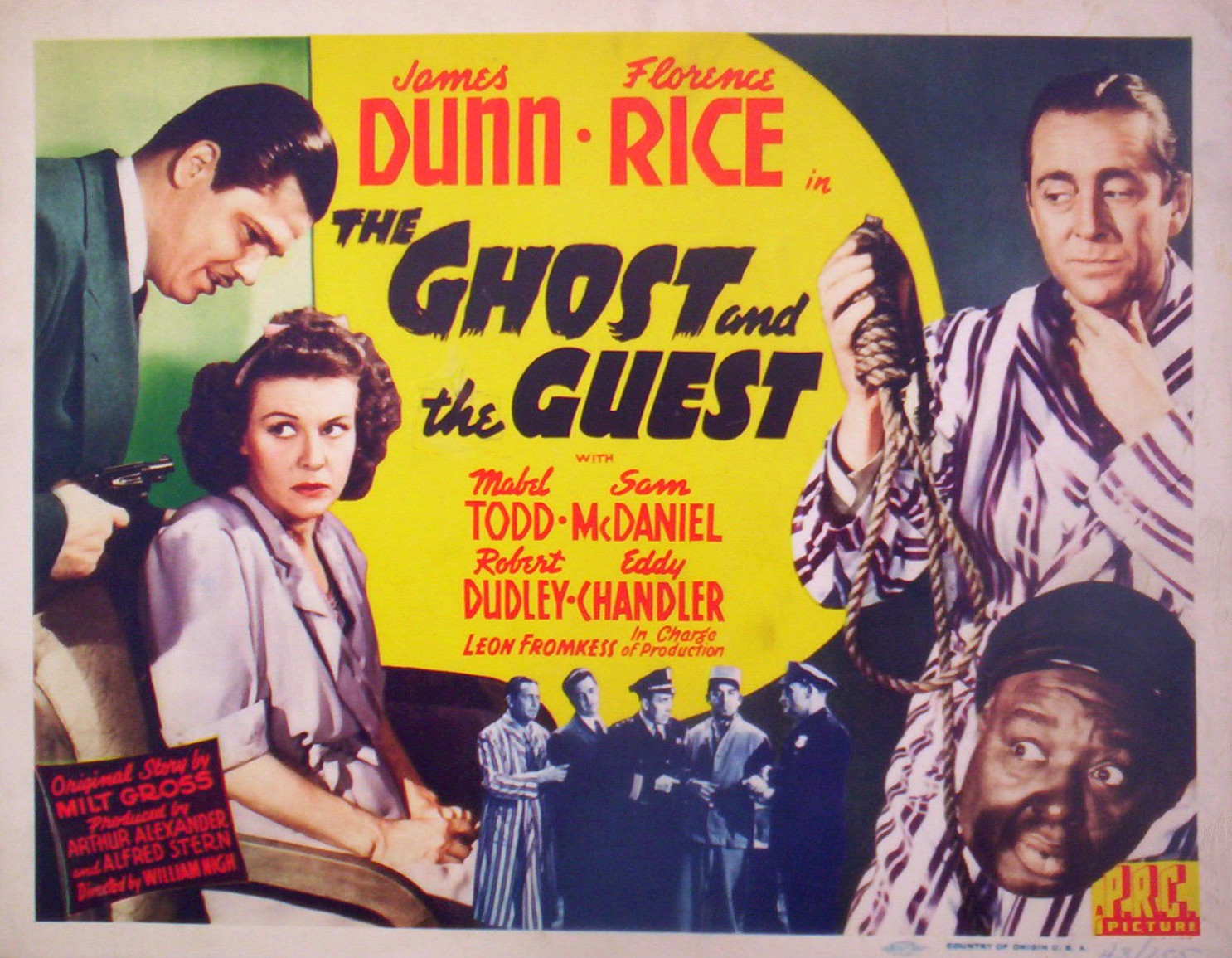
- Lobby card
- Directed by: William Nigh
- Written by: Milt Gross (original story); Morey Amsterdam (screenplay)
- Produced by: Arthur Alexander (producer); Alfred Stern (producer)
- Starring: James Dunn; Florence Rice; Robert Dudley; Sam McDaniel
- Cinematography: Robert E. Cline
- Edited by: Charles Henkel Jr.
- Music by: Lee Zahler
- Distributed by: Producers Releasing Corporation
- Release date: April 19, 1943
- Running time: 61 minutes
- Country: United States
- Language: English

The Ghost and the Guest is a 1943 American black-and-white comedy-mystery film directed by William Nigh and starring James Dunn, Florence Rice, Robert Dudley, and Sam McDaniel. The plot finds a newlywed couple honeymooning in a house they think is haunted but which is really overrun by a gang of criminals trying to recover stolen loot. Based on an original story by American animator Milt Gross, the screenplay was the first film script by comedian Morey Amsterdam.

== Plot ==
Webster Frye is looking forward to honeymooning with his new wife Jackie in California, but Jackie has her own ideas. She cancels their airplane tickets and arranges for Harmony, their chauffeur, to drive them to an old house in the country which her father has purchased for her. Outside the rundown property they meet Ben Bowron, a professional hangman who says the last criminal he executed, a jewel thief named Honeyboy, willed this house to him. Jackie ignores him and goes inside to investigate the house, which is dusty and unkempt. Meanwhile, the coffin of Honeyboy is brought to the house and Webster, feeling frazzled by the situation and his wife's inability to obey his wishes, calls the police to get rid of it. Behind the couple's backs, an escaped convict named Killer Blake sneaks out of the coffin and hides in a secret niche. A police chief who fancies himself a crime novelist and his deputy arrive on the scene, followed by a gang of criminals posing as Honeyboy's bereaved relatives and lawyer, whose real purpose is to locate Honeyboy's stolen jewels. Discovering the empty coffin, the police take everyone down to the cellar to search for the missing body, while Killer Blake sneaks around upstairs looking for Honeyboy's loot.

A frustrated Webster and Jackie have no privacy on their wedding night as the police order everyone to stay inside the house. Jackie, pretending she is Webster's gun moll, convinces Smoothie Lewis that Webster is really a tough gangster and deserves 75 percent of the haul. Webster discovers a hidden passageway and revolving wall in his bedroom closet, and takes Jackie with him down a secret stairway to search the cellar. Harmony also sees men "disappear" into a wall where he is sleeping. The group discovers a dummy on which Bowden practices his hanging technique, and a previously-dead man is found dangling from a noose. While Jackie is alone in her room, Killer Blake enters and threatens her, but Webster rescues her. Jackie discovers the stolen diamonds that Honeyboy hid in a Polynesian bust. After Blake and the gang of criminals are taken away to the police station, a real estate agent appears at the door explaining that this is not the house Jackie's father bought them, but the right one is a few miles down the road; however, that house has burned down. The agent offers to show them other properties for sale, but Webster pushes him away and decides they will honeymoon in California instead.

== Cast ==
- James Dunn as Webster Frye
- Florence Rice as Jacqueline "Jackie" DeLong Frye
- Robert Dudley as Ben Bowron
- Mabel Todd as Little Sister Mabel
- Sam McDaniel as Harmony Jones
- Jim Toney as Police Chief Bagwell
- Eddy Chandler as Policeman Herbie
- Robert Bice as Smoothie Lewis
- Renee Carson as Big Sister Josie
- Anthony Warde as Killer Blake
- Anthony Caruso as Henchman Ted
- Eddie Foster as Henchman Harold

== Production ==
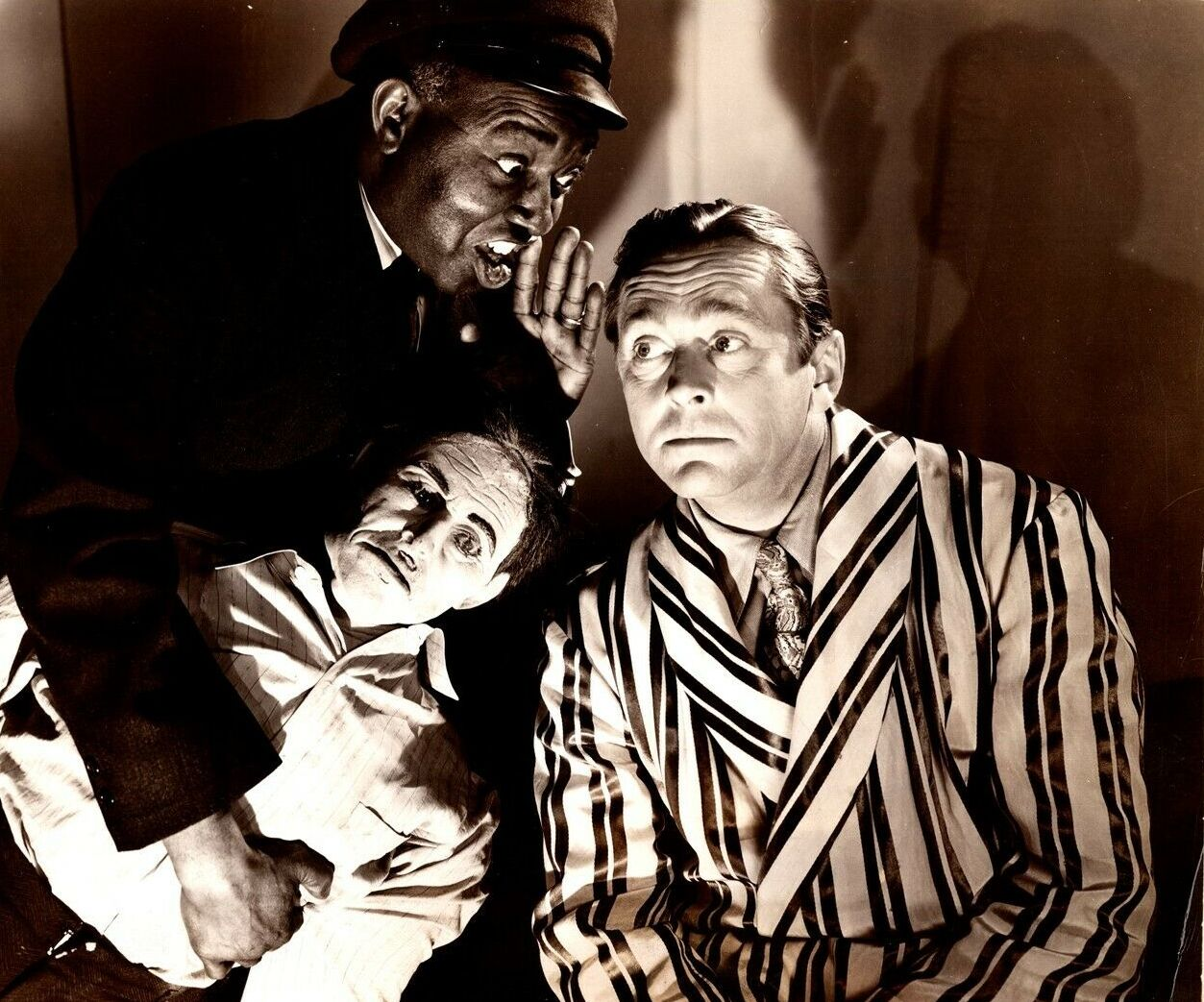
Sam McDaniel, James Dunn, and a dummy in a scene from the film

=== Development ===
The Ghost and the Guest is based on an original story by Milt Gross. The screenplay is the first film script by Morey Amsterdam, who previously wrote lyrics for the 1936 film With Love and Kisses.

The film was produced by Alexander-Stern Productions Inc., with Leon Fromkess credited as production supervisor.

=== Casting ===
James Dunn was making his first film appearance in two years after co-starring in the Broadway production of Panama Hattie with Ethel Merman. The Ghost and the Guest would be Florence Rice's last film role. Mabel Todd, who plays her typical dumb blonde role as Little Sister Mabel, was at the time the real-life wife of screenwriter Amsterdam.

=== Filming ===
Production began on February 1, 1943.

== Release ==
The Ghost and the Guest was released on April 19, 1943.

== Critical reception ==
Contemporary reviews were uncomplimentary. The New York Daily News panned the film, writing:

With so little of the dialogue really good, so many of the players downright bad, and so much time wasted in burlesqueing such appurtenances of mystery as sliding panels, secret passageways, prowling strangers and coffins without corpses, the film hasn't much to offer as a comedy or a thriller.

Lansing State Journal summed up the production as "another Milt Gross nightmare". The Harrisburg Telegraph termed Gross's original story "on the nut side in the usual Grossian manner". The Cincinnati Enquirer gave the film a "D" on its report-card rating system.

Modern-day reviews were more positive. Price called the film a "believable farce", crediting the director, screenwriter, and lead actors for pulling off a comedic tale a la James Thurber. Price commends director William Nigh for "treat[ing] the haunted-house gimmicks as the laughable clichés they had long since become", but also maintaining cinematic tension when it comes to "the genuine dangers that confront his characters". He calls Dunn's performance a "delight" and Rice's portrayal "engaging", and lauds cinematographer Robert E. Cline for his "richly composed photography" that adds polish to the production.

The 1998 Blockbuster Entertainment Guide to Movies and Videos gave the film three stars, calling it an "[e]njoyable B-comedy tingle". TV Guide also gave it a three-star rating, writing: "Secret passages and hidden panels make for some zany hocus-pocus". Bowkers Complete Video Directory 2003 writes: "James Dunn is at his wisecracking best in this lightning-paced laugh-a-minute haunted house farce". Halliwell's Film Guide calls the film a "predictable, mildly amusing second feature comedy-thriller".

According to Edwards, The Ghost and the Guest is one in a long line of Hollywood films that validate skepticism about paranormal activity by depicting "a haunted house that is not truly haunted".
