= Don't Worry, We'll Think of a Title =

1966 American comedy film directed by Harmon Jones

- Directed by: Harmon Jones
- Written by: Morey Amsterdam; John Davis Hart; William Marks; George Schenck
- Produced by: Morey Amsterdam
- Starring: Morey Amsterdam; Rose Marie; Richard Deacon
- Cinematography: Brick Marquard
- Edited by: Robert C. Jones
- Music by: Richard LaSalle
- Production company: Courageous-Kam Productions
- Distributed by: United Artists
- Release date: May 1966
- Running time: 83 minutes
- Country: United States
- Language: English

Don't Worry, We'll Think of a Title is a 1966 American absurdist slapstick comedy film directed by Harmon Jones and written by Morey Amsterdam, John Davis Hart, William Marks and George Schenck. The film stars Morey Amsterdam, Rose Marie, and Richard Deacon. At the time of the film's release, all three starred on The Dick Van Dyke Show.

The film was released in May 1966, by United Artists.

== Plot ==
Charlie Yuckapuck and Annie are a cook and waitress at the Daredevil diner. Their zany antics frequently annoy their employer, Mr. Travis, but amuse the diner's other waitress, Magda. The diner attracts all sorts of various figures, ranging from employees that work at the factory across the street, Danny Thomas, and even a Soviet spy, Comrade Olga, who is sent to observe Charlie. Olga's superiors - led by the diminutive "Mr. Big" - believe Charlie to be defecting Soviet cosmonaut Yasha Nudnik, who is hiding sensitive information.

A lawyer comes and announces Magda has inherited a bookstore located on a college campus. Shortly after, Mr. Travis fires Charlie and Annie for their incompetence. Charlie and Annie go to work at Magda's bookstore, followed by Olga. She believes the bookstore to be haunted, and asks Charlie to stay there. Charlie and Annie read that Nudnik is suspected to be at the university for a science convention, and subsequently help numerous odd customers at the store, including two customers who frequently come in and out of the back of the store.

Charlie and Annie become suspicious of Jim Holliston, a friend of Magda's lawyer who comes to help her organize the store's financial records. When someone breaks into the store, Holliston advises Magda not to call the police. After hearing noises one night, Charlie and Annie investigate in the basement, but are scared off after finding the two customers hiding behind the wall. Another night, Charlie and Annie discover a trap door and revolving bookcase in the store. In a secret passageway behind the bookcase, the two find the body of a KEB agent.

During the murder investigation, Holliston eventually reveals himself to be a government agent. He reveals to Charlie his resemblance to Nudnik, and that the KEB are after him thinking he is Nudnik.

While attending a Beatnik party at a fraternity, Charlie is targeted by Magda and her partner. One of the fraternity members shows a romantic interest in Annie, only for her to be dragged away by Charlie. The two run back to the bookstore, where the members of the spy ring have Magda bound and gagged. Charlie and Annie manage to defeat them using the trap door, and smashing a vase over the head of Olga's partner. They are arrested along with the two customers, who turn out to be bank robbers digging a tunnel between the bookstore and a bank neighboring the store. The film ends with Charlie reading from a small note asking the audience not to reveal the end of the film.

== Cast ==
- Morey Amsterdam as Charlie Yuckapuck
- Rose Marie as Annie
- Richard Deacon as Mr. Travis / Police chief
- Joey Adams as 1st Digger
- Andy Albin as 2nd Digger
- Henry Corden as Professor Lerowski
- Michael Ford as Jim Holliston
- Jack Heller as Mr. Big
- Tim Herbert as Seed / Samu
- Peggy Mondo as Fat KEB agent
- Carmen Phillips as Comrad Olga
- January Jones as Magda Anders

Cameos

- Danny Thomas as Diner Customer
- Forrest Tucker as Romantic Diner Customer
- Moe Howard as atty. Crumworth Raines
- Milton Berle as Bookstore Rope Customer
- Irene Ryan as Granny
- Steve Allen as Bookstore Customer
- Cliff Arquette as KEB Agent
- Carl Reiner as Bald Bookstore Customer
- Nick Adams as KEB Agent

== Reception ==
Film historian Leonard Maltin in his Movie Guide gave the picture his lowest rating ("BOMB"), calling it a "Grade-Z shambles..." and stating, "Start worrying when you turn it on."

== See also ==
- List of American films of 1966
