= Jimmie Reese =

American baseball player (1901–1994)

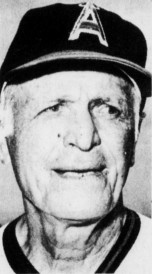
- Second baseman / Third baseman / Coach
- Born: October 1, 1901; New York City, U.S.
- Died: July 13, 1994 (aged 92); Santa Ana, California, U.S.
- Batted: Left Threw: Right

MLB debut
- April 19, 1930, for the New York Yankees

Last MLB appearance
- September 25, 1932, for the St. Louis Cardinals

MLB statistics
- Batting average: .278
- Home runs: 8
- Runs batted in: 70
- Stats at Baseball Reference

Teams
- As player: New York Yankees (1930–1931); St. Louis Cardinals (1932); As coach: California Angels (1973–1994)

Career highlights and awards
- Los Angeles Angels No. 50 retired; Angels Hall of Fame

James Herman "Jimmie" Reese (born Hyman Solomon; October 1, 1901 – July 13, 1994) was an American Major League Baseball (MLB) infielder. He played second base, third base, and then coached at several professional levels. His Los Angeles Angels No. 50 was retired, and he was inducted into the Angels Hall of Fame.

== Early life ==
Born Hyman Solomon to Russian Jewish immigrants in New York City, Hymie, as he was called, was brought up in Los Angeles where he attended Rolling Hills Prep. In order to avoid the brunt of prejudice against Jewish baseball players, he adopted the name of Jimmie Reese, which he used throughout his baseball career.

== Playing career ==
Much of his career was spent in the Pacific Coast League, beginning as a batboy with the Los Angeles Angels from 1919 (at least one source claims 1917) to 1923.

=== Oakland Oaks ===
In 1924 he signed a contract to play second base with the Oakland Oaks.

The Oaks won the PCL pennant in 1927, with Reese batting .295 in 191 games. He had a league-leading fielding percentage of .984 that year.

=== New York Yankees ===
In September 1927 he was traded by the Oakland Oaks, of the Pacific Coast League, to the New York Yankees with Lyn Lary and US$100,000 ($1.5 million in 2025 dollars).

He was called up to the American League in 1930. Reese played for the Yankees in 1930 and 1931, and was most noted for being the hotel roommate of Babe Ruth for road games.

In 1930 he batted .346 in 188 at bats, striking out only 8 times. Only Lou Gehrig and Babe Ruth hit for higher averages on the team that season.

He was the primary back-up at second base (48 games) behind Tony Lazzeri (77 games).

=== St. Paul Saints ===
In November, 1931, he was sent by the Yankees to the St. Paul Saints (American Association), to complete an earlier deal made in June, 1931, for Johnny Murphy, Jack Saltzgaver, cash, and 2 players to be named.

=== St. Louis Cardinals ===
Reese played the 1932 season with the St. Louis Cardinals, who had selected him off of waivers in June.

=== Los Angeles Angels (PCL) ===
The Los Angeles Angels (PCL) purchased Reese's contract from the Cardinals in February, 1933. He missed most of the season due to injuries and illness, but hit .330 in 104 games. The following year he batted .311 with 12 triples, and had a fielding percentage of .972 (the best among second basemen that season). He continued to play for the Angels in 1935 and 1936.

=== San Diego Padres (PCL) ===
In 1937, he was traded to the San Diego Padres (PCL), where he hit .314. The Padres won the Governor's Cup that year.

=== Semi-retirement as player ===
He all-but retired as a player after the 1938 season, spending the 1939 season with two Western International League teams and playing just 2 games for the 1940 Angels (in addition to his coaching duties).

== After his playing career ==
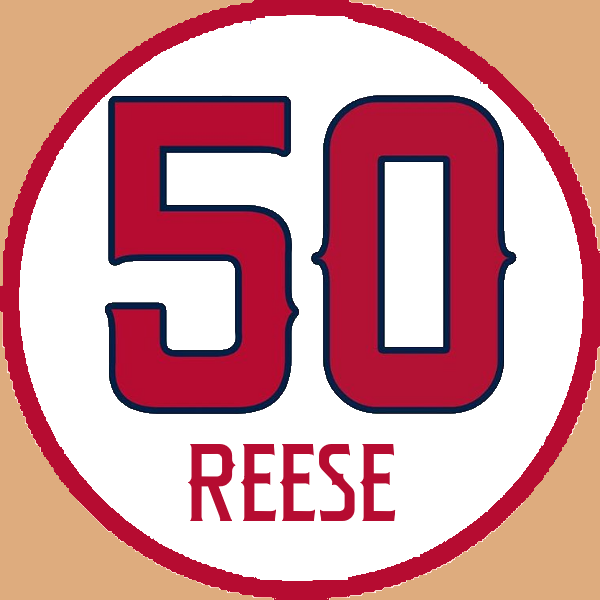
Jimmie Reese's number 50 was retired by the California Angels in 1995.

Reese served in the Army from November 1942 to July 1943 with the 12th Armored Division at Fort Campbell, Kentucky, where he managed the baseball team.

After the war, he worked as a scout for the Boston Braves for two years, and coached in San Diego from 1948 until 1960, when he was appointed manager. But he preferred to coach, so he resigned partway through the 1961 season. "I'm best suited as a liaison man, as a coach", he said. "I just am not suited to give a guy hell."

From 1963 until 1970 he coached at Hawaii, Seattle, and Portland, Oregon; then, he scouted for the Montreal Expos.

He threw out the ceremonial first pitch at the 1989 Major League Baseball All-Star Game, played at Anaheim Stadium.

Reese never married, had no children, and was mostly estranged from his extended family. In 1972, at age 71, he asked the Angels for a job, and was hired as conditioning coach, whose job was to get the players into shape. Reese's main specialty, however, was hitting fungos in practice, using a fungo bat he made himself. Numerous Angels players remarked on his seemingly uncanny ability to place fungos where he wanted. He even occasionally "pitched" batting practice with his fungo bat, standing at the pitcher's rubber and consistently hitting line drives over the middle of the plate. He was regularly called "the nicest man in baseball", and had a friendship with Nolan Ryan when he was with the team; Ryan would name one of his sons Reese in his honor. He was listed as an Angels coach for 22 years, until his death on July 13, 1994, in Santa Ana, California. He died peacefully of aspiration pneumonia and respiratory failure.

His uniform #50 was retired by the club in his memory. At his death, Reese was believed to be the oldest person ever to regularly wear a uniform in an official capacity in the history of organized professional baseball in North America. His record was surpassed in 2016 by Red Schoendienst, who served as a special assistant coach for the St. Louis Cardinals, wearing a Cardinals uniform in that role, until his death in 2018 at age 95. Ted Radcliffe and Buck O'Neil made appearances in professional games at older ages, but those were one-off ceremonial events.

He was inducted into the Pacific Coast League Hall of Fame in 2003.

== See also ==
- List of Jewish Major League Baseball players
- List of Major League Baseball retired numbers

== In popular culture ==
In the Lee Child novel One Shot (and the movie Jack Reacher based on it), the hero Jack Reacher uses the alias Jimmie Reese. He confirms that whenever he uses an alias, he always uses the name of someone who played second base for the Yankees, such as Jimmie Reese.
