= Life Is Just a Bowl of Cherries =

1931 popular music song

Single by Rudy Vallée & His Connecticut Yankees
- Published: 1931 by De Sylva, Brown and Henderson
- Genre: Foxtrot
- Label: RCA Victor
- Songwriters: Ray Henderson; Lew Brown

"Life Is Just a Bowl of Cherries" is a popular song with music by Ray Henderson and lyrics by Lew Brown, published in 1931. Ethel Merman introduced this song in George White's Scandals of 1931. A Rudy Vallée version, recorded in 1931, achieved success. The song was revived in 1953 by singer Jaye P. Morgan.

The song title gave rise to the revue of Henderson's music called It's the Cherries, which launched the American Composer Series in 2000.

== Notable recordings ==
- Rudy Vallée & His Connecticut Yankees – 1931 single
- Jack Hylton - 1931
- Leslie "Hutch" Hutchinson - 1931
- Layton & Johnstone - 1931
- Jaye P. Morgan – 1953 single; debuted on December 19, 1953 and peaked at number 26 on the Billboard pop charts in 1954.
- Doris Day – The Love Album (1967), and My Heart (2011)
- Judy Garland – Judy (1956)
- Johnny Mathis featuring Forever Plaid – Mathis on Broadway (2000)
- Lisa Loeb recorded the song as the title track to the 2007 EP Cherries

== In popular culture ==
- In the 1981 Steve Martin mock musical, Pennies From Heaven, a performance of the song by Walter S. Harrah, Gene Merlino, Vern Rowe, Robert Tebow and Al Vescovo is used in a cutaway segment in which Martin, Bernadette Peters, and Jessica Harper lip sync to the song.
- The song is featured in the soundtrack for the 1983 documentary Seeing Red (1983 film).
- It is the opening song of the Broadway show Fosse, as sung by Ben Vereen.
- The song is featured in the soundtrack for the 2012 movie Killing Them Softly, starring Brad Pitt.
- The song is twice sung in the 2013 movie Adoration starring Robin Wright, Naomi Watts, and Ben Mendelsohn.
