= Alan Strange =

American baseball player (1906-1994)

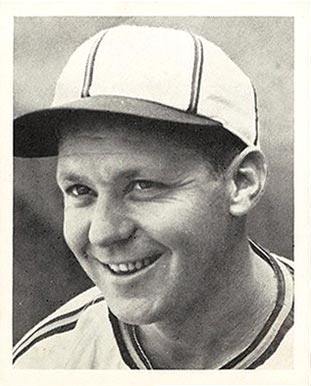
- Shortstop
- Born: November 7, 1906; Philadelphia, Pennsylvania, U.S.
- Died: June 27, 1994 (aged 87); Seattle, Washington, U.S.
- Batted: Right Threw: Right

MLB debut
- April 17, 1934, for the St. Louis Browns

Last MLB appearance
- August 16, 1942, for the St. Louis Browns

MLB statistics
- Batting average: .223
- Home runs: 1
- RBI: 89
- Stats at Baseball Reference

Teams
- St. Louis Browns (1934–1935; 1940–1942); Washington Senators (1935)

Alan Cochrane Strange (November 7, 1906 – June 27, 1994) was an American professional baseball player and manager. A shortstop, he appeared in 314 Major League Baseball games during all or parts of five seasons (1934–35; 1940–42) with the St. Louis Browns and Washington Senators. He was born in Philadelphia, and attended Northeast High School, alma mater of fellow big leaguers Benny Culp, Bill Hoffman, Bert Kuczynski, Jesse Levis and Eddie Stanky. He also attended Penn State University.

As a baseball player, he threw and batted right-handed, and was 5 feet 9 inches (1.75 m) tall and weighed 162 pounds (73 kg). After five full seasons in the minor leagues, Strange made his Major League debut on April 17, 1934, at the age of 27 as a member of the Browns.

Strange would go on to hit .223 during a big-league career spent mostly with the Browns, although he did spend 20 games in 1935 with the Senators. He hit his lone Major League home run on September 2, 1934, against Phil Gallivan of the Chicago White Sox at Sportsman's Park. In the field, Strange had a .960 career fielding percentage.

Strange played his final MLB game on August 16, 1942,. Much of his minor league career occurred in the top-level Pacific Coast League for the Hollywood Stars, Seattle Rainiers and Bremerton Bluejackets. He managed the Rainiers for the final half of the 1959 PCL season.

On June 27, 1994, Strange died in Seattle, Washington. He is buried there at Calvary Cemetery.

== Major transactions ==
- On December 14, 1933, Strange was sent from Hollywood of the PCL to the Browns for Jim Levey and Wally Hebert.
- On June 29, 1935, the Browns sent Strange to the Senators for Lyn Lary.
- On October 3, 1939, the Browns drafted Strange back from a PCL team in the Rule 5 draft.

== Other facts ==
- Strange did not play any major league baseball in 1936, '37, '38 or '39.
- Strange got his nickname "Inky" because he worked as a printer in the off-season.
- Strange was a teammate of Harlond Clift for five years-longer than any other teammate.
- As the Phillies' batboy, Strange saved a bat broken by Rogers Hornsby as a memento. In 1934, as manager of the Browns, Hornsby installed Strange as his shortstop.
- Strange wore three numbers in his career. From 1934 to 1935 with the Browns, he wore 1. In the 20 games he spent with the Senators in 1935, he wore 28. During his tenure with the Browns from 1940-'42, he wore 2.
