= Yakima Valley Braves =

- 1937–1966; (1937-1941, 1946-1966); Yakima, Washington

Minor league affiliations
- Class: Class A (1952-1964); Class B (1937-1951)
- League: Western International League (1937–1941, 1946–1954); Northwest League (1955–1966)

Major league affiliations
- Team: Milwaukee/Atlanta Braves (1958–1966); Pittsburgh Pirates (1946)

Minor league titles
- League titles (7): 1950; 1956; 1958; 1959; 1960; 1963; 1964

Team data
- Name: Yakima Valley Braves (1965–1966); Yakima Bears (1949–1964); Yakima Packers (1948); Yakima Stars (1946–1947); Yakima Pippins (1937–1941)
- Ballpark: Parker Field

The Yakima Valley Braves, was the final name of a minor league baseball club, located in Yakima, Washington, playing from 1955 to 1966 as members of the Northwest League. Yakima hosted professional baseball regularly from 1937 through 1965 with a brief hiatus between 1942 and 1945 due to World War II. Playing under various names, Yakima was a member of the Western International League.

== History ==
Prior to the Western International League franchise, the Yakima Indians played in the Class B Pacific Coast International League in 1920 and 1921, winning a championship in its final season.

The Pippins were the club to represent Yakima, starting in 1937. The franchise used the Pippins name through 1941 when the club suspended operations. Likewise, the Western International League suspended play after the 1942 season. The Pippins name was resurrected in by the Yakima Valley Pippins of the collegiate wood bat West Coast League.

The League resumed play in 1946 with Yakima returning to the field under a new name, the Stars. The Stars were affiliated with the Pittsburgh Pirates in 1946. In 1948 the club changed names again to the Yakima Packers. The Packers finished the season in last place.

In 1949 the club adopted a new moniker, the Yakima Bears. In their first season the Bears advanced to the post-season. The Bears defeated the Spokane Indians in the semi-final series, but were swept by the Vancouver Capilanos in the championship. The following season the Bears posted a record on 92–58 to claim the league championship. In 1956 won their second league title, finishing the year at 86–45.

The team's home field, Parker Field, was built in 1937. It caught fire in 1962 but was rebuilt. The team remained in Yakima through 1966.

Professional baseball returned to Yakima in 1990. The Northwest League franchise revived Yakima Bears playing as an affiliate of the Los Angeles Dodgers and Arizona Diamondbacks until 2012.

== Season-by-season record ==
Season	PDC	Division	Finish	Wins	Losses	Win%	Postseason	Manager	Attendance
Yakima Pippins
1937			1st	80	61	.567		Ray Jacobs	54,000
1938			1st	77	55	.583	Defeated Wenatchee in semi-final series 3-1; Lost to Bellingham in championship series 4-3	Ray Jacobs	No record
1939			5th	72	73	.497		Ray Jacobs	No record
1940			2nd	79	67	.541	Lost to in semi-final series to Tacoma 2-1	Goldie Holt	No record
1941			3rd	70	64	.522		Goldie Holt	No record
Yakima Stars
1946	PIT		5th	71	69	.507		Spencer Harris	No record
1947			8th	59	95	.383		Harlond Clift	86,004
Yakima Packers
1948			8th	52	109	.323		Hub Kittle	73,600
Yakima Bears
1949			1st	99	51	.660	Defeated Spokane in semi-final series 3-1; Lost to Vancouver in championship series 3-0	Joe Orengo	133,917
1950			1st	92	58	.613	League champion by virtue of record	Joe Orengo	117,790
1951			5th	63	80	.441		Bill Brenner	60,018
1952			4th	73	79	.480		Dario Lodigiani	64,044
1953			6th	70	74	.486		Dario Lodigiani	59,100
1954			1st	80	57	.584		Lou Stringer	66,571
1955			5th	59	69	.461		Hub Kittle	36,314
1956			1st	86	45	.656	League champion by virtue of record	Hub Kittle	66,370
1957			3rd	69	66	.511		Hub Kittle	56,718
1958	MLN		2nd	76	60	.559	Defeated Lewiston in championship series 4-1	Hub Kittle	64,974
1959	MLN		4th	70	69	.504	Defeated Salem in championship series 4-1	Hub Kittle	43,895
1960	MLN		1st	85	57	.599	League champion by virtue of record	Buddy Hicks	60,166
1961	MLN		2nd	79	60	.568	Lost to Lewiston in championship series 4-1	Buddy Hicks	42,806
1962	MLN		4th	69	71	.493		Buddy Hicks	35,059
1963	MLN		1st	84	56	.600	Defeated Lewiston in championship series 3-1	Buddy Hicks	40,628
1964	MLN		3rd	72	68	.514	Defeated Eugene in championship series 3-0	Hub Kittle	39,300
Yakima Valley Braves
1965	MLN		5th	62	77	.446		Hub Kittle	36,050
1966	MLN		3rd	39	44	.470		Eddie Haas	13,262

Division winner	League champions

== Notable alumni ==
- Rico Carty (1962) MLB All-Star; 1970 NL Batting Title
- Mike Lum (1965)
- Lee Maye (1955)
- Denis Menke (1961) 2 x MLB All-Star
- Felix Millan (1965) 3 x MLB All-Star
- Carl Morton (1965) 1970 NL Rookie of the Year
- Bill Robinson
