= Yakima Valley Pippins =

- Logo

Information
- League: West Coast League (South)
- Location: Yakima, Washington
- Ballpark: Yakima County Stadium
- Founded: 2013
- League championships: 0
- Division championships: 2 (2014, 2021)
- Colors: Green, light blue and white
- Mascot: Scott T. Pippin
- Ownership: Pacific Baseball Ventures Yakima, LLC
- Management: Justin Henriksen (General Manager)
- Coach: Kyle Krustangel

The Yakima Valley Pippins are a collegiate wood bat baseball team based in Yakima, Washington. They are member of the West Coast League and began play in 2014 at the 2,800 seat Yakima County Stadium. They replaced the Yakima Bears of the Northwest League, who relocated to Hillsboro, Oregon, and were renamed the Hillsboro Hops. They were named for the pippin apple. On August 6, 2014, the Pippins were the first WCL expansion franchise to win a divisional pennant, beating the Cowlitz Black Bears 6-5 in the bottom of the 9th inning. After missing the playoffs in 2015, the Pippins returned to post season play, winning the 2nd Half South Division Title. The Pippins hold the West Coast League record for most wins in their first two seasons going 64-44 in 2014-2015.

The Pippins saw immediate success after entering the league. The team clinched finished with a winning season in their first four seasons including three playoff appearances and a division title in 2014. The team made their first WCL Championship appearance in 2021 and followed up with an additional playoff appearance the season after.

== History ==
=== 2013 ===
The Pippins are the latest West Coast League (WCL) team. Pacific Baseball Ventures LLC owns both the Yakima Valley Pippins and the Walla Walla Sweets baseball team that also plays in the WCL. Because of the expansion team in Yakima, the WCL moved from a two-division format to a three-division format with an MLB playoff order. In May 2014, the Pippins reached an agreement to have 21 of their home games broadcast in Spanish. KDNA 91.9 FM will be the station broadcasting the 21 games out of Yakima.

=== 2014 ===
After Pacific Baseball Ventures was awarded the Yakima expansion team in the late part of the 2013 year, PBV began restoring the field. In the inaugural season for the Pippins. The Pippins were the second team to make the playoffs in the first season of play. With a 35-19 record and the WCL East Division pennant, the Pippins housed the WCL MVP for the 2014 year. Vince Fernandez had 10 home runs and 51 runs batted in, setting the record in both of those categories. In the first year of play at Yakima County Stadium, the Pippins had an attendance of 42,898 in 34 home games.

=== 2024 ===
On June 3, Carson Judd was announced as the league's pitcher of the week. Judd pitched six scoreless innings and threw eight strikeouts against the Drifters the previous Saturday night.

On July 9, Preston Allen and Spencer Shipman were selected to represent the Pippins in the 2024 All Star Game in Bellingham.

The Pippins failed to qualify for the playoffs for the second straight season.

=== 2025 ===
On July 8, Ty Pangborn (Akron) was selected to represent the Pippins at the All Star Game in Bellingham.

The Pippins failed to improve on their 20-33 record from the previous season. The Pippins went 14-40 and finished last in the South Division. Pearson Pollard (Texas A&M Corpus Christi) finished second in the league with forty-five strikeouts. 23,116 total fans attended the Pippins' twenty-seven home games for an average of 856 fans per game.

The Pippins were eliminated from playoff contention for the fourth straight season. The Pippins clinched their worst record in team history and the worst record of any team in the 2025 season.

The Pippins were purchased from Pacific Baseball Ventures by a group of 11 Yakima families on September 30th, 2025. Led by new General Manager, Jordan Rowland.

=== 2026 ===
Josh Mawhinney was named player of the week by the league on June 1st.

== Results by Season ==
Season	League	Division	Finish	Wins	Losses	Win%	GB	Postseason	Manager
2014	WCL	East	1st	35	19	.648	0	Lost Division Series 0-2 (Bellingham)	Marcus McKimmy
2015	WCL	East	2nd	29	25	.537	5.5	Did Not Qualify	Marcus McKimmy
2016	WCL	South	2nd	32	22	.593	2	Lost Division Series 0-2 (Corvallis)	Marcus McKimmy
2017	WCL	South	2nd	28	26	.519	6	Lost Division Series 1-2 (Corvallis)	Marcus McKimmy
2018	WCL	North	4th	27	27	.500	8	Did Not Qualify	Marcus McKimmy
2019	WCL	North	5th	21	33	.389	18	Did Not Qualify	Marcus McKimmy
2020	Season cancelled (COVID-19 pandemic)								
2021	WCL	North	1st	29	19	.604	0	Won Division Series 2-1 (Bellingham); Lost Championship Series 1-2 (Corvallis)	Kyle Krustangel
2022	WCL	South	4th	29	25	.537	10	Lost Divisional Series 1-2 (Corvallis)	Kyle Krustangel
2023	WCL	South	7th	20	34	.370	19	Did Not Qualify	Kyle Krustangel
2024	WCL	South	5th	20	33	.377	20.5	Did Not Qualify	Kyle Krustangel
2025	WCL	South	9th	14	40	.259	29	Did Not Qualify	Garrett DeGallier
2026	WCL	South	7th	21	33	.388	10	Did Not Qualify	Kyle Krustangel

League champions	Division champions	Playoff Team

== Notable players ==
- Eli Morgan (born 1996), MLB pitcher, Chicago Cubs
- Reed Garrett (born 1993), MLB pitcher, New York Mets
- Christian Koss (born 1998), MLB Catcher, San Francisco Giants
- Jake Bird (born 1995), MLB pitcher, New York Yankees
- Wyatt Mills (born 1995), MLB pitcher, Los Angeles Dodgers
- Jonny Deluca (born 1998), MLB Outfielder, Tampa Bay Rays
- Kenny Rosenberg (born 1995), MLB pitcher, Los Angeles Angels
