= Dad Clarke =

American baseball player (1865–1911)

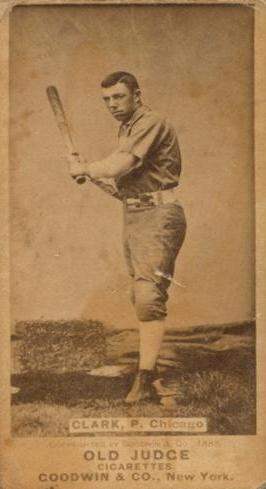
- Baseball card of Clarke
- Pitcher
- Born: January 7, 1865; Oswego, New York, U.S.
- Died: June 3, 1911 (aged 46); Lorain, Ohio, U.S.
- Batted: Both Threw: Right

MLB debut
- April 23, 1888, for the Chicago White Stockings

Last MLB appearance
- October 15, 1898, for the Louisville Colonels

MLB statistics
- Win–loss record: 44–51
- Earned run average: 4.16
- Strikeouts: 175
- Stats at Baseball Reference

Teams
- Chicago White Stockings (1888); Columbus Solons (1891); New York Giants (1894–1897); Louisville Colonels (1897–1898)

William H. "Dad" Clarke (January 7, 1865 – June 3, 1911) was an American professional baseball pitcher. He played in Major League Baseball from 1888 to 1898 for the Chicago White Stockings, Columbus Solons, New York Giants, and Louisville Colonels.
