= Yakima Bears =

- 1990–2012; Yakima, Washington
Team logo
Cap insignia

Minor league affiliations
- Class: Class A-Short Season
- League: Northwest League
- Division: East Division

Major league affiliations
- Team: Arizona Diamondbacks (2001–2012); Los Angeles Dodgers (1990–2000)

Minor league titles
- League titles (2): 1996; 2000
- Division titles (4): 1991; 1994; 1996; 2000

Team data
- Colors: Cardinal red, black, gray, white
- Ballpark: Yakima County Stadium (1993–2012); Parker Field (1990–1992)

The Yakima Bears were a minor league baseball team in the northwest United States, located in Yakima, Washington. The Bears competed at the Class A Short Season level as members of the Northwest League from 1990 to 2012. Following the 2012 season, the franchise relocated to Hillsboro, Oregon, and became Hillsboro Hops.

== History ==
After 23 summers without minor league baseball, Yakima returned to the Northwest League in 1990. The Salem Dodgers moved from Salem after the 1989 season, bringing with them their affiliation with the Los Angeles Dodgers.

In 2001, the Bears changed their affiliation to the Arizona Diamondbacks.

=== Relocation to Hillsboro ===
The Yakima Bears had been frustrated by the lack of progress on a new stadium that would meet minor league standards, even though a new stadium was built and opened in 1993 to meet similar demands, and a declining local economy. The Triple-A Portland Beavers of the Pacific Coast League had departed for Tucson after the 2010 season, so the Portland metropolitan area was without minor league baseball. In 2011, the city of Vancouver, Washington, presented a proposal on May 13 for a new ballpark to be built on the Clark College campus, ready to host the Yakima Bears franchise for the 2012 season.

After that deal fell through, the team received an offer sheet from Hillsboro, a suburb west of Portland, in June 2012 with plans to start play there in a new ballpark in 2013. Four months later on October 16, the team announced its upcoming move to Hillsboro and was renamed the Hillsboro Hops for the 2013 season. The Hops proceeded to win the 2014 and 2015 Northwest League championships.

The Bears were replaced one year later with the formation of the Yakima Valley Pippins of the West Coast League.

== Early Yakima Baseball ==
The history of baseball in Yakima stretches back 106 years ago to 1920 with the short-lived Yakima Indians of the Class B level Pacific Coast International League. The Indians lasted only two seasons, closing in 1921 as the league became the Western International League in 1922.

Yakima entered the WIL in 1937 as the Yakima Pippins, reflecting the local area's apple-growing heritage, lasting until the 1941 season due to World War II. In 1946, as the WIL resumed play, Yakima again fielded a team, this time named the Yakima Stars, with their own team airplane. Renaming themselves the Yakima Packers for the 1948 season, the team finally settled on the Yakima Bears in 1949, lasting through the reformation of the WIL into the Northwest League, as the Bears became a charter member of the seven-team Class B NWL in the 1955 season. The team played at Parker Field, constructed in 1937 for the Pippins.

The Bears' time in the early years of the NWL were fruitful, as they won six league titles in nine years (1956, 1958, 1959, 1960, 1963, and 1964). A fire in March 1962 destroyed the wooden grandstand at Parker Field, which was quickly rebuilt. In April 1964, the team was renamed the Yakima Braves, due to an agreement with the Milwaukee Braves, their parent club since 1958. The team played as the Braves for three seasons, through 1966. The 1966 season was the first for the NWL as a short season league.

== Ballparks ==
The Bears played at Yakima County Stadium. The park still is in use today, located at 1220 Pacific Avenue, Yakima, Washington. The stadium remains in use today and is the current home of the Yakima Pippins of the West Coast League. Prior to 1993 the Bears played at Parker Field, located at 1000 S. 12th Avenue.

== Season-by-season record ==
Season	PDC	Division	Finish	Wins	Losses	Win%	Postseason	Manager	Attendance
Yakima Bears
1990	LAD	North	2nd	36	40	.474		Jerry Royster	71,892
1991	LAD	North	1st	44	32	.579	Lost to Boise in championship series 2-0	Joe Vavra	81,835
1992	LAD	North	2nd	36	40	.474		Joe Vavra	65,684
1993	LAD	North	4th	30	46	.395		John Shoemaker	86,822
1994	LAD	North	1st	49	27	.645	Lost to Boise in championship series 2-1	Joe Vavra	85,483
1995	LAD	North	4th	27	48	.360		Joe Vavra	81,570
1996	LAD	North	1st	40	36	.526	Defeated Eugene in championship series 2-1	Joe Vavra	82,313
1997	LAD	North	4th	23	53	.303		Joe Vavra	80,003
1998	LAD	North	4th	32	44	.321		Tony Harris	76,049
1999	LAD	North	4th	33	43	.434		Dino Ebel	74,977
Yakima Bears
2000	LAD	East	1st	41	35	.539	Defeated Eugene in championship series 3-2	Butch Hughes	68,905
2001	ARI	East	3rd	33	42	.440		Greg Lonigro	59,000
2002	ARI	East	4th	23	53	.303		Mike Aldrete	56,404
2003	ARI	East	2nd	45	31	.592		Bill Plummer	60,037
2004	ARI	East	4th	35	41	.461		Bill Plummer	51,544
2005	ARI	East	4th	30	46	.395		Jay Gainer	60,150
2006	ARI	East	4th	28	48	.368		Jay Gainer	63,400
Yakima Bears
2007	ARI	East	4th	33	43	.434		Mike Bell	70,117
2008	ARI	East	4th	28	48	.368		Bob Didier	72,207
2009	ARI	East	4th	28	48	.368		Bob Didier	72,881
2010	ARI	East	2nd	43	33	.566	Lost to Spokane in division series 2-0	Bob Didier	70,695
2011	ARI	East	4th	33	43	.434		Audo Vicente	66,545
2012	ARI	East	3rd	36	40	.474		Audo Vicente	61,895

Division winner	League champions

== Notable ex-Bears ==
- Pedro Astacio – 14-year MLB pitcher
- Dick Barrett - MLB pitcher, member of Pacific Coast League Hall of Fame
- Peter Bergeron – outfielder for Montreal Expos
- Pete Coscarart – infielder for Brooklyn Dodgers and Pittsburgh Pirates, 1941 All-Star, 1941 World Series, Brooklyn Dodgers HOF
- Collin Cowgill - 6-year MLB outfielder
- Matt Davidson - third baseman with Chicago White Sox
- Ryan Doherty - beach volleyball professional who played three seasons of minor league baseball in Diamondbacks system
- Wayne Franklin - MLB pitcher 2000-06
- Carlos Gonzalez – Colorado Rockies outfielder, 2010 NL batting champion, 3-time All-Star
- Matt Herges – 10-year MLB pitcher
- Koyie Hill – MLB catcher 2003-14
- Todd Hollandsworth – Rookie of the Year outfielder for Los Angeles Dodgers
- Ender Inciarte - All-Star outfielder for Atlanta Braves
- Conor Jackson – Arizona Diamondbacks first baseman
- Paul Konerko – Chicago White Sox first baseman, 6-time All-Star, 2005 World Series champion
- Ted Lilly – 14-year MLB pitcher, 2-time All-Star
- Wade Miley – Baltimore Orioles pitcher
- Scott Proctor – pitcher for three MLB teams
- Jason Repko – outfielder for three MLB teams
- Mark Reynolds – first baseman for Colorado Rockies
- Damian Rolls – MLB third baseman drafted by Los Angeles Dodgers
- David Ross - World Series Champion with Chicago Cubs and Boston Redsox
- Chad Tracy – 10-year MLB third baseman
- Dan Uggla – MLB second baseman 2006–15, three-time All-Star
- Shane Victorino – MLB outfielder 2003–15, two-time World Series champion

Preceded by Salem Dodgers	Northwest League franchise 1990–2012	Succeeded by Hillsboro Hops
