= Morey Amsterdam =

American actor and comedian (1908–1996)

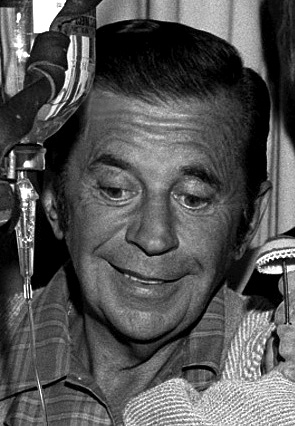
- Amsterdam in 1970
- Born: Moritz Amsterdam; December 14, 1908; Chicago, Illinois, U.S.
- Died: October 28, 1996 (aged 87); Los Angeles, California, U.S.
- Resting place: Forest Lawn Memorial Park Cemetery in Hollywood Hills, California
- Occupations: Actor; comedian; writer; producer
- Years active: 1922–1996
- Spouses: Mabel Todd (m. 1933; div. 1945) Kay Patrick (m. 1949)
- Children: 2

Moritz "Morey" Amsterdam (December 14, 1908 – October 28, 1996) was an American actor, comedian, writer, and producer. Between 1948 and 1950, he hosted his own TV sitcom The Morey Amsterdam Show. He played Buddy Sorrell on CBS's The Dick Van Dyke Show from 1961 to 1966.

== Early life ==
Moritz Amsterdam (Yiddish: מאָריץ אַמסטערדאַם) was born in Chicago, Illinois, the youngest of the three sons of Max and Jennie (née Finder) Amsterdam, Jewish immigrants from Austria-Hungary. (Note: Some biographies list him as born in San Francisco because his father was a violinist with the San Francisco Symphony.)

He began working in vaudeville in 1922 as the straight man for his older brother's jokes. He was a cellist, a skill he used throughout his career. By 1924, he was working in a speakeasy operated by Al Capone.

After being caught in the middle of a gunfight, Amsterdam moved to California and worked writing jokes.

== Career ==
=== Radio ===
In the late 1940s, Amsterdam had a program on CBS from 9:30 to 10 pm Eastern Time on Tuesdays and a daily program on WMGM in New York City.

=== Television ===
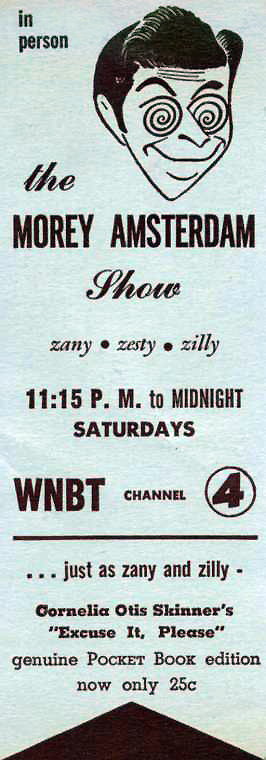
Bookmark promotion for Amsterdam's late-night NBC show

Amsterdam had a program on CBS that ended in early 1949.

In 1950, he briefly hosted the comedy-variety show Broadway Open House, TV's first late-night entertainment show, on NBC. One of the pioneering TV creations of NBC president Pat Weaver, it demonstrated the potential for late-night programming and led to the later development of The Tonight Show.

In February 1952, Amsterdam made his dramatic TV debut on an episode of the DuMont Television Network series Not for Publication. Also in 1952, he was host of Breakfast With Music, a 9:00 am, Monday-Friday program on WNBT-TV in New York City.

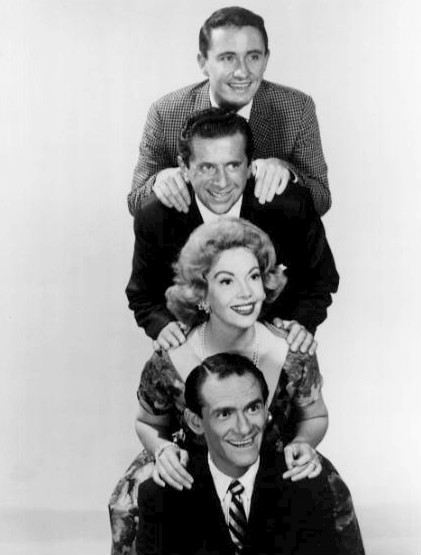
Game show Keep Talking (1959) with host Merv Griffin, Amsterdam, Jayne Meadows, and Danny Dayton

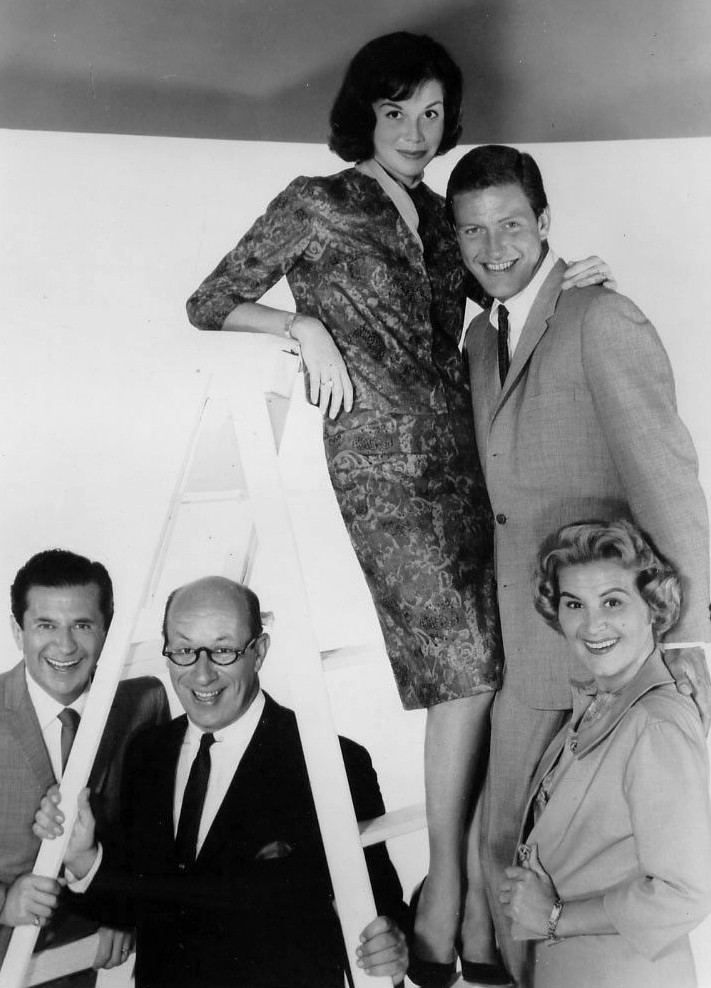
The Dick Van Dyke Show cast: Amsterdam, Richard Deacon, Mary Tyler Moore, Dick Van Dyke, and Rose Marie, 1962

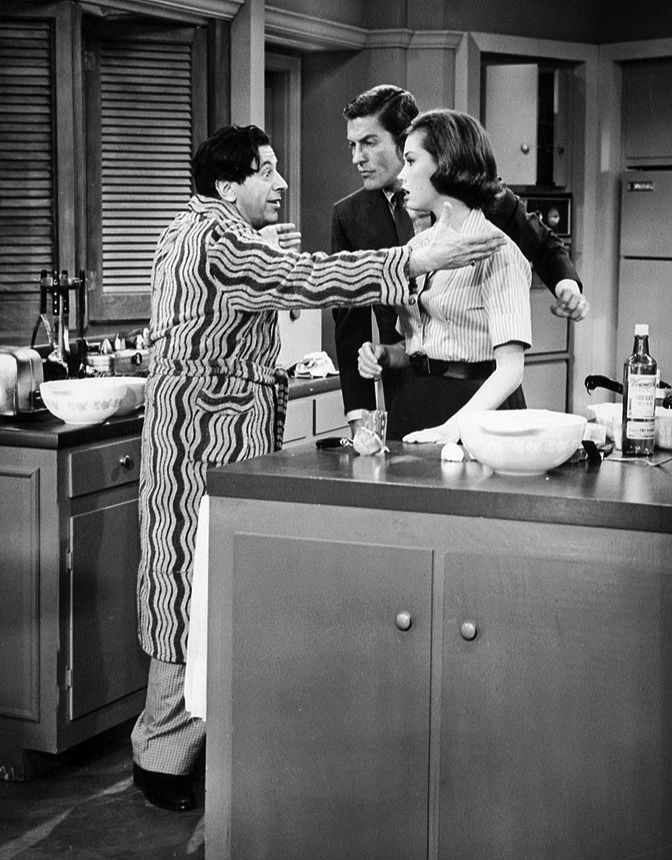
Amsterdam as Buddy, in this episode the house guest of Rob and Laura Petrie's on The Dick Van Dyke Show (1962)

In 1957, he appeared as "Jack Connors" in the third episode ("The Three Pretenders") of the syndicated television sitcom How to Marry a Millionaire, with Barbara Eden and Merry Anders.

In 1958, he appeared as saloon manager Lucien Bellingham in an episode of the CBS Western series Have Gun – Will Travel entitled "The Moor's Revenge". He later guest-starred on the CBS sitcom Pete and Gladys, with Harry Morgan and Cara Williams.

His best-known role was as comedy writer Buddy Sorrell on The Dick Van Dyke Show, a role suggested for him by his friend Rose Marie, who also appeared on the show.

The show's creator, Carl Reiner, based the character on his old friend Mel Brooks, with whom he worked on the writing staff of Your Show of Shows. Like Amsterdam himself, Buddy had a ready quip for any situation, and one of the show's most popular running gags was his insult-laden feud with producer Mel Cooley (Richard Deacon). One scene had Mel walking into the writers' room asking, "Well, what have you got for me?" Buddy immediately answered "Hatred!" Buddy was also one of the rare overtly Jewish characters on TV in that era, with one episode revolving around his belated decision to have a bar mitzvah. Amsterdam also wrote lyrics for the show's theme song, which were never heard on the air, but have been performed by Dick Van Dyke in concert. Van Dyke sang those lyrics on the October 23, 2010, edition of the NPR show Wait Wait... Don't Tell Me!. The composer of the tune, Earl Hagen, was made aware of the lyrics when David Van Deusen arranged it as a gift for Dick Van Dyke on his 70th birthday. Van Deusen, the other DVD, shared the story of the lyrics with Hagen after Amsterdam's death.

In a November 1970 episode of The Partridge Family, titled "Did You Hear the One About Danny Partridge?", Amsterdam played the role of Ziggy Shnurr, a small-time joke writer, whom Danny found in the Yellow Pages after deciding that the family music act needed some comedy during song breaks. The Amsterdam role echoed his Dick Van Dyke character. The episode also guest-starred Hollywood veteran Jackie Coogan.

In a November 1980 episode of The Littlest Hobo, entitled "Fast Freddie", the Hobo discovers a con man (Amsterdam) operating in a small town and tries to foil his plans to rob a doddering senior.

Amsterdam was an occasional panelist on Match Game and the short-lived Can You Top This? (which he also executive produced) during the 1970s. He appeared as a small-time criminal in several episodes of the soap opera The Young and the Restless in the 1990s. Amsterdam and Rose Marie later appeared as panelists on The Hollywood Squares, an October 1993 episode of Herman's Head, and guest-starred together in a February 1996 episode of the NBC sitcom Caroline in the City (his final TV appearance).

=== Films ===
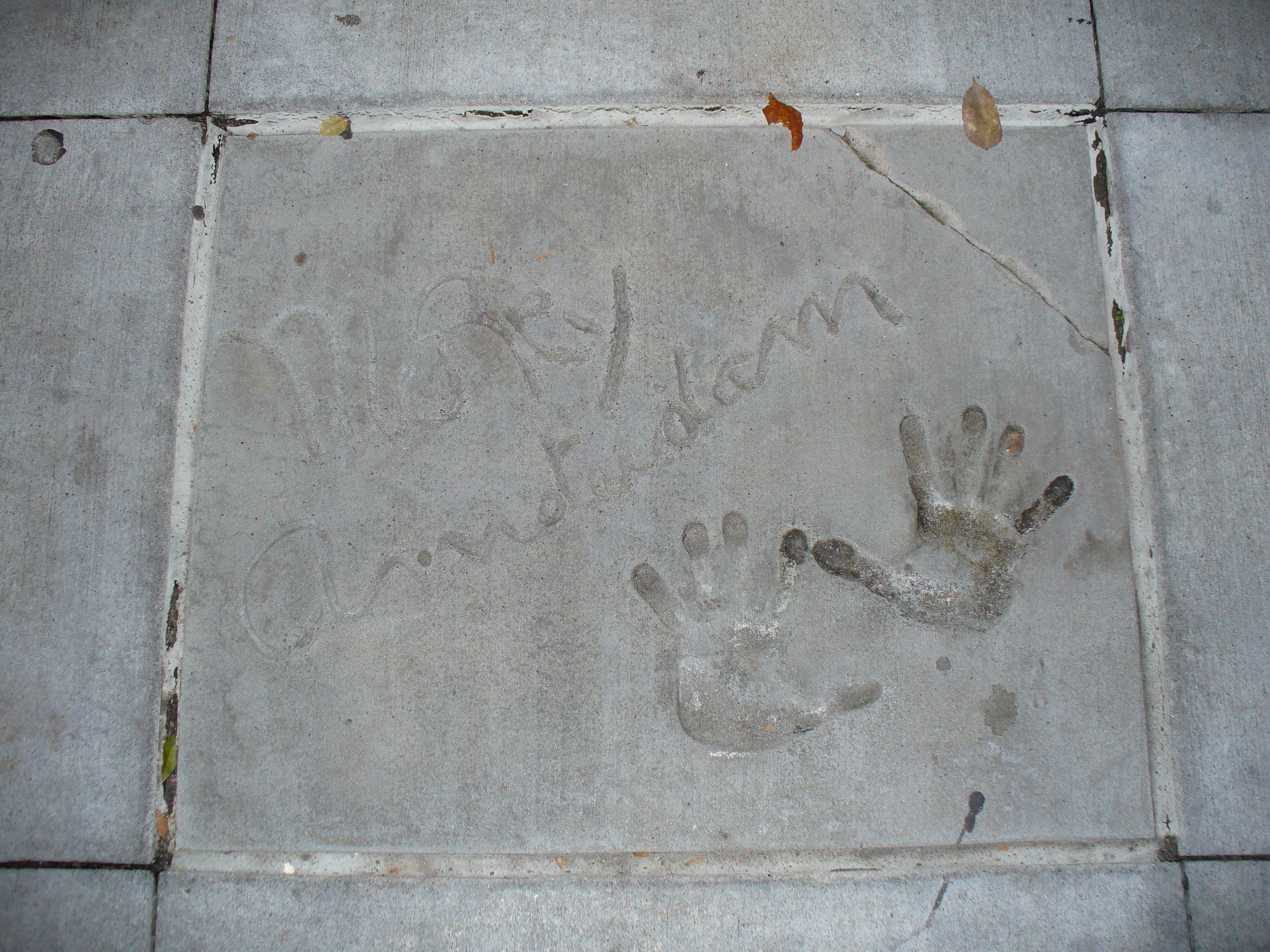
Amsterdam's handprints in front of Theater of the Stars at Walt Disney World's Disney's Hollywood Studios theme park

In 1958, Amsterdam appeared in the low-budget film Machine-Gun Kelly with Charles Bronson, and he did a notable dramatic turn in the 1960 noir classic Murder, Inc. as Catskill nightclub owner Walter Sage, the first victim (according to the film) of the newly minted Murder, Incorporated.

Amsterdam played Cappy, owner of the local nightclub, in two Beach Party movies of the 1960s, which were produced by American International Pictures, of which he was vice president. Rose Marie and he also co-starred in the 1966 film Don't Worry, We'll Think of a Title, a comedy co-written and co-produced by Amsterdam. The film features Richard Deacon, their co-star on The Dick Van Dyke Show, with cameos by the show's co-producer Danny Thomas and co-star Carl Reiner as well as Steve Allen, Milton Berle, Irene Ryan, and Moe Howard of the Three Stooges. His later roles included appearances in The Horse in the Gray Flannel Suit (1968), Won Ton Ton, the Dog Who Saved Hollywood (1976), When Nature Calls (1985), and Side by Side (1988).

== Personal life ==
Amsterdam married actress Mabel Todd in 1933; they divorced in 1945. He married his second wife Kay Patrick in 1949; they remained married until his death in 1996.

=== Rum and Coca-Cola ===
Morey occasionally delved into novelty-music writing, as well. Two of his credits are "Why Oh Why Did I Ever Leave Wyoming" and "I Can't Get Offa My Horse." While visiting Trinidad in September 1943 as part of a U.S.O. tour, Amsterdam obtained a local hit song, "Rum and Coca-Cola", composed by Lionel Belasco, with lyrics by Rupert Grant, a calypso musician who used the stage name Lord Invader. Amsterdam applied for and was issued a US copyright for the song, published in the United States with Amsterdam listed as lyricist and Jeri Sullivan and Paul Baron as composers. When the Andrews Sisters' recording of the song became a worldwide hit, Belasco and Lord Invader sued for copyright infringement of the song's music and lyrics, respectively. In 1948, after years of litigation, both plaintiffs won their cases, with Lord Invader receiving an award of $150,000 in owed royalties. However, Morey Amsterdam was allowed to retain copyright to the song.

Amsterdam is credited as the writer of the calypso song "True, Mon, True (Dot is the Actual Fact)" performed by Mary Tyler Moore in the "Somebody Has to Play Cleopatra" episode of The Dick Van Dyke Show (season two, episode 14, originally broadcast December 26, 1962). The song originated in the c. 1945 all-black revue Before Broadway, also known as The Wishing Tree.

=== Hanna-Barbera lawsuit ===
In 1963, Amsterdam filed a $12,000 lawsuit against Hanna-Barbera for breach of contract; he claimed that he had been cast and signed to the role of George Jetson on The Jetsons. Although his contract stipulated that he would be paid $500 an episode, with a guarantee of 24 episodes (i.e., a full season) of work, he recorded only one episode before being replaced by George O'Hanlon. The change may have occurred because of sponsor conflict with Amsterdam's role on The Dick Van Dyke Show. Hanna-Barbera won the lawsuit in early 1965.

== Death ==
Amsterdam died at Cedars Sinai Hospital in Los Angeles on October 28, 1996, at the age of 87, due to a heart attack.

== Filmography ==
=== Film ===
Year	Title	Role	Notes
1936	With Love and Kisses	TV Performer	Uncredited
1943	The Ghost and the Guest		script writer
1952	Columbia Animal Cavalcade 1: Chimp-Antics	Commentator	
1958	Machine-Gun Kelly	Michael Fandango	
1960	Murder, Inc.	Walter Sage	
1962	Gay Purr-ee	Narrator	Voice
1963	Beach Party	Cappy	
1963	It's a Mad, Mad, Mad, Mad World	Uncle Mike	Voice, uncredited
1964	Muscle Beach Party	Cappy	
1966	Don't Worry, We'll Think of a Title	Charlie Yuckapuck	
1968	The Horse in the Gray Flannel Suit	Charlie Blake	
1993	Sandman	Car Salesman	

=== Television ===
Year	Title	Role	Notes
1948–1950	The Morey Amsterdam Show	Himself	
1953	Jimmy Hughes, Rookie Cop	Unknown role	1 episode
1955	The Mickey Mouse Club	Himself	1 Episode
1957	The Gale Storm Show: Oh! Susanna	Mr. Agnew	Episode: "Checkmate"
1957	December Bride	Herbert	Episode: "Mountain Climbing"
1957	The O. Henry Playhouse	Phineas C. Gooch, Manny Stettner	3 episodes
1957	How to Marry a Millionaire	Jack Connors	Episode: "The Three Pretenders"
1957	Matinee Theatre	Unknown role	2 episodes
1957–1963	The Danny Thomas Show	Buddy Sorrell, Mr. Simmons	2 episodes
1958	The Adventures of Jim Bowie	Pinky	Episode: "Choctaw Honor"
1958	Gunsmoke	Cicero Grimes	Episode: "Joe Phy"
1958	Schlitz Playhouse	Mr. Braxton	Episode: "T Shot a Powler"
1958	Dragnet	Unknown role	Episode: "The Big Ruthie"
1958	The Phil Silvers Show	Harry Harris	Episode: "Bilko's Giveaway"
1958	Have Gun - Will Travel	Lucien Bellingham	Episode: "The Moor's Revenge"
1959	The Further Adventures of Ellery Queen	J.C. Smith	Episode: "Dance Into Death"
1961	Pete and Gladys	Fred	Episode: "Gladys Rents the House"
1961–1966	The Dick Van Dyke Show	Buddy Sorrell	158 episodes
1962	Mister Magoo's Christmas Carol	Brady, James (voices)	Television film
1964	The Famous Adventures of Mr. Magoo	Unknown role (voice)	Unknown episodes
1966	Daktari	Sammy Spotts	Episode: "The Chimp Who Cried Wolf"
1967	Black, Kloke & Dagga	Dagge (voice)	Television short
1968	That's Life	Unknown role	Episode: "Life in Suburbia"
1969–1973	Love, American Style	Bodkin	2 episodes
1970	The Partridge Family	Ziggy Shnurr	Episode: "Did You Hear the One About Danny Partridge?"
1971	Adam-12	Jerry Mermaid	Episode: "Log 106: Post Time"
1973	Honeymoon Suite	Bellboy	Unknown episode
1976	Rudolph's Shiny New Year	One Million (O.M) (voice)	Television film
1977	Mixed Nuts	Moe	Television film
1977	Alice	Herman	Episode: "Alice by Moonlight"
1978	Vega$	Izzy	Episode: "Centerfold"
1978–1982	The Love Boat	Floyd Loomis, Moe Price	2 episodes
1979	Sooner or Later	Eddie Nova	Television film
1979	Project U.F.O.	Ollie Hayes	Episode: Sighting 4026: The Atlantic Queen Incident"
1980	The Littlest Hobo	Freddie Tewksbur	Episode: "Fast Freddie"
1983	Fantasy Island	Jake	Episode "King of Burlesque/Death Games"
1983	Believe You Can... And You Can!	J. Fauntenoy Chiffenrobe	Television film
1985	Hail to the Chief	Manny	1 episode
1985	Brothers	Mr. Bobo	Episode: "A Greasepaint Smile"
1986	Crazy Like a Fox	Mr. Margus	Episode: "A Fox at the Races"
1988	Side by Side	Moe	Television film
1990	The Young and the Restless	Morey	5 episodes
1993	1st & Ten	Joe	Episode: "If I Didn't Play Football"
1993	Herman's Head	Buddy	Episode: "When Hairy Met Hermy:
1995	Cybill	Man in Nursing Home	Episode: "See Jeff Jump, Jump, Jeff, Jump!"
1996	Caroline in the City	Vic Stansky	Episode: "Caroline and the Watch"

== Production credits ==
=== Writer ===
- Hollywood Hobbies (1939)
- Kid Dynamite (1943) (additional dialogue)
- The Ghost and the Guest (1943) (screenplay)
- Bowery Champs (1944) (additional dialogue)
- The Morey Amsterdam Show (1948–1950) (3 episodes)
- Columbia Animal Cavalcade 1: Chimp-Antics (1952) (narrative)
- Don't Worry, We'll Think of a Title (1966) (screenplay)

=== Producer ===
- The Morey Amsterdam Show (1949–1950) (two episodes)
- Don't Worry, We'll Think of a Title (1966)
- Black, Kloke & Dagga (1967) (uncredited)
- Can You Top This (1970–1971) (46 episodes)
