= Ray Henderson =

American songwriter (1896–1970)

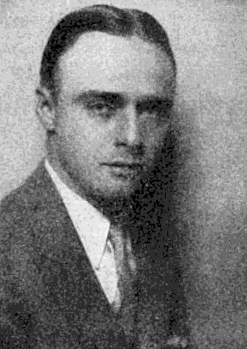
- In the Music Trade Indicator, February 4, 1928

Background information
- Born: Raymond Brost; December 1, 1896; Buffalo, New York, U.S.
- Died: December 31, 1970 (aged 74) Greenwich, Connecticut, U.S.
- Genres: Popular music
- Occupation: Songwriter

Ray Henderson (born Raymond Brost; December 1, 1896 – December 31, 1970) was an American songwriter.

== Early life ==
Born in Buffalo, New York, Henderson moved to New York City and became a popular composer in Tin Pan Alley. He was one-third of a successful songwriting and music publishing team with Lew Brown and Buddy De Sylva from 1925 through 1930, responsible for several editions of the revue called George White's Scandals and such book musicals as Good News, Hold Everything!, and Follow Thru. After De Sylva's departure, Henderson continued to write with Brown through 1933.

Then, he worked with other partners. In 1934, he composed the musical Say When with lyricist Ted Koehler.

== Career ==
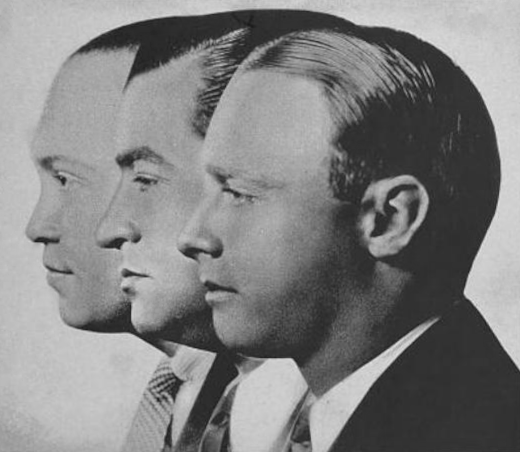
Henderson (right) with Buddy DeSylva and Lew Brown

Henderson's biggest hit songs included "Annabelle" (1923), "Alabamy Bound" (1924), "Bye Bye Blackbird", "Has Anybody Seen My Girl?" (a/k/a "Five Foot Two, Eyes of Blue"), "I'm Sitting on Top of the World", "Don't Bring Lulu" (all 1925), "The Birth of the Blues", "It All Depends on You" (both 1926), "The Varsity Drag", "The Best Things in Life Are Free" (both 1927), "You're the Cream in My Coffee", "Button Up Your Overcoat", "Sonny Boy" (all 1928), "You Are My Lucky Star", "I'm a Dreamer, Aren't We All", "(Keep Your) Sunny Side Up" (all 1929), "The Thrill Is Gone", "Life Is Just a Bowl of Cherries" (both 1931), and "Animal Crackers in My Soup" (1935).

Henderson also worked as an accompanist to song and dance acts in Vaudeville. His last Broadway show was a resuscitation of the Ziegfeld Follies, one of several put on after Ziegfeld's death. Henderson's, in 1943, had the longest run of any Follies at 553 performances. He effectively retired from composing in the late 1940s, and worked on an opera which was never completed.

== Death ==
Henderson died of a heart attack in Greenwich, Connecticut on December 31, 1970, at the age of 74.

== In popular culture ==
Good News has been adapted for film twice; in 1930 and in 1947.

The 1956 film The Best Things in Life Are Free was a dramatization of the songwriting team of Henderson, Brown and De Sylva; Henderson was played by Dan Dailey. The film included many of the trio's songs.

In 2000, a revue of Henderson's music called It's the Cherries opened in New York City as the inaugural show of the American Composer Series.
