= James Mollison (general) =

United States Air Force general

James Alexander Mollison (1897–1970) was a brigadier general of the United States Air Force during and immediately after World War II. Mollison was chief of staff of the Hawaiian Air Force, Hickam Field, Hawaii (serving under the overall command of Lt. Gen. Walter C. Short) at the time of the Japanese attack on Pearl Harbor on December 7, 1941. He became chief of staff of the Seventh Air Force in 1942.

In October 1944, Mollison was sent to Europe and served as commanding general of Fifteenth Air Force, Bari, Italy, and commanding general of the Mediterranean Allied Air Forces (MAAF) from August 1945.

He was awarded the Army Distinguished Service Medal for "exceptionally meritorious and distinguished services to the Government of the United States, in a duty of great responsibility" on August 28, 1945.
