= Billy Kelsey =

American baseball player (1881–1968)

- Catcher
- Born: August 24, 1881; Covington, Ohio, U.S.
- Died: April 24, 1968 (aged 86); Springfield, Ohio, U.S.
- Batted: Right Threw: Right

MLB debut
- October 4, 1907, for the Pittsburgh Pirates

Last MLB appearance
- October 6, 1907, for the Pittsburgh Pirates

MLB statistics
- Batting average: .400
- Home runs: 0
- Run batted in: 0
- Stats at Baseball Reference

Teams
- Pittsburgh Pirates (1907)

George William Kelsey (August 24, 1881 – April 24, 1968) was an American professional baseball player for the 1907 Pittsburgh Pirates. He later was a manager in the Texas League in 1909 and the Western Association in 1915.
