= Western International League =

Former minor league baseball circuit

- Classification: Class B (1922, 1937–1942; 1946–1951); Class A (1952–1954)
- Sport: Minor League Baseball
- First season: 1922, 1937
- Folded: 1954
- Replaced by: Northwest League
- President: Roger Peck (1937); F.H. Knickerbocker (1938–1939); Stanley A. Webster (1940); Robert Abel (1941–1954)
- No. of teams: 13
- Country: Canada; United States
- Most titles: Spokane Indians (4); Vancouver Capilanos (4)
- Related competitions: Western Canada League; Pacific Coast International League; Northwest League

The Western International League was a mid- to higher-level minor league baseball circuit in the Pacific Northwest United States and western Canada that operated in 1922, 1937 to 1942, and 1946 to 1954. In 1955, the Western International League evolved to become the Northwest League, which is still playing today.

== History ==
Informally known as the "Willy" loop, The Western International League operated in 1922, 1937 to 1942, and 1946 to 1954. In 1955, the league changed its name to become the Northwest League, and operated through 2019 as a Class A-Short Season loop under that name. In the minor league reorganization of 2021, most Northwest League teams became members of the High-A West circuit, before resuming the former name in 2022

The WIL consisted of teams in the U.S. states of Oregon, Washington, and Idaho, and the Canadian provinces of British Columbia and Alberta. It was a Class B league through 1951 and was upgraded to Class A in 1952. In its final season in 1954, it started with ten teams in Calgary, Edmonton, Lewiston, Salem, Spokane, Kennewick–Richland–Pasco (playing as "Tri-City"), Vancouver, Victoria, Wenatchee, and Yakima. Three teams did not finish the season (Spokane, Victoria, Calgary). The final champion was the Vancouver Capilanos, who swept the Lewiston Broncs in four games. Vancouver was the first half champion while third-year Lewiston won the second half.

Throughout much of the 1930s and 1940s, its teams were largely unaffiliated with major league farm systems and provided talent to the strong Pacific Coast League of the era.

== Cities represented ==
- Bellingham, WA: Bellingham Chinooks 1938–1939
- Bremerton, WA: Bremerton Bluejackets 1946–1949
- Calgary, AB: Calgary Bronchos 1922; Calgary Stampeders 1953–1954
- Edmonton, AB: Edmonton Eskimos 1922, 1953–1954
- Kennewick, WA, Richland, WA & Pasco, WA: Tri-City Braves 1950–1954
- Lewiston, ID: Lewiston Broncs 1937, 1952–1954
- Salem, OR: Salem Senators 1940–1942, 1946–1954
- Spokane, WA: Spokane Hawks 1937–1939; Spokane Indians 1940–1942, 1946-1954
- Tacoma, WA: Tacoma Tigers 1922, 1937–1942, 1946–1951
- Vancouver, BC: Vancouver Beavers 1922; Vancouver Maple Leafs 1937–1938; Vancouver Capilanos 1939–1942, 1946–1954
- Victoria, BC: Victoria Athletics 1946–1951; Victoria Tyees 1952–1954
- Wenatchee, WA: Wenatchee Chiefs 1937–1941, 1946–1954
- Yakima, WA: Yakima Pippins 1937–1941; Yakima Stars 1946–1947; Yakima Packers 1948; Yakima Bears 1949–1954

== League champions ==
- 1923 Calgary Bronchos
- 1937 Tacoma Tigers
- 1938 Bellingham Chinooks
- 1939 Tacoma Tigers
- 1940 Tacoma Tigers
- 1941 Spokane Indians
- 1942 Vancouver Capilanos
- 1946 Wenatchee Chiefs
- 1947 Vancouver Capilanos
- 1948 Spokane Indians
- 1949 Vancouver Capilanos
- 1950 Yakima Bears
- 1951 Spokane Indians
- 1952 Victoria Tyees
- 1953 Spokane Indians
- 1954 Vancouver Capilanos

== Sources ==
- Johnson, Lloyd; Wolff, Miles, eds. (1997). The Encyclopedia of Minor League Baseball (2nd ed.). Durham, North Carolina: Baseball America. ISBN 978-0-9637189-8-3.
