= Lists of mascots =

This is a list of mascots. A mascot is any person, animal, or object thought to bring luck, or anything used to represent a group with a common public identity, such as a school, professional sports team, society, military unit, or brand name.

== General ==
- List of college mascots in the United States
- List of computing mascots
- Lists of advertising characters
- List of breakfast cereal advertising characters
- List of video game mascots

== Sports ==
- List of Olympic mascots
- List of Paralympic mascots
- List of FIFA World Cup official mascots
- List of UEFA European Championship official mascots
- List of Major League Baseball mascots
- List of NBA mascots
- List of NFL mascots
- List of NHL mascots
- List of WNBA Mascots
- List of association football mascots
- List of Australian sporting mascots
- List of Commonwealth Games mascots

== Other ==
- Boognish - mascot for the American rock band Ween
- Dillon T. Pickle - mascot for the Portland Pickles baseball team
- Freedom Frog - mascot of Intervention Helpline, an Alaska counseling nonprofit organization
- Senhor Testiculo - Brazilian mascot of the Associação de Assistência às Pessoas
- Zé Gotinha - Brazilian mascot created to promote vaccination campaigns against the polio virus

== See also ==
- List of national animals
- Mascot Hall of Fame
- Military mascot
- Wikipedia and mascots
