= Portland Bangers FC =

Portland Bangers
- Full name: Portland Bangers Football Club
- Founded: January 21, 2025; 21 months ago
- Stadium: Lents Park; Portland, Oregon, U.S.
- Owner: Collide Sport
- Head coach: Eric McClellan
- League: USL League Two
- 2025: 4th of Northwest Division (no playoffs)
- Website: portlandbangers.com
Home colors	Away colors

Portland Bangers Football Club is an American soccer club based in Portland, Oregon. They were founded in 2025 and field a semi-professional men's team in the Northwest Division of USL League Two. The team's ownership group Collide Sport also owns the women's team Portland Cherry Bombs FC, as well as the Portland Pickles, a local summer baseball team. The team is named after the British nickname for sausages.

== History ==
On January 21, 2025, the owners of the Portland Pickles baseball team announced that they would form a new soccer team that would play in USL League Two's Northwest Division. It was one of 20 expansion teams planned for the 2025 season and would join three other teams in Oregon. Former Portland Timbers player Jorge Villafaña was named as head coach. The team would use college players in a manner similar to the Pickles, who run during the summer offseason.

The team's name, Portland Bangers FC, and crest were announced on February 5, 2025. The "bangers" name refers to both the British nickname for sausages as well as a term in soccer for a long-distance goal. Former Timbers captain Diego Valeri was also announced as assistant coach and team advisor. The Bangers play at Hilken Community Stadium in the Concordia neighborhood, with capacity expected to be lower than Walker Stadium, a 1,566-spectator ballpark used by the Pickles. The team announced plans to have several theme nights similar to the Pickles.

The crest is a green roundel with a white shield that is inspired by the arches of St. Johns Bridge that features the team's mascot, Saucy T. Sausage, a pink sausage. The logo features Saucy T. Sausage kicking a soccer ball with a pattern of stars similar to the city flag through the team's wordmark, rendered in a comic book-like font to reference Portland's indie comics industry.

Eric McClellan was named head coach on November 4, 2026.

=== Mascot ===
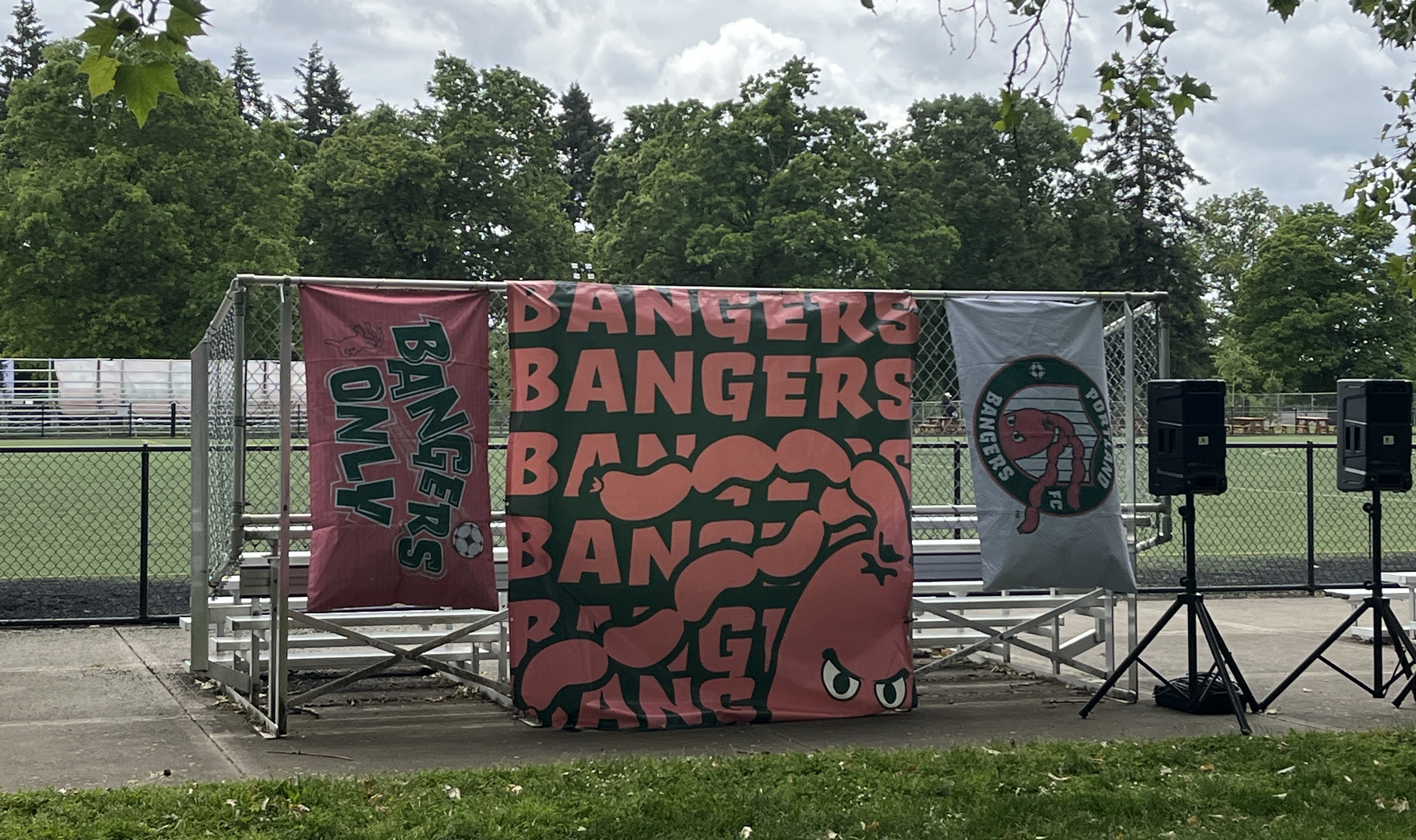
Portland Bangers FC banners at Walker Stadium, Lents Park, 2026

The team's mascot, a large sausage named Saucy T. Sausage, was unveiled in May 2025. According to his origin story, he was created by Portland Pickles mascot Dillon T. Pickle as a science experiment and was dipped in "some sort of radioactive fluid". In a segment on The Late Show, comedian Stephen Colbert called Saucy T. Sausage "horrifying" and compared him to a "porno version of the Grinch".

== Staff ==
Coaching staff
Head coach	Jorge Villafaña
Assistant coach	Diego Valeri
Technical director	Luke Babson
Goalkeeper coach	Austin Rogers

Last updated: February 2025
Source: Portland Bangers FC

== See also ==
- Portland Cherry Bombs FC
