= Portland Gherkins =

Collegiate woodbat baseball team

- Logo

Information
- League: Wild Wild West League (2020–present)
- Location: Portland, Oregon
- Ballpark: Charles B. Walker Stadium at Lents Park
- Founded: 2019
- Nickname: Gherks
- League championships: 1 (2022)
- Division championships: 0
- Colors: Blue, Sky Blue, Green and White
- Mascot: Lil' P
- Ownership: Rose City Baseball, LLC; Portland Pickles
- General manager: Ross Campbell
- Website: www.wwwestleague.com/portland-gherkins

The Portland Gherkins are a collegiate woodbat baseball team based in Portland, Oregon. They are charter members of the Wild Wild West League, a short-season developmental collegiate summer baseball league owned by Rose City Baseball, LLC, and operated by the Portland Pickles baseball club of the West Coast League. They play their home games at Walker Stadium in Portland's Lents Park and are the Pickles' farm club.

== History ==
The Gherkins were founded in 2019 by Rose City Baseball, LLC, as a farm team for the Portland Pickles baseball club of the West Coast League. The original plans were to have the Gherkins play an independent schedule as a way to enhance talent to play in the WCL. However, on June 5, 2020, the WCL's board of directors voted to cancel their 2020 season due to COVID-19 pandemic. As a result, the Pickles organization founded the Wild Wild West League in response to the WCL season cancellation, playing in Bob Brack Stadium at North Marion High School in Aurora, Oregon.

As previously planned, the team plays fellow teams in the WCL, including the Pickles, with Gherkin players given the opportunity to move up to the Pickles roster based on ability.

=== Wild Wild West League (2020–present) ===
==== 2020: "The Pandemic Season" ====
The Wild Wild West League consisted of four teams: the Pickles, Gherkins, Gresham GreyWolves, and West Linn Knights. Games ran in a short-season format from July 11 to August 7 with playoffs on August 8 and a final championship game on August 9, which was won by the Knights after eliminating the Gherkins in the semi-finals.

==== 2021: New Home, New Direction ====
In the summer of 2021, the Gherkins and the WWWL were such a hit that the league and all teams relocated to Walker Stadium in east Portland, the Pickles' home field, to start their second season. The Gherkins were eliminated from the championship game a second time, this time by the expansion Willamette Wild Bills.

==== 2022: First Championship ====
After failing to make the title game the first two years, the Gherkins finally won the 2022 Wild Wild West League Championship defeating the Gresham GreyWolves 9-7. Kane Kiaunis was named the game's most valuable player. They are the second Portland team to win a championship with the Portland Rosebuds winning the previous season.

As of 2024, the Gherkins and the WWWL went dormant.

== Sponsorship ==
Largely made up of local players, the Gherkins have partnered with the Milwaukie, Oregon-based company Dave's Killer Bread for the latter to act as the official broadcast partner. In 2022, they partnered with Portland-based Pickle Finance as a team sponsor.

== Broadcast ==
Gherkins games are broadcast on the Portland Pickles' Facebook Live and YouTube channels with play-by-play announcers changing year to year. The initial Wild Wild West League announcer was Mike Chexx for the 2021 season, but moved up to the Pickles announcer's booth in 2022.

== Results by season ==
Year	League	Won	Lost	Regular Season Finish	Postseason	Manager
2020	Wild Wild West League	N/A	N/A	4th in League	Lost semi-finals (West Linn)	N/A
2021	Wild Wild West League	N/A	N/A	3rd in League	Lost semi-finals (Gresham)	N/A
2022	Wild Wild West League	11	1	1st in League	Won Championship (Gresham)	Gerhett Moser
