= Portland Coffee Roasters =

Coffee company based in Portland, Oregon, U.S.

Logo

Portland Coffee Roasters (PCR), formerly Portland Roasting Coffee Company, is a coffee company based in Portland, Oregon, United States. Mark Stell founded the business and remains a co-owner.

Established in 1996, PCR is among Portland's oldest coffee companies. The business has operated a cafe in southeast Portland and at Portland International Airport. PCR has been described as "progressive" and focuses on sustainability.

PCR partnered with basketball player Jusuf Nurkić to launch a brew called "Bosnian Beans". In 2024, the business partnered with the Portland Pickles to launch the "Dillon T. Pickle Blend", named after the team's mascot Dillon T. Pickle.
