= Portland Rose (disambiguation) =

A Portland Rose is a type of garden rose.

Portland Rose or Portland Roses may also refer to:

- Portland Rose (train), a discontinued named passenger train in the united States
- Portland Rose Festival, an annual festival Portland, Oregon
- Portland Rosebuds (disambiguation), professional men's sports teams in Portland, Oregon

== See also ==
- Portland Rose Garden (disambiguation)
