= Gresham GreyWolves =

Collegiate woodbat baseball team

- Logo

Information
- League: Wild Wild West League (2020–present)
- Location: Gresham, Oregon
- Ballpark: Walker Stadium, Portland, Oregon
- Founded: 2015
- Nickname: G-Wolves
- Former league: West Coast League (2016–2017)
- Colors: Gold, Grey and Black
- Ownership: Rose City Baseball, LLC
- Website: www.wwwestleague.com/gresham-greywolves

The Gresham GreyWolves are a collegiate woodbat baseball team located in Gresham, Oregon. The GreyWolves play at Oslund Field on the campus of Mount Hood Community College and were a member of the West Coast League (WCL), a collegiate summer baseball league, in their first two seasons in 2016 and 2017. However, the GreyWolves became an independent team in 2018 when the club was purchased by Rose City Baseball, LLC and replaced in the WCL by the Portland Pickles. The GreyWolves now play in the short-season Wild Wild West League.

Gresham played its inaugural season in 2016 as an expansion team. On December 4, 2015, the team announced it would be called the GreyWolves after a public naming contest was held that received more than 1,000 submissions.

== History ==
=== Inception ===
GreyWolves' original logo from their WCL days. (2015-2017)

Owners Jerry and Lisa Walker announced on October 22, 2015, that they were bringing a new West Coast League team to Gresham. The announcement was made at Oslund Field at Mount Hood Community College, where the then-unnamed team would play.

On December 4, 2015, the new franchise held a naming announcement at the Gresham City Hall. The team officially announced its name, unveiled its branding and logos, and put eight different hats on display.

On November 9, 2015, before the GreyWolves were named, Justin Barchus was announced as the first manager in franchise history. Barchus was previously the manager of the Klamath Falls Gems.

=== West Coast League (2016–2017) ===
The Grey Wolves played for two seasons in the West Coast League. They compiled a record of 46-61 in those two seasons and finished no better than third place.

=== Independent (2018-2019) ===
The GreyWolves played an independent schedule in 2018 and sat out in 2019.

=== Wild Wild West League (2020–present) ===
==== 2020 ====
On June 5, 2020 in response to the West Coast League board of directors vote to cancel the 2020 season, The Portland Pickles organization founded the Wild Wild West League, playing in Bob Brack Stadium in Aurora, Oregon. Without a league for two seasons prior, the GreyWolves were invited to take part in the inaugural season. The league consisted of four teams the Portland Pickles, Gresham Greywolves, West Linn Knights and Portland Gherkins. Games ran from July 11 to August 7 with playoffs on August 8 and a final championship game on August 9. The GreyWolves finished the COVID-19 shortened season with a record of 4–9.

==== 2021 ====
On January 25, 2021, the Portland Pickles announced the Wild Wild West League would return in 2021 with the GreyWolves included as one of four teams. The GreyWolves will be taking part in the 2021 season with the Portland Gherkins and two new teams, the Portland Rosebuds and the Willamette Wild Bills. All games in the 2021 season will be played at the Charles B. Walker Stadium at Lents Park.

==== 2022 ====
The GreyWolves returned for a third season in the WWWL. They made it to the 2022 WWWL Championship Game only to lose to the Portland Gherkins 8-7.

As of 2024, the GreyWolves and the WWWL went dormant.

== Team Ownership ==
Jerry and Lisa Walker, who also own the Salem-Keizer Volcanoes of the Minor League Baseball Short Season 'A' Northwest League previously owned the GreyWolves. The team was owned for one season in 2017 by Scott Barchus before Barchus sold the team to Rose City Baseball, LLC and joined its ownership.

== Results by season ==
Year	League	Won	Lost	Regular Season Finish	Postseason	Manager
2016	West Coast League	26	28	3rd South Division		Justin Barchus
2017	West Coast League	20	33	5th South Division		Justin Barchus
2020	Wild Wild West League	4	9	3rd in League	Lost semi-finals (Portland Pickles)	Jim Hoppel
2021	Wild Wild West League	N/A	N/A	4th in League	Lost semi-finals (Portland Rosebuds)	Jim Hoppel
2022	Wild Wild West League	8	6	2nd in League	Lost championship (Portland Gherkins)	Jim Hoppel
