= Portland Cherry Bombs FC =

Women's soccer club based in Portland, Oregon

- Founded: 2025
- Ground: Lents Park; Portland, Oregon
- Owner: COLLiDE Sport
- League: USL W League
- Website: cherrybombsfc.com

Portland Cherry Bombs FC is a pre-professional women's soccer team based in Portland, Oregon, United States. The team plays in the USL W League and was announced in 2025 by their ownership group COLLiDE Sport, which also owns the men's team Portland Bangers FC and the Portland Pickles baseball team.

The team began league play on 21 May 2026 against the West Seattle Rhodies.

== Name and mascot ==
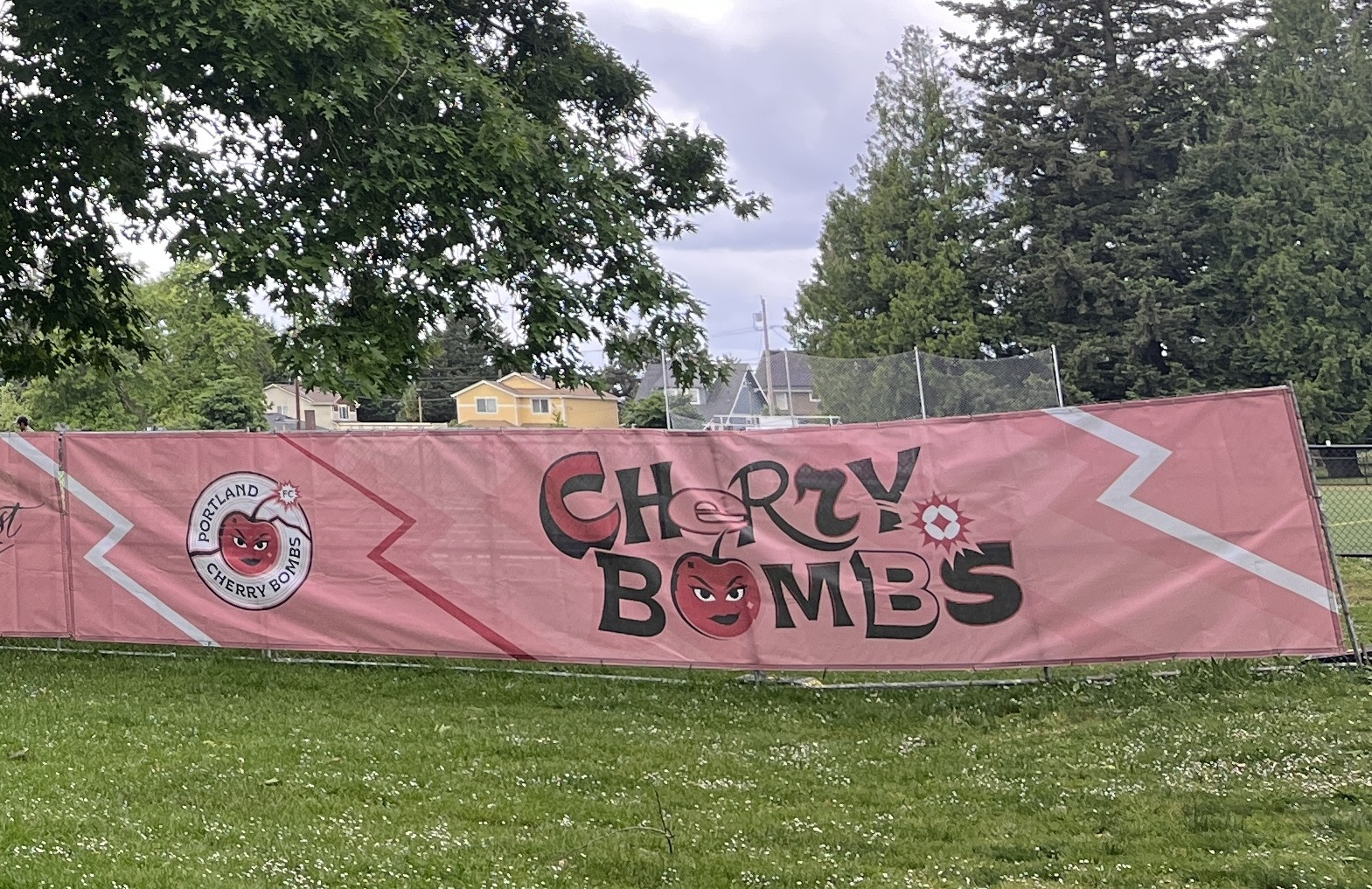
Team banner at Walker Stadium, Lents Park, 2026

The team's name comes from The Runaways’ 1976 punk rock song, "Cherry Bomb". The team's mascot is Mary T. Cherry.

The club featured Planned Parenthood as the main sponsor of their inaugural jersey.

== See also ==
- Portland Bangers FC
- List of United Soccer League clubs
- Women's sports in Portland, Oregon
