= Wellbee =

1960s American public health mascot

- Drawing of Wellbee from a 1963 poster
- Agency: Centers for Disease Control and Prevention
- Market: Unvaccinated Americans
- Language: English
- Product: Cartoon character
- Release date: 1962
- Produced by: Harold M. Walker
- Country: United States

Wellbee was an American cartoon character and public health mascot that first appeared in 1962. He was an anthropomorphic bumblebee created by Hollywood artist Harold M. Walker at the request of Centers for Disease Control and Prevention's (CDC) public information officer George M. Stenhouse. The character became CDC's national symbol of public health at the time, and was widely used to promote immunization and other public health campaigns in the United States following the Vaccination Assistance Act of 1962.

== Origin ==
Wellbee, a standing cartoon character bumblebee with a smiling round face representing "well-being", was created by the Hollywood artist Harold M. Walker, at the request of CDC's public information officer George M. Stenhouse. Referred to by the CDC as "he", Wellbee was first revealed in The Atlanta Journal-Constitution newspaper on March 11, 1962, following a press release that described the character as "a pleasant-faced, bright–eyed, happy cartoon character, who is the personification of good health."

The purpose of the character was the promotion of preventive health measures and the importance of vaccination. At the time, the US government had substantially increased funding and new programs in public health, and with the support of the Vaccination Assistance Act of 1962, sponsored the CDC in its educational efforts, the symbol of which became Wellbee.

== Campaigns ==
The marketing campaign by the CDC planned appearances of Wellbee at public health events and in leaflets, newspapers and posters, and on radio and television, beginning with promoting Sabin's oral polio vaccine in Atlanta and across the United States. Local health departments used the character Wellbee. In Atlanta and Tampa, a smiling Wellbee appeared on posters encouraging children to "drink the free polio vaccine", stating it "tastes good, works fast, prevents polio". In Chicago, its image appeared on pin-back buttons and billboards. A person dressed as Wellbee posed with baseball players Bill Monbouquette, Dick Radatz and Eddie Bressoud of the Boston Red Sox at Fenway Park. In Boston, Wellbee stood alongside mayor John F. Collins, who had been affected by polio.

The bee visited schools in Honolulu, appeared on a dog sled in Anchorage, and in Dallas it cautioned against being "Illbee". Subsequent immunization campaigns included promoting vaccines against diphtheria and tetanus, and the character was used to emphasize the benefits of hand-washing, exercise, oral health, and injury prevention, becoming familiar to children and the national symbol of public health. In 1964 posters encouraged the vaccinated to get boosted.

== Effect ==
Within a year, Stenhouse noted that "Wellbee, the 'health educator's friend', had a busy year. He was particularly active in promoting community polio programs. He spoke Spanish in New Mexico; he came to life in costume in Hawaii and led a parade."

As a result of the Vaccination Assistance Act, 50 million people were vaccinated against polio between 1962 and 1964 and seven million children received the vaccine that prevents diphtheria, tetanus and whooping cough, resulting in a fall in cases of polio and diphtheria. In 1965 the Vaccination Assistance Act was extended.

Several vaccine mascots have been created since Wellbee. According to the director of the Vaccine Confidence Project at the London School of Hygiene & Tropical Medicine, Heidi Larson, vaccine mascots are "humorous, playful", and it "makes it seem less clinical, less government-driven, less 'You have to take this'", thereby engaging young and older groups.

== Gallery ==
Public health posters featuring Wellbee:

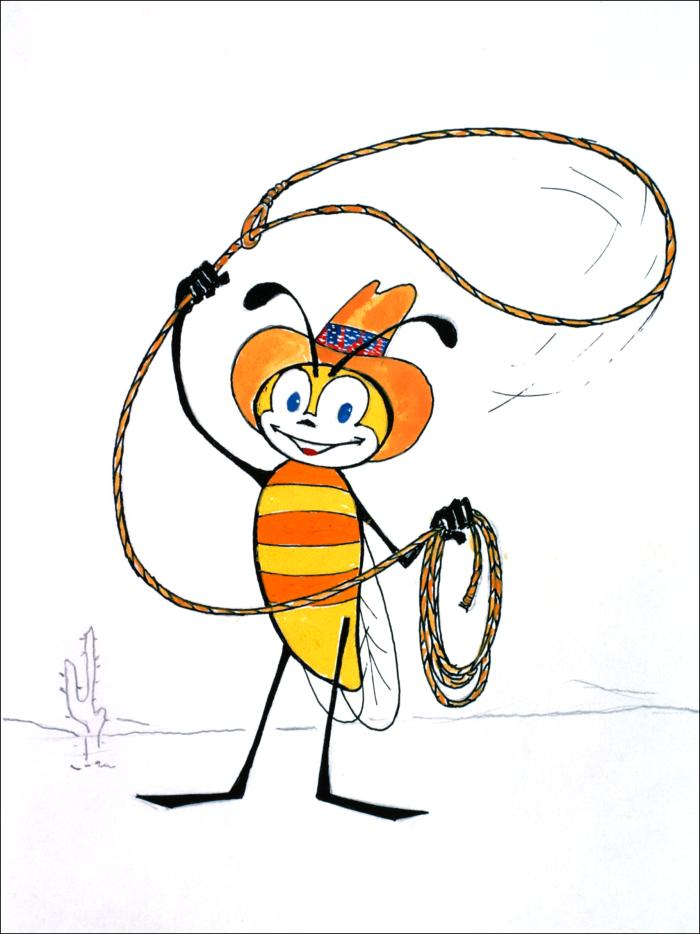
1962

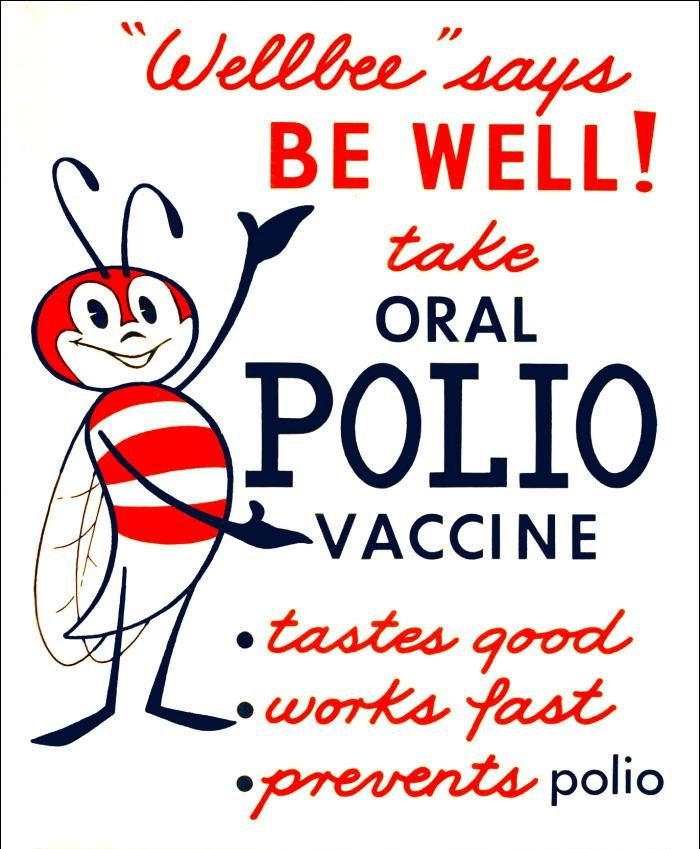
1963

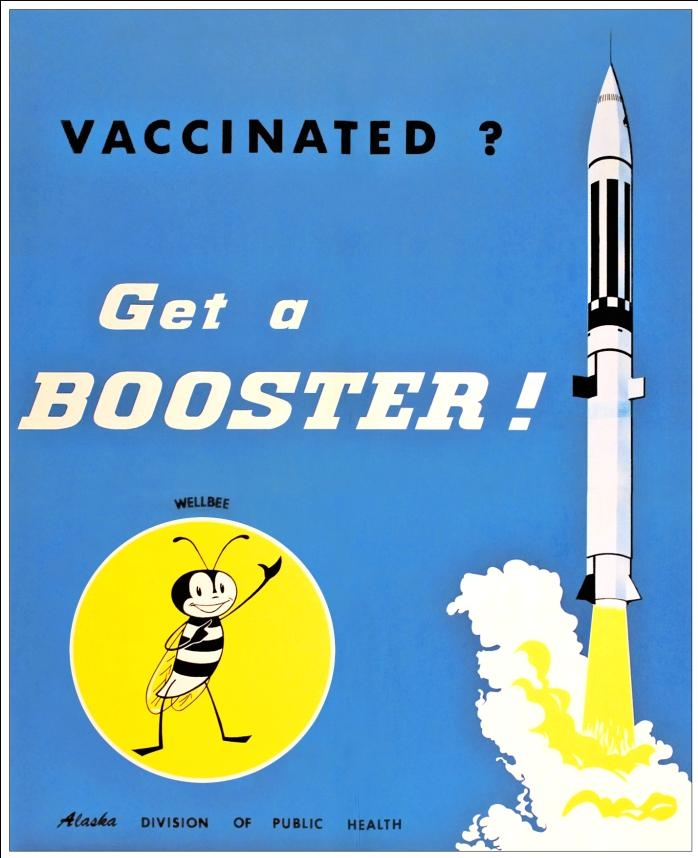
1964

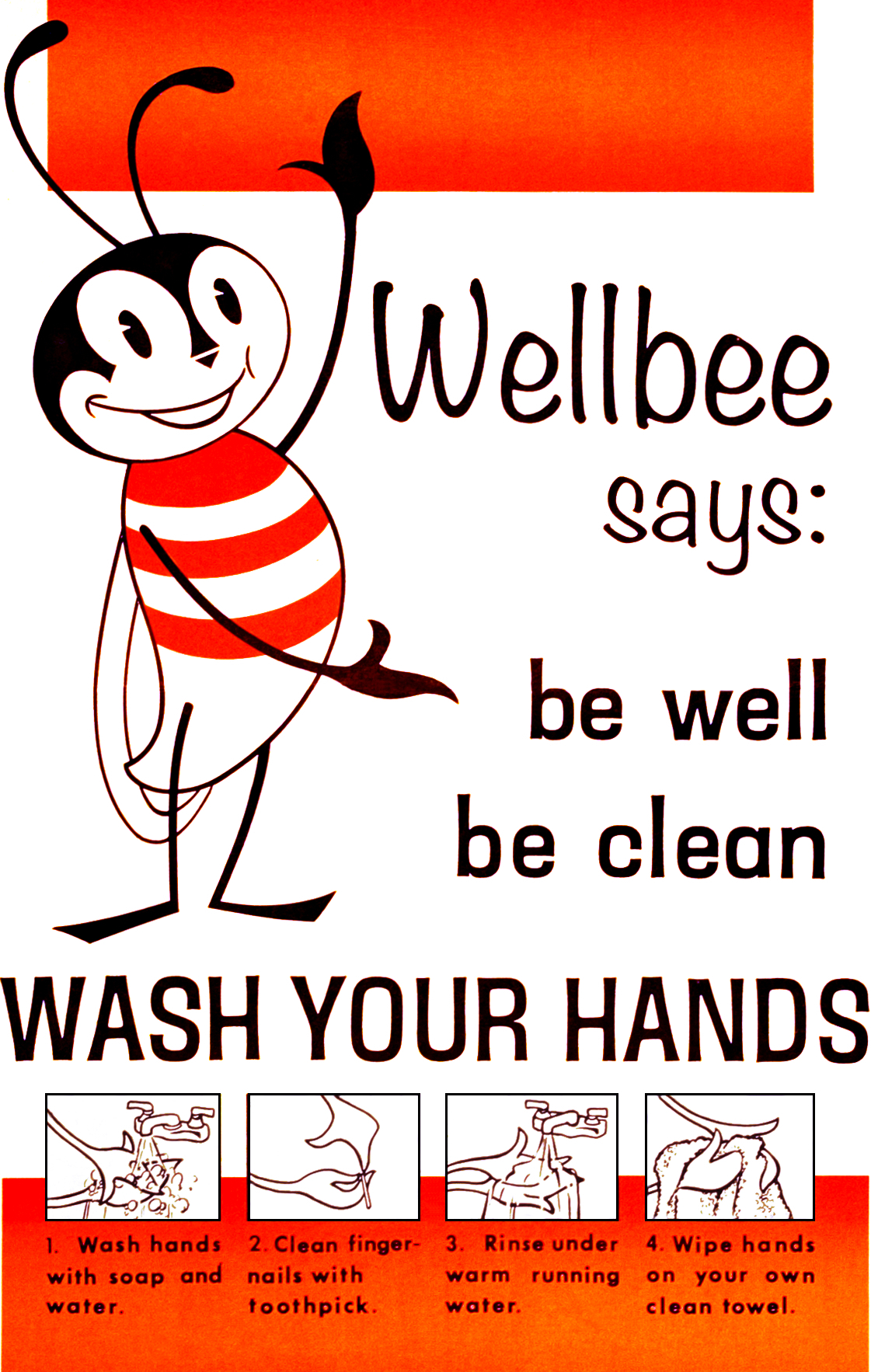
1964

== See also ==
- Zé Gotinha
