= Wild Wild West League =

Collegiate summer baseball team

- Sport: Baseball
- Founded: 2020
- Owners: Rose City Baseball, LLC; Portland Pickles
- Commissioner: Rob Neyer
- No. of teams: 4 (as of 2023)
- Countries: United States
- Most recent champion: Willamette Wild Bills
- Official website: www.wwwestleague.com

The Wild Wild West League is a collegiate summer league based out of Portland, Oregon. It serves as a developmental minor league and is owned and operated by the Portland Pickles collegiate baseball club of the West Coast League. The league features four teams and all games are played at Charles B. Walker Stadium at Lents Park in southeast Portland, home of the Pickles.

== History ==
League's original logo from their inaugural season in 2020.

=== 2020: Inaugural season ===
The league was formed by the Portland Pickles in 2020 following the cancellation of the West Coast League's regular season due to the COVID-19 pandemic. Months prior, the Pickles also founded a developmental farm club of their own known as the Portland Gherkins. The Pickles and Gherkins were joined by the previously independent Gresham GreyWolves and West Linn Knights and played the inaugural two-week season at Bob Brack Stadium in Aurora, Oregon, with all players, coaches and staffs having to follow the COVID-19 guidelines at the local, state and federal levels and limited fans in attendance. The league even grabbed the attention nationally of Forbes magazine. Play officially began on July 11, 2020, with the Pickles playing the Gherkins.

On July 15, 2020, the league suspended play for at least seven days following positive COVID-19 tests from two players, just four days after the inaugural season started. The league would resume play eight days later.

The Knights won the inaugural league championship, defeating the Pickles 8–7 in the championship game.

=== 2021 ===
The league was so successful that it announced a second season and that all of its games would be moved to Walker Stadium at Lents Park in southeast Portland, home of the Pickles, who returned to the WCL. The Knights were folded and both were replaced by the revived Portland Rosebuds (named for the former Negro league team from the 1940's) and Willamette Wild Bills.

The Rosebuds won the 2nd WWWL Championship defeating the Wild Bills 6–4 in the finals.

=== 2022 ===
The league announced expansion into Cleburne, Texas, with a newly-formed four-team Texas Division with all games being played at The Depot at Cleburne Station, also the home of the Cleburne Railroaders of the professional American Association. The four teams founded by the league included the Cleburne Eagles (named for the former Negro league team from the 1930's to 1960's), Joshua Trees, Burleson Boxers and Fort Worth Rodeo Cats.

However, the teams never played due to lack of interest. Therefore, the Texas Division teams and plans were scrapped by the league.

The Oregon teams all returned for a third season and became known as the Portland Division with all games once again being played at Walker Stadium. The Portland Gherkins won the 2022 WWWL Championship defeating the Gresham GreyWolves 9–7 in the championship game.

=== 2023 ===
On April 13, 2023, the league announced that they would play a fourth season. On August 26, the Willamette Wild Bills won their first WWWL Championship by beating the defending champion Gherkins 9-8 to capture the title. In 2024, the WWWL went dormant.

=== 2025 ===
After taking a season off, the WWWL returned to action with all of its teams playing the Pickles in pre-season non-league action.

== Special rules ==
=== PickleBot 3000 ===
One of the main attractions to the league is an automated strike zone, dubbed Picklebot 3000. Because of the Picklebot, only one field umpire is used for each game. It was introduced in 2021 and has been used ever since.

The Wheel of Brine

In certain games, the Wheel of Brine is spun to change the conditions of the game. An inning could have four outs, two outfielders, or every count could start 2-1.

== Current teams ==
| Team | City | First season |
|---|---|---|
| Gresham GreyWolves | Gresham, OR | 2020 |
| Portland Gherkins | Portland, OR | 2020 |
| Portland Rosebuds | Portland, OR | 2021 |
| Willamette Wild Bills | Portland, OR | 2021 |

== Former teams ==
| Team | City | First season | Last season | Result |
|---|---|---|---|---|
| Burleson Boxers | Burleson, TX | 2022 | 2022 | Never Played |
| Cleburne Eagles | Cleburne, TX | 2022 | 2022 | Never Played |
| Fort Worth Rodeo Cats | Fort Worth, TX | 2022 | 2022 | Never Played |
| Joshua Trees | Joshua, TX | 2022 | 2022 | Never Played |
| Portland Pickles | Portland, OR | 2020 | 2020 | Returned to WCL full-time |
| West Linn Knights | Portland, OR | 2020 | 2020 | Folded |

== Champions ==
- 2020: West Linn Knights
- 2021: Portland Rosebuds
- 2022: Portland Gherkins
- 2023: Willamette Wild Bills

== Broadcasting ==
The league broadcasts all games on Facebook Live and YouTube channels using the Portland Pickles' Broadcast Crew. Carlo Jimenez was the initial play-by-play voice in 2020, followed by Mike Chexx in 2021.
