= Wikipedia mascots =

Unofficial mascots, from left to right: the Miwiki Ant, the Wikipede, Wikipe-tan, Baby Globe, and Puzzly

There is no official mascot to represent Wikipedia as a whole. Multiple characters have been designed and used unofficially by community members as mascots for the project since the site's early history. However, some of them have also been referenced or used temporarily by the Wikimedia Foundation, such as the Baby Globe mascot used in Wikipedia's 25th anniversary. In late September of 2026, the three most popular unofficial mascots were the subject of an art trend on X in which they were portrayed as a trio.

== Baby Globe ==
Promotional art drawn by Sharon Park depicting Baby Globe holding number balloons and wearing a party hat

Baby Globe is the mascot of Wikipedia's 25th anniversary. The character was originally a personal sketch drawn by Wikipedia editor Jonathan Ferreira during his daily BART commutes around the San Francisco Bay Area. He later shared his drawings with the Wikipedia community, initially referring to the character as "the little mascot". The mascot's design consists of the Wikipedia logo with a face, light blue limbs, and in a style inspired by 1920s rubber hose animation.

Baby Globe was officially introduced on January 15 as a brief cameo on the homepage of the site. This appearance was a teaser for a limited time "Birthday Mode", which was released on February 16th. When the mode was enabled, animated GIFs of the character would appear on a small selection of articles. According to Wikimedia representative Chris Koerner, there are plans to use Baby Globe worldwide at anniversary events and within community projects. He also announced a partnership with Makeship to make a limited edition plush toy of the character. On May 11th, Wikipedia released a limited-time "Reading Challenge" on the site's app, which shows GIFs of Baby Globe on the progress screen and widget.

== Wikipe-tan ==
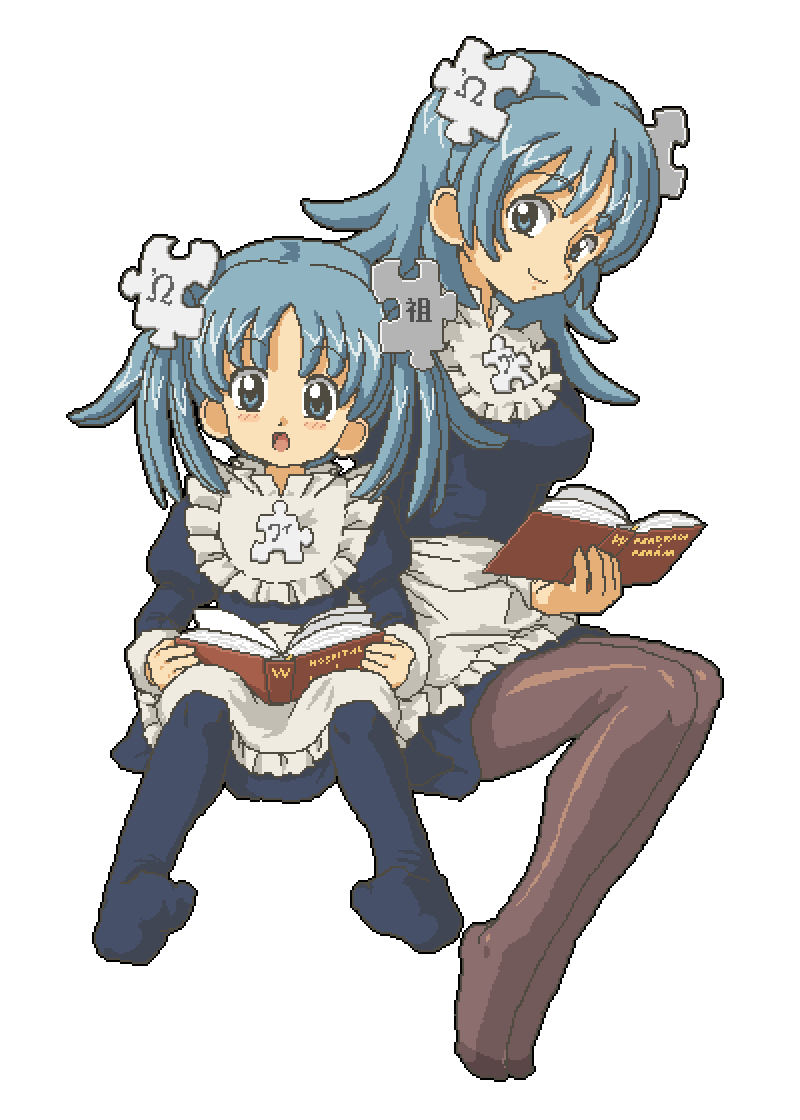
The normal and adult designs of Wikipe-tan by Kasuga

Wikipe-tan is a fan-made moe anthropomorphization or gijinka of Wikipedia, taking inspiration from OS-tans. The idea of a moe mascot for Wikipedia was suggested in 2006 by an anonymous requester, and the visual design was then developed by Japanese Wikipedian, translator and artist Kasuga who posted the initial sketches to Futaba Channel. Wikipe-tan is particularly used as the mascot of the English Wikipedia's Anime and Manga WikiProject. Fan art of Wikipe-tan has sometimes been used to illustrate different concepts in Wikipedia's articles. Wikipe-tan is commonly depicted in a dark blue hotel maid outfit and with teal twintails held by two puzzle piece-shaped hair ties. Other images may display different kinds of clothing or attributes symbolizing a particular role. She also has two sisters named Commons-tan and Quote-tan, who are anthropomorphizations of Wikimedia Commons and Wikiquote respectively.

While Wikipe-tan has been described as a cult-favorite, with some going as far as to cosplay her, some have criticized the "potential lack of objectivity and neutrality" in her usage. One piece of fan art posted to Wikimedia Commons in 2007 depicting the character in a lolicon manner was deleted by Wikipedia co-founder Jimmy Wales, who said, "Pedophilic sexualization of a community mascot? No. Email me if you have questions." Wales later revealed his personal dislike of Wikipe-tan in 2011, quoting: "My removal of the sexualized version from Commons was in no way an endorsement of the standard versions. I don't like Wikipe-tan and never have. I recognize that some people do, and I'm not particularly agitated about it, but my name should not be invoked in a way that might lead some to believe that I approve."

== Wikipede ==
The mascot design by Stevertigo

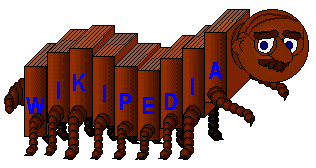
The logo design by Theresa Knott

The Wikipede, also known as Kip, is a character that was proposed to be Wikipedia's mascot prior to the idea of a logo. He is depicted as a green centipede with large, circular glasses, orange gloves, and three pairs of pink arms. He is described as a "shy book lover" that "avoids controversy and conflict" and lacks employment despite possessing multiple degrees.

A different design of the character was later proposed to be the sites's logo. He is depicted as a brown centipede made out of books, with a mustache, two strands of hair, and nine pairs of limbs. For April Fools' Day in 2026, the Wikimedia Instagram account jokingly said the character was going to become the new Wikipedia logo. Merchandise of the Wikipede was later introduced to the Wikipedia Store in May of that year.

== See also ==
- List of mascots
- List of computing mascots
