= Portland Rosebuds =

Portland Rosebuds may refer to:

- Portland Rosebuds (baseball), a Negro league baseball team in Portland, Oregon in 1946
- Portland Rosebuds (WWWL), a baseball team in the Wild Wild West League, collegiate summer baseball wooden bat league, started in 2021
- Portland Rosebuds (ice hockey), the name of two professional ice hockey teams in Portland, Oregon: one in 1914–1918 and one in 1925–1926
