= Harold M. Walker =

American animator (1904–1994)

- Born: 1904; Ossining, New York, US
- Died: 1994 (aged 89–90)
- Occupation: Animator
- Notable work: Wellbee

Harold M. Walker (1904–1994), was an American animator, who early in his career worked on Mutt and Jeff and Felix the Cat and then on Willard Bowsky's unit with Popeye. In 1962 he created Wellbee, a cartoon character that represented well-being and was used in public health campaigns in the United States.

== Biography ==
Harold Mitchell Walker was born in April 21st, 1904 in Ossining, New York, to George Walker. At the age of five, he was injured in a hit and run accident; the incident was reported in The New York Times.

One of the early members and a founder of the PRPS was Harold Mitchell Walker, who was born in Ossining, N.Y., in 1904. He was a silent screen actor, served in the Navy during WWI, and became a famous animator of Betty Boop, Felix the Cat, Mutt & Jeff, and Popeye. A life long boating enthusiast and USPS member, Mr. Walker helped found and organize many Southeastern US Power Squadrons. He moved to Charlotte County from Atlanta, Georgia, in 1972, and continued his work with the USPS. He taught all courses and promoted the Officer's Training Program which he chaired for many years. At the D/22 Spring Conference, he received his 50" year membership plaque and was awarded his 50" merit mark at the 1993 Annual USPS Meeting where he was named “man for all seasons.” Harold Walker died in 1994.

Early in his career he worked on Mutt and Jeff and Felix the Cat and then on Willard Bowsky's unit with Beware of Barnacle Bill and then Popeye. After the release of Walt Disney's sound synchronized Steamboat Willie in 1928, Walker noted "Disney put us out of business with his sound".

In 1962 he created Wellbee, a cartoon character that represented well-being and was used in public health campaigns in the United States.

== Gallery ==
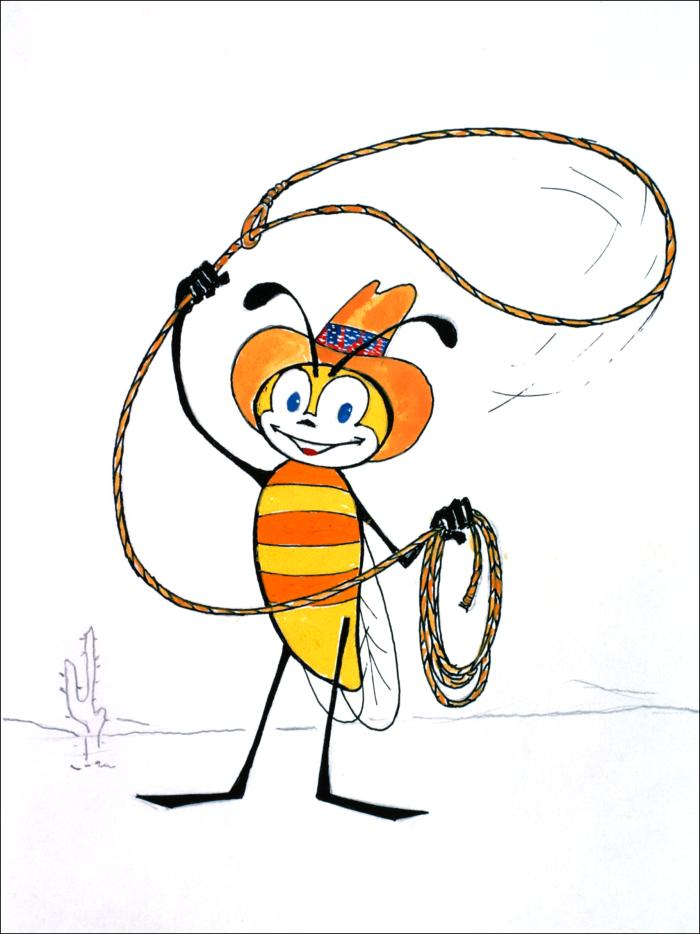

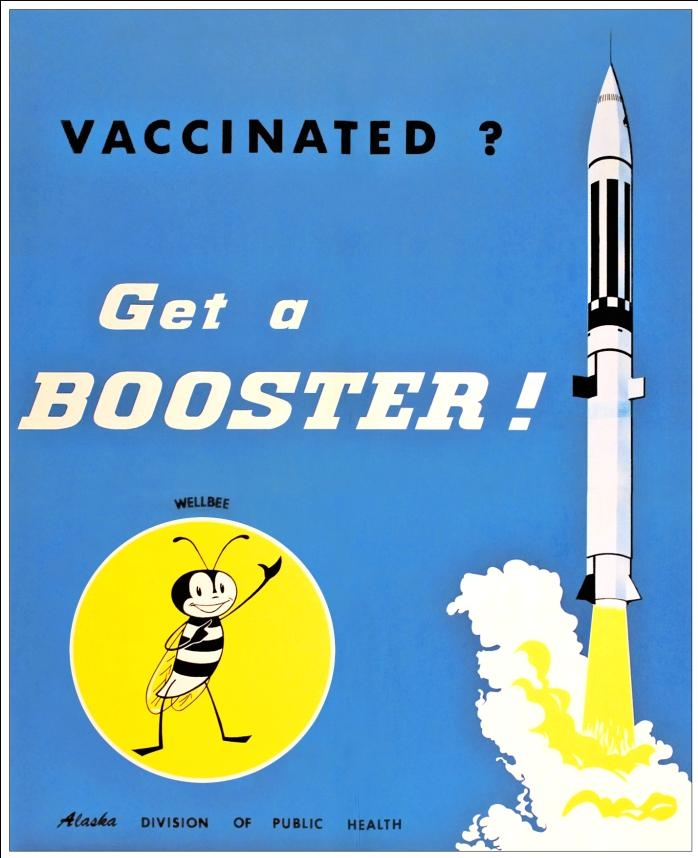

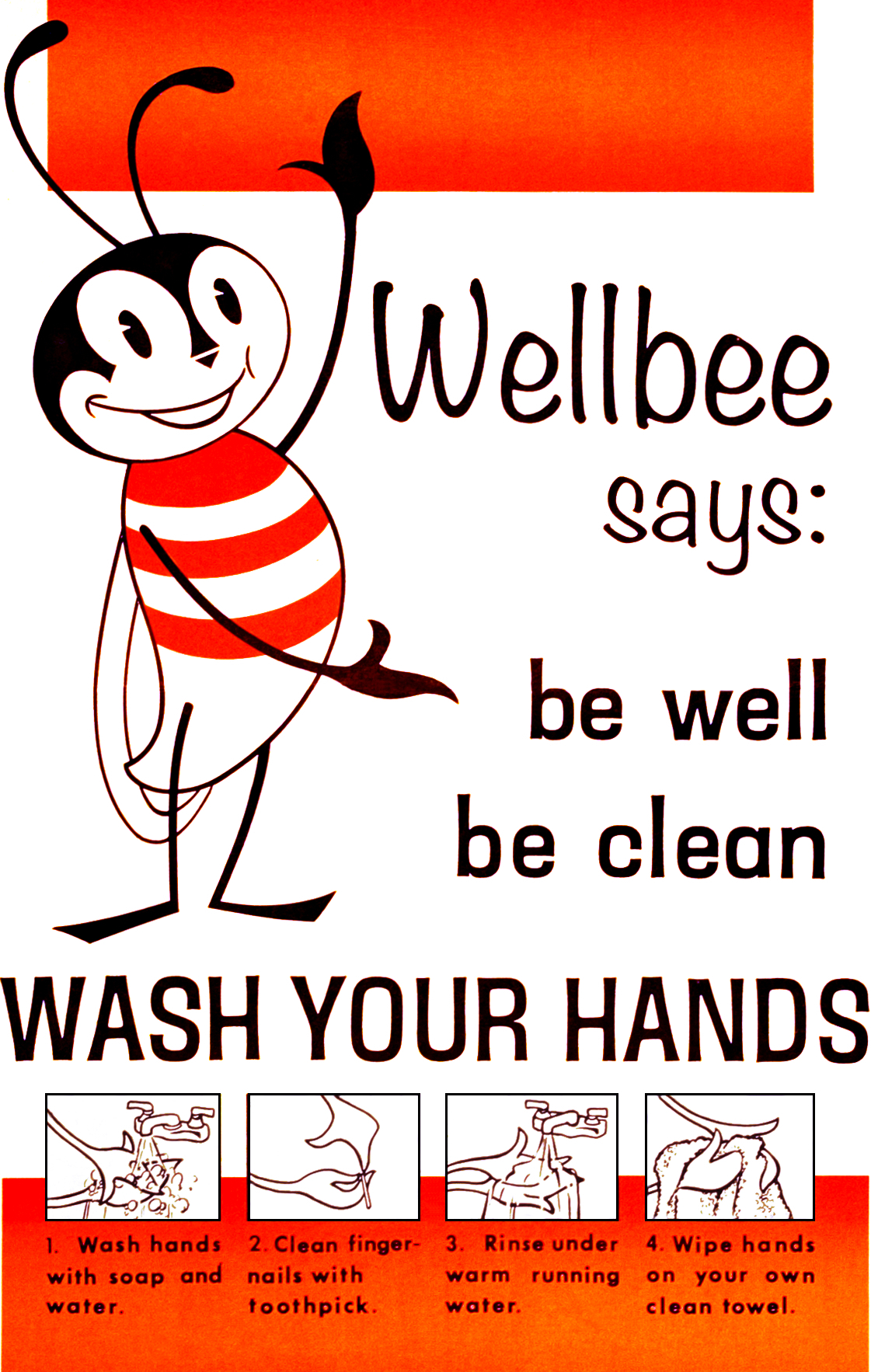

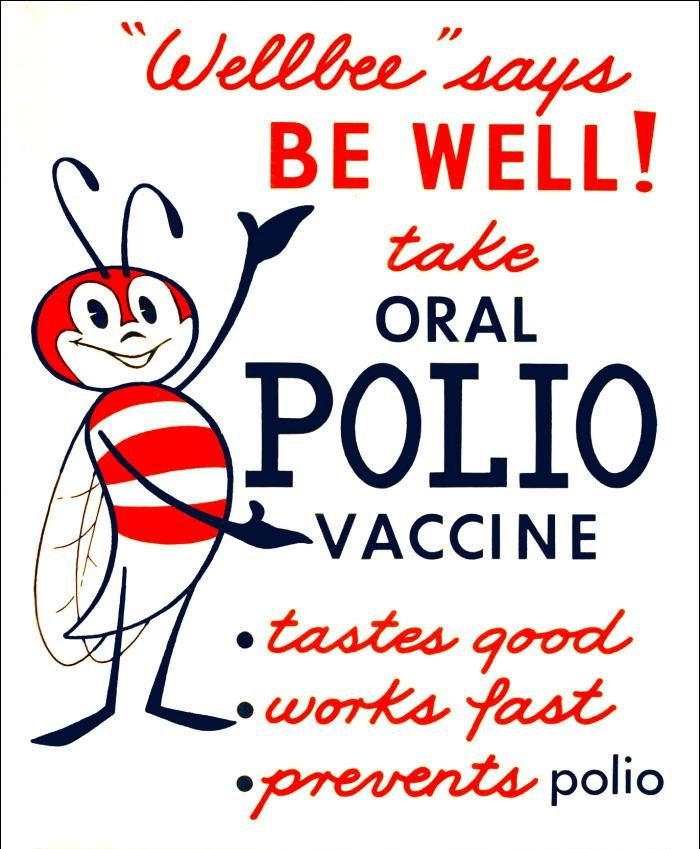
