= Alan Miller (entrepreneur) =

American business executive

- Born: United States
- Citizenship: American
- Occupations: Entrepreneur, business executive
- Organization: COLLiDE marketing agency
- Known for: Co-founder of music magazine Filter and founder of COLLiDE marketing agency and the sport brand Official League

Alan Miller is an American entrepreneur and business executive. He is the owner, CEO and President of Official League, a sports apparel brand, as well as multiple sports teams. Miller is the founder of COLLiDE, a marketing agency specializing in entertainment and lifestyle products.

In 2003, Miller co-founded FILTER Magazine, which later launched the seasonal Culture Collide festival. The magazine had expanded its reach to several countries.

== Career ==
In 2014, Miller established "COLLiDE Agency," a marketing agency specializing in campaigns for entertainment and lifestyle brands.

In 2017, Miller co-founded "COLLiDE Sport" alongside Jon Ryan. They ventured into sports team ownership. The venture operated and operates several sports teams, including baseball team the Lake County Captains (High A Guardians), Portland Pickles, Cleburne Railroaders (sold in 2024), rugby team Dallas Jackals (sold in 2024), and the soccer teams Portland Bangers FC and Portland Cherry Bombs FC (both founded in 2025).

Portland Pickles' ascent to the West Coast League and their status as the premier college wood bat team in attendance and talent in North America has earned Alan Miller the esteemed title of Executive of the Year in 2019, in the West Coast League. In 2024 the Pickles won the West Coast League championship. The story was documented in the documentary Pickles Pickles Pickles that debuted on February 15th 2025 on MLB network. The Pickles also won Front office sports best places to work for two consecutive years (2023, 2024).

In 2022, Alan introduced "Official League," a lifestyle brand devoted to sports fans. The brand offers wearable art. In 2024 the company opened its store in Portland Oregon.
