= Spec Keene Stadium =

College baseball stadium in Salem, Oregon

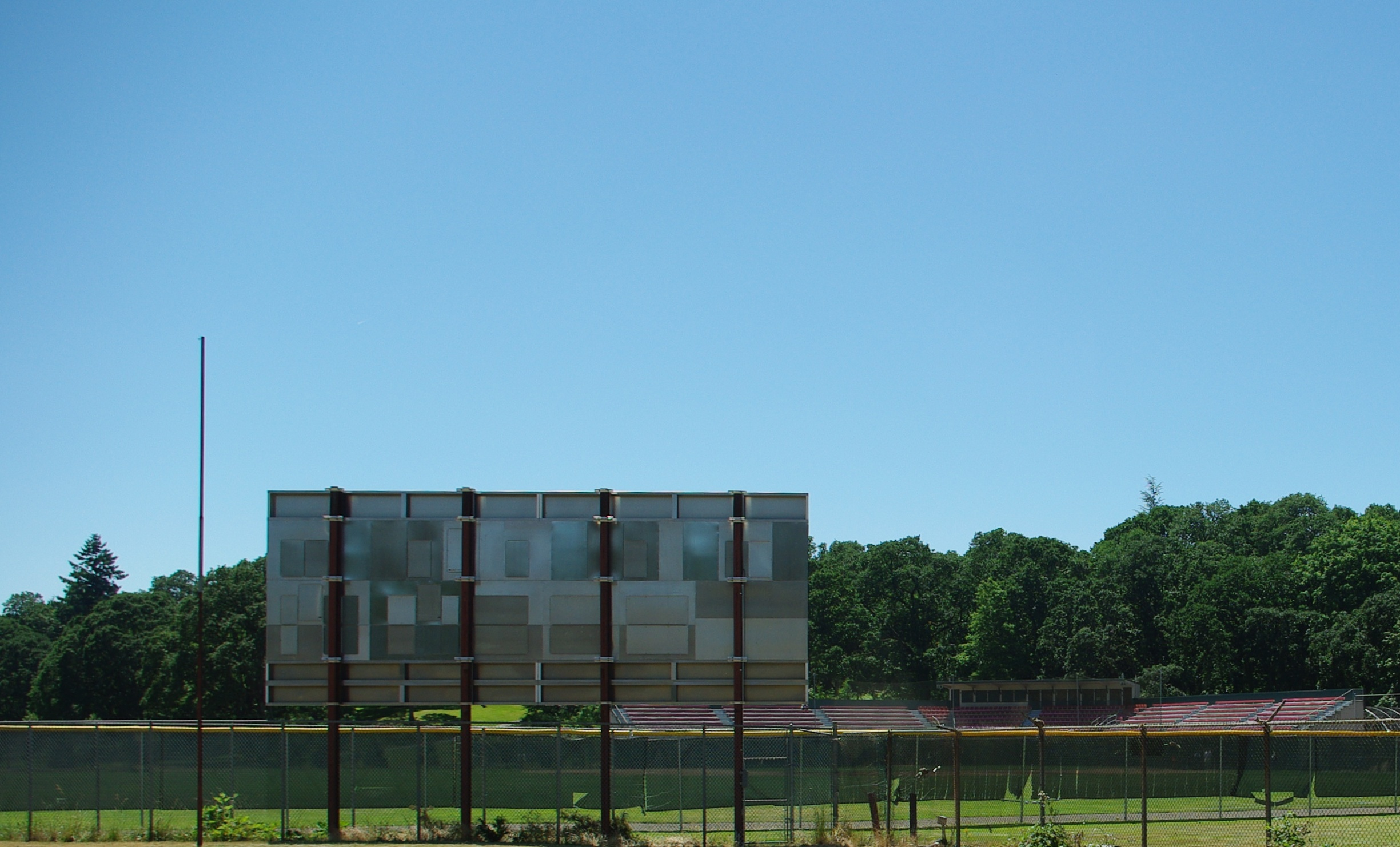
- Stadium in 2009

- Location in the United States Location in Oregon
- Location: Bush's Pasture Park; Salem, Oregon, U.S.
- Coordinates: 44.9285°N 123.0376°W
- Owner: Willamette University
- Operator: Willamette University
- Capacity: 1,500

Construction
- Opened: 1989; 37 years ago
- Renovated: 2019, 2020

Tenants
- Willamette Bearcats baseball (NCAA) (1989–present); Marion Berries (WCL) (2025–present)

Spec Keene Stadium is the home ballpark for the Willamette University Bearcats baseball team in Salem, Oregon. Located in Bush's Pasture Park to the south of the campus, it is adjacent to the university's McCulloch Stadium. It is named after Spec Keene, a longtime coach at the school as well as the athletic director at Oregon State University. The stadium also is the home field for the Marion Berries of the wood-bat West Coast League.

== History ==
The diamond at the stadium is named John Lewis Field, which opened in the 1940s. The college built the stadium in 1989. In 2019, Willamette added artificial turf along the baseline, bullpen areas, the pitching mound, and home plate. The following year the clubhouse at the stadium was also renovated. During the 2023-2024 Oregon Legislature, lawmakers allocated $3 million for upgrades at the stadium, such as lighting and turf improvements. The overall budget for the upgrades was $6.3 million, with the school responsible for the majority of the remaining funds. Funding was in part due to lobbying of the Salem Baseball Club that planned to play home games in the West Coast League in 2025 at the stadium. That team, later named the Marion Berries, began play in June 2025 at Chemeketa Community College due to the renovations to Spec Keene. The team later decided not to play home games in 2026 either, despite renovations scheduled to be complete by the time the season started.

== Details ==
Spec Keene seats 1,500 in its grandstands and has artificial turf in portions of the playing field.
