= Booster dose =

Additional administration of vaccine

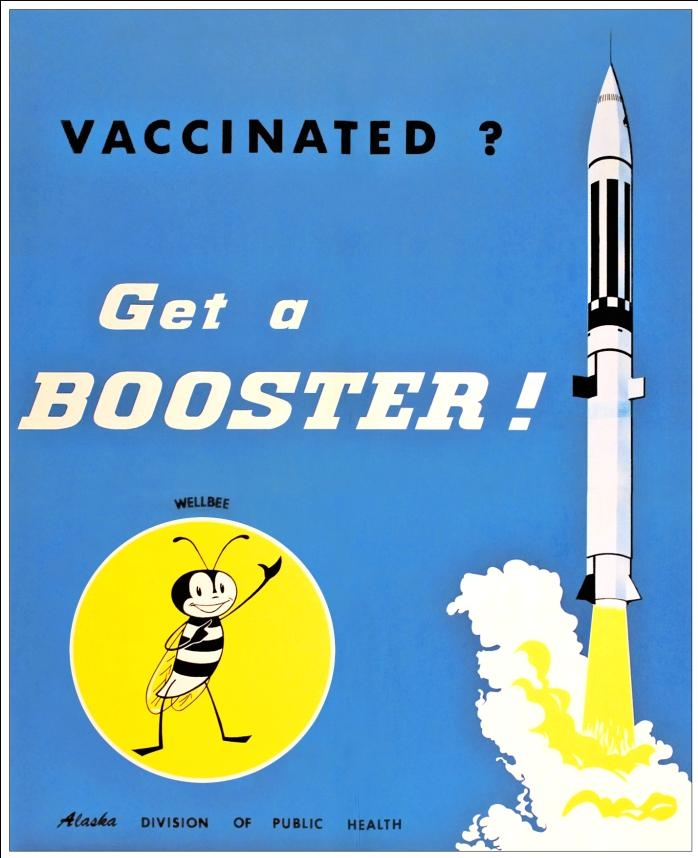
1964 American "Wellbee" poster promoting booster vaccines

A booster dose is an extra administration of a vaccine after an earlier (primer) dose. After initial immunization, a booster provides a re-exposure to the immunizing antigen. It is intended to increase immunity against that antigen back to protective levels after memory against that antigen has declined through time. For example, tetanus shot boosters are often recommended every 10 years, by which point memory cells specific against tetanus lose their function or undergo apoptosis.

The need for a booster dose following a primary vaccination is evaluated in several ways. One way is to measure the level of antibodies specific against a disease a few years after the primary dose is given. Anamnestic response, the rapid production of antibodies after a stimulus of an antigen, is a typical way to measure the need for a booster dose of a certain vaccine. If the anamnestic response is high after receiving a primary vaccine many years ago, there is most likely little to no need for a booster dose. People can also measure the active B and T cell activity against that antigen after a certain amount of time that the primary vaccine was administered or determine the prevalence of the disease in vaccinated populations.

If a patient receives a booster dose but already has a high level of antibody, then a reaction called an Arthus reaction could develop, a localized form of Type III hypersensitivity induced by high levels of IgG antibodies causing inflammation. The inflammation is often self-resolved over the course of a few days but could be avoided altogether by increasing the length of time between the primary vaccine and the booster dose.

It is not yet fully clear why some vaccines such as hepatitis A and B are effective for life, and some such as tetanus need boosters. The prevailing theory is that if the immune system responds to a primary vaccine rapidly, the body does not have time to sufficiently develop immunological memory against the disease, and memory cells will not persist in high numbers for the lifetime of the human. After a primary response of the immune system against a vaccination, memory T helper cells and B cells persist at a fairly constant level in germinal centers, undergoing cell division at a slow to nonexistent rate. While these cells are long-lived, they do not typically undergo mitosis, and eventually, the rate of loss of these cells will be greater than the rate of gain. In these cases, a booster dose is required to "boost" the memory B and T cell count back up again.

== Polio booster doses ==
In the case of the polio vaccine, the memory B and T cells produced in response to the vaccine persist only six months after consumption of the oral polio vaccine (OPV). Booster doses of the OPV were found ineffective, as they, too, resulted in decreased immune response every six months after consumption. However, when the inactive polio vaccine (IPV) was used as a booster dose, it was found to increase the test subjects' antibody count by 39–75%. Often in developing countries, OPV is used over IPV, because IPV is expensive and hard to transport. Also, IPVs in tropical countries are hard to store due to the climate. However, in places where polio is still present, following up an OPV primary dose with an IPV booster may help eradicate the disease.

In the United States, only the IPV is used. In rare cases (about 1 in 2.7 million), the OPV has reverted to a strengthened form of the illness, and caused paralysis in the recipients of the vaccine. For this reason, the US only administers IPV, which is given in four increments (3 within their first year and a half after birth, then one booster dose between the ages 4–6).

== Hepatitis B booster doses ==
The need for a booster dose for hepatitis B has long been debated. Studies in the early 2000s that measured memory cell count of vaccinated individuals showed that fully vaccinated adults (those that received all three rounds of vaccination at the suggested time sequence during infancy) do not require a booster dose later in life. Both the United States Centers for Disease Control (CDC) and the Canadian National Advisory Committee on Immunization (NACI) supported these recommendations by publicly advising against the need for a hepatitis B booster dose. However, immuno-repressed individuals are advised to seek further screening to evaluate their immune response to hepatitis B, and potentially receive a booster dose if their B and T cell count against hepatitis B decrease below a certain level.

== Tetanus booster dose ==
The tetanus disease requires a booster dose every 10 years, or in some circumstances immediately following infection of tetanus. Td is the name of the booster for adults, and differs from the primary dose in that it does not include immunization against pertussis (whooping cough). While the US recommends a booster for tetanus every 10 years, other countries, such as the UK, suggest just two booster shots within the first 20 years of life, but no booster after a third decade. Neonatal tetanus is a concern during pregnancy for some women, and mothers are recommended a booster against tetanus during their pregnancy in order to protect their child against the disease.

== Whooping cough booster dose ==
Whooping cough, also called pertussis, is a contagious disease that affects the respiratory tract. The infection is caused by a bacterium that sticks to the cilia of the upper respiratory tract and can be very contagious. Pertussis can be especially dangerous for babies, whose immune systems are not yet fully developed, and can develop into pneumonia or result in the baby having trouble breathing. DTaP is the primary vaccine given against pertussis, and children typically receive five doses before the age of seven. Tdap is the booster for pertussis, and is advised in the US to be administered every ten years, and during every pregnancy for mothers. Tdap can also be used as a booster against tetanus.

Upon its invention in the 1950s, the pertussis vaccine was whole-cell (contained the entire inactivated bacterium), and could cause fever and local reactions in people who received the vaccine. In the 1990s, people in the US started using acellular vaccines (contained small portions of the bacterium), that had lower side effects but were also less effective at triggering an immunological memory response, due to the antigen presented to the immune system being less complete. This less effective, but safer vaccine, led to the development of the booster Tdap.

== COVID-19 booster dose ==
As of September 2021, protection against severe disease remained high at 6 months after vaccination despite lower efficacy in protection from COVID-19 infection. An international panel of scientists affiliated with the FDA, WHO, and several universities and healthcare institutions, concluded that there was insufficient data to determine the long-term protective benefits of a booster dose (only short-term protective effects were observed), and recommended instead that existing vaccine stock would save most lives if made available to people who had not received any vaccine.

Israel first rolled out booster doses of the Pfizer–BioNTech COVID-19 vaccine for at-risk populations in July 2021. In August this was expanded for the rest of the Israeli population. Effectiveness against severe disease in Israel was lower among people vaccinated either in January or April than in those vaccinated in February or March. During the first 3 weeks of August 2021, just after booster doses were approved and began to be deployed widely, a short-term protective effect of a third dose (relative to two doses) was suggested.

In the United States, the CDC rolled out booster shots to immunocompromised individuals during the summer of 2021 and originally planned to allow adults to receive a third dose of the COVID-19 vaccine starting in September 2021, with individuals becoming eligible starting 8 months after their second dose (for those who received a two-dose vaccine). After further data about long-term vaccine efficacy and the delta variant came to light, the CDC ultimately made recipients eligible for boosters 6 months after the second shot, in late October. Subsequently, vaccinations in the country surged.

In September 2021, the UK's Joint Committee on Vaccination and Immunisation recommended a booster shot for the over-50s and at-risk groups, preferably the Pfizer–BioNTech vaccine, meaning about 30 million adults should receive a third dose. The UK's booster rollout was extended to over-40s in November 2021.

Russia's Sputnik V COVID-19 vaccine, using similar technology to AstraZeneca's COVID-19 vaccine, in November 2021 introduced a COVID-19 booster called Sputnik Light, which according to a study by the Gamaleya Research Institute of Epidemiology and Microbiology has an effectiveness of 70% against the delta variant. It can be combined with all other vaccines and may be more effective with mRNA vaccines than mRNA boosters.

Booster shots can also be used after infections. In this regard, the UK's National Health Service recommends people to wait 28 days after testing positive for COVID-19 before getting their booster shots. Evidence shows that getting a vaccine after recovery from a COVID-19 infection provides added protection to the immune system.

In 2025, researchers from Switzerland reported that COVID-19 booster injections increased the risk of having influenza-like respiratory illness (ILI) and being absent through sickness, performing negative binomial regression analysis. Their research indicated that ILI frequency was significantly higher in those who got three (adjusted incident rate ratio (aIRR) 1.59, p-value<0.001) or four doses (aIRR 1.70, p-value<0.001) of Covid shots compared to subjects with one or two (aIRR 1.29, p-value>0.05) doses. The third or fourth doses of the vaccines led to 49 percent (p-value 0.011) or 50 percent (p-value 0.028) increases respectively in sick leave compared to unvaccinated.
