= Marion Berries =

Collegiate baseball team in Salem, Oregon

Logo
Cap insignia

Information
- League: West Coast League (2025–present)
- Location: Salem, Oregon
- Ballpark: Chemeketa Community College
- Founded: 2024
- Nickname: Berries
- League championships: 0
- Division championships: 0
- Colors: Dark Purple, Berry Blue, Green and White
- Ownership: Salem Baseball Club, LLC; Luke Emanuel
- President: Luke Emanuel
- General manager: Pat Zajac
- Manager: TBA
- Website: www.marionberriesbaseball.com

The Marion Berries are a collegiate summer wood bat baseball team based in Salem, Oregon. They play in the South Division of the West Coast League, a premier collegiate summer baseball league based in the Pacific Northwest and British Columbia. The Berries play their home games at Chemeketa Community College.

== History ==
=== Team founding and naming (2024) ===
On January 19, 2024, the West Coast League announces that Salem would be the host of the league's 17th team, an expansion franchise. Months later after a name-the-team contest, the team became officially known as the Marion Berries. The name's origin comes from the popular marionberry that was discovered in 1956, leading to a robust berry industry in the heart of the Willamette Valley. The Berries are the latest baseball team to play in the Salem region joining the professional former Minor League Baseball team the Salem-Keizer Volcanoes and the Mavericks League.

=== 2025 ===
The Berries played their first ever home game on June 23 defeating the Corvallis Knights 14-7. The Berries play their home games at Chemeketa Field due to their planned ballpark of Spec Keene Stadium not being ready for the season. Chemeketa Field hosted the Salem Senators minor league team in 1978. Spec Keene Stadium at Bush’s Pasture Park, owned by Willamette University, was undergoing renovations, and the team opting to not use it again in 2026.

Paul Vasquez (Oregon State) was named player of the week by the league on July 7. On July 8, it was announced that Alex Chavez (Loyola Marymount), Danny Wideman (Oregon) and Steven Verespey (Willamette) were selected to represent the Berries at the All Star Game in Bellingham.

The Berries went 28-26 and finished fourth in the South Division in their first season of fielding a team. Verespey finished tied for fourth in the league with four pitching wins and finished second in the league with a 1.45 ERA. 25,128 total fans attended the Berries' twenty-four home games for an average of 1,047 fans per game.

The Berries clinched a wildcard berth for their first ever playoff appearance. The Berries faced the Pickles in the South Divisional Series but were swept two games to zero.

=== Results by Season ===
| League champions | Division champions | Division Regular Season Champions | Playoff berth |

| Year | League | Division | Finish | W | L | Win% | GB | Postseason | Manager |
|---|---|---|---|---|---|---|---|---|---|
| 2025 | WCL | South | 4th | 28 | 26 | .519 | 15.5 | Lost South Divisional Series 0-2 (Pickles) | Tucker Brack |
| 2026 | WCL | South | 6th | 21 | 33 | .388 | 10 | Did Not Qualify | Tucker Brack |
