= Dillon T. Pickle =

Portland Pickles mascot

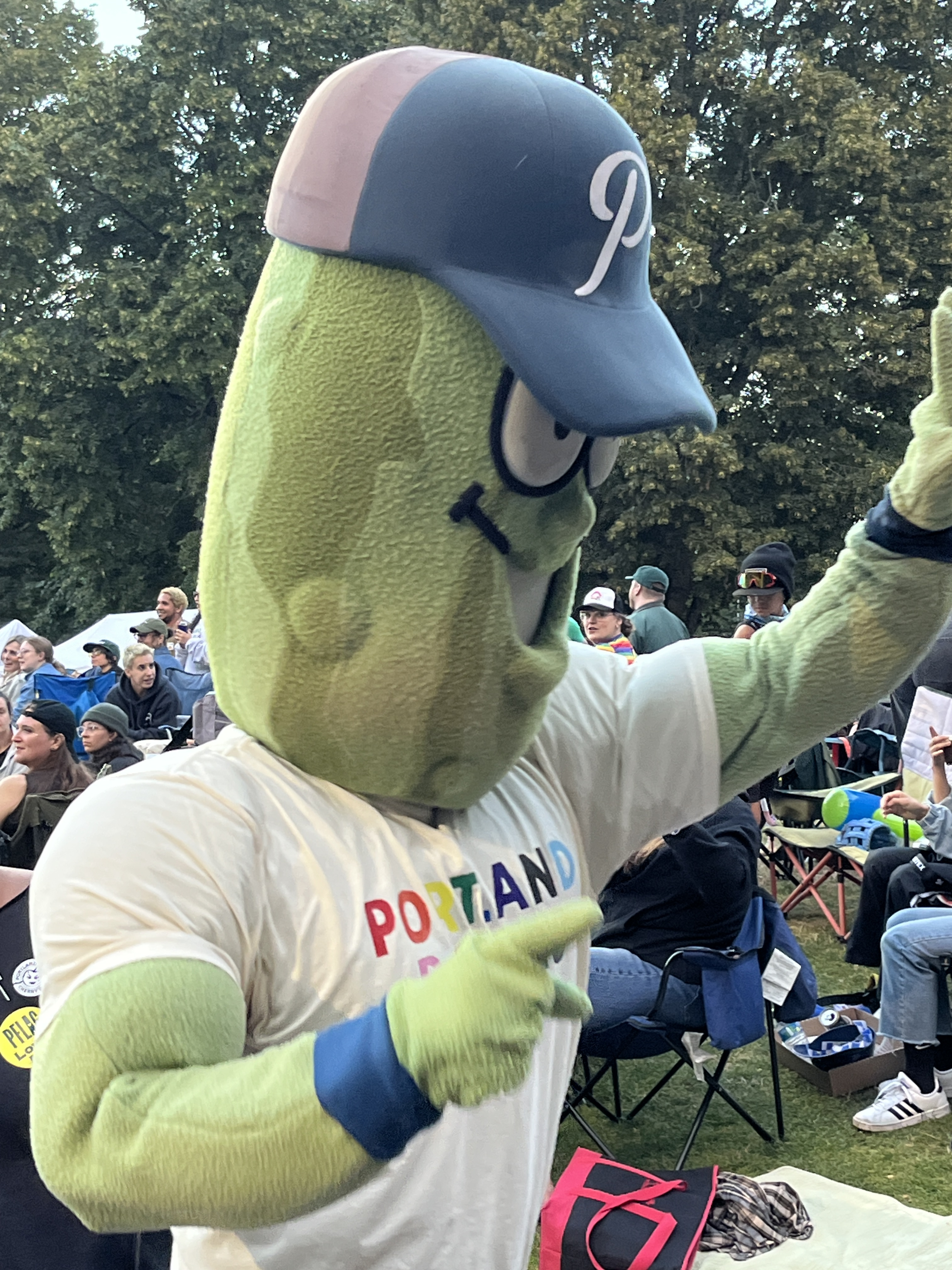
- Dillon T. Pickle at the Portland Pickles' Pride Night game in 2026
- Team: Portland Pickles

Dillon T. Pickle is the mascot for the Portland Pickles baseball team, in the U.S. state of Oregon.

== Description ==
Dillon T. Pickle is the mascot for the Portland Pickles baseball team. Dillon is a 7-foot-tall pickled cucumber. The "T." stands for "The".

== History ==
In January 2022, Pickles mascot Dillon T. Pickle posted an inappropriate photo on Twitter during a social media takeover. The image appeared to show the mascot exposing his genitalia.

In February 2022, the mascot costume for Dillon T. Pickle was stolen after delivery in a case of package theft. The team had been playing in the Dominican Republic and the luggage containing the mascot costume was separated from the team. After being found by the airline, it was shipped to the wrong address in Portland and subsequently stolen off the front porch. It was eventually dropped off at Voodoo Doughnut by a person wishing to remain anonymous. The incident attracted the attention of some national media, who covered the saga in an amused fashion.

Dillon T. Pickle was the grand marshal of the Starlight Parade in 2025. Dillon T. Pickle won in the Best Mascot category of Willamette Week's annual 'Best of Portland' readers' poll in 2025 and 2026.

Portland Pickles sells bobbleheads of the mascot.

== See also ==
- List of mascots
  - List of Major League Baseball mascots
