= Freedom Frog =

Fictional frog character from Intervention Helpline

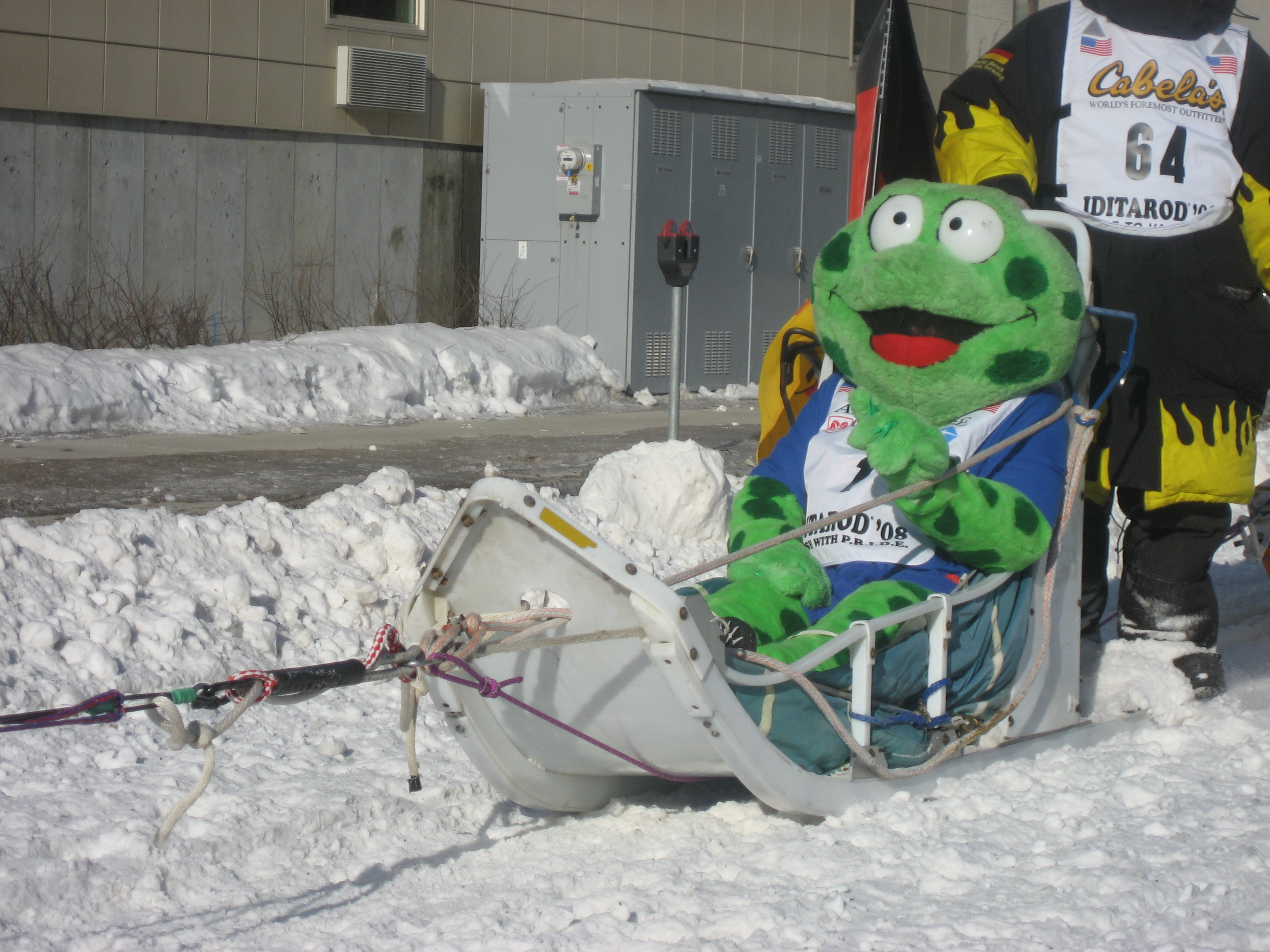
Freedom Frog at 2008 Iditarod.

Freedom Frog is a frog mascot character of Intervention Helpline, an Alaska counseling nonprofit organization. The organization uses Freedom Frog for scholar and other organization animations. Freedom Frog occasionally appears during the ceremonial start of the Iditarod Trail Sled Dog Race in Anchorage. The character is sponsored by the Municipality of Anchorage.
