= Portland Rose Garden =

Portland Rose Garden may refer to:

- International Rose Test Garden, a rose garden in Portland, Oregon
- Moda Center, an indoor sports arena in Portland, Oregon formerly known as the Rose Garden
