= Zé Gotinha =

Mascot for the Brazilian polio vaccination campaign

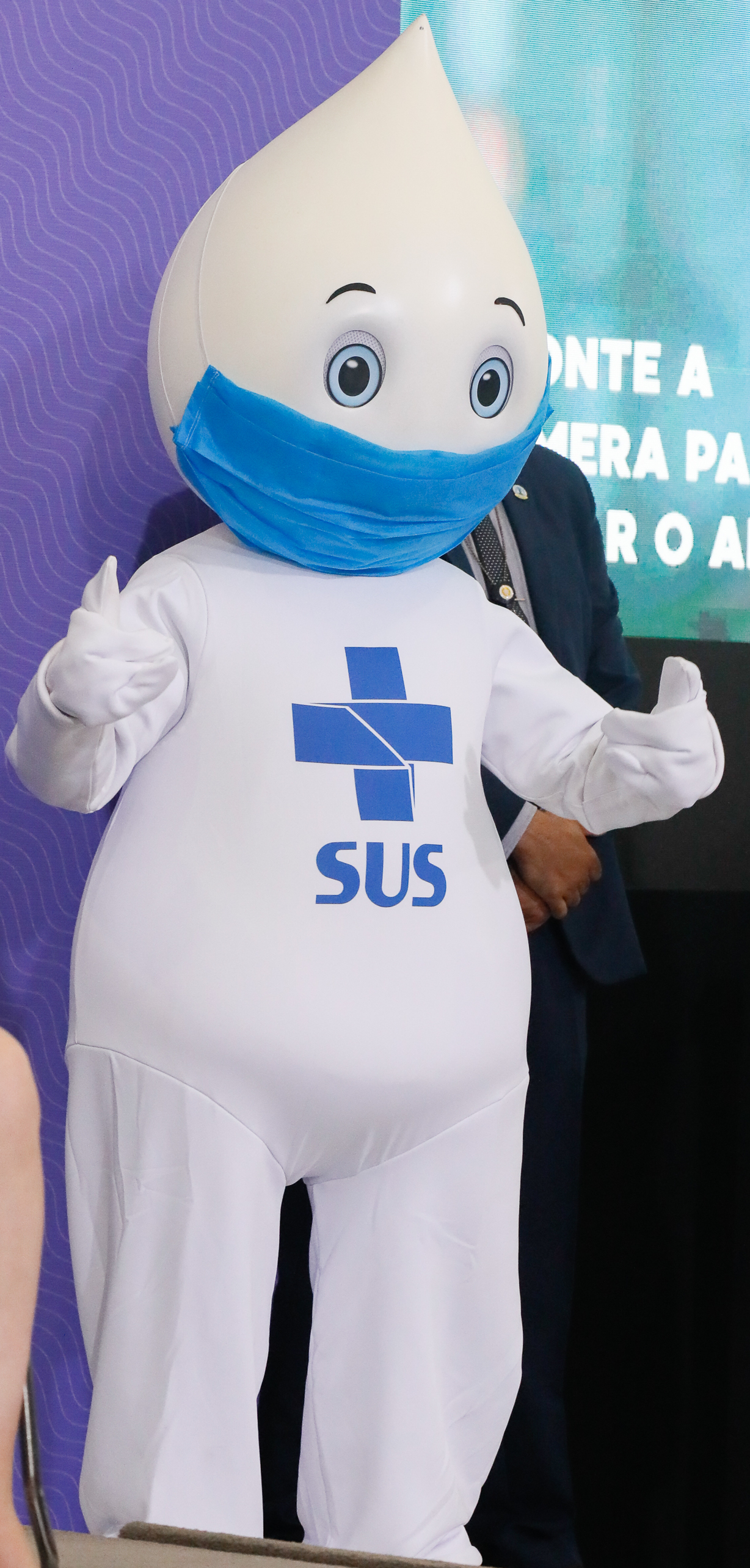
Zé Gotinha, wearing a mask, featured at the Launch of the National Vaccination Operationalization Plan against COVID-19 in 2020

Zé Gotinha (Note: Brazilian Portuguese pronunciation: [zɛ ɡoˈtʃiɲɐ], meaning "Droplet Joe"; Zé is the nickname of José.) is a Brazilian mascot created to promote vaccination campaigns against the polio virus with the goal of making the event more attractive to children. It was used in campaigns in the 1980s, 1990s, and 2006 campaigns to raise awareness among parents and children about the importance of vaccination. Zé Gotinha has also been used to warn about the importance of preventing various other diseases.

Zé Gotinha became popular among children and was established as a synonym for vaccination and as a reference for the population in terms of prevention methods. In the years following its creation, the character adopted a different color for each vaccine: white for polio, red for measles, navy blue for tuberculosis, light blue for whooping cough, orange for diphtheria, and green for tetanus.

== History ==
Zé Gotinha was created in 1986 by artist Darlan Rosa at the request of the Brazilian Ministry of Health. His name was chosen through a national contest promoted by the Ministry of Health with students from schools all over Brazil. The winning name was a suggestion from a student from the Federal District. Thus, the campaigns against polio, featuring the character, began to be disseminated in newspapers, TVs, and radio.

The character's main objective was to make vaccination campaigns more attractive to children, and thereby make vaccination a festive day, making children want to participate.

Currently, Zé Gotinha is the symbol of the National Immunization Program.
