= Portland Pickles =

Baseball team in Portland, Oregon

- Logo

Information
- League: West Coast League (2018–present)
- Location: Portland, Oregon
- Ballpark: Charles B. Walker Stadium at Lents Park
- Founded: 2015
- Nickname: Picks
- League championships: 1 (2024)
- Division championships: 2 (2024, 2025)
- Former league(s): Great West League (2016–2017); Wild Wild West League (2020)
- Colors: Navy Blue, Green and White
- Mascot: Dillon T. Pickle
- Ownership: COLLiDE Sport
- General manager: Courtney Schmidt
- Manager: Mark Magdaleno
- Website: www.portlandpicklesbaseball.com

The Portland Pickles are a collegiate men's summer baseball wooden bat team based in Portland, Oregon. They play in the South Division of the West Coast League, a premier collegiate summer baseball league based in the Pacific Northwest, British Columbia and Alberta. The Pickles play their home games at Walker Stadium in Portland's Lents Park.

== History ==
=== Team founding and naming (2015) ===
Original logo (2015–2023)

In 2010, the Portland Beavers minor league baseball club left Portland, leaving the city without a team. On March 11, 2015, it was announced that baseball would return to Portland with the establishment of a new collegiate wood-bat team. The as-yet-unnamed team would be owned and operated by Rose City Baseball LLC, in partnership with the city of Portland, and would play its games at Charles B. Walker Stadium in Lents Park.

On April 21, 2015, team officials announced the team's name at Woodstock Elementary School in Southeast Portland. The name was selected by online voting from six candidates. In order of vote, Pickles was followed by Mud Hounds, Red Dogs, Posse, Pliers, and Pixels. In August, J.J. Altobelli was named as the team's first manager. The team introduced its mascot, Dillon the pickle, in October.

=== Great West League (2015–2017) ===
The Pickles were charter members of the Great West League, having been founded by GWL commissioner Ken Wilson. The Pickles (claimed to have) played before 16 sell-outs and to 99% of capacity in their inaugural 2016 season (announced figures).

On April 5, 2017, it was announced that Seattle Seahawks punter Jon Ryan and marketing entrepreneur Alan Miller would become part of the Pickles ownership group, along with members from Rose City Baseball LLC. Former Major League Baseball pitcher and Oregon-native Jeff Lahti took over the managerial role for the 2017 season, leading the Pickles to their first playoff berth. They were eliminated from the Great West League playoffs by the Medford Rogues in the semifinals.

=== West Coast League (2018–2019) ===
On October 24, 2017, the Pickles announced that they were leaving the GWL and joining the West Coast League. Prior to the 2018 season, Gresham GreyWolves head coach Justin Barchus replaced Lahti as manager.

The Pickles won the South Division in the first half of the season with a 17–9 record, securing them a playoff spot in their first year. Portland went on to claim the best record in the WCL by going 37–17 overall, but could not get past the Corvallis Knights in the first round of playoffs. Justin Barchus went on to win WCL Coach of the Year along with Kelowna Falcons manager Bryan Donohue.

In February 2019, Miller and Ryan took over full ownership of the team. On May 15, the Pickles announced a two-year partnership with CBD company Lazarus Naturals, the first of its kind in baseball history. Lazarus Naturals sponsored a concert series at the stadium and provided luxury box seating for selected veterans.

In December, it was announced that Rose City Baseball would operate a farm team called the Portland Gherkins for the 2020 season. The Gherkins would play games against the Pickles, WCL opponents, and other independent teams.

=== Wild Wild West League (2020) ===
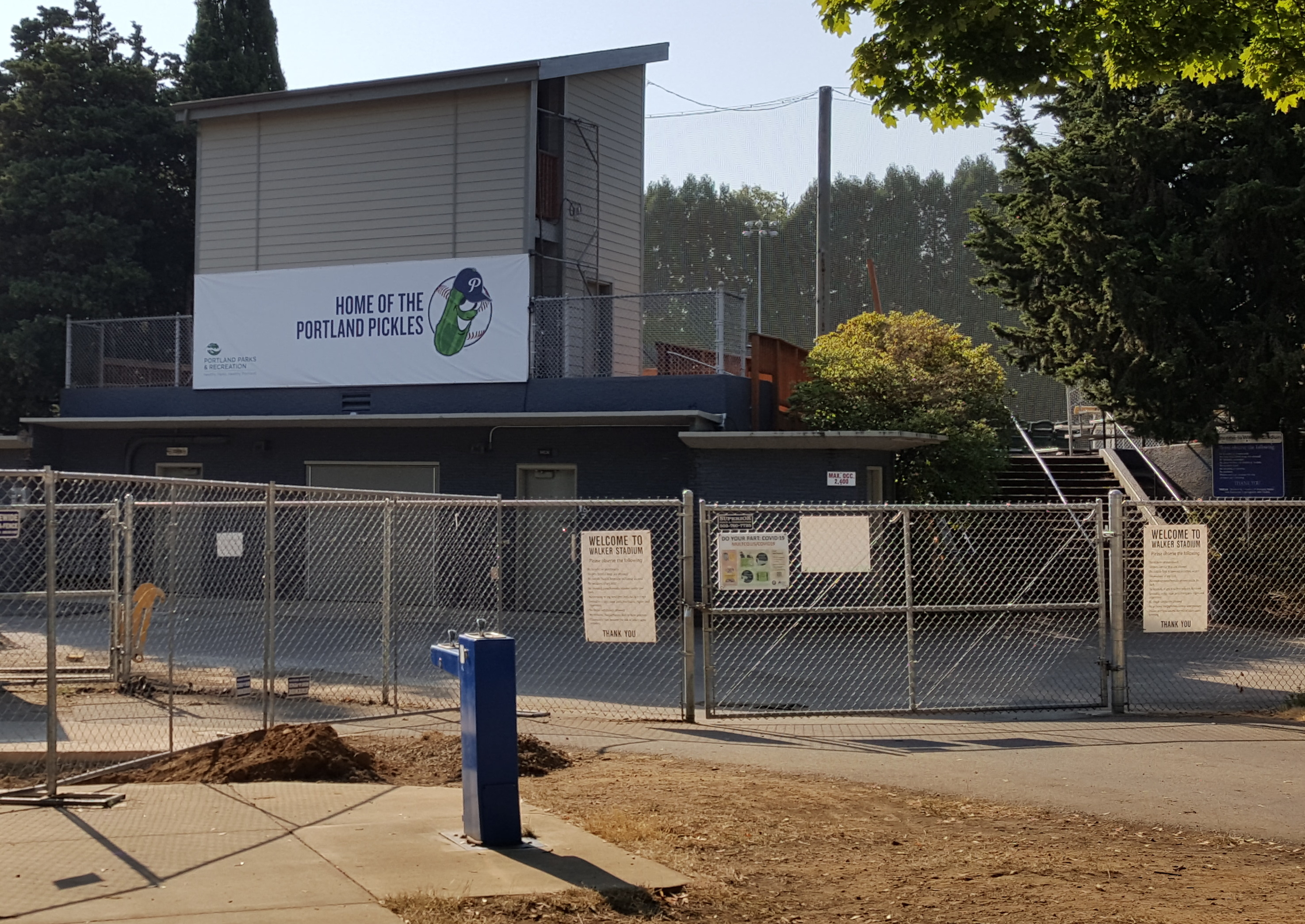
Portland Pickles banner at Walker Stadium, Lents Park, 2020

On June 5, 2020, the West Coast League board of directors voted to cancel the 2020 season due to COVID-19 pandemic. The Pickles organization founded the Wild Wild West League in response, playing in Bob Brack Stadium at North Marion High School in Aurora, Oregon. The league consisted of four teams: the Pickles, Portland Gherkins, Gresham GreyWolves, and West Linn Knights.

A limited number of fans were permitted to attend, and games were broadcast on Facebook and YouTube. Games ran from July to August. The West Linn Knights beat the Pickles in the championship series.

=== West Coast League (2021–present) ===
After 2020, the Pickles returned to the West Coast League for the 2021 season. The Wild Wild West League continued and added the Portland Rosebuds and Willamette Wild Bills, two new teams that were also owned by Rose City Baseball.

On June 8, 2021, the Pickles promoted manager Justin Barchus to Director of Player Personnel/Operations and made Mark Magdaleno the new manager. In November 2021, the Pickles opened The Pickle Jar, a retail store and community space in downtown Portland.

On July 18, 2022, intern Emily Paulson became the first woman to play for the Pickles. That year, the Pickles were crowned the Southern Division champions, ending a four-year playoff drought. The team was ultimately swept in the first round by the Ridgefield Raptors.

In 2023, the Pickles swept the Ridgefield Raptors in the first round of the playoffs to face the Corvallis Knights in the Divisional Championship game. The Pickles lost the game 4–1 and were eliminated from the playoffs.

=== 2024 ===
In March 2024, Rose City Baseball opened the Portland Pickles Public House, a Portland Pickles-themed sports bar on Mississippi Avenue.

On July 9, Tanner Griffith, Patrick Keighran, Freddie Rodriguez, and Shay Timmer were selected to represent the Pickles in the 2024 all star game in Bellingham.

The Pickles qualified for the playoffs for the third straight season and clinched the South Division Second Half Championship. The Pickles swept the Elks 2–0 in the Divisional Series and upset the seven time defending WCL Champion Knights in Corvallis to win their first South Division Championship in franchise history. The Pickles hosted the AppleSox in the WCL Championship Game.

Going into the bottom of the ninth inning of a close game, the Pickles found themselves down 4–5. With the bases loaded, Diego Castellanos walked to force home the tying run. On the very next pitch, Conner Stewart hit a hard ground ball that wasn't fielded cleanly, and Tanner Griffith scored to give the Pickles the walkoff win and their first WCL Championship. Commissioner Rob Neyer was unable to award the Pickles the trophy for a long period of time due to fans streaming onto the field.

The Pickles released a feature length documentary titled Pickles, Pickles, Pickles on MLB Network, February 15, 2025. Documenting their story and run to their Championship, the 47 min feature is available on MLB.TV.

=== 2025 ===
On June 2, Ryder Edwards (George Fox) was named pitcher of the week by the league. One week later, Josh Schleichardt (Vanguard) was named the league's player of the week on June 9.

The Pickles clinched the South Division First Half Title and their fourth straight playoff berth on June 25.

On July 8, it was announced that Edwards, Schleichardt, Kyle McDaniel and Petey Soho, Jr. (Utah Tech), Aiden Taurek (Saint Mary's), Zachary Fechtel (Texas Tech) and Dylan Smith (Northern Colorado) were selected to represent the Pickles at the All-Star Game in Bellingham. With six total, the Pickles had the most all stars among the League's 17 teams.

The Pickles improved on their 40–14 record from the previous season. The Pickles set the record for most wins in a season with a 43–11 record and finished first in the South Division. Schleichardt lead the league with eighteen home runs and sixty-four runs batted in. Joey Wright (California Davis) and Tony Otis (William Jessup) finished with batting averages of .364 and .333 respectively with Wright finishing second in the league in batting averages. Bryson Glassco (Oregon State) was second in the league with fifty home runs. Ari Kligman (Sacramento State) and Edwards finished tied for second with five pitching wins. The Pickles finished second in the WCL in attendance, as 99,787 total fans attended the team's twenty-eight home games for an average of 3,564 per game.

The Pickles swept the Marion Berries in the South Divisional Series and defeated the Knights in the South Division Championship Game 6–5 to advance to their second consecutive WCL Championship Game. The Pickles hosted the Bellingham Bells, to whom they lost 2-1 in the championship game.

=== 2026 ===
Former Pickles Cashel Dugger, Kenny Ishikawa, and Alex Overbay participated in the 2026 MLB Draft Combine.

=== Bangers FC and Cherry Bombs FC ===
On January 21, 2025, the team's ownership group COLLiDE Sport announced the formation of a new pre-professional men's soccer team, later named Portland Bangers FC, that would play in USL League Two's Northwest Division.

On November 4, 2025, the ownership group announced the formation of a new pre-professional women's soccer team, Portland Cherry Bombs FC, that would play in USL W League.

=== Relationship with Mazatlan ===
The Portland Pickles have a special relationship with Venados de Mazatlan of the Mexican Pacific League. In June 2019, the Pickles held Venados Night, where the team wore Mazatlan jerseys. In October, the Pickles traveled to Mexico and played against Venados de Mazatlan in a friendly exhibition game in front of 16,000 people. In the lead up to the game, the Pickles held tryouts amongst fans in Portland for the chance to travel with the team to Mexico and play in the game.

In September 2021, the Pickles returned to Mexico for another series against Venados de Mazatlan. USA Baseball's Kelsie Whitmore joined the Pickles and threw five scoreless innings in game two.

== Controversies ==
The Pickles hosted a "mascot takeover" on their X account in January 2022. The Pickles posted an image of their mascot Dillon T. Pickle in a way that it looked like the mascot was flashing himself. The team would defend the post as Dillon flashing a thumbs-up.

In May 2025, The Pickles filed a lawsuit against Pixar regarding potential copyright infringement over the similarities between the team's likeness in the series Win or Lose. Both parties reached an undisclosed settlement shortly after.

On July 14, 2026, the Pickles hosted a Heated Rivalry themed night that involved two players kissing. The stunt was lambasted by conservative outlet OutKick.

== Results by season ==
Year	League	Division	Finish	W	L	Win %	GB	Postseason	Manager
2016	GWL		3rd	32	25	.561	8	Did Not Qualify	J.J. Altobelli
2017	GWL		4th	31	29	.517	9	Lost Semifinal (Rogues)	Jeff Lahti
2018	WCL	South	1st	37	17	.685	--	Lost Division Series 0–2 (Knights)	Justin Barchus
2019	WCL	South	4th	24	29	.453	17.5	Did Not Qualify	Justin Barchus
2020	WWWL (Note: Due to the cancellation of 2020 West Coast League season, the Pickles founded and played in the Wild Wild West League during 2020)		2nd	8	8	.500		Won Semifinal (GreyWolves); Lost Championship (Knights)	Justin Barchus
2021	WCL	South	3rd	26	22	.542	11	Did Not Qualify	Justin Barchus (Until June 8), Mark Magdaleno
2022	WCL	South	2nd	36	16	.692	2	Lost South Divisional Series 0–2 (Raptors)	Mark Magdaleno
2023	WCL	South	4th	28	26	.519	11	Won South Divisional Series 2–0 (Raptors); Lost South Division Championship Game 1–4 (at Knights)	Mark Magdaleno
2024	WCL	South	2nd	44	14	.759	1	Won South Divisional Series 2–0 (Elks); Won South Division Championship Game 4–1 (at Knights); Won WCL Championship Game 6–5 (AppleSox)	Mark Magdaleno
2025	WCL	South	1st	43	11	.796	–	Won South Divisional Series 2–0 (Berries); Won South Division Championship Game 6–5 (Knights); Lost WCL Championship Game 1–2 (Bells)	Mark Magdaleno
2026	WCL	South	4th	29	25	.537	2	Lost South Division Series 1-2 (Ridgefield)	Jim Hoppel

League champions	Division champions	Playoff Team

== All-Star Game selections ==
Year	Players	Ref
2018	Zander Clarke, Joey Cooper, Gio Diaz, Brad McVay, Michael Newstrom, Connor Pellerin	
2019	Titus Groeneweg, Conner Thurman	
2020	2020 WCL Season cancelled due to coronavirus pandemic	
2024	Tanner Griffith, Patrick Keighran, Freddie Rodriguez, Shay Timmer	
2025	Ryder Edwards, Zachary Fechtel, Kyle McDaniel, Josh Schleichardt, Dylan Smith Petey Soho, Jr., Aiden Taurek	

== Hall of Fame ==
- Kyle Manzardo, Cleveland Guardians player
- Bobby Kinne, Cleveland Guardians Director of Baseball Operations

== See also ==
- Portland Bangers FC
- Portland Cherry Bombs FC
