= Lents Park =

Public park in Portland, Oregon, U.S.

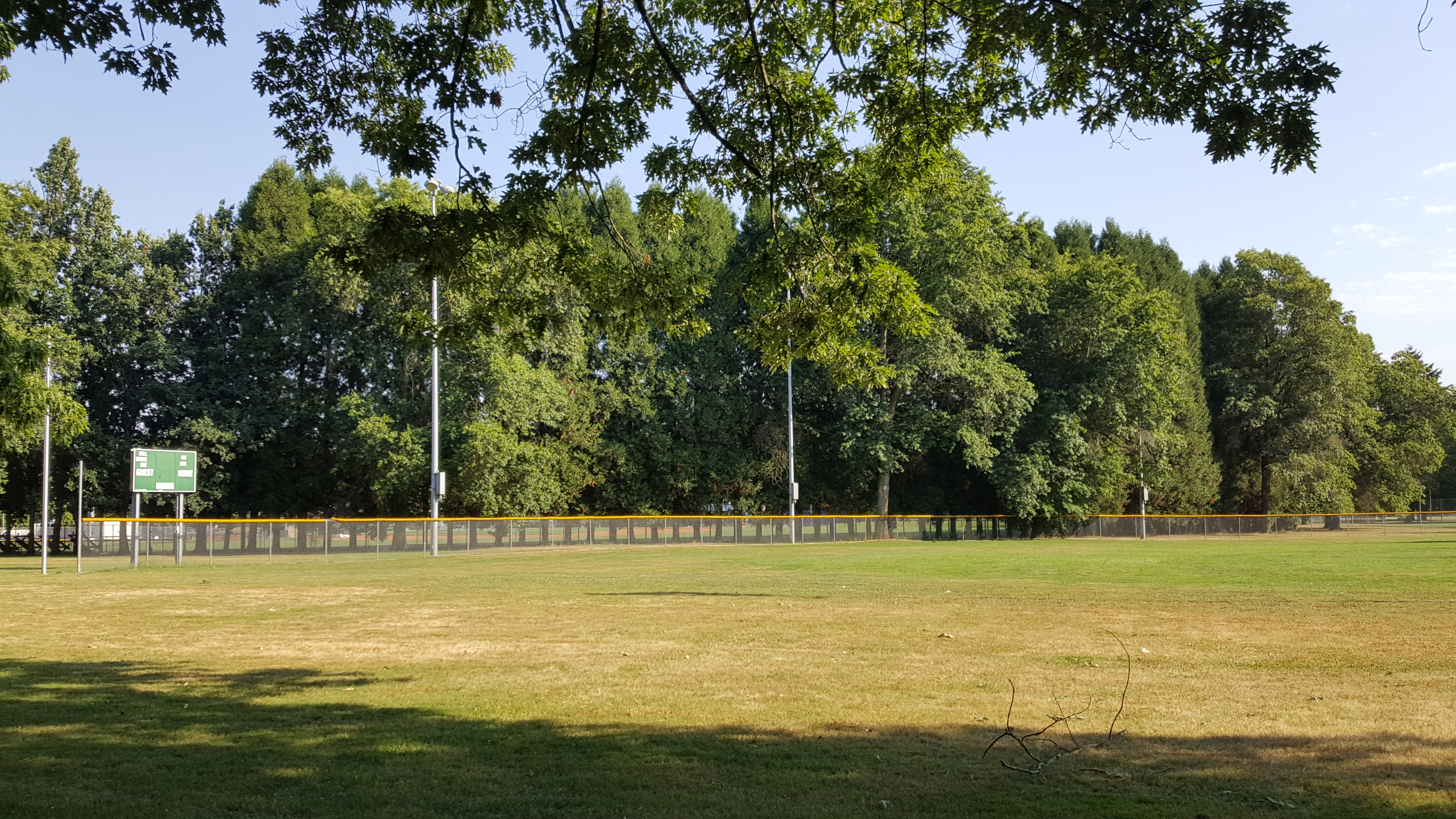
- The park in 2020
- Interactive map of Lents Park
- Location: SE 92nd Ave. and Holgate Blvd. Portland, Oregon
- Coordinates: 45°29′14″N 122°34′14″W
- Area: 38.07 acres (15.41 ha)
- Established: 1914
- Operator: Portland Parks & Recreation
- Public transit: SE Holgate Blvd; 17, 10

Lents Park is a 38.07-acre (15.41 ha) public park in southeast Portland, Oregon's Lents neighborhood, in the United States. Acquired in 1914, the park features the Charles B. Walker Stadium (home of the West Coast League's Portland Pickles collegiate baseball team), and has a new playground to replace one built in the 1970s.

Lents Park was the site of at least one Black Lives Matter demonstration in 2020.

In April 2021, a man was shot in the park by the police that responded to multiple calls about a man with a gun. A replica gun was recovered.

== See also ==
- List of parks in Portland, Oregon
