= Walker Stadium (baseball) =

Baseball stadium in Portland, Oregon

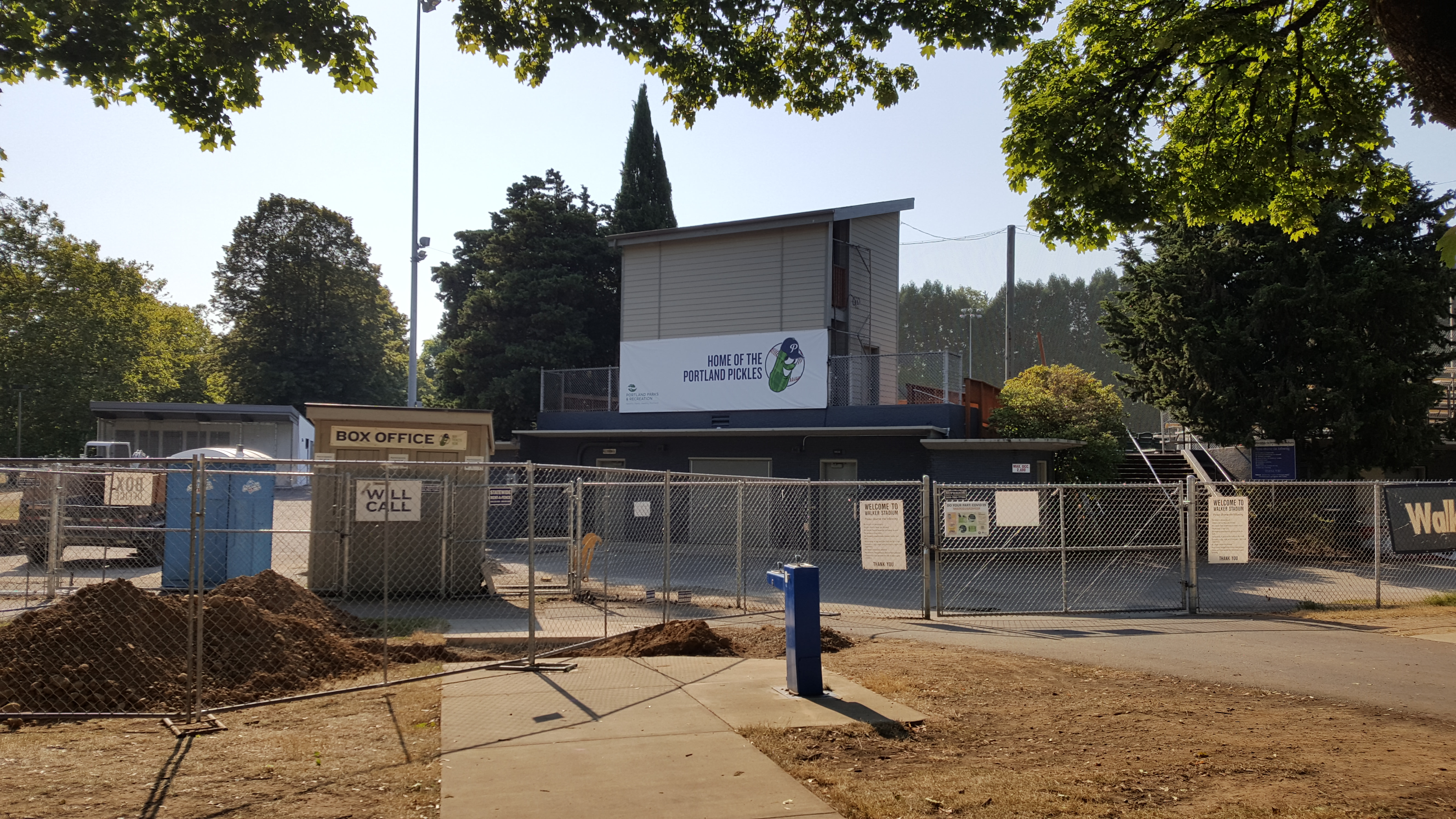
- Part of the stadium in July 2020, during the COVID-19 pandemic
- Interactive map of Walker Stadium
- Full name: Charles B. Walker Stadium at Lents Park
- Location: 4601, 4727 SE 92nd Ave; Portland, OR 97266
- Coordinates: 45.48846°N 122.56975°W
- Owner: City of Portland
- Operator: Portland Parks & Recreation
- Capacity: 1,566
- Surface: Grass
- Field size: Left – 309 ft. Left Center – 355 ft. Center – 400 ft. Right Center - 357 ft. Right – 310 ft.
- Public transit: SE Holgate Blvd; 17

Construction
- Opened: 1956
- Renovated: 2016

Tenant
- Portland Pickles (WCL) (2016–present)

Charles B. Walker Stadium at Lents Park is a baseball stadium located in Lents Park in the Lents neighborhood of Portland, Oregon. It has been home to the West Coast League Portland Pickles baseball team since 2016. The Pickles play thirty home games per sixty game season. The team pays rent to the City, cleans the stadium, and provides security during games. Outside of the dates set aside for the team, the stadium is open for permitted play by anyone who reserves it. The Northwest Independent Baseball League plays many of its games at Walker Stadium.

The ballpark has hosted as many as 4,387 fans for a Pickles game.

== History ==
The City of Portland purchased 32 acres from private owners in the 1940s and 1950s to assemble land between SE 88th Ave, SE 92nd Ave, SE Holgate Blvd and SE Steele St to expand Lents Park. The city prepared a central plan in 1953 to propose locations for a baseball stadium, playing fields, tennis courts, community buildings, pathways, and parking areas. Construction on the stadium began in 1956 and included lights for night games. The stadium was named for Charles B. Walker, the city's first Sports Director in 1935 who helped organize the first men's and women's softball tournaments held west of the Mississippi, and in 1950 was appointed as commissioner of the Amateur Softball Association (ASA) for the Portland area.

In 2008, Merritt Paulson, owner of the Portland Beavers examined building an 8,000 to 9,000 seat minor league ballpark on the site of Walker Stadium for $45 million. Paulson planned to begin construction in March 2010, and the Beavers would play there in 2011. The location was eventually rejected for the Beavers due to objections from neighbors.

== 2016 Renovation ==
In March 2015, Portland and Great West League officials announced plans to renovate the stadium, adding 500 seats and concessions and complementing the city's urban renewal goals for the Lents neighborhood. Walker Stadium was supposed to have received upgrades as part of a 1994 bond measure but other municipal projects competed for limited funding.

Under the plans, the public-private partnership of the Portland Pickles, Portland Parks & Recreation, and the Portland Development Commission spent $650,000 to upgrade the city-owned ballpark with Portland's urban renewal agency paying $200,000, the parks bureau $50,000, and the baseball team $400,000. The renovations included new seating with chair-backs, new scoreboard, new dugouts, new grass, a playground, and other improvements. The team agreed to pay $200 per-game in rent with payments beginning in 2016 and annual 3.5 percent increases.

The renovation was completed in June 2016 on schedule for the Pickles' first game. Portland Mayor Charlie Hales threw out the first pitch at the first game at Walker Stadium on June 10, 2016, an extra-inning loss to the Marysville Gold Sox.
