= 2019 Arizona Wildcats baseball team =

2019 Arizona Wildcats baseball
- Conference: Pac-12 Conference
- Record: 32–24 (15–14 Pac-12)
- Head coach: Jay Johnson (4th season)
- Assistant coaches: Sergio Brown (4th season); Dave Lawn (4th season); Marc Wanaka (4th season)
- Home stadium: Hi Corbett Field

The 2019 Arizona Wildcats baseball team represented the University of Arizona in the 2019 NCAA Division I baseball season. The Wildcats played their home games for the 8th season at Hi Corbett Field. The team was coached by Jay Johnson in his 4th season at Arizona.

== Personnel ==
=== Roster ===
2019 Pac-12 Conference baseball standings
	Conf.						Overall
Team	W		L		T	PCT	W		L		T	PCT
No. 7 UCLA ‍†‍‍^{y}	24	–	5	–	0	.828	52	–	11	–	0	.825
No. 10 Stanford ‍‍‍^{y}	22	–	7	–	0	.759	45	–	14	–	0	.763
Oregon State ‍‍‍^{y}	21	–	8	–	0	.724	36	–	20	–	1	.640
California ‍‍‍^{y}	17	–	11	–	0	.607	32	–	20	–	0	.615
Arizona State ‍‍‍^{y}	16	–	13	–	0	.552	38	–	19	–	0	.667
Arizona ‍‍‍	15	–	14	–	0	.517	32	–	24	–	0	.571
USC ‍‍‍	13	–	15	–	1	.466	25	–	29	–	1	.464
Washington ‍‍‍	12	–	17	–	0	.414	28	–	24	–	0	.538
Oregon ‍‍‍	10	–	19	–	0	.345	27	–	29	–	0	.482
Utah ‍‍‍	6	–	24	–	0	.200	16	–	33	–	0	.327
Washington State ‍‍‍	3	–	25	–	1	.121	11	–	41	–	1	.217
† – Conference champion y – Invited to the NCAA tournament As of July 16, 2019; Rankings from D1Baseball

2019 Arizona Wildcats roster
Pitchers • 4 – Gil Luna – Sophomore • 6 – Ian Mejia – Freshman • 14 – Jonathan Guardado – Sophomore • 15 – Nate Brown – Junior • 17 – Randy Labaut – Junior • 18 – Andrew Nardi – Junior • 19 – Zach Sherman – Sophomore • 21 – Bryce Collins – Freshman • 26 – Vince Vannelle – Junior • 27 – Avery Weems – Senior • 30 – Preston Price – Junior • 31 – Cameron Haskell – Senior • 36 – George Arias Jr. – Freshman • 40 – Quinn Flanagan – Freshman • 50 – Blake Peyton – Freshman • 99 – Randy Abshier – Freshman	Catchers • 1 – Kobe Kato – Freshman • 5 – Matthew Dyer – Sophomore • 16 – Austin Wells – Freshman Infielders • 3 – Tony Bullard – Freshman • 8 – Dayton Dooney – Freshman • 10 – Jacob Blas – Sophomore • 13 – Nick Quintana – Junior • 24 – Bryce Begell – Freshman • 29 – Kyson Donahue – Freshman • 35 – Cameron Cannon – Junior • 38 – Ryan Archibald – Freshman	Outfielders • 12 – Justin Wylie – Senior • 22 – Matt Fraizer – Junior • 23 – Donta Williams – Sophomore • 25 – Tyler Casagrande – Freshman • 28 – Blake Paugh – Sophomore • 33 – Tate Soderstrom – Sophomore • 42 – Ryan Holgate – Freshman • 45 – Branden Boissiere – Freshman

=== Coaches ===
2019 Arizona Wildcats baseball coaching staff
- Jay Johnson – Head coach
- Sergio Brown – Assistant coach
- Dave Lawn – Assistant coach
- Marc Wanaka – Volunteer Assistant Coach

=== Opening day ===
Opening Day Starters
Name	Position
Matt Fraizer	Center fielder
Cameron Cannon	Shortstop
Ryan Holgate	Designated hitter
Nick Quintana	Third baseman
Austin Wells	First baseman
Matthew Dyer	Catcher
Donta Williams	Left fielder
Branden Boissiere	Right fielder
Jacob Blas	Second baseman
Randy Labaut	Starting pitcher

== Schedule and results ==
2019 Arizona Wildcats baseball game log
Regular season
Date	Opponent	Rank	Site/Stadium	Score	Win	Loss	Save	Overall Record	Pac-12 Record
Feb 15	vs UMass Lowell		Hi Corbett Field • Tucson, AZ	W 12–4	Labaut (1–0)	Rand (0–1)	Haskell (1)	1–0	
Feb 16	vs UMass Lowell		Hi Corbett Field • Tucson, AZ	W 18–4	Nardi (1–0)	Funaro (0–1)	Abshier (1)	2–0	
Feb 16	vs UMass Lowell		Hi Corbett Field • Tucson, AZ	W 19–4	Vannelle (1–0)	Metelski (0–1)	None	3–0	
Feb 17	vs UMass Lowell		Hi Corbett Field • Tucson, AZ	W 20–5	Flanagan (1–0)	Fusco (0–1)	None	4–0	
Feb 20	at Rice		Reckling Park • Houston, TX	W 16–5	Weems (1–0)	Bordwine (0–1)	None	5–0	
Feb 22	at Houston		Schroeder Park • Houston, TX	L 1–2	Villarreal (1–0)	Labaut (1–1)	None	5–1	
Feb 23	at Houston		Schroeder Park • Houston, TX	L 7–9	Randel (1–0)	Nardi (1–1)	None	5–2	
Feb 24	at Houston		Schroeder Park • Houston, TX	W 9–4	Sherman (1–0)	Lockhart Jr. (0–1)	None	6–2	
Feb 27	vs New Mexico		Hi Corbett Field • Tucson, AZ	L 4–5	White (1–0)	Nardi (1–2)	Emond (3)	6 -3	
Mar 1	vs Milwaukee		Hi Corbett Field • Tucson, AZ	W 14–6	Brown (1–0)	Reklaitis (1–2)	None	7–3	
Mar 2	vs Milwaukee		Hi Corbett Field • Tucson, AZ	L 4–10	McIntosh (1–0)	Collins (0–1)	Tomfohrde (1)	7–4	
Mar 3	vs Milwaukee		Hi Corbett Field • Tucson, AZ	W 12–11	Luna (1–0)	Sommers (0–1)	None	8–4	
Mar 5	vs Michigan State		Hi Corbett Field • Tucson, AZ	L 5–9	Panaranto (1–0)	Luna (1–1)	None	8–5	
Mar 8	vs College of Charleston		Hi Corbett Field • Tucson, AZ	W 7–5	Weems (2–0)	McLarty (2–2)	Collins (1)	9–5	
Mar 9	vs College of Charleston		Hi Corbett Field • Tucson, AZ	W 7–5	Flanagan (2–0)	Williams (0–1)	Arias Jr. (1)	10–5	
Mar 10	vs College of Charleston		Hi Corbett Field • Tucson, AZ	L 6–10	Price (3–1)	Nardi (1–3)	Ocker (3)	10–6	
Mar 12	vs Xavier		Hi Corbett Field • Tucson, AZ	Cancelled	–	–	–	–	
Mar 15	vs Utah		Hi Corbett Field • Tucson, AZ	L 10–21	Robeniol (1–1)	Weems (2–1)	None	10–7	0–1
Mar 16	vs Utah		Hi Corbett Field • Tucson, AZ	W 8–0	Flanagan (3–0)	Pierce (1–3)	None	11–7	1–1
Mar 17	vs Utah		Hi Corbett Field • Tucson, AZ	W 18–7	Labaut (2–1)	Tedeschi (3–1)	None	12–7	2–1
Mar 19	vs New Mexico State		Hi Corbett Field • Tucson, AZ	W 14–10	Abshier (1–0)	Barraza (0–1)	None	13–7	
Mar 22	at #1 UCLA		Jackie Robinson Stadium • Los Angeles, CA	L 5–10	Pettway (2–1)	Labaut (2–2)	None	13–8	2–2
Mar 23	at #1 UCLA		Jackie Robinson Stadium • Los Angeles, CA	L 10–12	Mora (2–1)	Collins (0–2)	Powell (7)	13–9	2–3
Mar 24	at #1 UCLA		Jackie Robinson Stadium • Los Angeles, CA	L 1–3	Powell (1–2)	Sherman (1–1)	None	13–10	2–4
Mar 25	at San Diego State		Tony Gwynn Stadium • San Diego, CA	L 4–6	Ritcheson (1–0)	Weems (2–2)	None	13–11	
Mar 29	at #9 Arizona State		Phoenix Municipal Stadium • Phoenix, AZ	L 2–8	Marsh (7–0)	Labaut (2–3)	Corrigan (1)	13–12	2–5
Mar 30	at #9 Arizona State		Phoenix Municipal Stadium • Phoenix, AZ	L 3–8	Vander Kooi (3–0)	Flanagan (3–1)	Romero (2)	13–13	2–6
Mar 31	at #9 Arizona State		Phoenix Municipal Stadium • Phoenix, AZ	L 16–17	Romero (2–0)	Weems (2–3)	None	13–14	2–7
Apr 5	vs Washington		Hi Corbett Field • Tucson, AZ	W 9–3	Labaut (3–3)	Rhodes (4–3)	Vannelle (1)	14–14	3–7
Apr 6	vs Washington		Hi Corbett Field • Tucson, AZ	W 14–2	Flanagan (4–1)	Jones (2–3)	None	15–14	4–7
Apr 7	vs Washington		Hi Corbett Field • Tucson, AZ	W 7–4	Nardi (2–3)	Burgmann (3–1)	Weems (1)	16–14	5–7
Apr 9	at Grand Canyon		GCU Ballpark • Phoenix, AZ	W 14–13	Weems (3–3)	Chapman (0–1)	None	17–14	
Apr 12	vs California		Hi Corbett Field • Tucson, AZ	L 7–10	Stoutenborough (6–3)	Vannelle (1–1)	Sullivan (4)	17–15	5–8
Apr 13	vs California		Hi Corbett Field • Tucson, AZ	L 3–7	Horn (2–1)	Flanagan (4–2)	None	17–16	5–9
Apr 14	vs California		Hi Corbett Field • Tucson, AZ	W 4–2	Nardi (3–3)	Holman (2–1)	Weems (2)	18–16	6–9
Apr 18	at #2 Oregon State		Goss Stadium • Corvallis, OR	L 4–8	Pearce (1–0)	Luna (1–2)	None	18–17	6–10
Apr 20	at #2 Oregon State		Goss Stadium • Corvallis, OR	L 3–15	Fehmel (6–0)	Flanagan (4–3)	None	18–18	6–11
Apr 20	at #2 Oregon State		Goss Stadium • Corvallis, OR	L 3–9	Gambrell (3–1)	Nardi (3–4)	None	18–19	6–12
Apr 23	vs Grand Canyon		Hi Corbett Field • Tucson, AZ	L 9–11	Hull (1–2)	Weems (3–4)	Hoskins (3)	18–20	
Apr 26	at #3 Stanford		Sunken Diamond • Stanford, CA	W 6–3	Labaut (3–2)	Beck (3–3)	Flanagan (1)	19–20	7–12
Apr 27	at #3 Stanford		Sunken Diamond • Stanford, CA	L 3–13	Matthiessen (4–1)	Nardi (3–5)	None	19–21	7–13
Apr 28	at #3 Stanford		Sunken Diamond • Stanford, CA	L 5–13	Miller (6–0)	Weems (3–5)	None	19–22	7–14
Apr 30	vs New Mexico State		Hi Corbett Field • Tucson, AZ	L 13–15	Kelley (3–0)	Haskell (0–1)	None	19–23	
May 3	vs Oregon		Hi Corbett Field • Tucson, AZ	W 17–6	Labaut (5–3)	Chase (3–1)	None	20–23	8–14
May 4	vs Oregon		Hi Corbett Field • Tucson, AZ	W 9–8	Luna (2–2)	Nelson (2–4)	None	21–23	9–14
May 5	vs Oregon		Hi Corbett Field • Tucson, AZ	W 28–7	Flanagan (5–3)	Kafka (5–4)	None	22–23	10–14
May 7	vs #22 Arizona State		Hi Corbett Field • Tucson, AZ	L 7–10	Burzell (5–0)	Vanelle (1–2)	Dabovich (3)	22–24	
May 10	vs Southern California		Hi Corbett Field • Tucson, AZ	W 12–4	Labaut (6–3)	Lunn (6–3)	None	23–24	11–14
May 11	vs Southern California		Hi Corbett Field • Tucson, AZ	W 8–5	Flanagan (6–3)	Hurt (1–7)	Vanelle (2)	24–24	12–14
May 12	vs Southern California		Hi Corbett Field • Tucson, AZ	Cancelled	–	–	–	–	–
May 13	vs Sam Houston State		Hi Corbett Field • Tucson, AZ	W 14–7	Weems (4–5)	Backhus (0–1)	None	25–24	
May 13	vs Sam Houston State		Hi Corbett Field • Tucson, AZ	W 16–2	Arias Jr. (1–0)	Cameron (0–1)	None	26–24	
May 16	at Penn State		Medlar Field • State College, PA	W 11–2	Labaut (7–3)	Biasi (3–6)	None	27–24	
May 17	at Penn State		Medlar Field • State College, PA	W 15–5	Nardi (4–5)	Mock (2–4)	None	28–24	
May 18	at Penn State		Medlar Field • State College, PA	W 9–5	Flanagan (7–3)	Hodgens (0–1)	None	29–24	
May 23	at Washington State		Bailey-Brayton Field • Pullman, WA	W 21–4	Labaut (8–3)	Bush (0–5)	None	30–24	13–14
May 24	at Washington State		Bailey-Brayton Field • Pullman, WA	W 10–4	Vannelle (2–2)	Rosenkrantz (2–4)	None	31–24	14–14
May 25	at Washington State		Bailey-Brayton Field • Pullman, WA	W 15–7	Flanagan (8–3)	White (2–8)	None	32–24	15–14

== 2019 MLB draft ==
Player	Position	Round	Overall	MLB team
Cameron Cannon	IF	2	43	Boston Red Sox
Nick Quintana	IF	2	47	Detroit Tigers
Matt Fraizer	OF	3	95	Pittsburgh Pirates
Avery Weems	LHP	6	170	Chicago White Sox
Andrew Nardi	LHP	16	471	Miami Marlins
Randy Labaut	LHP	35	1,060	Cleveland Indians
