= 2018 Arizona Wildcats baseball team =

2018 Arizona Wildcats baseball
- Conference: Pac-12 Conference
- Record: 34–22 (14–16 Pac-12)
- Head coach: Jay Johnson (3rd season)
- Assistant coaches: Sergio Brown (3rd season); Dave Lawn (3rd season); Marc Wanaka (3rd season)
- Home stadium: Hi Corbett Field

The 2018 Arizona Wildcats baseball team represented the University of Arizona in the 2018 NCAA Division I baseball season. The Wildcats played their home games for the 7th season at Hi Corbett Field. The team was coached by Jay Johnson in his 3rd season at Arizona.

== Personnel ==
=== Roster ===
2018 Pac-12 Conference baseball standings
	Conf.						Overall
Team	W		L		T	PCT	W		L		T	PCT
No. 18 Stanford ‍†‍‍^{y}	22	–	8	–	0	.733	46	–	12	–	0	.793
No. 1 Oregon State ‍‍‍^{y}	20	–	9	–	1	.683	55	–	12	–	1	.816
No. 8 Washington ‍‍‍^{y}	20	–	10	–	0	.667	35	–	26	–	0	.574
No. 25 UCLA ‍‍‍^{y}	19	–	11	–	0	.633	38	–	21	–	0	.644
California ‍‍‍	16	–	14	–	0	.533	32	–	22	–	0	.593
Arizona ‍‍‍	14	–	16	–	0	.467	34	–	22	–	0	.607
Arizona State ‍‍‍	13	–	17	–	0	.433	23	–	32	–	0	.418
Southern California ‍‍‍	12	–	18	–	0	.400	26	–	28	–	0	.481
Oregon ‍‍‍	12	–	18	–	0	.400	26	–	29	–	0	.473
Washington State ‍‍‍	8	–	21	–	1	.283	16	–	33	–	1	.330
Utah ‍‍‍	8	–	22	–	0	.267	16	–	39	–	0	.291
† – Conference champion y – Invited to the NCAA tournament As of June 29, 2018; Rankings from Collegiate Baseball

2018 Arizona Wildcats roster
Pitchers: 4 – Gil Luna – Freshman; 14 – Jonathan Guardado – Freshman; 15 – Cody Deason – Junior; 17 – Randy Labaut – Sophomore; 18 – Ryan Gowens – Senior; 19 – Zach Sherman – Freshman; 20 – Roman Phansalkar – Freshman; 21 – Seve Romo – Senior; 23 – Robby Medel – Senior; 26 – Michael Flynn – Junior; 27 – Avery Weems – Junior; 30 – Preston Price – Sophomore; 31 – Cameron Haskell – Junior; 33 – Austin Nichols – Freshman; 34 – Juan Aguilera – Senior; 36 – Tylor Megill – Senior; 40 – Quinn Flanagan – Freshman; 43 – Jason Seever – Senior; 45 – Zach Stone – Senior; 46 – Josh Haley – Freshman	Catchers: 6 – Ryan Haug – Senior; 12 – Cesar Salazar – Junior; 29 – Jake Meyer – Freshman; 37 – Michael Benson – Sophomore; Infielders: 1 – Kobe Kato – Freshman; 5 – Travis Moniot – Junior; 10 – Jacob Blas – Freshman; 13 – Nick Quintana – Sophomore; 35 – Cameron Cannon – Sophomore	Outfielders: 3 – Donta Williams – Freshman; 8 – Cal Stevenson – Senior; 16 – Mitchell Morimoto – Senior; 22 – Matt Fraizer – Sophomore; 25 – Alfonso Rivas III – Junior; 28 – Blake Paugh – Freshman; 44 – Tate Soderstrom – Freshman; Utility: 24 – Matthew Dyer – Sophomore

=== Coaches ===
2018 Arizona Wildcats baseball coaching staff
- Jay Johnson – Head coach
- Sergio Brown – Assistant coach
- Dave Lawn – Assistant coach
- Marc Wanaka – Volunteer Assistant Coach

=== Opening day ===
Opening Day Starters
Name	Position
Cal Stevenson	Center fielder
Alfonso Rivas III	First baseman
Mitchell Morimoto	Left fielder
Cesar Salazar	Catcher
Nick Quintana	Third baseman
Michael Benson	Designated hitter
Cameron Cannon	Second baseman
Matt Fraizer	Right fielder
Travis Moniot	Shortstop
Cody Deason	Starting pitcher

== Schedule and results ==
2018 Arizona Wildcats baseball game log
Regular season
Date	Opponent	Rank	Site/Stadium	Score	Win	Loss	Save	Overall Record	Pac-12 Record
Feb 17	vs Bryant		Hi Corbett Field • Tucson, AZ	W 4–0	Deason (1–0)	Theetge (0–1)	Megill (1)	1–0	
Feb 17	vs Bryant		Hi Corbett Field • Tucson, AZ	W 5–1	Flynn (1–0)	Patterson (0–1)	Medel (1)	2–0	
Feb 18	vs Bryant		Hi Corbett Field • Tucson, AZ	W 10–1	Weems (1–0)	Morgese (0–1)	None	3–0	
Feb 21	vs #4 Arkansas		Tony Gwynn Stadium • San Diego, CA	L 0–1	Murphy (1–0)	Labaut (0–1)	Cronin (1)	3–1	
Feb 23	at San Diego State		Tony Gwynn Stadium • San Diego, CA	L 2–3	Fernandez (1–1)	Megill (0–1)	None	3–2	
Feb 24	vs Michigan		Tony Gwynn Stadium • San Diego, CA	W 9–5	Medel (1–0)	Tribucher (0–1)	Megill (2)	4–2	
Feb 25	at San Diego		Fowler Park • San Diego, CA	L 3–5	Ward (1–0)	Weems (1–1)	Crow (1)	4–3	
Feb 27	vs New Mexico State		Hi Corbett Field • Tucson, AZ	W 5–4	Aguilera (1–0)	Whittlesey (0–2)	Megill (3)	5–3	
Mar 2	at Minnesota		US Bank Stadium • Minneapolis, MN	L 2–3	Schulze (2–0)	Haley (0–1)	None	5–4	
Mar 3	vs Illinois		US Bank Stadium • Minneapolis, MN	L 3–4	Thompson (3–0)	Luna (0–1)	Gerber (3)	5–5	
Mar 4	vs Michigan State		US Bank Stadium • Minneapolis, MN	L 2–3	Mokma (1–1)	Price (0–1)	None	5–6	
Mar 6	vs #25 San Diego State		Hi Corbett Field • Tucson, AZ	W 13–4	Aguilera (2–0)	Goossen-Brown (1–1)	None	6–6	
Mar 9	vs North Dakota State		Hi Corbett Field • Tucson, AZ	W 13–3	Deason (2–0)	Johnson (2–2)	None	7–6	
Mar 10	vs North Dakota State		Hi Corbett Field • Tucson, AZ	W 9–4	Flynn (2–0)	Stockert (1–1)	None	8–6	
Mar 11	vs North Dakota State		Hi Corbett Field • Tucson, AZ	W 11–2	Labaut (1–1)	Harms (1–1)	None	9–6	
Mar 13	at Arizona State		Phoenix Municipal Stadium • Phoenix, AZ	W 6–2	Price (1–1)	Marsh (2–1)	Megill (4)	10–6	
Mar 16	at Washington		Husky Ballpark • Seattle, WA	L 1–7	Lamb (1–0)	Deason (2–1)	None	10–7	0–1
Mar 17	at Washington		Husky Ballpark • Seattle, WA	L 0–1	Emanuels (3–1)	Flynn (2–1)	None	10–8	0–2
Mar 18	at Washington		Husky Ballpark • Seattle, WA	L 2–3	Emanuels (4–1)	Megill (0–2)	None	10–9	0–3
Mar 20	vs New Mexico State		Hi Corbett Field • Tucson, AZ	W 14–0	Aguilera (3–0)	Perea (0–2)	None	11–9	
Mar 23	vs Washington State		Hi Corbett Field • Tucson, AZ	W 5–4	Deason (3–1)	Block (0–3)	Megill (5)	12–9	1–3
Mar 24	vs Washington State		Hi Corbett Field • Tucson, AZ	L 4–5	Sunitsch (2–1)	Weems (1–2)	Walker (2)	12–10	1–4
Mar 25	vs Washington State		Hi Corbett Field • Tucson, AZ	W 9–2	Flynn (3–1)	Anderson (1–4)	None	13–10	2–4
Mar 29	vs Nicholls		Hi Corbett Field • Tucson, AZ	W 11–3	Medel (2–0)	Bedevian (0–5)	None	14–10	
Mar 30	vs Nicholls		Hi Corbett Field • Tucson, AZ	W 11–5	Guardado (1–0)	Bahlinger (1–1)	None	15–10	
Mar 31	vs Nicholls		Hi Corbett Field • Tucson, AZ	W 9–3	Flynn (4–1)	Hatcher (1–3)	None	16–10	
Apr 2	at New Mexico		Santa Ana Star Field • Albuquerque, NM	W 16–6	Sherman (1–0)	Harrington (0–1)	None	17–10	
Apr 6	vs #4 Oregon State		Hi Corbett Field • Tucson, AZ	L 2–6	Fehmel (4–1)	Deason (3–2)	Mulholland (9)	17–11	2–5
Apr 7	vs #4 Oregon State		Hi Corbett Field • Tucson, AZ	W 15–4	Flynn (5–1)	Heimlich (7–1)	None	18–11	3–5
Apr 8	vs #4 Oregon State		Hi Corbett Field • Tucson, AZ	W 6–5	Megill (1–2)	Mulholland (1–1)	None	19–11	4–5
Apr 10	at Grand Canyon		GCU Ballpark • Phoenix, AZ	W 16–1	Aguilera (4–0)	Hull (0–1)	None	20–11	
Apr 13	at Southern California		Dedeaux Field • Los Angeles, CA	W 14–2	Deason (4–2)	Hurt (2–3)	Medel (2)	21–11	5–5
Apr 14	at Southern California		Dedeaux Field • Los Angeles, CA	L 2–12	Bates (3–1)	Flynn (5–2)	None	21–12	5–6
Apr 15	at Southern California		Dedeaux Field • Los Angeles, CA	W 4–2	Sherman (2–0)	Longrie (4–2)	Megill (6)	22–12	6–6
Apr 17	vs BYU		Hi Corbett Field • Tucson, AZ	W 6–1	Aguilera (5–0)	Wood (2–4)	None	23–12	
Apr 20	vs #2 Stanford		Hi Corbett Field • Tucson, AZ	L 2–8	Beck (5–2)	Deason (4–3)	None	23–13	6–7
Apr 21	vs #2 Stanford		Hi Corbett Field • Tucson, AZ	L 7–8	Bakst (1–0)	Megill (1–3)	Beck (1)	23–14	6–8
Apr 22	vs #2 Stanford		Hi Corbett Field • Tucson, AZ	L 2–7	Miller (3–2)	Weems (1–3)	None	23–15	6–9
Apr 27	at Utah		Smith's Ballpark • Salt Lake City, UT	L 4–5	Thomas (3–2)	Deason (4–4)	Stoltz (5)	23–16	6–10
Apr 28	at Utah		Smith's Ballpark • Salt Lake City, UT	L 2–3	Tedeschi (1–7)	Flynn (5–3)	Stoltz (6)	23–17	6–11
Apr 29	at Utah		Smith's Ballpark • Salt Lake City, UT	W 18–12	Stone (1–0)	Brocoff (2–7)	None	24–17	7–11
Apr 30	at Utah Valley		UCCU Ballpark • Orem, UT	W 7–6	Haley (1–1)	Briones (0–1)	Weems (1)	25–17	
May 3	vs #7 UCLA		Hi Corbett Field • Tucson, AZ	W 2–0	Deason (5–4)	Bird (5–3)	None	26–17	8–11
May 4	vs #7 UCLA		Hi Corbett Field • Tucson, AZ	W 3–1	Flynn (6–3)	Pettway (7–2)	Stone (1)	27–17	9–11
May 5	vs #7 UCLA		Hi Corbett Field • Tucson, AZ	W 6–3	Aguilera (6–0)	Garcia (5–1)	None	28–17	10–11
May 8	vs Grand Canyon		Hi Corbett Field • Tucson, AZ	W 20–6	Price (2–1)	Zmuda (2–2)	None	29–17	
May 11	at California		Evans Diamond • Berkeley, CA	L 3–9	Ladrech (7–4)	Deason (5–5)	Dodson (11)	29–18	10–12
May 12	at California		Evans Diamond • Berkeley, CA	L 6–16	Sabouri (4–2)	Stone (1–1)	None	29–19	10–13
May 13	at California		Evans Diamond • Berkeley, CA	L 11–12	Shortridge (4–2)	Aguilera (6–1)	None	29–20	10–14
May 14	at Sacramento State		John Smith Field • Sacramento, CA	W 5–2	Stone (2–1)	Fox (1–5)	Sherman (1)	30–20	
May 17	vs Arizona State		Hi Corbett Field • Tucson, AZ	W 6–4	Weems (2–3)	Montoya (1–7)	Stone (2)	31–20	11–14
May 18	vs Arizona State		Hi Corbett Field • Tucson, AZ	L 5–10	Higgins (2–2)	Flynn (6–4)	Corrigan (1)	31–21	11–15
May 19	vs Arizona State		Hi Corbett Field • Tucson, AZ	W 10–9	Stone (3–1)	Vander Kooi (3–3)	None	32–21	12–15
May 24	at Oregon		PK Park • Eugene, OR	W 10–2	Deason (6–5)	Kafka (3–2)	None	33–21	13–15
May 25	at Oregon		PK Park • Eugene, OR	L 1–2	Yovan (6–4)	Flynn (6–5)	None	33–22	13–16
May 26	at Oregon		PK Park • Eugene, OR	W 11–4	Labaut (2–1)	Mercer (5–7)	None	34–22	14–16

== 2018 MLB draft ==
Player	Position	Round	Overall	MLB team
Alfonso Rivas	1B	4	113	Oakland Athletics
Cody Deason	RHP	5	162	Houston Astros
Michael Flynn	RHP	6	174	Pittsburgh Pirates
Cesar Salazar	C	7	222	Houston Astros
Tylor Megill	RHP	8	230	New York Mets
Cal Stevenson	CF	10	296	Toronto Blue Jays
Travis Moniot	SS	17	498	Chicago White Sox
Ryan Haug	C	27	804	Pittsburgh Pirates
