= José Bautista (pitcher) =

Dominican baseball player (born 1964)

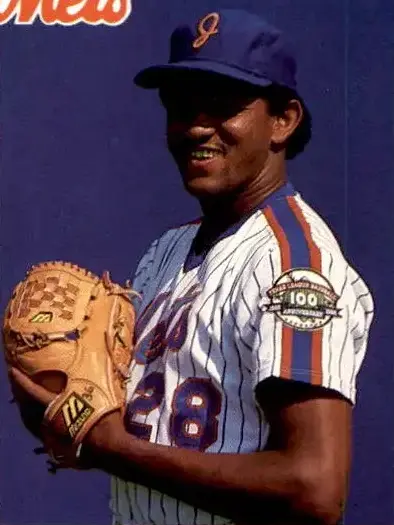
- Bautista with the Jackson Mets c. 1987
- Pitcher
- Born: July 26, 1964 (age 62); Baní, Dominican Republic
- Batted: Right Threw: Right

MLB debut
- April 9, 1988, for the Baltimore Orioles

Last MLB appearance
- September 25, 1997, for the St. Louis Cardinals

MLB statistics
- Win–loss record: 32–42
- Earned run average: 4.62
- Strikeouts: 328
- Stats at Baseball Reference

Teams
- As player: Baltimore Orioles (1988–1991); Chicago Cubs (1993–1994); San Francisco Giants (1995–1996); Detroit Tigers (1997); St. Louis Cardinals (1997); As coach / manager: Burlington Bees (Pitching coach) (2001–2002); Idaho Falls Chukars (Pitching coach) (2004–2006); Burlington Royals (Pitching coach) (2007); Great Falls Voyagers (Manager) (2008–2009); Chicago White Sox (Roving instructor) (2010); Kannapolis Intimidators (Pitching coach) (2011–2015; 2018-2020); Winston-Salem Dash (Pitching coach) (2016); Birmingham Barons (Pitching coach) (2017); Kamloops NorthPaws (Pitching coach) (2022–2023); Kamloops NorthPaws (Manager) (2024)

José Joaquín Bautista Arias (born July 26, 1964) is a Dominican-born former right-handed pitcher who played nine seasons in Major League Baseball (MLB) from 1988 to 1997, pitching for five major league teams. He subsequently coached and managed baseball teams for the next two decades.

== Early and personal life ==
Bautista was born in Baní, in the Dominican Republic on July 26, 1964, to Joaquín and Gloria (Arias) Bautista. He is observantly Jewish, keeps kosher, and was born to a Dominican father and a Jewish Israeli mother. He was bar mitzvah, and said that he not show up at the ballpark on Jewish High Holy Days. His mother's family was originally from Russia, as is the family of his wife Lea Robitschek, who is also Jewish and was born in Caracas, Venezuela. Because of his pride in his Jewish identity, Bautista has expressed a strong desire to eventually manage or serve as a pitching coach for the Israel national baseball team. As of 2021, he and his wife lived in Pembroke Pines, Florida.

== Baseball career ==
Bautista was signed by the New York Mets as an amateur free agent in April 1981 for a $2,000 signing bonus, and was noted by the Mets for his excellent control. In 1984 he was 13–4 (6th in the league in wins) with a 3.13 earned run average (ERA), 3 shutouts, 5 complete games, and a 1.156 WHIP (2nd) for the Columbia Mets in the South Atlantic League.

In 1985, Bautista was 15–8 (2nd in the league in wins) with a 2.34 ERA and 3 shutouts (5th) that included a 7-inning no-hitter, 7 complete games (3rd), 1.8 walks per 9 innings (leading the league), and a 1.053 WHIP (2nd) for the Lynchburg Mets in the Carolina League.

In 1987 for the Jackson Mets, Bautista was 10-5 with a 3.24 ERA, 2 complete games, one shutout (5th in the Texas League), and a 1.281 WHIP (5th).

Bautista pitched for seven years in the New York Mets system, before being selected second overall by the Baltimore Orioles in the December 1987 Rule 5 draft, the team's first Rule 5 selection in a decade.

He joined the Orioles rotation in 1988, and as a 23-year-old in his rookie season Bautista went 6–15 with 76 strikeouts and a 4.30 ERA in a team-leading 171 2/3 innings pitched, including 25 starts and three complete games. The team was 54-107, and he had the worst run-support in the majors in 1988, 2.72 runs per start. In August, he had an AL-best 1.79 ERA. His best pitch, his forkball, had such a hard break that Orioles catcher Terry Kennedy didn't catch 15 of his last 16 starts, because of his difficulty putting his glove on it. On defense, he was third in the American League in putouts, with 27.

Bautista holds the MLB record for fewest pitches in a complete game of 8 innings or more. He threw 70 pitches in a 1-0 Orioles loss to the Seattle Mariners on September 30, 1988. He pitched four years for the Orioles, plagued at times by a bad back.

He then moved to the Chicago Cubs (1993–94). Bautista resurfaced as a relief pitcher with the Cubs in 1993, going 10–3 with two saves and a 2.82 ERA and 111 2/3 innings in 58 appearances (7 as a starter), with a 1.182 WHIP. He kept batters to a .193 batting average in games that were late and close. He later recalled, "They used to tell me I had an elastic arm because I could throw every day and not get hurt. Once in a while, I’d get hurt, but I’d still pitch." He went 4–5 with a 3.89 ERA for the Chicago Cubs in 1994, while pitching in 58 games (second in the National League).

Bautista then pitched with the San Francisco Giants the next two years (1995–96). In September 1996, examined as he was experiencing numbness and the feeling of cold in his right index finger, he was diagnosed with an axillary artery aneurysm in his throwing shoulder and a blood clot in his pitching hand. He was hospitalized for a week, and some doctors predicted that he would never pitch again.

He played in 1997 with the Detroit Tigers and the St. Louis Cardinals in his last Major League season.

In a nine-season career, Bautista posted a 32–42 record with 328 strikeouts and a 4.04 ERA in 312 games, including three saves, 49 starts, 4 complete games, and 685 2/3 innings pitched.

Through 2010,Bautista was fifth all-time in career games pitched (312; directly behind Steve Stone) among Jewish major league baseball players.

== Coaching and managing career ==
Bautista began his coaching career in the minor leagues as the pitching coach for the Kansas City Royals' Burlington Bees in 2001–02. He went on to serve as the pitching coach for the Royals' Idaho Falls Chukars in 2004–06, and the Royals' Burlington Royals in 2007.

He also managed the Great Falls Voyagers, advanced A rookie team of the Chicago White Sox in 2008 and 2009, and was a roving pitching instructor for Latin players in the White Sox farm system in 2010. From 2011 to 2020, Bautista was the pitching coach for the Kannapolis Intimidators, an A-ball affiliate of the White Sox, other than in 2016 when he was the pitching coach for the Winston-Salem Dash, and in 2017 when he was the pitching coach for the Birmingham Barons.

Moving to collegiate summer baseball, Bautista was the pitching coach for the Kamloops NorthPaws of the West Coast League for the 2022 and 2023 seasons. He was promoted to head coach for 2024.

== See also ==
- List of Jewish Major League Baseball players
- List of Major League Baseball players from Dominican Republic
- Maddux (statistic)
