= Wenatchee AppleSox =

Collegiate summer baseball team

- Logo

Information
- League: West Coast League (North)
- Location: Wenatchee, Washington
- Ballpark: Paul Thomas Sr. Field
- Founded: 2000
- League championships: PIL: 2003; WCL: 2005, 2006, 2009, 2010, 2012, 2026
- Division championships: PIL: 2002, 2004; WCL: 2005, 2008, 2009, 2010, 2012, 2013, 2024, 2026
- Former league: PIL
- Colors: Blue and red
- Mascot: AppleSox Coyote
- Ownership: José Oglesby
- Management: Allie Schank
- Coach: Mitchell Darlington (2021 - current)
- Media: KCSY-FM
- Website: applesox.com

The Wenatchee AppleSox is a collegiate summer baseball team playing in the West Coast League's North Division. The team is based in Wenatchee, Washington and was established in 2000 by owner Jim Corcoran. It has played its home games at Paul Thomas Sr. Field on the campus of Wenatchee Valley College. Asst. GM Ken Osborne became a stockholder in 2008. Corcoran and Osborne sold the team to retired Microsoft executive Jose Oglesby in 2018, with Osborne being appointed COO/GM. Osborne stepped down on February 3, 2021, and assistant general manager Allie Schank was promoted to general manager.

Originally founded in 2000, the AppleSox played in the Pacific International League. During their time in the PIL, the AppleSox won the league's championship in 2003. Following the 2004 season, the AppleSox left the league and became a founding member of the West Coast League.

The AppleSox were the most successful franchise in the early years of the league, six division titles and five league championships. Following the departure of head coach Ed Knaggs, the AppleSox faced a dark period that only saw one playoff appearance (2019). The team has seen a resurgence since the hiring of current general manager Allie Schank and head coach Mitch Darlington. Since 2022, the AppleSox have claimed one WCL championship (2026), two division championships (2024 and 2026), two first-half championship (2024 and 2026), two second half championships (2024 and 2026), eight playoff wins (2022, 2024, 2025, and 2026) and five straight playoff appearances.

== Team history ==
=== 2000–2013 ===
The AppleSox began playing in 2000 and joined the Pacific International League. They marked the return of baseball to the Wenatchee Valley for the first time since the Wenatchee Chiefs suspended operations after the 1965 season. A member of the PIL until 2004, they left the former to become a charter member of the West Coast League. The team won the PIL Championship in 2003 and has won five WCL Championships in the league's history, including back-to-back titles in 2009 and 2010.

=== 2014 ===
The 2014 season marked the first year AppleSox did not make the WCL Playoffs. The team got 30–24 in regular-season play. As the season concluded, Sox head coach, Ed Knaggs stepped down and AJ Proszek was selected to replace him, making Proszek the 3rd head coach all-time for the AppleSox. Proszek was a pitching coach for Wenatchee in 2013 and 2014. The changing of the coaching reins put an end to the 14-year run for Knaggs as the head coach in Wenatchee. He also had previously coached 22 seasons at Wenatchee High School.

=== 2015–2016 ===
The AppleSox went 43–65 over the next two WCL seasons, and were unable to reach the WCL postseason. They did feature two of the more prolific hitters in WCL history in each of the 2015 season and 2016 seasons. Keston Hiura, an outfielder from UC Irvine, set WCL records with 33 extra-base hits, 119 total bases, and 6 triples. Michael Toglia (2016) became the third AppleSox player to win league MVP, joining Mitchell Gunsolus (2012) and Steve Marquardt (2005). He hit .306 and led the WCL with 7 home runs. At the end of the 2016 season, A J Proszek announced that he would not return for a third season as the team's head coach. The team hired Kyle Krustangel just over a month later, on September 14, 2016.

=== 2017–2019 ===
Krustangel kept the AppleSox in playoff contention until the final weekend in each of its first two seasons, before finally breaking through in 2019. The AppleSox won 17 of their final 25 games and earned their first playoff spot since 2013. Krustangel quit following the 2019 season to accept the same job with the Yakima Valley Pippins. Ian Sanderson of Lower Columbia College was subsequently hired as the fifth head coach in AppleSox history.

=== 2022 ===
The AppleSox made the postseason for the first time under a first-year head coach in 2022 after winning the WCL North Division's second-half title. Mitch Darlington guided the team to a 27-27 record and a first-round sweep of the Kamloops NorthPaws before falling to the Bellingham Bells in the North Division Championship Game. Second baseman Joichiro Oyama won WCL co-MVP by breaking AppleSox single-season records for plate appearances (276), runs (54), stolen bases (42) and walks (42) while also tying for the single-season record for triples (6) and games played (54). He also broke the WCL single-season record for runs and stolen bases with his historic 2022 campaign.

=== 2023 ===
The Applesox are currently 3rd in the north division with a 12–4 record and are tied for first place with the division leading Bells. Easton Amundson (Liberty) leads the league in home runs (6) while Brandham Ponce (Washington State) is 4th in the league in runs batted in (15). Jadon Williamson (Lower Columbia) is tied for second in wins on the mound (2) and Cam Hoiland (Cal Poly San Luis Obispo) is third in ERA (0.60). 7,145 total fans have gone through the gates for an average of 794 per game.

On June 19, infielder Easton Amundson was named one of the players of the week. Amundson had hit three home runs and batted ten runners in over the week.

=== 2024 ===
On June 17, Evan Canfield was named pitcher of the week. Canfield threw eight strikeouts in the AppleSox's 2–1 win over the NorthPaws.

On July 9, Evan Canfield, Jonathan Fitz, Max Hartman, Quincy Vassar, and Garrett Ahern were selected to represent the AppleSox in the 2024 all star game in Bellingham.

The AppleSox qualified for the playoffs for the third straight season after winning both the first and second half. The AppleSox met the HarbourCats in the North Divisional Series for the second straight year winning in three games. The AppleSox hosted the Bells in the North Division Championship Game winning in a 1-0 shutout. The AppleSox then travelled to Portland to face the Pickles in the WCL Championship Game for their first appearance since 2013. The AppleSox led the game 5-4 going into the bottom of the ninth inning, but the Pickles would rally to win the championship 6-5.

=== 2025 ===
Outfielder Brady Bean (Portland) was awarded player of the week on June 2.

On July 8, Carson Boesel (Washington), Mitch Haythorn (Northern Colorado), Cade Martinez (San Diego) and Joe Thornton (Gonzaga) were selected to represent the AppleSox at the All Star Game in Bellingham.

Former AppleSox player Aiva Arquette was the seventh overall pick in the 2025 Major League Baseball draft. Arquette was selected by the Miami Marlins.

The AppleSox regressed from their 34-19 record from the previous season. The team went 31-23 and finished fourth in the North Division. Haythorn finished tied for first in the league with fifty-four strikeouts. Haythorn also finished third in the league with a 3.33 ERA. Easton Brooks (Utah Tech) threw thirty-nine strikeouts. 23,926 total fans attended the AppleSox's twenty-seven home games for an average of 886 fans per game.

The AppleSox qualified for the postseason as a wildcard for their fourth straight playoff appearance. The AppleSox faced the Bells in the North Divisional Series but lost the series 1-2.

=== 2026 ===
Kainoa Santiago was named player of the week by the league on June 15th.

== Ballpark traditions ==
=== Kid's choir ===
AppleSox games feature a special seventh-inning stretch. Local kids are invited out to the field with the team's mascot, "Coyote", to sing "Take Me Out to the Ballgame".

=== Strikeout socks ===
The AppleSox hang embroidered socks from a clothesline on the press box, each time their pitcher strikes out an opposing batter. After five strikeouts by AppleSox pitching the team's guest services workers toss socks to fans in the seating area.

=== Race the Coyote ===
Long-time AppleSox mascot, Coyote rounds the bases in a race against a fan, normally a child. It is tradition that he loses against the children; however, he has accumulated a few wins on "Mascot" nights when he races other local mascots instead of children.

=== Ketchup and Mustard Race ===
During the fifth inning of each home game everyone's two favorite condiments race each other from the left field foul pole to the right field foul pole.

=== Tommy Watanabe Award ===
AppleSox pitcher Tommy Watanabe died late in the 2017 season to the shock of the team and his family and friends. He left an indelible mark on all whom he interacted with and the AppleSox began honoring him the following the season with an award in his name. The Tommy Watanabe Award is annually presented to the AppleSox player who best shows passion and respect for baseball as well as those who play or work in the game. Wenatchee native Jacob Prater was presented with the inaugural award in 2018.

==== Tommy Watanabe Award Winners ====
- 2018: Jacob Prater
- 2019: Johnny Sage
- 2021: Michael O'Hara
- 2022: Joichiro Oyama
- 2023: Jake Putnam
- 2024: Jack DeDonato
- 2025: Cade Martinez

=== Section 'A' ===
The fans at Paul Thomas Sr. Field take a special liking each year to the AppleSox first base-coach, giving him a loud ovation each time he jogs to the coaches box. The tradition began with the fans in section A along the first baseline in 2006 and has spread across the entire stadium.

== Results by season ==
League Champions	Division Champions	Playoff Team

Year	League	Division	Finish	Wins	Losses	Win%	GB	Postseason	Manager
2005	WCL		1st	29	7	.805	0	Won Championship Series (Bellingham)	Ed Knaggs
2006	WCL		2nd	27	15	.642	1	Won Championship Series (Spokane)	Ed Knaggs
2007	WCL	East	1st	29	13	.690	0	Lost Division Series (Moses Lake)	Ed Knaggs
2008	WCL	East	1st	23	19	.547	0	Lost Championship Series (Corvallis)	Ed Knaggs
2009	WCL	East	1st	34	14	.708	0	Won Championship Series (Corvallis)	Ed Knaggs
2010	WCL	East	1st	29	19	.604	0	Won Division Series 2–0 (Kelowna); Won Championship Series 2–1 (Bend)	Ed Knaggs
2011	WCL	East	1st	39	15	.722	0	Lost Division Series (Walla Walla)	Ed Knaggs
2012	WCL	East	1st	37	17	.685	0	Won Championship Series (Corvallis)	Ed Knaggs
2013	WCL	North	2nd	29	24	.547	2	Lost Championship Series (Corvallis)	Ed Knaggs
2014	WCL	East	2nd	30	24	.556	5	Did Not Qualify	Ed Knaggs
2015	WCL	East	3rd	24	30	.444	10.5	Did Not Qualify	AJ Proszek
2016	WCL	North	5th	19	35	.352	21	Did Not Qualify	AJ Proszek
2017	WCL	North	2nd	29	25	.537	2	Did Not Qualify	Kyle Krustangel
2018	WCL	North	5th	26	28	.481	9	Did Not Qualify	Kyle Krustangel
2019	WCL	North	2nd	29	25	.537	10	Lost Division Series (Victoria)	Kyle Krustangel
2020	Season cancelled (COVID-19 pandemic)								
2021	WCL	North	3rd	20	28	.417	9	Did Not Qualify	Ian Sanderson
2022	WCL	North	2nd	27	27	.500	6.5	Won North Division Series 2–0 (Kamloops); Lost North Division Championship Game 2–4 (at Bellingham)	Mitch Darlington
2023	WCL	North	2nd	37	17	.685	1.5	Lost North Division Series 0–2 (Victoria)	Mitch Darlington
2024	WCL	North	1st	34	19	.642	-	Won North Division Series 2–1 (Victoria); Won North Division Championship Game 1–0 (Bellingham); Lost WCL Championship Game 5–6 (at Portland)	Mitch Darlington
2025	WCL	North	4th	31	23	.574	3	Lost North Division Series 1–2 (Bellingham)	Mitch Darlington
2026	WCL	North	1st	39	13	.750	0	Won North Division Series 2-0 (Kelowna); Won North Division Championship Game 18-4 (Bellingham); Won WCL Championship Game 8-7 (Corvallis)	Mitch Darlington

== Championships ==
- League Championships (7): 2003, 2005, 2006, 2009, 2010, 2012, 2026
- First Half Championships (2): 2024, 2026
- Second Half Championships (3): 2022, 2024, 2026
- PIL Division Championships (2): 2002, 2004
- WCL Division Championships (9): 2005, 2008, 2009, 2010, 2011, 2012, 2013, 2024, 2026

== Notable alumni ==
- Jason Hammel (2001)
- Bobby Carlson (2003)
- Cole Gillespie (2004)
- Clay Mortensen (2005–2006)
- Blaine Hardy (2006)
- Tommy Milone (2006)
- Steve Ames (2008)
- Chad Smith (2008)
- Trevor Brown (2010)
- Marco Gonzales (2010)
- Zack Weiss (2010)
- Pat Valaika (2011)
- Taylor Jones (2012)
- James Kaprielian (2012)
- Simon Rosenbaum (2014)
- Brandon Bailey (2014)
- Drew Rassmussen (2014)
- Griffin Canning (2014)
- Trenton Brooks (2014)
- Keston Hiura (2015)
- Tyler Burch (2015–2016)
- Michael Toglia (2016)
- Matt Fraizer (2016)
- Ryan Kreidler (2016)
- Casey Legumina (2016)
- Alek Jacob (2017)
- Aiva Arquette (2022)
