= Paul Thomas Sr. Field =

Baseball stadium in Washington, US

- Interactive map of Paul Thomas Sr. Field
- Location: 1300 Fifth Street, Wenatchee, Washington, USA
- Coordinates: 47.431289°N 120.340352°W
- Capacity: 1,200
- Surface: Natural Grass
- Field size: 335 ft. (LF); 406 ft. (CF); 325 ft. (RF)

Tenants
- Wenatchee AppleSox (WCL); Wenatchee Valley College Knights (NWAACC)

Paul Thomas Field is a 1,200-seat baseball stadium in Wenatchee, Washington. It is located on the campus of Wenatchee Valley College; the college's baseball team shares the stadium with the Wenatchee AppleSox of the West Coast League.

540 of the stadium's seats were previously used at the Kingdome in Seattle.
