= NorBrock Stadium =

Baseball field in Kamloops, British Columbia

- Location within British Columbia Location within Canada
- Interactive map of NorBrock Stadium
- Address: Island Parkway; Kamloops, British Columbia; Canada
- Location: McArthur Island Park
- Coordinates: 50.697223°N 120.373568°W
- Capacity: 1,500
- Surface: Natural grass
- Field size: Left field: 320 ft (98 m); Centre field: 400 ft (120 m); Right field: 320 ft (98 m)

Construction
- Built: 1967

Tenant
- Kamloops NorthPaws (WCL) 2022–present

NorBrock Stadium is a professional-sized baseball field located at the McArthur Island Park in Kamloops, British Columbia, in Canada. It was built as a 1967 Canada Centennial project and seats approximately 1,500 spectators.

It hosts the annual Kamloops International Ball Tournament, which involves both Canadian and American teams, every July.

The Kamloops NorthPaws have played collegiate summer baseball at Norbrock Stadium in the West Coast League since 2022, their first season having been delayed a year due to COVID-19 restrictions.
