= Dane Dunning =

American baseball player (born 1994)

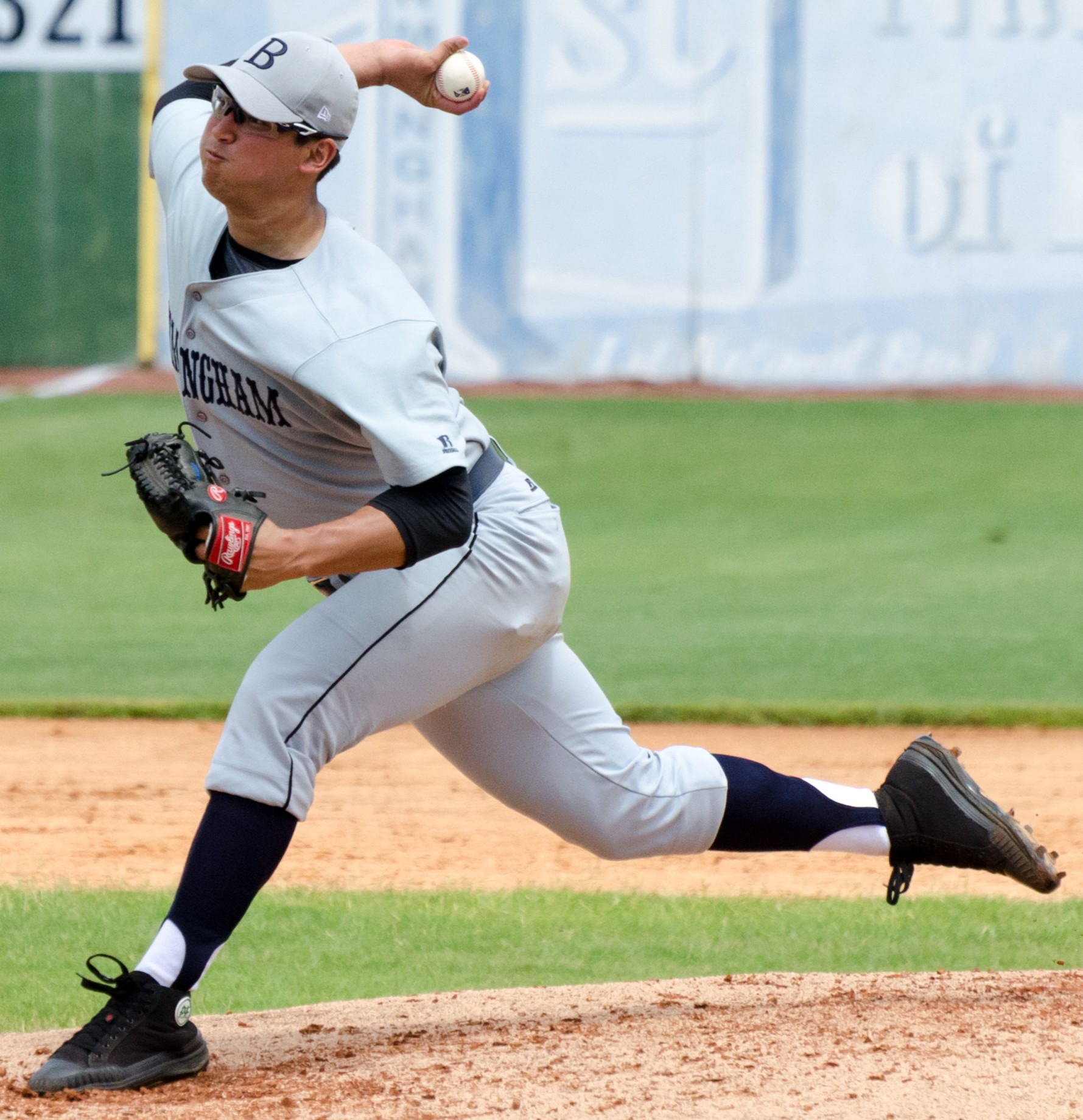
- Dunning with the Birmingham Barons in 2018

Free agent
- Pitcher
- Born: December 20, 1994 (age 31); Orange Park, Florida, U.S.
- Bats: Right Throws: Right

MLB debut
- August 19, 2020, for the Chicago White Sox

MLB statistics (through 2025 season)
- Win–loss record: 28–32
- Earned run average: 4.44
- Strikeouts: 538
- Stats at Baseball Reference

Teams
- Chicago White Sox (2020); Texas Rangers (2021–2025); Atlanta Braves (2025)

Career highlights and awards
- World Series champion (2023)

Dane Anthony Dunning (born December 20, 1994) is an American professional baseball pitcher who is a free agent. He has previously played in Major League Baseball (MLB) for the Chicago White Sox, Texas Rangers, and Atlanta Braves.

== Career ==
=== Amateur career ===
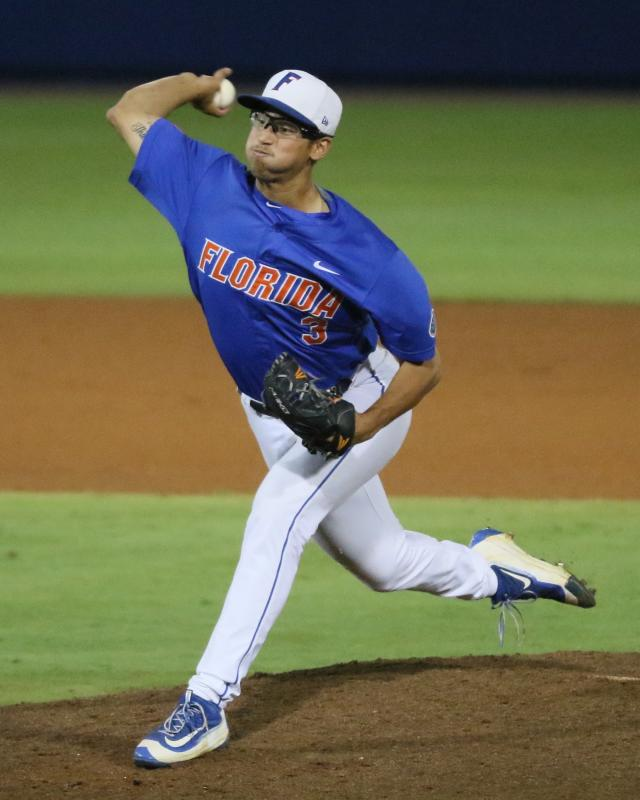
Dunning pitching for the Florida Gators in 2016

After graduating from Clay High School in Green Cove Springs, Florida, Dunning attended the University of Florida, where he played college baseball for the Florida Gators. He pitched in 17 games as a freshman, finishing the year with a 4.50 earned run average (ERA). In the summer after his freshman year, he pitched for the Waterloo Bucks of the Northwoods League. His sophomore year, Dunning began starting more games, as opposed to the reliever role he had his freshman year, finishing the year with a 4.03 ERA in 16 appearances, 14 of which were starts. As a junior, Dunning returned to the bullpen. He appeared in 33 games, only five of which were starts, and had a 2.29 ERA. In the 2016 NCAA Division I baseball tournament, Dunning pitched 15 1/3 innings, conceding only one run.

=== Washington Nationals ===
The Washington Nationals selected Dunning in the first round of the 2016 MLB draft. He split time during his first professional season between the Gulf Coast League Nationals and the Auburn Doubledays, where he posted a combined 3–2 win–loss record and a 2.02 ERA in eight games for both teams.

=== Chicago White Sox ===
On December 7, 2016, the Nationals traded Dunning, Reynaldo López, and Lucas Giolito to the Chicago White Sox in exchange for outfielder Adam Eaton. Dunning began the 2017 season with the Kannapolis Intimidators. After he posted a 0.35 ERA in 26 innings, the White Sox promoted him to the Winston-Salem Dash, where he spent the rest of the season, posting a 6–8 record and 3.51 ERA in 22 games started. He spent 2018 with both Winston-Salem and the Birmingham Barons, pitching to a combined 6–3 record and 2.71 ERA in 15 starts for both teams.

Dunning underwent Tommy John surgery on March 18, 2019, after suffering a torn ulnar collateral ligament. His surgery was performed by Dr. James Andrews. Dunning missed the entire 2019 season. On November 20, the White Sox added Dunning to their 40-man roster to protect him from the Rule 5 draft.

Dunning was called up to the active roster and made his MLB debut on August 19, 2020, striking out seven batters with just one walk in 4 1/3 innings in a 5–3 victory over the Detroit Tigers. With the 2020 White Sox, Dunning appeared in seven games, with a 2–0 record, 3.97 ERA, and 35 strikeouts in 34 innings.

=== Texas Rangers ===
On December 7, 2020, Chicago traded Dunning and Avery Weems to the Texas Rangers in exchange for Lance Lynn. On June 1, 2021, Dunning recorded his first major league hit, a single off of Colorado Rockies starter Germán Márquez. Dunning finished the 2021 season with a 5–10 record, 4.51 ERA, and 114 strikeouts over 117 2/3 innings.

Dunning went 4–8 with a 4.46 ERA and 137 strikeouts over 153 1/3 innings for Texas in 2022. He underwent surgery to repair a torn labrum in his right hip at the end of September, causing him to miss the end of the season.

Dunning made 35 appearances (26 starts) for the Rangers during the 2023 regular season, posting a 12–7 record and 3.70 ERA with a career-high 140 strikeouts across 172 2/3 innings pitched. The Rangers went on to defeat the Arizona Diamondbacks in the World Series, giving Dunning his first World Series ring. He also received the Texas Rangers Pitcher of the Year award in 2023. Dunning pitched in 26 games (15 starts) for Texas in 2024, compiling a 5–7 record and 5.31 ERA with 91 strikeouts over 95 innings of work.

On March 25, 2025, Dunning was removed from the 40-man roster and sent outright to the Triple-A Round Rock Express. On April 28, the Rangers selected Dunning's contract, adding him to their active roster. He made one appearance for Texas before being designated for assignment on April 30. Dunning cleared waivers and was sent outright to Round Rock on May 3. On June 23, the Rangers added Dunning back to their active roster. He made one appearance before being optioned back to Round Rock on June 28 to make room for Nathan Eovaldi. Dunning was recalled again on July 1.

=== Atlanta Braves ===
On July 17, 2025, Dunning was traded to the Atlanta Braves in exchange for José Ruiz and cash considerations. In seven appearances for Atlanta, he struggled to a 10.80 ERA with 11 strikeouts across 10 innings pitched. On October 1, he was removed from the 40-man roster and sent outright to the minors; he rejected the assignment and elected free agency the following day.

=== Seattle Mariners ===
On January 22, 2026, Dunning signed a minor league contract with the Seattle Mariners. In 12 games (11 starts) between Triple-A and Double-A he threw 42.2 innings going 2-6 with a 7.17 ERA and 41 strikeouts. He elected free agency on November 2.

== International career ==
Dunning joined the South Korea national team for the 2026 World Baseball Classic (WBC).

== Personal life ==
Dunning is half-Korean, born to a Korean mother and an American father. In 2020, he expressed desire to play for the South Korea national baseball team in the World Baseball Classic. His older brother, Jake, has also pitched in MLB.

Dunning married his wife in November 2021, and she had a son on May 25, 2023.
