= KCSY =

Coordinates: 48.318°N 120.114°W

- Twisp, Washington; United States
- Frequency: 106.3 MHz
- Branding: Sunny FM

Programming
- Format: Oldies
- Affiliations: Wenatchee AppleSox

Ownership
- Owner: Resort Radio, LLC.; (Resort Radio, LLC.)

History
- First air date: June 1993 (as KVLR)
- Former call signs: KDTP (1992–1993); KVLR (1993–2006)
- Call sign meaning: K C SunnY

Technical information
- Licensing authority: FCC
- Facility ID: 41319
- Class: A
- ERP: 220 watts
- HAAT: 499 meters
- Translators: 93.9 K230AX (Wenatchee Etc.); 95.3 K237AW (Chelan); 98.1 K251AZ (Malaga); 101.3 K267AX (Brewster); 101.9 K270AU (Omak); 107.7 K299AY (Brewster)

Links
- Public license information: Public file; LMS
- Webcast: Listen Live
- Website: kcsyfm.com

KCSY (106.3 FM, "Sunny FM") is a radio station broadcasting out of Twisp, Washington.
