= Elks Stadium =

Baseball stadium located in Kelowna, British Columbia

- Interactive map of Elks Stadium
- Location: 663 Recreation Ave; Kelowna, British Columbia
- Coordinates: 49°53′48″N 119°29′24″W
- Capacity: 1,250
- Surface: Grass

Tenants
- Kelowna Falcons (WCL) (2010–present); Kelowna Heat (CBL) (2003); Okanagan College Coyotes (CCBC) (2008-present)

Elks Stadium is a baseball stadium located in Kelowna, British Columbia. The stadium is home to the Kelowna Falcons of the West Coast League.
