= Jay Johnson (baseball coach) =

American college baseball coach

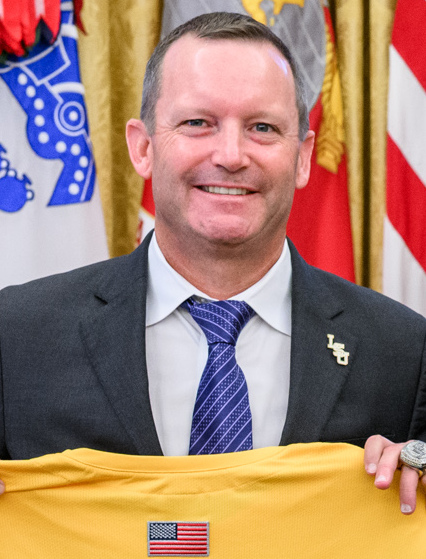
- Johnson in 2025

Current position
- Title: Head coach
- Team: LSU
- Conference: SEC
- Record: 220–105 (.677)
- Annual salary: $3.05 million per year

Biographical details
- Born: April 20, 1977 (age 49); Oroville, California, U.S.

Playing career
- 1997–1998: Shasta College
- 1999–2000: Point Loma Nazarene
- Position: Second baseman

Coaching career (HC unless noted)
- 2001–2004: Point Loma Nazarene (asst.)
- 2005: Point Loma Nazarene
- 2006–2013: San Diego (Asst.)
- 2014–2015: Nevada
- 2016–2021: Arizona
- 2022–present: LSU

Head coaching record
- Overall: 537–276 (.661)
- Tournaments: NCAA: 43–16

Accomplishments and honors

Championships
- 2× College World Series (2023, 2025); 4× CWS Appearances (2016, 2021, 2023, 2025); MW (2015); Pac–12 (2021)

Awards
- MW Coach of the Year (2015); Pac–12 Coach of the Year (2021); National Coach of the Year (2023, 2025)

Jay Bradley Johnson (born April 20, 1977) is an American college baseball coach and former second baseman, who is the current head baseball coach of the LSU Tigers, whom he led to national championship victories in 2023 and 2025. He played college baseball at Shasta College from 1997 to 1998 before transferring to Point Loma Nazarene. He then served as the head coach at Point Loma Nazarene (2005), Nevada (2014–2015) and Arizona (2016–2021).

== Education ==
Born and raised in Oroville, California, Johnson graduated from Oroville High School in 1995 and began his college baseball career at Shasta College, a junior college in Redding, California, in 1997. After two years at Shasta, Johnson transferred to Point Loma Nazarene in the 1998–99 school year to complete his college career. A second baseman and starter in the 1999 and 2000 seasons, he hit .326 for the Sea Lions as a senior.

== Coaching career ==
While completing his bachelor's degree in physical education, Johnson became an assistant coach at Point Loma Nazarene in 2001 and remained an assistant coach after graduating before being promoted to head coach for the 2005 season. Johnson led the Sea Lions to a #6 national ranking in the NAIA and a division championship.

On August 23, 2005, Johnson became an assistant coach at the University of San Diego. The Toreros won three West Coast Conference championships and made four appearances in the NCAA Division I Baseball Championship with Johnson on staff.

On June 28, 2013, Nevada announced that Johnson would take over as head coach.

In two seasons at Nevada, Johnson guided the Wolf Pack to a 72–42 record. In 2015, Nevada posted a 41–15 record and captured the school's first-ever Mountain West title with a 22–7 mark in league play. The Wolf Pack was ranked in the top 25 for much of the season and totaled a 13–1 record in series of at least three games. The 41 overall wins ranked second in program history. In 2015 Johnson was named Mountain West Coach of the Year.

In 2016 Johnson guided the Wildcats to a seventh appearance in the College World Series where they ended up falling to Coastal Carolina in the championship series.

On June 24, 2021, Johnson left Arizona to become the head coach of the LSU Tigers. Johnson led LSU to 2 College World Series Titles in 2023 and 2025.

== Head coaching record ==
Below is a table of Johnson's yearly records as an NCAA head baseball coach.

Record table
Season	Team	Overall	Conference	Standing	Postseason
Point Loma Nazarene Sea Lions (Pacific West Conference) (2005–2005)
2005	Point Loma Nazarene	37–14	20-8		
Loma Nazarene:		37–14 (.725)	20–8 (.714)		
Nevada Wolf Pack (Mountain West Conference) (2014–2015)
2014	Nevada	31–28	15–15	4th	
2015	Nevada	41–15	22–7	1st	
Nevada:		72–43 (.626)	37–22 (.627)		
Arizona Wildcats (Pac-12 Conference) (2016–2021)
2016	Arizona	49–24	17–15	3rd	College World Series Runner-up
2017	Arizona	38–21	16–14	4th	NCAA Regional
2018	Arizona	34–22	14–16	6th	
2019	Arizona	32–24	15–14	6th	
2020	Arizona	10–5	0–0		Season canceled due to COVID-19
2021	Arizona	45–18	21–9	1st	College World Series
Arizona:		208–114 (.646)	83–68 (.550)		
LSU Tigers (Southeastern Conference) (2022–present)
2022	LSU	40–22	17–13	3rd (West)	NCAA Regional
2023	LSU	54–17	19–10	2nd (West)	College World Series Champions
2024	LSU	43–23	13–17	T–4th (West)	NCAA Regional
2025	LSU	53–15	19–11	T–3rd	College World Series Champions
2026	LSU	30–28	9–21	14th	
LSU:		220–105 (.677)	77–72 (.517)		
Total:		537–276 (.661)			
National champion Postseason invitational champion Conference regular season champion Conference regular season and conference tournament champion Division regular season champion Division regular season and conference tournament champion Conference tournament champion

== See also ==
- List of current NCAA Division I baseball coaches
