= Kelowna Falcons =

College baseball team

- [[File: |frameless|class=pageimage|alt=]] Logo

Information
- League: West Coast League
- Location: Kelowna, British Columbia
- Ballpark: Elks Stadium
- Founded: 2000
- League championships: 0
- Division championships: 2 (2015, 2018)
- Former league: Pacific International League (2000-2004)
- Colours: Red, navy blue, white
- Ownership: Dan Nonis
- General manager: Dan Nonis

The Kelowna Falcons are a collegiate summer baseball team located in Kelowna, British Columbia. The Falcons are members of the West Coast League and play their home games at Elks Stadium.

Originally an expansion team in the Pacific International League, the Falcons left the league following the 2004 season and became a founding member of the West Coast League. The Falcons have won two division titles and have made two appearances in the WCL Championship; most recently in 2018.

== History ==
The franchise traces its roots back to the Kelowna Grizzlies, who were founded in 1993. The Grizzlies were members of the Pacific International League. During their tenure the Grizzlies won the 1995 league championship. Following the 1998 the club suspended operations. The franchise was sold in 2000 and rebranded as the Falcons. Kelowna continued this membership with the Pacific International League playing from 2000 through 2004. In 2005, the Falcons along with Bellingham, Bend, Spokane, and Wenatchee left the league to form the West Coast Collegiate Baseball League (WCCBL).

=== 2010 ===
The Falcons finished second in the East Division with a 22-26 record. Pitcher Dayne Quist lead the league with an ERA of 1.40 and finished with 50 strikeouts and six wins on the mound. Ben Edlestein finished with a batting average of .347. 16,027 fans attended games for an average of 668 per game.

The Falcons were swept in the Division Series by the AppleSox 0-2. 1,132 total fans attended Kelowna's only home game in the playoffs.

=== 2022 season ===
The Falcons failed to make it to the postseason for the second straight season, finishing seventh in the north division with a record of 20-33, 13 games behind the division winning Bellingham Bells. The Falcons saw 22,722 total fans for an average of 947 per game. Jasper Nelson (Sacramento State) and Nick Woodcock (Yavapai College) received honourable mentions in the All-WCL team after the season.

=== 2023 season ===
On July 17, Koen Van't Klooster was named pitcher of the week.

The Falcons finished fourth in the north division. The team averaged 1,064 fans per game, below the league average.

=== 2024 ===
On July 9, Trey Duffield and Gavyn Jones were selected to represent the Falcons in the All Star Game.

The Falcons failed to improve on their 31-23 record from the previous season, posting a 20-34 record and finishing sixth in the north division, 15 games behind the division leading AppleSox. 23,776 fans attended home games for an average of 914 per game.

The Falcons failed to make the postseason.

=== 2025 ===
Joel Hogan was named pitcher of the week by the league on June 9. Gio De Graau (Newman) earned the same honour on June 30.

De Graau was selected to represent Kelowna at the All Star Game in Bellingham on July 8.

Former Falcon JP Smith was selected in the 2025 Major League Baseball draft.

The Falcons regressed from the previous season. The team went 19-35 and finished last in the North Division. 13,746 total fans attended the Falcons' twenty-seven home games for an average of 509 fans per game.

The Falcons were eliminated from playoff contention for the second straight season.

=== 2026 ===
The Falcons improved on their 19-35 record from the previous season. The team posted a 30-24 record and finished fourth in the North Division. Pitcher Max Biddle finished second in the league with a 3.15 ERA, three wins, and thirty-three strikeouts. The Falcons qualified for the postseason after a two year absence as a wildcard but were swept in the North Division Series by the Wenatchee AppleSox two games to none. Kelowna has not won a playoff game since their division series win over Bellingham in 2018.

Matthew Pena was named the WCL's player of the week twice on June 1st and July 6th. Seth Summer was awarded pitcher of the week on June 29th.

Former Falcon Griffin Naess was selected by the Chicago Cubs in the 2026 Major League Baseball draft.

Jacob Loving and Seth Summer were chosen to represent Kelowna at the 2026 WCL All Star Game in Victoria.

== Results by Season ==
League Champions	Division Champions	Playoff Team

Season	League	Division	Finish	Wins	Losses	Win%	GB	Postseason	Manager
2000	PIL			16	13	.551		Did Not Qualify	
2001	PIL			16	19	.457		Did Not Qualify	Mike McGuire
2002	PIL			18	18	.500		Did Not Qualify	Kevin Tucker
2003	PIL			14	16	.466		Did Not Qualify	Dax Leone
2004	PIL			22	14	.611		Did Not Qualify	Dax Leone
2005	WCL			16	20	.444		Did Not Qualify	Brian Hoop
2006	WCL			13	29	.309		Did Not Qualify	David Robb
2007	WCL			12	30	.285		Did Not Qualify	Duane Bozic
2008	WCL			21	20	.512		Lost Division Series	Kevin Frady
2009	WCL			24	24	.500		Lost Division Series	Kevin Frady
2010	WCL	East	2nd	22	26	.458	7	Lost Division Series 0-2 (Wenatchee)	Kevin Frady
2011	WCL	East	4th	19	34	.358	19.5	Did Not Qualify	Al Cantwell
2012	WCL	East	3rd	28	26	.519	9	Did Not Qualify	Al Cantwell
2013	WCL	North	5th	19	35	.352	12.5	Did Not Qualify	Geoff White
2014	WCL	East	4th	14	39	.264	20.5	Did Not Qualify	Billy Clontz
2015	WCL	East	1st	34	19	.642	0	Won Division Series 2-1 (Bellingham); Lost Championship Series 0-2 (Bend)	Billy Clontz
2016	WCL	North	4th	25	29	.463	15	Did Not Qualify	Bryan Donahue
2017	WCL	North	2nd	28	26	.519	1	Lost Division Series 0-2 (Victoria)	Bryan Donahue
2018	WCL	North	2nd	28	26	.519	7	Won Division Series 2-1 (Bellingham); Lost Championship Series 0-2 (Corvallis)	Bryan Donahue
2019	WCL	North	6th	17	35	.327	21	Did Not Qualify	Ryan Wright
2020	Season cancelled (COVID-19 pandemic)								
2021	Season cancelled (COVID-19 pandemic)								
2022	WCL	North	7th	20	33	.377	13	Did Not Qualify	Doug Noce
2023	WCL	North	4th	31	23	.574	7.5	Lost North Divisional Series 0-2 (Bellingham)	Doug Noce
2024	WCL	North	6th	20	32	.385	14	Did Not Qualify	Doug Noce
2025	WCL	North	8th	19	35	.352	15	Did Not Qualify	Doug Noce
2026	WCL	North	4th	30	24	.555	10	Lost Division Series 0-2 (Wenatchee)	Gregg Zaun

== Playoff Appearances ==
- 2004
- 2008
- 2009
- 2010
- 2015 East Division Champions
- 2017 North Division First Half Champions
- 2018 North Division Champions
- 2023 Wildcard Berth
- 2026 Wildcard Berth

== Alumni in Major League Baseball ==
- David Riske
- Aaron Harang
- Jason Bay
- Nyjer Morgan
- Chris Davis
- Jess Todd
- James Paxton
- Tyler Wagner
- Phil Maton
- Connor Joe
