= Connor Joe =

American baseball player (born 1992)

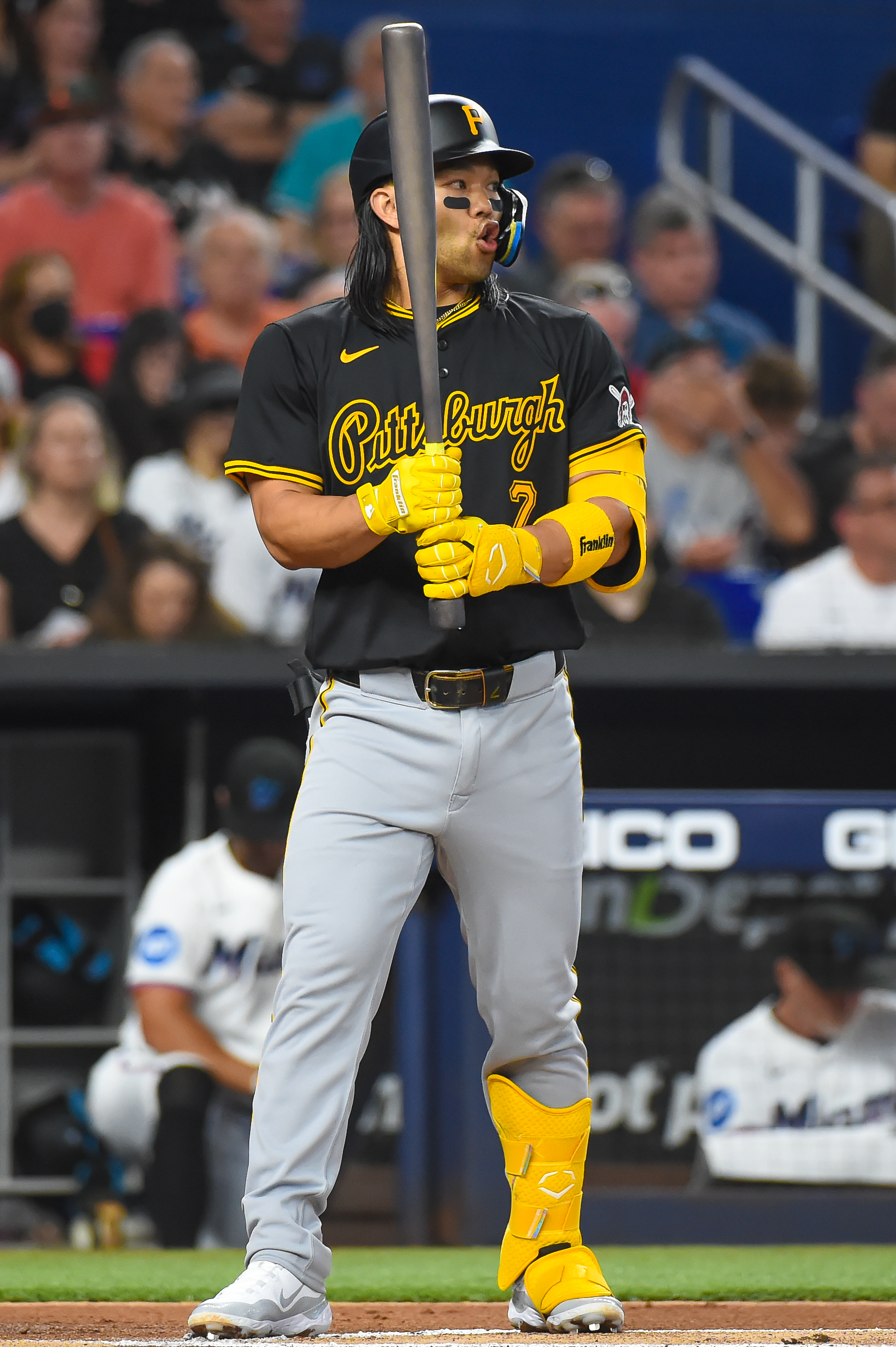
- Joe with the Pittsburgh Pirates in 2024

Free agent
- Outfielder / First baseman
- Born: August 16, 1992 (age 34); San Diego, California, U.S.
- Bats: Right Throws: Right

MLB debut
- March 28, 2019, for the San Francisco Giants

MLB statistics (through 2026 season)
- Batting average: .238
- Home runs: 36
- Runs batted in: 148
- Stats at Baseball Reference

Teams
- San Francisco Giants (2019); Colorado Rockies (2021–2022); Pittsburgh Pirates (2023–2024); San Diego Padres (2025); Cincinnati Reds (2025); Seattle Mariners (2026)

Connor Kok-Wy Joe (born August 16, 1992) is an American professional baseball outfielder and first baseman who is a free agent. He has previously played in Major League Baseball (MLB) for the San Francisco Giants, Colorado Rockies, Pittsburgh Pirates, San Diego Padres, Cincinnati Reds, and Seattle Mariners. The Pirates selected Joe in the first round of the 2014 MLB draft, and he made his MLB debut with the Giants in 2019. He opted out of the 2020 season while recovering from testicular cancer.

== Amateur career ==
Joe attended Poway High School in Poway, California, and the University of San Diego, where he played college baseball for the San Diego Toreros. In 2011, he played collegiate summer baseball with the Kelowna Falcons of the West Coast League prior to attending San Diego. The following summer, he played for the Duluth Huskies of the Northwoods League. In 2013, he was named to the All-West Coast Conference team. That summer, he played with the Chatham Anglers of the Cape Cod Baseball League and was named a league all-star. In three seasons at San Diego, he had a .325/.423/.500 slash line with 19 home runs in 160 games.

== Professional career ==
=== Pittsburgh Pirates ===
The Pittsburgh Pirates selected Joe in the first round, 39th overall, of the 2014 Major League Baseball draft.

Joe made his professional debut in 2015 with the West Virginia Power and batted .245/.366/.303. He spent the 2016 season with the High-A Bradenton Marauders, slashing .277/.351/.392 in 107 games, while playing third base. After the season, he played in the Arizona Fall League, where he batted .204/.371/.347 for the Surprise Saguaros. Joe was assigned to the Double-A Altoona Curve to begin the 2017 season, where he batted .240/.338/.380 in 74 games.

=== Atlanta Braves ===
On August 5, 2017, Joe was traded to the Atlanta Braves in exchange for Sean Rodriguez. In 20 games with the Double-A Mississippi Braves, Joe batted .135/.233/.154.

=== Los Angeles Dodgers ===
On September 25, 2017, Joe was traded to the Los Angeles Dodgers in exchange for international bonus pool money. He split the 2018 season between the Double-A Tulsa Drillers and the Triple-A Oklahoma City Dodgers, slashing .299/.408/.527 with career-highs in home runs (17) and RBI (55).

=== San Francisco Giants ===
On December 13, 2018, Joe was selected by the Cincinnati Reds in the Rule 5 draft. On March 21, 2019, the Reds traded Joe to the San Francisco Giants in exchange for Jordan Johnson and cash considerations. Joe was the Giants Opening Day left fielder, getting a walk in his MLB debut but batting 0-for-4 in his opening series. He was designated for assignment on April 8 after getting 1 hit in 16 plate appearances.

=== Los Angeles Dodgers (second stint) ===
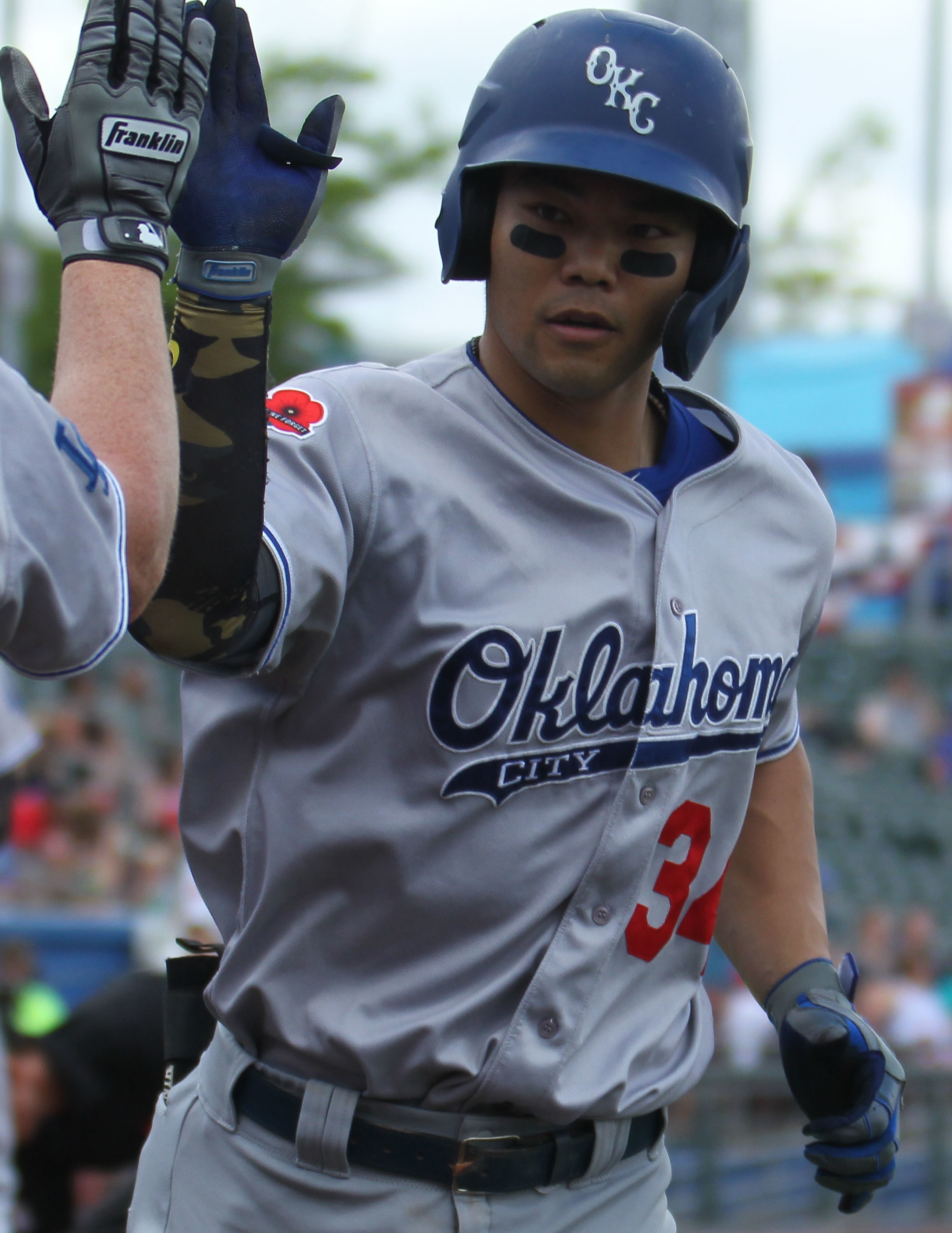
Joe with the Oklahoma City Dodgers in 2019

Joe cleared waivers and was returned to the Dodgers on April 13, 2019. He spent the remainder of the season in Triple-A with Oklahoma City and batted .300/.427/.503 with 15 home runs and 68 RBI. Joe opted out of the 2020 season after being diagnosed with testicular cancer. The minor league season was later cancelled as a result of the COVID-19 pandemic. Joe became a free agent on November 2.

=== Colorado Rockies ===
On November 20, 2020, Joe signed a minor league contract with the Colorado Rockies. On May 7, 2021, Joe was selected to the active roster. Joe primarily played first base while also playing left field, finishing the 2021 season hitting .285 with eight home runs and 35 RBI in 63 games. His season ended in September due to a hamstring injury.

In 2022, Joe batted .238/.338/.359 with seven home runs and 28 RBI in 467 plate appearances.

=== Pittsburgh Pirates (second stint) ===
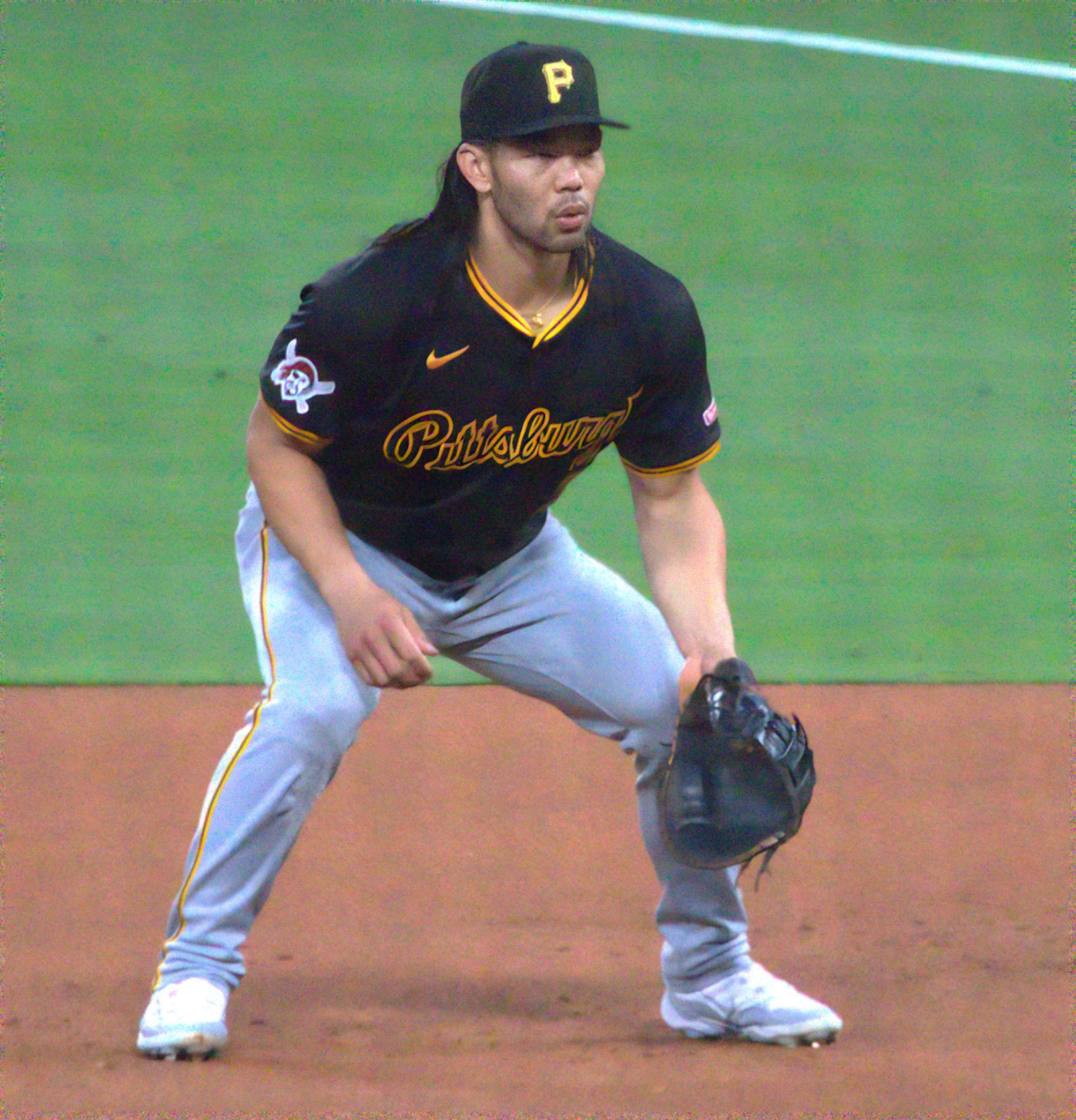
Joe playing first base in 2024.

On December 18, 2022, Colorado traded Joe to the Pittsburgh Pirates in exchange for Nick Garcia. In 133 games for Pittsburgh in 2023, he batted .247/.339/.421 with 11 home runs and 42 RBI.

Joe played in 123 games for Pittsburgh in 2024, he slashed .228/.320/.368 with nine home runs and 36 RBI. On November 22, 2024, the Pirates non-tendered Joe, making him a free agent.

=== San Diego Padres ===
On February 8, 2025, Joe signed a one-year, $1 million contract with the San Diego Padres. He was optioned to the Triple-A El Paso Chihuahuas to begin the season. In seven games for San Diego, Joe went 0-for-9 with one walk.

=== Cincinnati Reds ===
On May 9, 2025, Joe was traded to the Cincinnati Reds in exchange for Andrew Moore and cash considerations. In 35 games for Cincinnati, he batted .213/.286/.279 with four RBI and two stolen bases. On August 31, Joe was removed from the 40-man roster and sent outright to the Triple-A Louisville Bats. He elected free agency on September 29.

=== Seattle Mariners ===
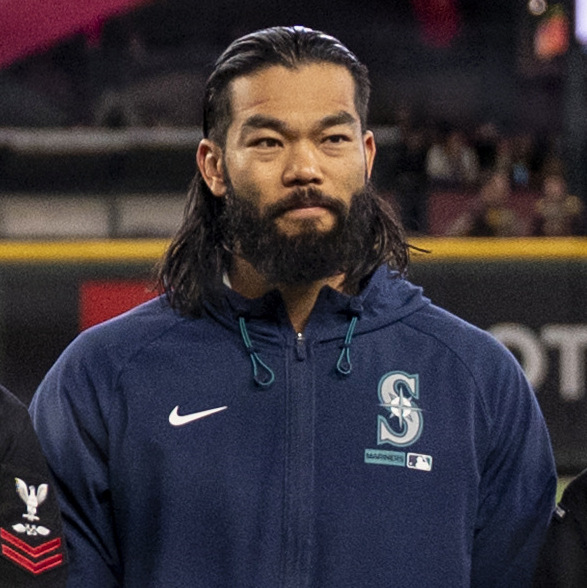
Joe with the Seattle Mariners in 2026

On February 10, 2026, Joe signed a minor league contract with the Seattle Mariners. He was assigned to the Triple-A Tacoma Rainiers to begin the regular season. On April 8, Joe was selected to Seattle's active roster following an injury to Víctor Robles. He made 21 appearances for the Mariners, slashing .179/.289/.308 with one home run, three RBI, and two stolen bases. Joe was designated for assignment by Seattle on September 1. He cleared waivers and was sent outright to Tacoma on September 3. He elected free agency on November 2.

== Personal life ==
Joe is Chinese American. His grandparents immigrated from China: his father's family moved to Connecticut and his mother’s family moved to New York. After his parents married, they moved to Poway, California, a suburb of San Diego. His family owned and operated two restaurants in San Diego.

Joe and his wife reside in Arizona. They met at the University of San Diego, where he played baseball and his wife played softball. They married in November 2018. Their daughter was born in December 2022.

On March 18, 2020, Joe announced he had undergone surgery for testicular cancer and was in his recovery process. The cancer had spread to his lungs. He was declared cancer free on July 20.

== See also ==
- Rule 5 draft results
