= Kamloops NorthPaws =

Collegiate summer baseball team in Kamloops, British Columbia

- Logo

Information
- League: West Coast League
- Location: Kamloops, British Columbia
- Ballpark: NorBrock Stadium
- Founded: 2020
- Colours: Black, red, cream
- Mascot: Homer

The Kamloops NorthPaws are a collegiate summer baseball team located in Kamloops, British Columbia. The NorthPaws are members of the West Coast League and since 2022 have played their home games at NorBrock Stadium.

The Northpaws were founded following the conclusion of the 2020 season but did not play until 2022 due to COVID restrictions. The NorthPaws clinched their first playoff berth that same year but have not been back since. The NorthPaws are also one of three teams in the league to never clinch a winning regular season record alongside Port Angeles and Springfield.

== History ==
The Kamloops NorthPaws were founded in 2020 as an expansion member of the West Coast League. The franchise was announced on September 9, 2020, by owners Norm Daley, Neal Perry, and Jon Pankuch. The moniker NorthPaws was selected to denote Canadian pride and show cohesion among local baseball programs. Additionally, the name is a play on the term southpaw. The colors red and black were chosen with the incorporation of cream to provide a vintage look. Surrey native, Cole Armstrong was tabbed as the club's first manager.

The NorthPaws debut season was delayed to 2022 when the league's Canadian teams sat out the 2021 season due to COVID-19 restrictions.

=== 2022 ===
The NorthPaws finished third in the North Division with a 26-27 record. Zach Beatty (McCook Community College) and Felix Chenier Rondeau (Oklahoma City University) combined for nineteen home runs. Pitcher Ben Polack (San Jose State) picked up five wins on the mound while Sean Heppner threw 43 strikeouts and held an ERA of 2.64. 19,007 total fans attended regular season home games for an average of 760 per game.

The NorthPaws qualified for the postseason as a wildcard. Their season ended in the Divisional Series where they were swept by the AppleSox. 1,180 total fans attended the NorthPaws' one home game in the playoffs.

=== 2023 ===
The NorthPaws failed to improve on their previous season and finished 2023 last in the North Division with the league worst 12-40 record. 16,496 total fans attended home games for an average of 717 per game.

=== 2024 ===
Outfielder and pitcher Joey Rico (Westmont College) was named player of the week on July 1. Rico connected for ten base hits over the week and earned his first home run and save in the NorthPaws' 7-5 win over the Sweets.

On July 9, Joey Rico was selected to represent the NorthPaws in the All Star Game.

The NorthPaws improved on their 12-42 record from the previous season posting a 15-39 record. Despite the improvement, the NorthPaws would still finish last in the north division for the second straight season being twenty games behind the division leading AppleSox. 8,343 fans attended games for an average of 309.

The NorthPaws failed to make the playoffs for the second year in a row.

=== 2025 ===
On July 8, it was announced that Mason Chien (Fraser Valley), Elijah Clayton (California) Jared Hall (Bethel) and Keith Manby (Thompson River) were selected to represent the Northpaws at the All Star Game in Bellingham.

Former NorthPaws Shane Brinham, Tyrelle Chadwick and Ryan Heppner were selected in the 2025 Major League Baseball draft.

The NorthPaws improved on their 15-39 record from the previous season. The team went 25-29 and finished fifth in the North Division. 11,794 total fans attended the NorthPaws' twenty-six home games for an average of 454 fans per game.

The NorthPaws were eliminated from playoff contention for the third straight season. The NorthPaws are also one of four teams in the league to never clinch a winning season.

=== 2026 ===
The NorthPaws failed to improve on their 25-29 record from the previous season. The team posted a 22-32 record and finished seventh in the north division.

Kade Crawford finished with a two way share of the most home runs with eleven. Crawford was also fifth in the league with forty-three runs batted in and third in stolen bases with twenty-four.

Crawford was awarded the league's player of the week accolade on June 8th. Evan Dugdale would receive the pitcher of the week award on August 3rd. Alex Lee would receive an honorable mention nod in the league's August 10th iteration of the awards.

Crawford and Dugdale were selected to represent the NorthPaws at the 2026 WCL All Star Game in Victoria. Crawford was responsible for an RBI single in the third inning of the North Division All Star's 4-5 loss to the South Division All Stars.

The NorthPaws failed to qualify for the postseason for the fourth straight year. The NorthPaws are also one of three teams to have never finished with a winning record alongside Port Angeles and Springfield.

== Results by Season ==
League Champions	Division Champions	Playoff Team

Year	League	Division	Finish	Wins	Losses	Win%	GB	Postseason	Manager
2022	WCL	North	3rd	26	27	.491	7	Lost North Divisional Series 0-2 (Wenatchee)	Cole Armstrong
2023	WCL	North	8th	12	40	.231	25.5	Did Not Qualify	Keith Francis
2024	WCL	North	8th	15	38	.283	19	Did Not Qualify	Jose Bautista
2025	WCL	North	5th	25	29	.463	9	Did Not Qualify	Riley Jepson
2026	WCL	North	7th	22	32	.407	18	Did Not Qualify	Riley Jepson

== Playoff appearances ==
- 2022 Wildcard Berth
