= Avery Weems =

American baseball player (born 1997)

Free agent
- Pitcher
- Born: June 6, 1997 (age 29); Flagstaff, Arizona, U.S.
- Bats: Right Throws: Left

Avery Brian Weems (born June 6, 1997) is an American professional baseball pitcher who is a free agent.

== Career ==
=== Amateur career ===
Weems attended Coconino High School in Flagstaff, Arizona. Undrafted out of high school in 2015, he attended Yavapai College to play college baseball. He posted a 4–1 record with a 3.90 ERA with 61 strikeouts over 57 2/3 innings as a freshman in 2016. In 2017, he went 6–4 with a 2.89 ERA and 87 strikeouts over 65 1/3 innings. Following that season, he transferred to the University of Arizona to play for the Wildcats. Weems went 1–3 with a 5.69 ERA and 39 strikeouts over 55 2/3 innings in 2018. In his senior season of 2019, he went 4–5 with a 7.15 ERA and 47 strikeouts over 61 2/3 innings.

=== Chicago White Sox ===
Weems was drafted by the Chicago White Sox in the 6th round of the 2019 Major League Baseball draft and signed with them for a $10,000 signing bonus.

Weems made his professional debut shortly after signing, splitting time between the rookie-level Arizona League White Sox and Great Falls Voyagers, going a combined 5–4 with a 2.09 ERA and 71 strikeouts over 60 1/3 innings. Weems did not play in 2020 due to the cancellation of the Minor League Baseball season because of the COVID-19 pandemic.

=== Texas Rangers ===
On December 8, 2020, Weems and Dane Dunning were traded to the Texas Rangers in exchange for Lance Lynn. During the 2020-2021 offseason, he played for the Atenienses de Manatí of the Puerto Rican Winter League, going 0–0 with a 1.54 ERA and 22 strikeouts over 11 2/3 innings. Weems spent the 2021 season with the Hickory Crawdads of the High-A East, going 4–6 with a 5.06 ERA and 124 strikeouts over 85 1/3 innings. He spent the 2022 season with the Frisco RoughRiders of the Double-A Texas League, going 2–6 with a 5.14 ERA and 107 strikeouts over 91 innings.

Weems received a non-roster invitation to major league spring training in 2023. On February 15, 2023, Weems underwent Tommy John surgery to repair a torn ulnar collateral ligament, and missed the entirety of the 2023 season.

Weems briefly returned to action in 2024, making seven appearances for Hickory and the Triple-A Round Rock Express. He made 34 appearances for the Double-A Frisco RoughRiders in 2025, compiling a 4–1 record and 6.63 ERA with 44 strikeouts and three saves over 38 innings of work. Weems elected free agency following the season on November 6, 2025.

=== Caliente de Durango ===
On May 17, 2026, Weems signed with the Caliente de Durango of the Mexican League. He made one start, giving up no runs and three hits in three innings, before he was pulled from the game due to an injury. Weems was moved to the injured list, and subsequently released by Durango on May 24.
