= Randy Labaut =

Cuban baseball player (born 1996)

Free agent
- Pitcher
- Born: October 1, 1996 (age 29); Havana, Cuba
- Bats: Left Throws: Left

Randy Labaut (born October 1, 1996) is a Cuban professional baseball pitcher who is a free agent.

== Career ==
=== Cleveland Indians / Guardians ===
Labaut was selected by the Cleveland Indians in the 35th round, with the 1,060th overall selection, of the 2019 Major League Baseball draft. He made his professional debut with the rookie–level Arizona League Indians, recording a 1.74 ERA in 11 games. Labaut did not play in a game in 2020 due to the cancellation of the minor league season because of the COVID-19 pandemic.

Labaut returned to action in 2021 with the Single–A Lynchburg Hillcats, posting a 3.09 ERA with 58 strikeouts across 22 appearances. Labaut split the 2022 campaign between the High–A Lake County Captains and Double–A Akron RubberDucks. In 38 relief outings split between the two affiliates, he accumulated an 11–2 record and 3.33 ERA with 89 strikeouts across 70 1/3 innings pitched.

Labaut split the 2023 season between Akron and the Triple–A Columbus Clippers, compiling a 3.70 ERA with 51 strikeouts and 2 saves across 33 total appearances. He returned to Columbus in 2024, making 36 appearances and registering a 3–6 record and 4.57 ERA with 62 strikeouts over 61 innings of work.

=== Pittsburgh Pirates ===
On December 11, 2024, Labaut was selected by the Pittsburgh Pirates in the minor league phase of the Rule 5 draft. In 2025, he made 24 appearances (three starts) for the Single-A Bradenton Marauders, High-A Greensboro Grasshoppers, and Triple-A Indianapolis Indians, accumulating a 5-1 record and 4.69 ERA with 44 strikeouts across 40 1/3 innings pitched. Labaut elected free agency following the season on November 6, 2025.
