= Nick Quintana =

American baseball player (born 1997)

- Third baseman / Second baseman
- Born: October 13, 1997 (age 27); Las Vegas, Nevada, U.S.
- Bats: Right Throws: Right
Medals
Men's baseball
Representing United States
U-18 Baseball World Cup
Gold medal – first place	2015 Osaka	Team

Nicholas Ryan Quintana (born October 13, 1997) is an American former professional baseball infielder.

== Amateur career ==
Quintana attended the University of Arizona following a high school career at Arbor View High School in Las Vegas. He was named to the First Team All-Pac-12 for the first time as a sophomore after hitting .313 with fourteen home runs and 55 RBI over the season. He would repeat the achievement as a junior in 2019 improving upon the prior year's numbers leaping to a .342 batting average, fifteen home runs, and 77 RBIs while improving his OBP from .413 to .462. He was named Collegiate Baseball Second Team All-American, as well a NCBWA Third Team All-American. In 2017 and 2018, he played collegiate summer baseball with the Yarmouth–Dennis Red Sox of the Cape Cod Baseball League.

== Professional career ==
=== Detroit Tigers ===
Quintana was selected by the Detroit Tigers in the second round of the 2019 Major League Baseball draft with the 47th overall pick. This was his second time being selected in the draft, having previously been selected in the eleventh round of the 2016 Major League Baseball draft by the Boston Red Sox. After signing with the Tigers, he would immediately join the Single-A West Michigan Whitecaps. Despite starting in West Michigan, after a slow start hitting just .158 with a .228 OBP while striking out 51 times in 41 games, he would take a step down to the Low–A Connecticut Tigers in early-August. Over 25 games with Connecticut, he batted .256. He did not play in a game in 2020 due to the cancellation of the minor league season because of the COVID-19 pandemic. In 2021, he played with the Single-A Lakeland Flying Tigers, slashing .196/.329/.346 with nine home runs and 46 RBI over 82 games.

=== Cincinnati Reds ===
On November 3, 2021, the Tigers traded Quintana to the Cincinnati Reds in exchange for Tucker Barnhart. Quintana started the 2022 baseball season with the Single-A Dayton Dragons before being promoted to the Double-A Chattanooga Lookouts in June of that year. He remained with Chattanooga for the 2023 season but was on the injured list for much of the season. On January 24, 2024, Quintana announced his retirement from professional baseball.
