= Matt Fraizer =

American baseball player (born 1998)

Free agent
- Outfielder
- Born: January 12, 1998 (age 28); Fresno, California, U.S.
- Bats: Left Throws: Right

Matthew Teran Fraizer (born January 12, 1998) is an American professional baseball outfielder who is a free agent.

== Career ==
=== Amateur ===
Fraizer attended Clovis North High School in Clovis, California. He was drafted by the Oakland Athletics in the 38th round of the 2016 Major League Baseball draft but did not sign and played college baseball at the University of Arizona. In 2018, he played collegiate summer baseball with the Orleans Firebirds of the Cape Cod Baseball League.

=== Pittsburgh Pirates ===
Fraizer was selected by the Pittsburgh Pirates in the third round (95th overall) of the 2019 Major League Baseball draft and signed.

Fraizer made his professional debut with the Low-A West Virginia Black Bears, batting .221 over 43 games. He did not play in a game in 2020 due to the cancellation of the minor league season because of the COVID-19 pandemic. Fraizer started 2021 with the Greensboro Grasshoppers before being promoted to the Double–A Altoona Curve. Over 112 games between the two affiliates, he slashed .306/.388/.552 with 23 home runs, 68 RBI, and 15 stolen bases. Following the season, Fraizer was named as Pittsburgh's minor league Player-of-the-Year.

Fraizer returned to Altoona during the 2022 season, batting .219/.284/.333 with six home runs, 44 RBI, and 18 stolen bases across 116 appearances. In 2023, his third consecutive season with Altoona, Fraizer played in 121 games, slashing .252/.326/.357 with eight home runs, 50 RBI, and 21 stolen bases.

Fraizer split the 2024 campaign between Altoona and the Triple-A Indianapolis Indians. In 101 appearances to the two affiliates, he batted a combined .248/.321/.382 with eight home runs, 44 RBI, and 16 stolen bases. He returned to Indianapolis for the 2025 season, playing in 62 games and hitting .305/.361/.452 with three home runs, 20 RBI, and 14 stolen bases. Fraizer elected free agency following the season on November 6, 2025.

=== Boston Red Sox ===
On December 31, 2025, Fraizer signed a minor league contract with the Boston Red Sox. He made 34 appearances split between the rookie–level Florida Complex League Red Sox and Double–A Portland Sea Dogs, he batted a cumulative .265/.364/.460 with two home runs, 21 RBI, and two stolen bases. Fraizer was released by the Red Sox organization on August 10, 2026.
