= United Sports Equities =

United Sports Equities, LLC is an investor group formed in 2005 which owned United League Baseball. United Sports Equities owned all of the franchises of United League Baseball, which included the Rio Grande Valley WhiteWings, Amarillo Dillas, San Angelo Colts, Alexandria Aces, Laredo Broncos, and Edinburg Coyotes.
