= Jose Canseco =

Cuban baseball player (born 1964)

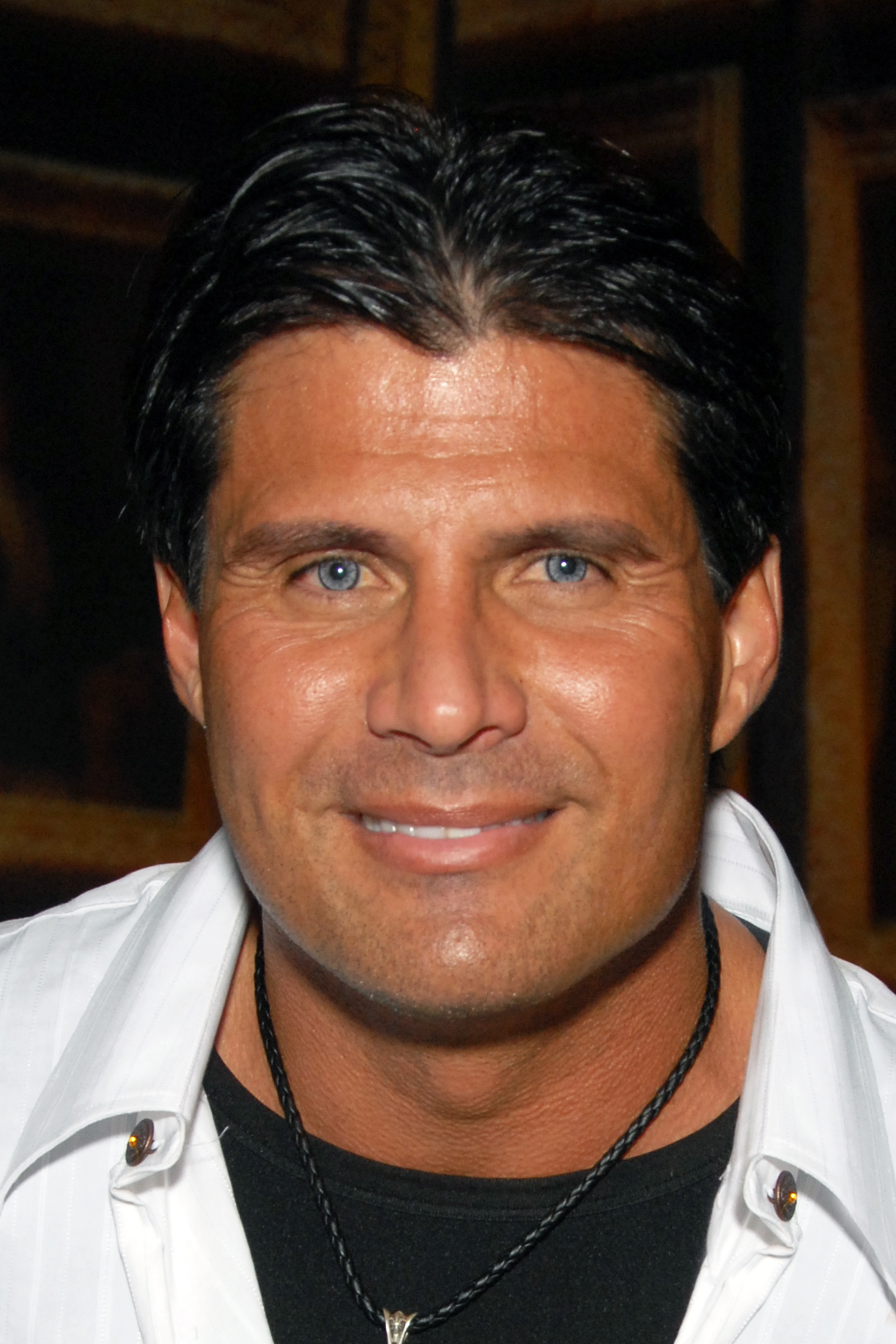
- Canseco in 2009
- Outfielder / Designated hitter
- Born: July 2, 1964 (age 62); Havana, Cuba
- Batted: Right Threw: Right

MLB debut
- September 2, 1985, for the Oakland Athletics

Last MLB appearance
- October 6, 2001, for the Chicago White Sox

MLB statistics
- Batting average: .266
- Home runs: 462
- Runs batted in: 1,407
- Stats at Baseball Reference

Teams
- Oakland Athletics (1985–1992); Texas Rangers (1992–1994); Boston Red Sox (1995–1996); Oakland Athletics (1997); Toronto Blue Jays (1998); Tampa Bay Devil Rays (1999–2000); New York Yankees (2000); Chicago White Sox (2001)

Career highlights and awards
- 6× All-Star (1986, 1988–1990, 1992, 1999); 2× World Series champion (1989, 2000); AL MVP (1988); AL Rookie of the Year (1986); 4× Silver Slugger Award (1988, 1990, 1991, 1998); 2× MLB home run leader (1988, 1991); MLB RBI leader (1988); Athletics Hall of Fame

José Canseco Capas Jr. (born July 2, 1964) is a Cuban-American former professional baseball outfielder and designated hitter who played 17 seasons in Major League Baseball (MLB). During his time with the Oakland Athletics, he established himself as one of the premier power hitters in the game. He won the Rookie of the Year (1986), and Most Valuable Player award (1988), and was a six-time All-Star. Canseco is a two-time World Series champion with the Oakland Athletics (1989) and the New York Yankees (2000).

In 1988, Canseco became the first player in MLB history to hit 40 home runs and steal 40 bases in one season. He won the Silver Slugger Award four times: three as an American League (AL) outfielder (1988, 1990, 1991), and once as a designated hitter (1998). He ranks fourth all-time in Athletics history with 254 home runs and is one of 14 players in MLB history with 400 home runs and 200 stolen bases. Despite many injuries during the later part of his career, Canseco averaged 40 home runs, 120 runs batted in, and 102 runs scored every 162 games, playing a total of 1,887 games in 17 seasons with seven different teams. His 462 career home runs are the 12th-highest total in AL history and the 2nd most in MLB history for a player with less than 2,000 games played. For the length of his career (1985-2001) Canseco had the 3rd most home runs in all of Major League Baseball, behind only Mark McGwire (583) and Barry Bonds (567). He is the 7th lowest drafted player (15th round, 392nd pick in 1982) in MLB history ever to win an MVP Award. From the day of his debut until his last game in MLB (September 5, 1985, until his last career game on October 6, 2001), no one hit more home runs in the American League than Canseco.

Canseco admitted using performance-enhancing drugs during his major-league playing career, and in 2005 wrote a tell-all book, Juiced: Wild Times, Rampant 'Roids, Smash Hits & How Baseball Got Big, in which he said that the vast majority of MLB players use steroids. After retiring from MLB, he also competed in boxing and mixed martial arts.

== Early life ==
Canseco was born in Havana, Cuba, the son of José Sr. and Barbara Canseco. His father was Cuban while his mother was half-Cuban and half-Filipino. He has a twin brother, Ozzie Canseco, who is also a former major league player. When Fidel Castro came into power in 1959, José Sr., a territory manager for the oil and gasoline corporation Esso as well as a part-time English teacher, lost his job and eventually his home. The family was allowed to leave Cuba in 1965, when the twins were barely one year old, and settled in the Miami area, where José Sr. became a territory manager for another oil and gasoline company, Amoco.

Canseco played baseball at Miami Coral Park High School, where he failed to make the varsity team until his senior year. He was named Most Valuable Player of the junior varsity team in his junior year and of the varsity team the following year. He graduated in 1982.

== Baseball career ==
=== Minor League Baseball (1982–1985) ===
The Oakland Athletics drafted Canseco in the 15th round of the 1982 Major League Baseball draft. He made his professional baseball debut with the Miami Marlins of the Florida State League and also played Minor League Baseball with the Medford A's, Madison Muskies, Idaho Falls A's, Modesto A's, and Tacoma Tigers. Canseco started the 1985 season with the Class-AA Huntsville Stars and became known as "Parkway José" for his long home runs (25 in half a season) that went close to the Memorial Parkway behind Joe Davis Stadium. Canseco was nicknamed "The Natural", with some analysts saying he was the best prospect since Willie Mays. Oakland A's hitting coach Bob Watson said that Canseco was a mixture of Roberto Clemente, Dale Murphy, and Reggie Jackson. Others touted Canseco as the next Mickey Mantle.

=== Major League Baseball (1985–2001) ===
==== Oakland Athletics (1985–1992) ====
In 1985, Canseco won the Baseball America Minor League Player of the Year Award, and was a late "September call-up" for the Oakland Athletics. He made his Major League debut on September 2, striking out in his one at-bat against the Baltimore Orioles. His first hit was off Ron Guidry of the New York Yankees on September 7, and his first home run was off Jeff Russell of the Texas Rangers on September 9. He played in 29 games in the major leagues in 1985, batting .302 with 5 home runs and 13 RBIs in 96 at-bats. He was named Player of the Week from September 23 to 29 with a .481 BA (13 for 27), 3 HRs, and 7 RBIs in 7 games. He played both left and right field in 26 games and made 3 errors in 61 chances, with 56 putouts, 2 assists, and 1 double play. On September 26, he played 3 innings in center field, in his only career appearance in that position. For the entire 1985 year (AA, AAA, and Major League level combined), Canseco had a .330 batting average with 41 home runs, 140 runs batted in, 73 extra base hits, 336 total bases, and a .622 slugging percentage.

After being named Minor League Baseball Player of the Year and a good September call-up the prior year, Canseco was the favorite to win the American League's Rookie of the Year Award in 1986. He batted either fifth or third in the lineup and he established himself that year in his first full season as the starting left fielder for the Athletics. By the All-Star break he was leading the American League in home runs (23) and runs batted in (78) and was selected as a backup outfielder for the All-Star Game by manager Dick Howser, although he did not see any playing time in the game. An 0-for-34 batting slump in August prevented him from winning the RBI crown, finishing with 117, four fewer than league leader Joe Carter. He led the league in outfielder errors with 14 and was third with 175 strikeouts. Nonetheless, his 33 home runs (4th in the AL), 117 RBIs, 29 doubles, and 15 stolen bases helped him win the American League Rookie of the Year award, defeating California Angels first baseman Wally Joyner. He also finished 20th in the American League MVP ballot.

In 1987, first baseman Mark McGwire joined Canseco on the Athletics, as an everyday player. In that roster the A's also had veteran slugger Reggie Jackson, Canseco's childhood hero, playing in his last MLB season. The three sluggers combined for 95 home runs, led by McGwire’s 49 that set the rookie record. McGwire was also named the American League Rookie of the Year. Together, Canseco and McGwire formed a fearsome offensive tandem, later known as the "Bash Brothers". Canseco followed his rookie season with a similar offensive performance in 1987. He improved his batting average from .240 in 1986 to .257 in 1987, hitting 31 home runs, 113 runs batted in (6th in the AL), and 35 doubles (10th) in 691 at-bats (9th), while missing only 3 games the entire season. He was also 5th in the league in strikeouts, with 157. In the outfield, Canseco improved his performance compared to 1986. Playing left field the entire year, he was among the league leaders in this position with a .976 fielding average (3rd), 267 putouts (2nd), 12 assists (3rd), and 3 double plays (1st). He only committed 7 errors, half of what he made the previous year. He finished 23rd in the MVP ballot. Canseco combined with McGwire for a total of 80 home runs and 236 runs batted in, making the young pair (Canseco was 22 years old and McGwire 23) the most spectacular batting duo in the upcoming years, drawing comparisons to the likes of Mickey Mantle/Roger Maris, Willie Mays/Willie McCovey, and Hank Aaron/Eddie Mathews.

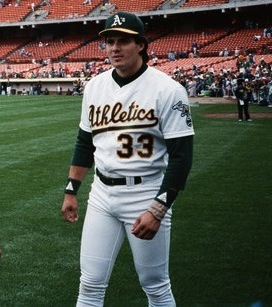
Canseco with the A's in 1989

During the preseason of 1988, Canseco guaranteed he would hit at least 40 home runs and steal at least 40 bases in the upcoming season. The Athletics lineup featured established players with a lot of experience like former MVPs Dave Parker and Don Baylor, as well as outfielder Dave Henderson, and third baseman Carney Lansford, that complemented McGwire and Canseco in the middle of the batting order. After alternating between batting second and third in the lineup for the first 10 games of the season, he was inserted in the number 3 spot for the rest of the season. He also moved from left to right field. Canseco hit a home run on Opening Day against the Seattle Mariners and had his first stolen base of the season. During the first 40 games of the season, he hit for a .300 batting average with 10 home runs and 15 stolen bases. His first multi-home run game was on July 3 against the Toronto Blue Jays at Exhibition Stadium during a 16-inning contest in which Canseco had a 3-for-7 performance, with 3 home runs and 6 runs batted in. By the All-Star break, he had 24 home runs (1st in the American League), 22 stolen bases, and 67 RBIs (2nd in the AL). He was selected by fans to the All-Star Game as one of the starting outfielders, batting fourth in the lineup. On July 31, he had his second and last multi-home run game of the year against the Seattle Mariners, hitting 2 homers. On September 18, he hit his 40th home run of the year against the Kansas City Royals in front of the Oakland crowd. Five days later against the Milwaukee Brewers, Canseco stole 2 bases, the second one coming after his first bunt of the season, to become the first 40-40 player in Major League history. With a .393/.446/.753 slash line, 8 home runs, and 24 RBIs in 24 games for the month, he was named the American League's Player of the Month for September. A well-rounded team with lots of power, great starting and relief pitching, and a sound defense, the Oakland Athletics finished the season with a major league-best 104 wins and swept the Boston Red Sox in 4 games in the ALCS. For the series, Canseco had a .313 batting average and hit home runs in games one, two, and four, and all of them either tied the game or gave the Athletics the lead, but the ALCS MVP Award went to reliever Dennis Eckersley who had 4 saves in 4 chances. The A's met the Los Angeles Dodgers in the World Series, a matchup that featured the leading candidate to win the American League MVP Award facing the eventual National League Cy Young Award winner, Orel Hershiser. The Dodgers prevailed, upsetting the A's in five games. Canseco hit a grand slam in Game 1 during his first official World Series at-bat (though his second plate appearance, after he was hit by a pitch in the first inning), tying Gene Tenace for the Athletics’ franchise record of most home runs in a single postseason with 4, but it would be his only hit in the Series. He was unanimously named the American League's Most Valuable Player in 1988 (making him the seventh player in league history to win the award unanimously) with a .307 batting average, 120 runs scored (second in the league), and 347 total bases (2nd), and leading the major leagues with 76 extra-base hits, 124 RBIs, 42 home runs, a .569 slugging percentage, and a 14.5 home run per at-bat ratio. His 40 stolen bases were the fourth highest in the league. 27 of his 42 home runs of the season either tied the game or gave the Athletics the lead. He also won his first Silver Slugger Award. He was exclusively a right fielder during the year, playing in 144 games on defense, committing 7 errors in 322 chances, and had 304 putouts for a .978 fielding percentage. He was third in the league in outfielder assists with 11.

In 1989, Canseco missed the first 88 games of the regular season because of a broken wrist during the preseason. Despite not playing a single game in the first half of the year, he was voted as one of the starting outfielders for the American League All-Star team. Unable to play he was replaced in the lineup by Rangers outfielder Rubén Sierra. Canseco returned immediately after the All-Star break, hitting an opposite-field home run against the Toronto Blue Jays in his first game of the season. He hit 5 home runs in his first 35 at bats (10 games), but only 2 in the following 20 games. After finding his rhythm at the plate, Canseco finished the season strong, hitting .286 with 10 home runs, 33 hits, and 33 RBIs in his last 30 games of the year. He managed to hit 17 home runs with 57 RBIs in barely 65 games played for the entire season, a pace equal to 40+ home runs and 130+ RBIs had he played a full season. The Athletics won the AL West and their first World Series since 1974, beating the San Francisco Giants in four games. Canseco had a solid postseason, batting .323 and hitting 2 home runs including one in the ALCS against the Blue Jays that reached the upper deck of the SkyDome. Against the Giants, in the World Series, he hit for a .357 average with a home run in Game 3. The 1989 Series was interrupted before Game 3 by a major earthquake in the San Francisco Bay Area.

As the reigning World Series Champs, the Oakland Athletics were favorites to repeat, and they were hopeful that Canseco would remain healthy throughout the 1990 season. In May, he was named the American League's Player of the Month for the second time in his career, after hitting .353 in 27 games with 13 home runs and 35 runs batted in. Canseco started to have back problems, an issue that would become recurrent in his career. Despite missing over 20 games due to injury during the first part of the season, he received a then-record 5-year, $23.5-million dollar contract, making him the highest paid player in Major League history and the first ever to make at least $4 million in a year, averaging $4.7 million per season. On May 22, Canseco hit his first regular-season grand slam of his career against the Toronto Blue Jays. By the All-Star break, he had played in only 64 games, hitting .293 with 22 home runs (6 behind the American League leader Cecil Fielder). Canseco was selected to start in the All-Star Game for the third consecutive year, this time with the most fan votes in the American League. On July 18, his twin brother Ozzie Canseco made his major league debut. During a July 24 game against the California Angels, both José and Ozzie had line drive hits to left field off pitcher Jim Abbott and both were thrown out at second base by left fielder Max Venable, trying to extend a single in to a double. Although he hit 15 home runs in 69 games during the second half, Canseco was not as productive as the first part of the year. He missed another 11 games late in the season, and at times he was coming off the bench as a pinch hitter. From August 1 until the end of the regular season, he hit .220 with 5 homers, 24 RBIs, and 60 strikeouts in 47 games, while battling with a back injury. He finished 3rd in the league with 37 home runs, behind Fielder (51) and teammate Mark McGwire (39). In 131 games, he had 101 runs batted in and 19 stolen bases. It was the fourth time in 5 years that he had 100+ RBIs. For the season, he played in 43 games as the designated hitter and only 88 in right field, making only one error in 189 chances during the year. The Oakland A's won their division with a league-best 103 wins and were the favorites to win the World Series. Canseco had a discreet ALCS, hitting .182 (2-for-11) with 5 strikeouts, but the A's swept the Boston Red Sox 4 games to 0, and moved on to play in their third World Series in a row, this time against the Cincinnati Reds. Canseco struggled both at the plate and in the outfield, missing on two key plays in Game 2. In the same game, he had his only hit of the series, a 2-run home run against Danny Jackson, to set a franchise record with the 7th postseason home run of his career. After going 0 for 4 in Game 3, and 1 for 11 in the series, Canseco was benched in Game 4. Manager Tony LaRussa cited Canseco's sore back and injured middle finger as the reasons for taking him out of the lineup, but there was speculation that his own teammates requested LaRussa to bench Canseco due to his poor outfield performance and struggles at the plate. Down 2 runs to 1 and facing elimination in Game 4, Canseco entered as a pinch hitter in the bottom of the 9th, but he grounded out to third for the second out of the inning. One batter later, the Reds completed the sweep over a heavily favored Oakland team. At the end of the year, Canseco won his second Silver Slugger Award and finished 12th in the AL MVP ballot.

Canseco continued to be productive the following year and for the first time since 1988, completely healthy. By the All-Star break of the 1991 season, he was leading the league with 21 home runs (tied with Cecil Fielder) and had 63 RBIs, but inexplicably did not receive All-Star Game consideration by either the fans or as a reserve player, as his own A's skipper Tony LaRussa, managing the AL for the 3rd straight year, did not select him as a substitute. Fans instead voted Athletics outfielder Dave Henderson, who had far lesser offensive numbers than Canseco, and LaRussa selected Kirby Puckett, Joe Carter, and Rubén Sierra as the reserve outfielders. Canseco not being selected by his own manager despite leading the league in home runs and having his best season in three years, led many to believe that the relationship between Canseco and LaRussa had started to deteriorate. His best month that season was July, hitting 10 home runs in 27 games (1 every 11.1 at-bats) with a .315 batting average. He finished the 1991 season batting .266 with 44 home runs, earning the second home run crown of his career (tied with Detroit's Cecil Fielder), 122 RBIs, 26 stolen bases, and a .556 slugging percentage. He led the AL with a home run every 13.0 at bats, while finishing 4th in the MVP ballot. He won his third Silver Slugger Award in four years. Towards the end of the season, there were mixed opinions from the Oakland fans in regards to Canseco; some would boo him but others showed support by cheering in games at the Oakland Coliseum. During a home game on September 20, and after rumors that he was on his way out of Oakland, he received a standing ovation by the fans. Canseco responded with his 42nd home run of the season against the Toronto Blue Jays, tying his career-best. The Athletics, however, missed the playoffs for the first time in three years, finishing 4th in the AL West.

The Athletics returned to contention in 1992, and despite missing 24 of the A's games in the first half, Canseco hit 18 home runs (in 249 at-bats) by the All-Star break, and he was voted to start his 4th All-Star Game in 5 years, though he was unable to play due to a sore right shoulder and was replaced with Joe Carter.

At this point during his tenure with the A's, from 1986 to 1992, and despite missing roughly 120 games between 1989 and 1990 and about 20 more during the first half of the 1992 season, Canseco averaged 32 home runs a year and hit 100+ RBIs five times. He also averaged 40 home runs, 125 RBIs, and 22 stolen bases per every 162 games played; captured AL Rookie of the Year honors, two home run titles, an MVP award, three Silver Slugger Awards, three American League Pennants, and a World Series ring. He was selected to five All-Star Games in his first 7 full Major League seasons. In the six years between 1986 and 1991, he finished in the top four in the American League home run leaderboard 4 times. He hit 231 home runs from 1985 to 1992 for the A's, putting him 2nd all-time behind Reggie Jackson since the Athletics moved to Oakland in 1968. His 7 career postseason home runs and 18 runs batted in are both the all-time record for the franchise (1901–2025).

==== Texas Rangers (1992–1994) ====
On August 31, 1992, in the bottom of the first inning of a game vs the Baltimore Orioles, and while Canseco was in the on-deck circle, the A's traded him to the Texas Rangers for Rubén Sierra, Jeff Russell, Bobby Witt, and cash. At the moment of the trade, Canseco was batting .243 with 22 home runs and 72 RBIs in 97 games, and the A's were leading the American League West Division by 6.5 games. The Oakland front office was looking to fortify their pitching down the stretch. A's general manager Sandy Alderson announced the trade while the Athletics were still playing the Orioles that night. The trade caught Canseco, the fans, the media, and people throughout Major League Baseball all by surprise, as Canseco was considered at the time the best player in baseball, but was also the most scrutinized. From 1986 until the date of the trade, no other player had hit more home runs (226) in the major leagues. In Texas, Canseco joined Latino stars Rafael Palmeiro, Juan González, and Iván Rodríguez. He had a good start with the Rangers, hitting .367 (11-for-30) with 3 home runs and 11 RBIs in his first 8 games, but had only 6 hits and one home run in his last 43 at-bats, averaging .140. Despite missing nearly 50 games to injuries and the trade to the Rangers, Canseco managed to hit 26 home runs (7th in the AL) and had 87 runs batted in, playing 115 games in 1992 for the Athletics and the Rangers. From 1985, the year he debuted with the A's, until the end of 1992, Canseco's 235 home runs were the most by any major league player. At the end of the 1992 season, the Oakland A's would go on to lose the American League Championship Series to the Toronto Blue Jays 4 games to 2. Since winning the 1990 ALCS, the A's would not win a playoff series for another 16 seasons.

Canseco started the 1993 season relatively healthy, playing in all of the Rangers' games in the first quarter of the season (45 games). Although hitting only a home run every 20 at bats, he had 44 hits, 12 doubles, 7 home runs and 38 RBIs in the first 36 games he played, while batting .306 in that span. On April 25, he became the first player since Ted Williams in 1947 to reach 750 RBIs in less than 1,000 games played. On May 26, 1993, during a game against the Cleveland Indians, Carlos Martínez hit a fly ball that Canseco lost sight of as he was crossing the warning track. The ball hit him on the head and bounced over the wall for a home run. The cap Canseco was wearing on that play, which This Week in Baseball rated in 1998 as the greatest blooper of the show's first 21 years, is in the collection of ESPN journalist Keith Olbermann. Three days later, on May 29, Canseco asked his manager, Kevin Kennedy, to let him pitch the eighth inning of a runaway loss to the Boston Red Sox. In his inning-long pitching appearance, he injured his arm. He was out of the lineup from May 31 until June 10. He played in another 15 games after his pitching outing against Boston but he was shut down on June 23 due to arm discomfort, requiring Tommy John surgery and missing the remainder of the season. He finished the 1993 season hitting .256 with 10 home runs and 46 RBIs in 60 games.

In the strike-shortened 1994 season, Canseco again returned to his former status as a power hitter. Throughout the season, he was amongst the American League leaders in home runs, while playing exclusively as a designated hitter. On April 20, he hit the 250th home run of his career, making him the 16th player with that total before age 30. From June 3 to the 13th, he batted .559 (19-for-34) with 8 home runs and 20 runs batted in. In the last game of that span, he set career-highs for a single game with 5 hits, 8 RBIs, and 3 home runs (tying a career-high), including a grand slam against the Seattle Mariners. During Kenny Rogers' perfect game on July 28, Canseco went 2-for-4 with 2 solo home runs in the 4–0 victory over the California Angels. He finished the season with 31 home runs (4th in the AL), 90 RBIs (7th), a .552 Slugging Percentage (7), and hitting a home run every 13.8 at-bats (5th) while playing in 111 of the Rangers' 114 games. He also stole 15 bases, posted a .282 batting average, led the league with 20 GIDP (ground into double-play), and was second in the league with 114 strikeouts. Canseco was on pace to set career highs in home runs (45), runs batted in (130) and runs scored (127) when the players' strike started on August 12. He was named The Sporting News Comeback Player of the Year and finished in 11th place in the AL MVP voting.

Playing for the Texas Rangers, Canseco hit 45 home runs (averaging 37 per every 162 games played), 136 runs batted in, 23 stolen bases, 118 runs scored, and 180 hits in 171 games played, for a .273/.360/.515 slash line and 197 strikeouts.

==== Boston Red Sox (1995–1996) ====
After playing with the Rangers for a little over two years, Canseco was traded on December 9 to the Boston Red Sox for Otis Nixon and Luis Ortiz, where he joined 1986 AL MVP Roger Clemens and eventual 1995 MVP Mo Vaughn. He once again battled injuries, missing 50 games during the first half of the year. However, from July 1 until the end of the season, he had a .387 batting average (122-for-315) with 21 home runs and 66 RBIs in 79 games. From August 27 to September 15, he had the longest hitting streak of his career, hitting safely in 17 games (he had a hit in 24 of his last 28 games of the year). At the end of the regular season, he had 24 home runs with a .306 batting average, his highest since 1988. His last home run of the 1995 season against Jesse Orosco was the 300th of his career. The Red Sox captured the AL East Division title to advance to the ALDS, making it Canseco's first postseason in five years. The Red Sox were swept by the Cleveland Indians in the American League Division Series 3 games to 0. In Game 2, Canseco once again faced pitcher Orel Hershiser, going 0-for-3 with a strikeout. Dating back to the 1988 World Series, Canseco was 0-for-11 lifetime with 3 strikeouts against Hershiser in 3 postseason matchups. After playing the entire 1994 season and all but one game in the 1995 season as a designated hitter, Canseco was the starting right fielder during Game 3 of the American League Division Series. 1995 was the last year of the five-year contract he signed with the Athletics in 1990. According to the Baseball-Reference website, Canseco had the highest yearly salary of his career, making a total of $5.8 million for the 1995 season.

Canseco had a great first half of the 1996 season, hitting 26 home runs by the All-Star break, 4th in AL at that point behind Brady Anderson (30), McGwire (28) and Albert Belle (27). Between May 18 and June 29, he had a .306 BA with 19 home runs, and 44 RBIs in only 39 games. He was sidelined on July 25 once again due to injury, missing nearly 50 games. He returned to the lineup on September 17 but hit only 2 home runs the rest of the season. He finished the year with a .289/.400/.589 slash line with 28 home runs, 82 runs batted in, and 22 doubles in 96 games. He played in the outfield in 12 games. After the 1996 season, the Red Sox fired manager Kevin Kennedy and Canseco requested a trade out of Boston.

Although productive when he was in the lineup, Canseco missed over 120 games during his two-year tenure with Boston, playing in only 102 and 96 games in 1995 and 1996. He averaged 184 hits, 43 home runs, 134 RBIs, 108 runs, 39 doubles, a .289 batting average, and a slugging percentage of .571 per every 162 games played with the Red Sox.

==== Oakland Athletics (1997) ====
In January 1997, he was traded to the Oakland Athletics for pitcher John Wasdin. The day after the news of his return to Oakland, the A's front office informed him that ticket sales for the day were the highest in over three years, mainly because of the Bash Brothers reunion with first baseman Mark McGwire, the only remaining member of the A’s team that reached three World Series in a row. Now age 31 and after battling injuries in Boston, Canseco had a promising first half of the season health wise, playing in 83 of Oakland's 89 games, with more than half of those as an outfielder. He had 18 home runs and 57 RBIs by the All-Star break (on pace for 35 homers and 110 RBIs for the entire season), but he suffered a back injury yet again, keeping him on the disabled list and missing 15 games in July and August. He returned to action on August 20, but with the Athletics organization wanting to focus on developing young talent, and with the Bash Brothers reunion losing its appeal with the trade of Mark McGwire to the St. Louis Cardinals at the trade deadline, Canseco ended his season on August 26, missing the last 30 games of the season. In Canseco's eyes, he was shut down by the front office to prevent him from getting the minimum plate appearances that would trigger the renewal of his contract for the following year. He finished the season with a .235 average, the lowest of his career, but with 23 home runs and 74 runs batted in 388 at-bats. His home run against the Red Sox on August 20 gave him a career total of 254 in an Athletics uniform, placing him 4th all-time behind Reggie Jackson (269), Jimmie Foxx (302), and McGwire (363). After three seasons of playing exclusively as a DH, Canseco saw considerably more action in the outfield, playing 46 of his 108 games in left or right field. At the end of 1997 Canseco was amongst the franchise's leaders in home runs, runs batted in (6th, 793), slugging percentage (6th, .507), OPS (8th, .851) and strikeouts (2nd, 1096).

==== Toronto Blue Jays (1998) ====
In 1998, Canseco signed a $2.1 million contract on February 4 with the Toronto Blue Jays, joining former Red Sox teammate Roger Clemens in Toronto. He continued to have more action in the outfield, playing a total of 76 games in both left and right field and finishing the season with a .960 fielding average, committing 5 errors in 126 chances. At the plate, Canseco had a productive season again, finishing the first half of the season with 24 home runs, 21 stolen bases, and 48 RBIs. For the first time in his career, he was issued a jersey number other than 33, wearing number 44 for the first part of the season. (After Ed Sprague was traded to Oakland, Canseco switched back to number 33.) During the second half of the season, the Blue Jays instructed Canseco to reduce his attempts to steal bases, causing him to finish one steal shy of another 30–30 season. On July 19, he hit home runs number 25 and 26 against the Yankees and Andy Pettitte, including the sixth grand slam of his career. On July 26th against Boston, Canseco hit his 29th home run of the season and 380th of his career, making him the all-time home run leader for players born outside the United States. Since he has been surpassed by 9 other players. He finished the 1998 season having played 151 games, his highest in 6 years, with a career-high 46 home runs (third in the AL), 107 RBIs, 29 stolen bases, and 98 runs scored, but a .237 batting average. He also led the league with 159 strikeouts. He earned his fourth career Silver Slugger Award, his first as a designated hitter. The Blue Jays made a minimal effort to retain Canseco after the season, offering him a one-year contract worth just over a million dollars for the following season. Canseco declined the offer and became a free agent on October 22.

==== Final seasons (1999–2001) ====
Despite hitting a career-high 46 home runs in 1998, the 33-year-old Canseco, looking for a team in search of a DH, drew very little attention in the free agent market. On December 10th, 1998 signed a one-year contract with the Tampa Bay Devil Rays worth $3.3 million with incentives to be their Designated Hitter at age 34 for the 1999 season. According to Canseco, the contract included a clause stating that if he was elected to the Hall of Fame, he would be depicted as a member of the Devil Rays. That year, he came out of the gate swinging, hitting a home run on Opening Day and reaching a total of 10 home runs by the end of April. On April 14 he hit home run number 400 of his career against Toronto's Kelvim Escobar. From May 16 to 21, he hit a home run in five consecutive games, the second-longest streak in Tampa Bay history. In his first 60 games played, he hit 25 home runs, batting .306 with a .690 slugging percentage. On pace for a 60+ home run season, he was voted to the All-Star team as the starting DH for the American League (Tampa Bay's first position player ever to be selected to the All-Star Game), making it his first selection in seven years. By the All-Star break, Canseco was leading the American League with 31 home runs, while playing in 82 games during the first half of the season, and became the 14th player in MLB history to hit 30+ home runs before the All-Star break. However, he injured his back days before the mid-summer classic and missed the game, and was replaced by Rafael Palmeiro. He also missed the Home Run Derby at Boston's Fenway Park and the chance to compete against Bash Brother Mark McGwire. He had back surgery and was expected to miss the rest of the season. With a remarkable recovery, he came back into action on August 20, less than a month and a half after his back operation. After his return, Canseco was hitting .315 with only 2 home runs but had 18 RBIs and 23 hits in his first 20 games back. Although he only hit 3 more home runs in 115 at-bats after his injury, he had a .287 batting average with 26 RBIs and 33 hits in his last 31 games of the year. He finished the season with 34 home runs and 95 RBIs with a .276 batting average and was 3rd in the American League in At Bats per Home Run with 12.6 and ninth in slugging percentage with .563.

Despite missing around 350 games since 1990, mostly due to injuries, by the end of 1999, Canseco had a total of 303 home runs in 1,145 games, which placed him eighth in the majors during the 1990s. In 5 seasons during the 90's, he was in the Top-10 list for home run hitters in the American League.

In February 2000, before the start of spring training for the following MLB season, Canseco played in the MLBPA-organized Big League Challenge home run derby in Las Vegas at Cashman Field. He competed against a field of 12 that included notable sluggers such as Mark McGwire, Barry Bonds, Sammy Sosa, and Mike Piazza. Canseco won the tournament, defeating Rafael Palmeiro in the final.

The Devil Rays re-signed Canseco for the 2000 season on a $3-million contract. The Devil Rays traded for third baseman Vinny Castilla and signed Greg Vaughn as a free agent to complement Fred McGriff and Canseco in the lineup. However, injuries caused the Tampa Bay front office to disband the quartet after the trade deadline. The first half of the season was one of the most difficult in Canseco's career. Bothered by a foot injury, he was put on the 15-day disabled list on May 25 and he ended up missing 41 of the team's 85 games up to the All-Star break. Canseco ended his Tampa Bay tenure on August 7th when he was claimed off waivers by the New York Yankees. In one and a half seasons with the Devil Rays, Canseco had a slash line of .272/.373/.525 with 43 home runs, 33 doubles, 125 runs batted in, 77 extra base hits for a total of 176 hits in 174 games. At the time of the waivers' claim, Canseco's 440 career home runs were the most ever for any player acquired by the Yankees. The move to the Yankees caught many, including Yankees manager Joe Torre, off guard, as the Yankees had other players at the time who fulfilled similar roles, such as Dave Justice and Glenallen Hill. Yankees General Manager Brian Cashman made the claim to prevent the Athletics, Red Sox, and Blue Jays, who were in a close race with the Yankees, from acquiring Canseco.

On August 10th, during his first game in the starting lineup with the Yankees, batting fourth as the DH, Canseco went 2-for-2 with a walk, a home run, 2 sacrifice flies, and 3 RBIs. He hit .243 with 6 home runs and 19 RBIs in 37 games for the Yankees, splitting duties as a DH, outfielder, and pinch hitter. For the entire season, he had 15 home runs and 49 RBIs in 329 at-bats. The Yankees won the AL East, but Canseco was not on the team's roster for the Division Series or the ALCS. He was, however, included in the final roster for the World Series against the New York Mets. During the sixth inning of Game 4 of the World Series, manager Joe Torre noticed that no right-handed pitcher was warming up in the Mets bullpen, and with pitcher David Cone next to bat, Torre sent Canseco to the plate to face left-handed Glendon Rusch as a pinch hitter (his most recent World Series at-bat was also as a pinch hitter in Game 4 of the 1990 World Series, exactly 10 years prior). The game was the first in which Canseco had played in 24 days, and he struck out. The Yankees won the series 4 games to 1 and Canseco earned his second World Series ring. Canseco later called his Yankees tenure "the worst time of [his] life" due to receiving limited playing time. His short stint with the Yankees marked the third time he was Roger Clemens' teammate, a fact later magnified by the media due to the steroid controversy, the Mitchell Report, and the infamous pool party at Canseco's house two years prior while both played with the Blue Jays. In November, the Yankees declined Canseco's $5-million option and paid the $500,000 buyout, with Canseco becoming a free agent.

On January 16, 2001, the Anaheim Angels signed Canseco to an incentive-laden deal heavily based on plate appearances. On February 11th, Canseco once again participated in the Big League Challenge home run derby competition. He made it to the final for second year in a row, this time narrowly losing to fellow Cuban slugger Rafael Palmeiro.

During Spring Training and after only 39 at-bats in which he hit .231 and no home runs, the Angels cut Canseco. He lost the Anaheim DH spot to Glenallen Hill, with whom he shared at-bats for the Yankees the year prior. Hill ended up being released by the Angels in June, after hitting .136 with 1 home run in 16 games for the 2001 season, his last in the majors. Canseco spent half of the season with the Newark Bears of the independent Atlantic League, alongside his twin brother Ozzie Canseco. Jose was batting .284/.459/.507 with 7 home runs, 27 runs batted in and 10 stolen bases in 41 games before joining the Chicago White Sox on June 21st to replace Frank Thomas as the everyday designated hitter. Wearing jersey number 31 during his first game back in the majors since the 2000 World Series, he went 1-for-5 with a double as the DH, hitting fifth in the lineup. He had 3 RBIs in his second game of the season. His first home run came on June 26th against the Minnesota Twins. During the season he had two 2-homer games, one on July 8th and another on August 1st. He finished the season playing in 76 games, hitting 16 home runs and 49 RBIs in only 256 at-bats, a pace of 30+ home runs and 100+ RBIs had he played the entire season. His last home run of the season was the 462nd for his career, and came against Mike Mussina of the New York Yankees, putting Canseco just 38 home runs away from reaching the 500-home run milestone, at age 37.

In the spring of 2002, Canseco was signed to a minor league contract by the Montreal Expos, who were at the time owned by Major League Baseball and had Omar Minaya as general manager and Frank Robinson as manager. Despite making only 13 appearances in the outfield in the previous three years, he was expected to be the Expos' left fielder, and the designated hitter during interleague play, in what would have been Canseco's first time playing for a National League club. He played 14 spring training games, batting .200 with 3 home runs (tied for the team lead) and 5 RBIs. However, he was again released prior to the regular season start, this time four days before Opening Day. The Expos invited Canseco to be part of their Triple-A team, but he declined the offer. With Opening Day scheduled for March 31st, Canseco did not find a team looking for a DH and signed a minor league contract with a White Sox affiliate, the Charlotte Knights, for whom he hit .172 with 5 home runs in 18 minor league games. Only 38 home runs shy of 500 for his career, Canseco officially announced his retirement from Major League Baseball on May 13th, 2002. At the time of his retirement, Canseco had 1,942 career strikeouts, second all-time only to Reggie Jackson. By the end of the 2025 season, he is 11th on the all-time list for hitters with the most strikeouts.

At 39 years old he made a brief comeback attempt in 2004, attending an open tryout with the Los Angeles Dodgers, but was not offered a spot with the team nor with any of their minor league affiliates.

=== Independent League career (2006–2018) ===
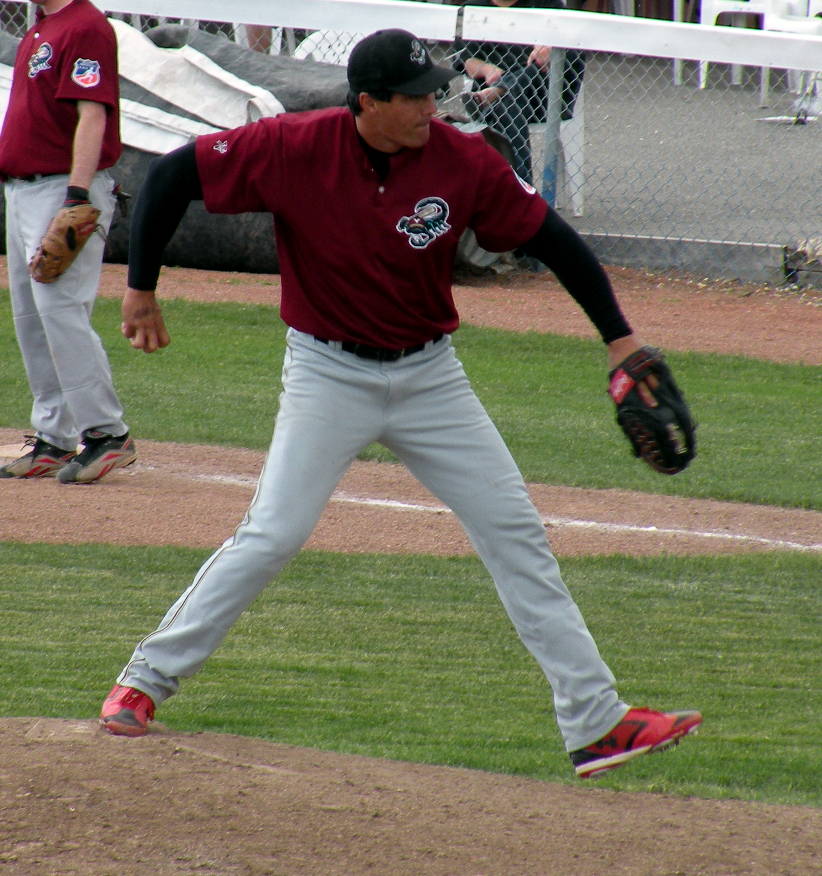
Canseco pitching for the Yuma Scorpions

On June 29, 2006, the independent Golden Baseball League announced that Canseco had agreed to a contract to play with the San Diego Surf Dawgs. After playing one game for the Surf Dawgs, Canseco was traded to the Long Beach Armada on July 5, 2006. He requested the trade due to "family obligations." On July 31, 2006, Canseco won the Golden Baseball League's Home Run Derby.

Canseco signed a short team deal with the Laredo Broncos of the United Baseball League on August 14, 2010. He served as bench coach and designated hitter.

On April 11, 2011, Canseco signed a deal as a player/manager for the Yuma Scorpions of the North American League. At the age of 46, he played 64 out of 88 games and batted .258 with 8 home runs and 46 RBIs. He was not the oldest player on the team: his twin brother Ozzie appeared in 12 games, mostly as a designated hitter, and 52-year-old Tony Phillips appeared in 24 games, mostly as a third baseman. Canseco joined the Quintana Roo Tigres of the Mexican League in 2012, but was reportedly banned for using testosterone. During his tryout, he went 4 for 11 with a home run, 4 RBI and 3 walks. After the series, he gave himself the nickname El Cubano Cañonero ("the Cuban Cannon").

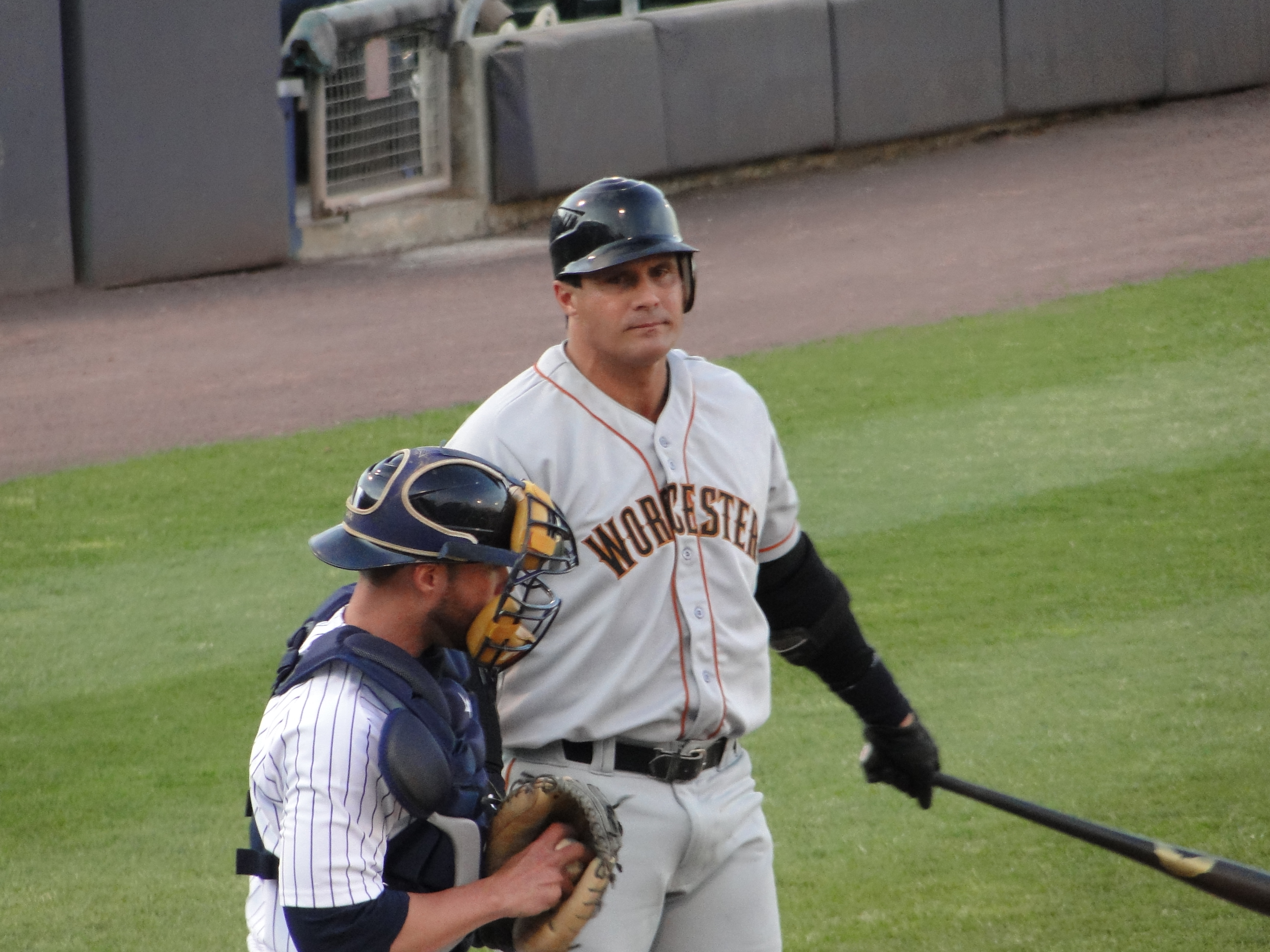
Canseco batting as a member of the Worcester Tornadoes in 2012

On April 20, 2012, the Worcester Tornadoes of the Canadian American Association of Professional Baseball announced that they had signed Canseco to a one-season contract for a salary of one thousand dollars a month. In the beginning of August 2012, Canseco left the Tornadoes due to concerns of not receiving his salary, a conflict which led him to sue the team. Canseco quickly signed with the Rio Grande Valley WhiteWings of the North American League. However, his debut was delayed due to a family emergency.

In early 2013 Canseco played in the Texas Winter League but was only 3-for-16 at the plate. He signed with the Fort Worth Cats of the United League to start the 2013 season.

In 2015, 2016, and 2017, Canseco had short playing stints in the Pacific Association, mostly with the Pittsburg Diamonds. Although he has not played Major League Baseball since 2001, Canseco has played for numerous minor-league teams over the years, most recently in 2018, when he was 53 years of age, for the Normal CornBelters of the Independent Frontier League. In recent years, he has usually played just a few games per season, but in 2011, he played 64 out of 88 games for the Yuma Scorpions of the North American League. Canseco played 30 seasons of professional baseball over a span of 36 years between 1982 and 2018.

=== Amateur Adult Baseball (2011 and 2016) ===
In March 2011, Canseco played a few games with the Valley Rays in the Pacific Coast Baseball League in Los Angeles.

In May 2016, Canseco appeared for the SoCal Glory in the 35+ MSBL Las Vegas Open – National Tournament.

== Performance-enhancing drugs ==
In 2005, Canseco admitted to using anabolic steroids in a tell-all book, Juiced: Wild Times, Rampant 'Roids, Smash Hits & How Baseball Got Big. Canseco also claimed that up to 85% of major league players took steroids, a figure disputed by many in the game. In the book, Canseco specifically identified former teammates Mark McGwire, Rafael Palmeiro, Jason Giambi, Iván Rodríguez, and Juan González as fellow steroid users, and admitted that he injected them. Most of the players named in the book initially denied steroid use, though Giambi admitted to steroid use in testimony before a grand jury investigating the BALCO case and on January 11, 2010, McGwire admitted publicly to using steroids.

At a Congressional hearing on the subject of steroids in sports, Palmeiro categorically denied using performance-enhancing drugs (PEDs), while McGwire repeatedly refused to answer questions on his own suspected use, saying he "didn't want to talk about the past". Canseco's book became a New York Times bestseller. On August 1, 2005, Palmeiro was suspended for 10 days by MLB after testing positive for steroids.

On December 13, 2007, Canseco was cited in the Mitchell Report. On December 20 Canseco was also named in Jason Grimsley's unsealed affidavit as a user of steroids. Canseco and Grimsley were teammates on the 2000 New York Yankees.

On December 30, 2007, it was announced that Canseco had reached a deal for his sequel to Juiced. The sequel, Vindicated, was released in March 2008. This book has information on Alex Rodriguez and Albert Belle, as suggested by Canseco. Canseco said the book was a "clarification" of names that should have been mentioned in the Mitchell Report.

In 2010, Canseco spoke out against PEDs advocating baseball's youth to not try them, and criticized their effectiveness overall:

"These kids don't need steroids to become players...we overemphasize the steroids and not the athletic ability and skills of these people. We're taking away the hard work the athlete puts in and saying he became great just because of steroids. Let me give you a perfect example. I have an identical twin brother, Ozzie. He is the closest thing to me genetically. And in my prime, I was a super athlete." "My twin brother used the same chemicals, same workouts, the same nutrition. Why didn't he make it in the big leagues? That is the perfect example that we are giving steroids way too much credit. If steroids are that great, it would have made him a superstar."

In a 2012 Sportsnet Interview article, Canseco said one of his only seasons without performance-enhancing drugs was in 1998 with the Toronto Blue Jays because he was in the process of a divorce and "didn't want to use steroids while handling breakup-induced depression".

== Outside baseball ==
While still a player, he was a guest star on The Simpsons in Homer at the Bat and Nash Bridges. Since his retirement, Canseco has appeared on Late Show with David Letterman, 60 Minutes, The Big Idea with Donny Deutsch, Boomer and Carton, The Howard Stern Show, Jimmy Kimmel Live!, CMI: The Chris Myers Interview, and Kathy Griffin: My Life on the D-List. In 2003, he was featured in the reality-TV special Stripper's Ball: Jenna Jameson with Dennis Rodman and Magic Johnson. He was a cast member in Season 5 of The Surreal Life with Janice Dickinson, Pepa of Salt-N-Pepa, Bronson Pinchot, Omarosa Manigault-Stallworth, Caprice Bourret, and Carey Hart. Canseco has a film cameo playing himself in the 2017 basketball drama Slamma Jamma as a judge in a slam dunk competition.

In 2007, he received 6 Hall of Fame votes. This accounted for 1.1% of the ballots, failing to reach the 5% threshold necessary to stay on the ballot for another year. However, he can be elected to the Hall of Fame by the Committee of Baseball Veterans.

In 2008, Philadelphia sportscaster and former NFL football player Vai Sikahema accepted a challenge from Canseco. The fight took place on July 12 in Atlantic City at the Bernie Robbins stadium. The 5 ft 9 in (1.75 m) Sikahema knocked out the 6 ft 4 in (1.93 m) Canseco in the first round. Canseco earned $35,000 for the fight.

On January 24, 2009, Canseco fought radio personality and former child actor Danny Bonaduce in Aston Township, Pennsylvania; the three-round match ended in a majority draw.

Canseco claims to hold black belts in karate and taekwondo, and to practice Muay Thai, as well as describing himself as "an expert with nunchakus". He made his mixed martial arts debut at Dream 9 on May 26, 2009, where he fought 7 ft 2 in (2.18 m) kickboxer Hong-man Choi as part of Dream's Super Hulk Tournament. Canseco would lose the fight after slipping, and tapping out to Choi's ground and pound.

On November 6, 2009, Canseco defeated Todd Poulton in a Celebrity Boxing Federation bout in Springfield, Massachusetts. On December 2010, he launched a Twitter campaign in hopes of getting invited to spring training by Mets GM Sandy Alderson.

Beginning March 6, 2011, Canseco was a contestant on The Celebrity Apprentice. He quit the show on April 3, 2011, citing his father's ailing health. Canseco later announced on Twitter that his father died shortly after he left the show. Canseco did earn $25,000 for his charity, the Baseball Assistance Team.

In 2012, Canseco accepted a home run derby challenge by Canadian semi-pro baseball player Evan Malamud, father of 3 boys on the autism spectrum, as part of a fundraiser for an initiative called Home Runs For Autism.

He wrote several columns for Vice in 2012.

In May 2013, Canseco provided the foreword to the novel Air Force Gator 2: Scales of Justice by Dan Ryckert. Canseco wrote that the book about an alcoholic alligator pilot is a "weakly veiled" metaphor for his own life.

On October 28, 2014, Canseco accidentally shot himself on his left hand and injured one of his fingers while attempting to clean his gun at home in Las Vegas, Nevada. During surgery, doctors were able reattach his finger with a piece of bone from his hip.

Canseco was portrayed by Andy Samberg in The Unauthorized Bash Brothers Experience in 2019 alongside Mark McGwire, portrayed by Akiva Schaffer. The comedy special describes the two baseball players' careers and rampant steroid use in the 1980s.

On October 26, 2019, Canseco opened a car wash in Las Vegas, where he signed autographs every Wednesday. He posted on social media in 2023 that he was looking to sell the car wash.

On February 5, 2021, Canseco fought Billy Football from Barstool Sports in a boxing match and was knocked out in the first round.

In August 2024, Canseco was inducted into the Oakland Athletics Hall of Fame.

On July 11, 2026, at age 62, Canseco participated in the Chicago White Sox Alumni Home Run Derby. He hit 3 home runs advancing him to the second round where he hit another 3 home runs but did not advance to the final.

== Legal issues and controversies ==
On February 10, 1989, Canseco was arrested in Florida for reckless driving after allegedly leading an officer on a 15-mile chase. He was found guilty and fined $500.

On April 11, 1989, Canseco was arrested in California for carrying a loaded semi-automatic pistol in his car. He was released on $2,500 bail and pleaded no contest.

On February 13, 1992, Canseco was charged with aggravated battery for ramming his Porsche into a BMW driven by his then-wife Esther Canseco after a verbal altercation. On March 19, 1992, Canseco pleaded not guilty to charges of aggravated assault and later underwent counseling and fulfilled a community-service requirement.

In November 1997, Canseco was arrested for beating his then-wife Jessica Canseco. In January 1998, he pleaded no contest and was sentenced to one year of probation and required to attend counseling.

In October 2001, Canseco and his brother, Ozzie, got into a fight with two men at a Miami Beach nightclub that left one man with a broken nose and another needing 20 stitches in his lip; both were charged with two counts of aggravated battery. The brothers both pleaded guilty and received both probation and community service.

Following his retirement in May 2002, Canseco speculated about having been "blackballed" from Major League Baseball; it was then he announced he was writing a tell-all book about his baseball career and the increasing usage of anabolic steroids in baseball.

In March 2003, Canseco missed a court appearance while in California working out a custody dispute over his 6-year-old child. The judge revoked his probation and sentenced him to two years under house arrest followed by three years' probation.

In June 2003, Canseco was arrested at his home for probation violation after he tested positive for steroids. Canseco spent a month in jail without bail.

In May 2008, Canseco revealed that he had lost his house in Encino, California to foreclosure, saying his two divorces had cost him $7 to $8 million each.

On October 10, 2008, Canseco was detained by immigration officials at a San Diego border crossing as he tried to bring a fertility drug from Mexico. He stated the drug was to help with his hormone replacement therapy, needed due to his use of steroids. On November 4, Canseco pleaded guilty in federal court and was sentenced to 12 months' unsupervised probation by U.S. Magistrate Judge Ruben B. Brooks.

The 2008 A&E Network documentary Jose Canseco: Last Shot chronicles Canseco's attempts to end his steroid use. In it, he also regrets ever writing his tell-all books and naming former teammates as steroid users, as he was never given the opportunity to participate in MLB-affiliated baseball events. Since then, he has tried unsuccessfully to reach out to McGwire and other ex-teammates. In 2014, he returned to the Oakland Coliseum to take part in the reunion celebrating the 25th anniversary of the 1989 World Series championship team; this marked the first time Canseco took part in an official MLB event in almost 13 years. Mark McGwire, at the time coach for the Los Angeles Dodgers, did not attend the event.

On May 22, 2013, Canseco was named as a suspect in a rape allegation in Las Vegas. He broke the news himself on Twitter, denying the allegations by posting pictures and information about his accuser, and accusing her of lying. On June 7, the case against Canseco was closed following an investigation, and he was not charged.

== Mixed martial arts record ==
Professional record breakdown
1 match	0 wins	1 loss
By knockout	0	1

Res.	Record	Opponent	Method	Event	Date	Round	Time	Location	Notes
Loss	0–1	Hong Man Choi	TKO (submission to punches)	Dream 9	May 26, 2009	1	1:17	Yokohama, Japan	DREAM Hulk Grand Prix Quarterfinal

== See also ==
- List of Cuban Americans
- List of Major League Baseball career home run leaders
- List of Major League Baseball career stolen bases leaders
- List of Major League Baseball players from Cuba
- List of Cubans
- List of Major League Baseball individual streaks
- List of doping cases in sport
- List of Major League Baseball players named in the Mitchell Report
