= Texas Thunder (baseball) =

US professional baseball team

- Logo

Information
- Location: McAllen, Texas
- Founded: 2009
- Folded: 2013
- Former name: Texas Thunder (2013); McAllen Thunder (2011–12); Coastal Bend Thunder (2009–10)
- Former leagues: United League Baseball (2013); North American League (2011–12); United League Baseball (2009–10)
- Former ballparks: Edinburg Stadium (2011–12); Fairgrounds Field (2009–10)
- Colors: Navy Blue, Cardinal Red, White
- General manager: Doug Leary

The Texas Thunder were a professional baseball team. The Thunder were a member of the United League Baseball, an independent professional league, which is not affiliated with Major League Baseball or Minor League Baseball.

Former logo, while in Robstown, Texas

The team made its debut as the Coastal Bend Thunder in the United League Baseball in 2009, after the dissolution of the Coastal Bend Aviators of the American Association the previous year. The team played in Fairgrounds Field in Robstown, Texas. The team had financial difficulties and was locked out of their stadium by the city in December 2010 due to unpaid rent, utilities and stadium maintenance costs.

For the following season, the team was adopted by McAllen, Texas and changed its name to the McAllen Thunder. They joined the new North American League and shared Edinburg Stadium with the Edinburg Roadrunners, who were owned by the same people.

In 2013, after the dissolution of the North American League, the team rejoined the ULB, as a true travel team without a home stadium, known as the Texas Thunder. The team was dissolved during the season.
