= History of baseball in Texas =

Like many other states in the United States, Texas has a long history with the game of baseball.

== 19th century: the beginning of baseball in Texas ==
The Houston Base Ball Club was formed in 1861, shortly before the start of the Civil War, though baseball had previously been played in Galveston and other Texas locations. The club's purpose was to promote the game in the same way that Alexander Cartwright had during the 1840s with the Knickerbocker Base Ball Club in Manhattan. The growth of the game was interrupted by the Civil War, during which it was played mostly by Yankees. A humorous story by Texas-based Union soldier George A. Putnam told of a baseball game interrupted by Confederate gunfire. Putnam stated:

Suddenly there was a scattering of fire, which three outfielders caught the brunt; the centerfield was hit and was captured, left and right field managed to get back to our lines. The attack...was repelled without serious difficulty, but we had lost not only our centerfield, but...the only baseball in Alexandria, Texas.

On April 21, 1868, the first occurrence of a baseball game was taken into account by the Houston Post. At the San Jacinto Battlegrounds near Houston, where General Sam Houston led Texas to triumph in the War of Independence from Mexico in 1836, a baseball game took place on the anniversary now celebrated as San Jacinto Day. The Houston "Stonewalls" defeated the Galveston "Robert E. Lees", 35–2, that rivaled the result of what originally happened on the same site.

Baseball spread throughout the state in the next two decades as a popular amateur game. The influence of what the Houston club had done in the early 1860s, along with those who acquired the nuances of the game from Civil War travels and immigrants who moved to Texas during the Reconstruction Era, helped in organizing the sport and bringing more attention to the game in the state. Scarcely a generation after the state's first recorded game in 1868, Texas fielded 100 minor league clubs—more than any other state.

The acceptance of baseball had greatly expanded throughout Texas by the end of the 19th century. Houston Base Ball Club was a founding member of the Texas League in 1888 and also won their first league pennant the next year. The Houston ballclub went by the nicknames of Babies, Red Stockings, Mud Cats, Magnolias, and Wanderers before the Houston Buffaloes name became permanent around the turn of the 20th century.

== Professional baseball ==
=== Minor league ===
The Texas League helped to make professional baseball popular in the state beginning in the late 19th century. There were teams in Austin, Beaumont, Cleburne, Corsicana, Dallas, Fort Worth, Galveston, Greenville, Houston, Paris, San Antonio, Sherman, Temple, Texarkana, and Waco. The Texas League is presently a Major League Baseball (MLB) affiliated minor league at the AA level. Not all the teams in the league are in Texas. However, both of the state's two MLB franchises, the Texas Rangers and the Houston Astros, have teams in Texas in the league. The Rangers' affiliate is the Frisco RoughRiders, while the Astros' affiliate is the Corpus Christi Hooks.

Along with the Texas League, there have been many baseball leagues that briefly existed in Texas or included at least one team from the Lone Star State such as: Lone Star Colored League of Texas, Negro American League, Colored Texas League, Texas Negro League, Texas-Oklahoma Negro League, South Texas Negro League, West Texas Negro League, Mexican National League, Central Baseball League, American Association, All-American Association, South Central League, Arkansas State League, Cotton States League, Rio Grande Valley League, Rio Grande Association, Southwestern League, Panhandle-Pecos Valley League, Longhorn League, North Texas League, West Texas–New Mexico League, Sooner State League, Arizona–Texas League, Lone Star League, Big State League, Gulf States League, East Texas League, Texas Association, Arkansas–Texas League, West Texas League, South Texas League, Middle Texas League, Central Texas League, Texas-Southern League, Texas–Louisiana League, Texas Valley League, Texas–Oklahoma League, Southwest Texas League, Evangeline League, West Dixie League, Gulf Coast League, Western Association, Texas Winter League, United League Baseball, Continental Baseball League, and Sophomore League. In addition to MLB and the Texas League, present-day teams compete in the Pacific Coast League, the Atlantic League of Professional Baseball, the Pecos League, and the American Association of Independent Professional Baseball.

== Amateur baseball ==
=== College baseball ===
College baseball also has been a staple of Texas culture, and Texas collegiate baseball programs can be found throughout the different levels of college athletics. NCAA Division I conferences that currently include Texas teams are the American Athletic Conference, Big 12 Conference, Conference USA, Missouri Valley Conference, Southeastern Conference, Southland Conference, Southwestern Athletic Conference, Sun Belt Conference, and Western Athletic Conference. Many of the major programs (Baylor, Houston, Rice, Southern Methodist (SMU), Texas, Texas A&M, Texas Christian (TCU), and Texas Tech) previously all played together in the Southwest Conference (SWC). SMU ended its baseball program in 1980, and the SWC dissolved in 1996.

Other conferences that include one or more Texas collegiate baseball programs are the Heartland Conference, Lone Star Conference, American Southwest Conference, Southern Collegiate Athletic Conference, Red River Athletic Conference, Sooner Athletic Conference, Southwest Junior College Conference, Texas Intercollegiate Athletic Association, Western Junior College Athletic Conference, and NAIA independent schools (University of Houston–Victoria).

Texas has some intense in-state rivalries such as the Battle of the Brazos between Texas A&M and Baylor University, Houston-Rice rivalry, the Holy War between Baylor and TCU, Battle of the Piney Woods between Sam Houston State and Stephen F. Austin State University, and the Lone Star Showdown between the Texas Longhorns and Texas A&M Aggies. Other in-state rivalries include Sam Houston State–Rice, Texas–Rice, Texas State–Rice, Texas State–University of Texas at San Antonio, Texas Tech–Baylor, Texas–Texas Tech, Texas Tech–Texas A&M, Texas–Baylor, Sam Houston State–Houston, Texas Southern–Prairie View A&M, St. Mary's–University of the Incarnate Word, Dallas Baptist–Houston Baptist as well as other esoteric rivalries.

Tournaments, like the Southwest Diamond Classic in Frisco, Texas, Whataburger College Classic in Corpus Christi, Texas, and Houston College Classic played at Daikin Park, take place in late February because of the more convenient, warmer weather.
