= Brownsville Toros =

Information
- League: Texas Winter League (2006–present)
- Location: Brownsville, Texas
- Ballpark: Harlingen Field
- Founded: 2006
- League championships: 1 (2007)
- Division championships: 1 (2007)
- Colors: red, black
- Ownership: United Sports Equities
- Manager: Ricky VanAsselberg
- Media: The Brownsville Herald

The Brownsville Toros are a professional baseball team based in Brownsville, Texas, in the United States. The Toros are a member of the Texas Winter League, which is not affiliated with Major League Baseball. From the 2006 season to the present, the Toros have played their games at Harlingen Field, which hosts all Texas Winter League teams.

== Team Record ==
Season	W	L	Win %	Result
2007	17	3	.850	Champions
