= Rio Grande Valley WhiteWings =

Baseball team in Texas, US

- Logo

Information
- League: United League Baseball (2013–2014)
- Location: Harlingen, Texas
- Ballpark: Harlingen Field
- Founded: 1994
- Disbanded: 2014
- League championships: 2 (2000, 2014)
- Division championships: 1 (2007)
- Former name: Rio Grande Valley WhiteWings (1994–2003, 2006–07, 2009–2014); Harlingen WhiteWings (2008–2009)
- Former leagues: North American League (2011–12); United League Baseball (2006–10); Central Baseball League (2002–03); Texas–Louisiana League (1994–2001)
- Colors: Black, white, grey
- Ownership: Reunion Sports Group
- General manager: Doug Robinson
- Manager: Chris Paterson
- Media: Valley Morning Star
- Website: http://www.whitewingsbaseball.org/

The Rio Grande Valley WhiteWings was a professional baseball team based in Harlingen, Texas, in the United States. The WhiteWings was a member of United League Baseball, an independent professional league which is not affiliated with Major League Baseball or Minor League Baseball. From the 1994 season to 2014, the WhiteWings played its home games at Harlingen Field.

== History ==
Baseball in the region of the Rio Grande Valley had been played before in the Gulf States League (Class A ball), which lasted one season (1976) with six teams, one of which played in Harlingen, Texas by the name of the Rio Grande Valley WhiteWings. Eighteen years later, the Texas–Louisiana League was formed, done on the frustrations of Dallas businessman Byron Pierce and U.S. Congressman John Bryant of the Texas League not having plans for expansion. The Rio Grande Valley would receive a team as a charter member, which was called the WhiteWings and play at Harlingen Field, which had dimensions of 310' for the corners and 380' in center field for a crowd of 4,000. The WhiteWings won the Texas–Louisiana League Championship in 2000, upsetting the San Angelo Colts and Amarillo Dillas to win the pennant under manager Eddie Dennis (two years later, the league rebranded as the Central Baseball League). After falling on hard times, the WhiteWings suspended operations in 2003. In late 2005, United League Baseball announced that the WhiteWings would resume play as the first charter member of the new league in 2006. They played the 2006 and 2007 seasons before deciding to rebrand in 2008. That year, they rebranded as the Harlingen WhiteWings. After three seasons, they changed the name back to the Rio Grande Valley WhiteWings, announcing it as such in May 2009.

In 2011 and 2012, the WhiteWings played in the North American League, where they made the playoffs twice. They returned to the ULB in 2013 and played two season, winning the championship in 2014, their final season. The team announced in 2015 that it was shutting down and would not a field a team for the upcoming season.

== Season-by-season record ==
Season
Season	League	Manager	Wins	Losses	Pct.	Result
Rio Grande Valley WhiteWings
1976	Gulf States League	Ted Uhlaender	32	40	.444	
1994	Texas-Louisiana League	Alan Ashby	40	48	.455	
1995	Texas-Louisiana League	Alan Ashby	53	46	.535	
1996	Texas-Louisiana League	John Pacella	50	48	.510	Lost in 1st Round
1997	Texas-Louisiana League	Mike Brumley	39	53	.424	
1998	Texas-Louisiana League	Eddie Dennis	36	48	.429	
1999	Texas-Louisiana League	Eddie Dennis	45	38	.542	
2000	Texas-Louisiana League	Eddie Dennis	63	49	.563	Won Championship (Amarillo) 3–1
2001	Texas-Louisiana League	George Scott	40	56	.417	
2002	Central Baseball League	John Harris	37	59	.385	
2003	Central Baseball League	John Harris	44	52	.458	
2006	United League Baseball	Eddie Dennis	38	52	.422	
2007	United League Baseball	Eddie Dennis	50	45	.526	Lost Finals (Alexandria) 4–0
Harlingen WhiteWings
2008	United League Baseball	Al Gallagher	20	62	.244	
2009	United League Baseball	Eddie Dennis	39	41	.488	
2010	United League Baseball	Eddie Dennis	47	45	.511	Lost Semifinals (Amarillo) 2–0
Rio Grande Valley WhiteWings
2011	North American League	Eddie Dennis	51	37	.580	Won Semifinals (San Angelo) 4–0; Lost Finals (Edmonton) 4–1
2012	North American League	Eddie Dennis	51	44	.537	Lost Semifinals (Edinburg) 2–0
2013	United League Baseball	Chris Paterson	32	43	.427	
2014	United League Baseball	Chris Paterson	50	27	.649	Won Finals (Fort Worth) 3–0

== All-Stars ==
=== Players ===
1994

- John O'Brien, 1B

1995

- Tim Garland, LF
- John O'Brien, 1b
- Clint Davis, RP
- Kyle Duke, SP
- Jamie Cooley, C

1996

- Lipso Nava, SS
- John O'Brien, 1B

1997

- Pat Koerner (Rookie of the Year)
- Bryan Warner, OF (Most Valuable Player)
- Ryan Whitaker, RHP

1998

- Scott Emerson, Major League Baseball pitching coach Oakland Athletics
- Jay Davis, OF
- Jason Fawcett, RHP
- Omar Ramirez, LF
- Joe Stutz, RHP
- Mark Swindell, 2b

1999

- Sergio Cairo, OF
- Eddie Fitzpatrick, C
- Mario Rodriguez, RHP
- Michael Decelle, OF

2000

- Yfrain Linares, RHP (Pitcher of the Year)
- Manny Lopez, OF
- Hector Roa, 2B

2001

- Carlos Duncan, OF
- Tyrone Pendergrass, OF
- Ty Ryburn, P

2002

- John Ballon, 3B

2003
N/A

2006

- Adam Clay, RHP

2007

- Jermy Acey, 2B
- Derek Bennett, RHP
- Omar Bramasco, Utah
- David Cardona, OF
- Ryan Fox, DH
- Kevin Griffin, C
- Joe Rogers, LHP

2008

- Kevin Griffin, C
- Jorge Lugo, LHP

== Past managers ==
- Alan Ashby (1994–1995)
- John Pacella (1996)
- Mike Brumley (1997)
- George Scott (2001)
- "Dirty" Al Gallagher (2008)
- Eduardo "Eddie" Dennis (1998–2000, 2006–07, 2009 – 2010)
