= Brownsville Charros (ULB) =

- Logo

Information
- League: United League Baseball
- Location: Brownsville, Texas
- Founded: 2014
- Disbanded: 2014
- Former ballpark: Harlingen Field
- Colors: Green, Red, Orange
- Ownership: United League Baseball
- Manager: Ozzie Canseco
- Website: www.brownsvillecharros.net

The Brownsville Charros were a minor league baseball team that played in the United League Baseball, which is an independent league not affiliated with Minor League Baseball.

The Charros were formed by the league in 2014 to replace the departing Edinburg Roadrunners. They are primarily a travel team that plays most of its games on the road, but they do play some home games at Harlingen Field. The team was originally to be called the Mexico Paisanos, before a deal was worked out to name them after the original Brownsville Charros. The league folded at the conclusion of the season.
