= Aviators Ballpark =

Aviators Ballpark may refer to the following arenas in Seattle:

- Las Vegas Ballpark
- Fairgrounds Field
