= Edinburg Stadium (disambiguation) =

Edinburg Stadium is a baseball stadium in Edinburg, Texas.

Edinburg Stadium or Edinburgh Stadium may also refer to

- Bert Ogden Arena, an arena in Edinburg, Texas.
- Robert and Janet Vackar Stadium, a football stadium in Edinburg, Texas.
- UTRGV Soccer and Track & Field Complex, a soccer stadium in Edinburg, Texas.
