= Foster Field =

Baseball stadium in San Angelo, Texas, US

Coordinates: 31.4359°N 100.4540°W

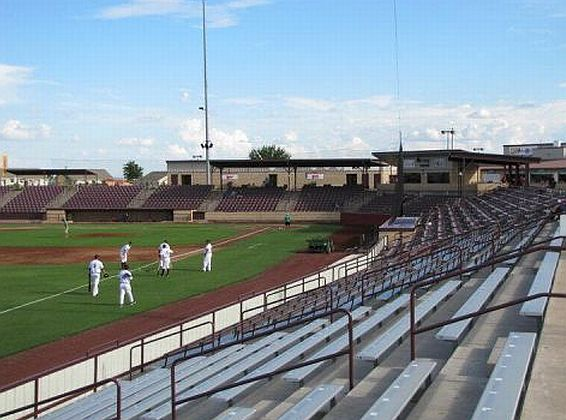
- Interactive map of Foster Field
- Former names: Colts Stadium
- Location: San Angelo, Texas
- Owner: Angelo State University
- Operator: Angelo State University
- Capacity: 4,200
- Surface: Artificial Turf
- Field size: Left field - 325 ft Center field - 390 ft Right field - 325 ft

Construction
- Groundbreaking: 1999
- Opened: 2000
- Cost: $3 million
- Architect: Anglea Sports Fields

Tenants
- San Angelo Colts (TLL/CBL/NAL/ULB) (2000–2014); Angelo State Rams (NCAA) (2000–present)

Foster Field at 1st Community Credit Union Stadium, Norris Diamond is a baseball stadium at Angelo State University in San Angelo, Texas.

The stadium is home to the Angelo State University Rams Baseball team.

It was built in 2000 for the San Angelo Colts and the Angelo State University Rams. The Colts played in United League Baseball and were then the primary tenants. The stadium is located on the campus of Angelo State University. The stadium can seat 4,200 fans.

Foster Field, originally named Colts Stadium, cost $3 million to construct and was built by Jim Anglea, the former head groundskeeper for the Ballpark at Arlington. It was named after Walton A. Foster, a radio and television pioneer who also served as the radio broadcaster for the original Colts franchise in the 1950s.

The field features 4,200 permanent seats, a Triple A lighting system and a Spectrum inning-by-inning scoreboard with video display. In addition, the facility has a large press box area, major-league style dugouts and a complete training and locker room facility.

The field also has artificial turf, state-of-the-art bullpens and batting cages for practice and warm-up. Concession and restroom areas as well as special clubhouse style seating areas for entertaining corporate sponsors are located on either side of the press box.

The field dimensions are 325 feet (99 m) down the lines, 370 feet (110 m) to the gaps and 395 feet (120 m) to deep center field.

Events and tenants
Preceded by (GBL) Nettleton Stadium (ULB) Potter County Memorial Stadium	Host of the GBL/ULB All-Star Game; Foster Field; 2008	Succeeded by (GBL) Bruce Hurst Field (ULB) not played
