= Ozzie Canseco =

Cuban baseball player (born 1964)

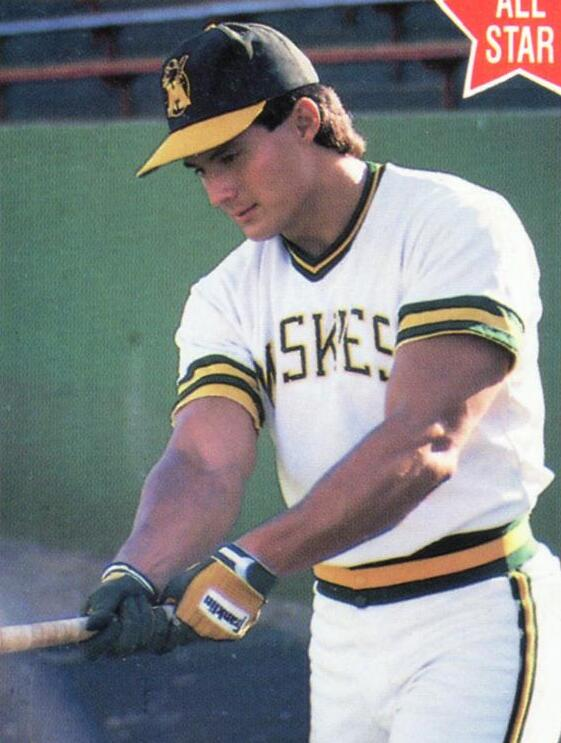
- Canseco with the Madison Muskies c. 1988
- Outfielder
- Born: July 2, 1964 (age 62); Havana, Cuba
- Batted: Right Threw: Right

MLB debut
- July 18, 1990, for the Oakland Athletics

Last MLB appearance
- May 13, 1993, for the St. Louis Cardinals

MLB statistics
- Batting average: .200
- Hits: 13
- Runs batted in: 4
- Stats at Baseball Reference

Teams
- Oakland Athletics (1990); St. Louis Cardinals (1992–1993)

Osvaldo "Ozzie" Canseco Capas (born July 2, 1964) is a Cuban-American former professional baseball player. He is the identical twin brother of former Major League Baseball player José Canseco.

He was manager for the Brownsville Charros of the United League before the league's dissolution. He was previously the pitching and hitting coach for the Yuma Scorpions of the independent North American League and the manager of the Edinburg Roadrunners.

== Playing career ==
Ozzie had a brief major league career, playing in 24 career games with the Oakland Athletics and St. Louis Cardinals between 1990 and 1993. In 1991, he played in Japan for the Kintetsu Buffaloes.

Canseco was drafted as a pitcher by the New York Yankees in the second round of the 1983 Major League Baseball draft. In stark contrast to the prolific, power hitting career of his twin brother, Ozzie never hit a major league home run.

Canseco currently holds the Atlantic League single season home run record with 48, which he achieved while playing for the Newark Bears in 2000. After the season ended Canseco was named the league's MVP. Ozzie's total of 48 home runs is ironically also the Canseco family single season home run record. Ozzie's brother Jose hit 462 Major League home runs, and 98 more at other levels of professional baseball, but he never hit more than 46 in a single season.

Later Ozzie played one season in the Northern League. In 1991, he signed a one-year contract with the Kintetsu Buffaloes of the Japanese Pacific League. However, due to an injury, Ozzie would never play a game with the Buffaloes.

== Yuma Scorpions ==
On April 11, 2011, it was announced that Ozzie and his brother would play for the Yuma Scorpions of the North American League. In addition to playing, Ozzie would be the bench coach and Jose would manage the team. Ozzie played 12 games with 8 hits and 12 RBIs. His season batting average was .258.

== Other activities ==
Canseco appeared on an episode of VH1's The Surreal Life (Season 5) as a José Canseco impersonator. At the end of the program, it was revealed that he was José's twin brother. He has also reportedly appeared at baseball card shows and book signings passing himself off as his brother.

As manager of the Brownsville Charros in the United League, Ozzie pulled his team off the field with a 2–1 lead giving the RGV Whitewings a win.

== Legal troubles ==
In 2002, Canseco pleaded guilty to charges stemming from a nightclub fight on October 31, 2001. He and his brother Jose got into a fight with two California tourists at a Miami Beach nightclub that left one man with a broken nose and another needing 20 stitches in his lip; Canseco was charged with two counts of aggravated battery. The brothers received probation and community service. Ozzie was sentenced to 18 months' probation, 200 hours of community service, and anger management classes.

In 2003, Canseco was sentenced to four months in jail for possessing an illegal anabolic steroid and driving with a suspended license.
