= Aviators Stadium =

Aviators Stadium is the former or alternative name of:

- Fairgrounds Field, Robstown, Texas, US
- Las Vegas Ballpark, Summerlin South, Nevada, US
- Rivets Stadium, Loves Park, Illinois, US
