= Aviators Field =

Aviators Field may refer to the following arenas in Seattle:

- Las Vegas Ballpark
- Fairgrounds Field
