= Veterans Field (Texas) =

Baseball venue in Laredo, Texas, United States

- Interactive map of Veterans Field
- Former names: West Martin Field
- Location: Laredo, Texas
- Coordinates: 27.5197°N 99.5093°W
- Owner: City of Laredo
- Capacity: Baseball: 5,000

Construction
- Built: 1950
- Opened: 1950
- Renovated: 2002, 2020

Tenants
- TAMIU Dustdevils; Tecolotes de los Dos Laredos (LMB) (1985–2003); Laredo Apaches (CBL) (1995); Laredo Broncos (ULB) (2006–2010)

Veterans Field is a baseball venue in Laredo, Texas. Built in 1950, the park was formerly known as West Martin Field, but the field's name was changed to honor the men and women who have served defending America in the armed forces. Home to many teams over the years, it was renovated in 2002, and now seats 5,000 with concessions and two picnic areas. Veterans Field was home to the Laredo Broncos of United League Baseball. Veterans Field was also the home to the five-time champion of the Mexican League team Tecolotes de los Dos Laredos from 1985 to 2003. Veterans Field is also home to the Texas A&M International University Dustdevils college baseball team of the NCAA's Division II Heartland Conference.
