= Aviators Park =

Aviators Park may refer to the following arenas in Seattle:

- Las Vegas Ballpark
- Fairgrounds Field
