= Texas Winter League =

Instructional baseball league

- Sport: Baseball
- Founded: 2012
- No. of teams: 6
- Country: USA
- Most recent champion: Prairie Dogs

The Texas Winter League was an annual instructional showcase baseball league held in San Antonio, Texas. Participants include players coming back from injury, players who were released at the end of the season, or players looking to sign their first professional contract.

In 2014, the league's final season, 62 players were signed to professional contracts with teams from leagues including the United League, the American Association, and Frontier League

In 2013, 47 players were signed to professional contracts with teams from leagues including the United League, the American Association, the Frontier League, and the Atlantic League.

Managers who have participated in the Texas Winter and Summer Leagues include Jorge Alvarez, Jose Canseco, Ozzie Canseco, Brooks Carey, Chris Carminucci, Eddie Dennis, Dan Firova, Orv Franchuk, John Harris, Von Hayes, Pete LaCock, Les Lancaster, Mike Marshall, Rusty Meacham, Scott "Nate" Nathanson, Chris Paterson, and Greg Tagert
