= Edinburg Roadrunners =

Logo
Cap insignia

Information
- League: United League Baseball (2013)
- Location: Edinburg, Texas
- Ballpark: Edinburg Stadium
- Founded: 2001
- Disbanded: 2013
- League championships: 2001; 2004; 2012; 2013
- Former name: Edinburg Roadrunners (2009–13); Edinburg Coyotes (2006–08); Edinburg Roadrunners (2001–05)
- Former leagues: North American League (2011–12); United League Baseball (2006–10); Central Baseball League (2002–05); Texas–Louisiana League (2001)
- Colors: Red, blue, white, black, yellow
- Ownership: Reunion Sports Group
- Media: McAllen Monitor
- Website: www.roadrunnerball.com

The Edinburg Roadrunners were a professional baseball team based in Edinburg, Texas, in the United States. The Roadrunners were a member of the United League Baseball, an independent professional league which is not affiliated with Major League Baseball or Minor League Baseball. They played in United League Baseball from 2006 to 2010 and the North American League from 2011 to 2012. They played their home games at Edinburg Stadium. The city refused to extend a lease for the 2014 season and with nowhere to play the team shut down.

== History ==
The Edinburg Roadrunners started play in the Texas–Louisiana League in 2001, an independent baseball league not affiliated with Major League Baseball or Minor League Baseball. All games were played at Edinburg Stadium. They won the league title that year, which was the last before a rebranding led to the league being known as the Central Baseball League. They won the 2004 title in a sweep. The league disbanded in 2005, with half of the teams (Fort Worth Cats, Shreveport-Bossier Sports, Pensacola Pelicans, Coastal Bend Aviators, and El Paso Diablos) electing to join the American Association of Professional Baseball while the other half (Alexandria Aces, Amarillo Dillas, Laredo Broncos, Rio Grande Valley WhiteWings and San Angelo Colts) joined to make United League Baseball. However, the Roadrunners had folded prior to the league closing. In its place would be a new team in Edinburg christened the Edinburg Coyotes.The Coyotes began their existence by winning a historic 17 games without a loss, a minor league record, completing over 5 series before finally losing to the San Angelo Colts. The Coyotes went on to win the inaugural United League regular season title before losing to the Alexandria Aces in the league championship. After spending its first three seasons as the Coyotes, United League Baseball at a press conference on April 30, 2009 announced the franchise would become the Edinburg Roadrunners, named after the prior popular ball club, including its team logo and mascot.

The Roadrunners played 2009 and 2010 in the ULB before moving on to the North American League in 2011, where they played two seasons. They played one final season in 2013 with the United League. In their final season (consisting of a six-team league that saw two teams fold), they won the championship.

== Season-by-season record ==
Season
Season	League	Manager	Wins	Losses	Pct.	Result
Edinburg Roadrunners
2001	Texas–Louisiana League	Chad Tredaway	64	32	.667	Won Championship (San Angelo Colts) 3–1
2002	Central Baseball League	Chad Tredaway	64	42	.604	League runner-up
2003	Central Baseball League	Chad Tredaway	58	38	.604	
2004	Central Baseball League	Chad Tredaway	68	27	.716	Won Championship (Shreveport) 3–0
2005	Central Baseball League	Vince Moore	49	45	.521	
Edinburg Coyotes
2006	United League Baseball	Vince Moore	57	33	.633	Won Semifinals (Laredo) 2–1; Lost Finals (Alexandria) 3–1
2007 (Note: In 2007, the League instituted a split-season schedule, and the record listed here is a combination of Edinburg's record in the first half (25-25) and second half 18-27)	United League Baseball	Vince Moore	43	52	.453	
2008	United League Baseball	Vince Moore	41	44	.482	Lost Semifinals (Amarillo) 2–0
Edinburg Roadrunners
2009	United League Baseball	Vince Moore	46	34	.575	Lost Semifinals (Amarillo) 2–1
2010	United League Baseball	Vince Moore	50	39	.562	Won Semifinals (Laredo) 2–1; Lost Finals (Amarillo) 3–1
2011	North American League	Steve Maddock	37	52	.416	
2012	North American League	Vince Moore	60	36	.625	Won Semifinals (Rio Grande Valley) 2–0; Won Finals (Fort Worth) 3–0
2013	United League Baseball	Ozzie Canseco	40	39	.506	Won Finals (Fort Worth) 3–2

== All-Stars ==
=== Players ===
2006

- Evan Cherry, OF
- Robinson Cancel, C
- Neomar Flores, RHP
- Eric Montoya, RHP
- Jose Olmeda, 1B
- Edwar Ramírez, RHP
- Larry Martin Jr., LHP
- Julio Ruiz, RHP

2007

- Julio Castro, RHP
- Luis Espinosa, C
- Eric Gonzalez, 2B
- Aaron Guerra, RHP
- Rodney Medina, OF
- Bric Steed, LHP
- Nelson Teilon, SS

2008

- Julio Castro, RHP
- Jarvis Abram, OF

== Major League players ==
- Edwar Ramírez, RHP – New York Yankees, Oakland Athletics
- Robinson Cancel, C – Milwaukee Brewers, New York Mets, Houston Astros

=== Managers ===
- Chad Tredaway (2001–04)
- Vince Moore (2004–05)
- Steve Maddock (2011)

=== All-Stars ===
2001

- Scott Fowler, RHP (Rookie of the Year)
- Sergio Guerrero, 2B
- Ryan Harris, RHP
- Chad Tredaway, Manager (Manager of the Year)

2002

- Pedro Cervantes, RP
- Scott Green, RHP
- Steve Shirley, 3B (Rookie of the Year)
- Chad Tredaway, Manager (Manager of the Year)

2003

- Ryan Harris, RHP

2004

- Anthony Angel, 2B
- Pedro Flores, LHP
- Ryan Harris, RHP
- Ryan Lehr, IF
- Eric Montoya, RHP
- Ryan Webb, OF

2005

- Matt Spencer, OF
- Steve Wilkerson, P

=== Major League players ===
- Randy Williams – LHP with Seattle Mariners (2004), San Diego Padres (2005), Colorado Rockies (2005)

=== Connections with current Edinburg Roadrunners ===
Connections between the original and current Edinburg Roadrunners include the same name, logo, colors, mascot Rowdy the Roadrunner, manager Vince Moore, CBL/ULB All-Star Eric Gonzalez, Pitcher Pedro Flores, and playing at Edinburg Baseball Stadium. The Rio Grande Valley WhiteWings have been a rival of both teams.
