= Pueblo Bighorns =

- 1995; Pueblo, Colorado

Minor league affiliations
- League: Texas-Louisiana League

Team data
- Name: Pueblo Bighorns
- Ballpark: Rawlings Field

The Pueblo Bighorns were a minor league baseball team which played in Pueblo, Colorado. They were a member of the Texas–Louisiana League, an expansion team owned and organized by the league's investors, and brought professional baseball back to Pueblo. They played the first half of their inaugural season, until financial difficulty, lack of corporate sponsorship and resulting poor fan attendance (due to the franchise's hasty organization) forced the Bighorns to disband. Like all TLL clubs, they were unaffiliated with Major League Baseball. The team played at Rawlings Field on the campus of Colorado State University Pueblo.

== Team Record ==
Season	W	L	Win %	Result
1995	21	29	.420	4th Place, North Division (1st Half)

== Players ==
- Brian M. Ahern, RHP
- Robby Alexander, RHP
- Bobby Applegate, RHP
- Sam Arminio, RHP
- James P. Boynewicz, RHP
- Ramon A. Cedeño
- Raymond C. Cervantes
- Sean L. Collins
- Rob Darnell
- David C. Dawson, RHP
- Robert L. Dickerson
- David Escoto
- Benjamin P. Fleetham, RHP
- Fabio M. Gomez
- Eduardo Gonzalez
- Andre G. Johnson
- Jack E. Johnson
- Benji Kaber
- Robin Lindsey
- Dan E. Madsen
- Robert Magallanes
- Kelly J. Mann
- Sean Martinez, RHP
- David May, LHP
- Eric P. Mediavilla
- Daryl J. Moore, RHP
- Robert D. Moore, RHP
- Brian P. Nelson, RHP
- Jamie Nelson
- Jorge Perez
- Jose A. Perozo
- Eric Rice, LHP
- Sammie Ridley, RHP
- Glenn M. Sullivan
- Shawn Tipton, RHP
- Wayne L. Wilkerson
- Kip E. Yaughn, RHP
