= Lon Goldstein Field =

Baseball park in Fort Worth, Texas, US

Coordinates: 32.669°N 97.289°W

Lon Goldstein Field is an approximately 2,000 seat baseball park located in Fort Worth, Texas.

The ballpark was opened in 1975, as part of the athletic field for the Fort Worth Independent School District.

The ballpark is bounded by Joe B. Rushing Road (north, left field), beyond which is Rolling Hills Park; C.A. Roberson Boulevard (west, third base), across which is Tarrant County College South Campus; athletic facilities and the football stadium, and then Interstate Highway 20 (south, first base); and soccer fields and Wichita Street (east, right field).

As of 2026, Lon Goldstein Field hosts home games for the Arlington Baptist University baseball team.

The ballpark also hosted the Fort Worth Cats in 2001 while the new club awaited the reconstruction of LaGrave Field.
