= UTRGV Baseball Stadium =

Baseball stadium in Edinburg, Texas, US

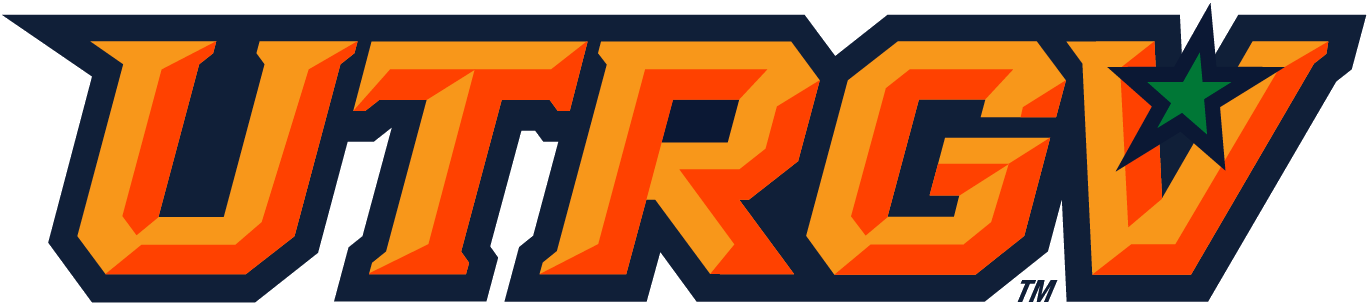

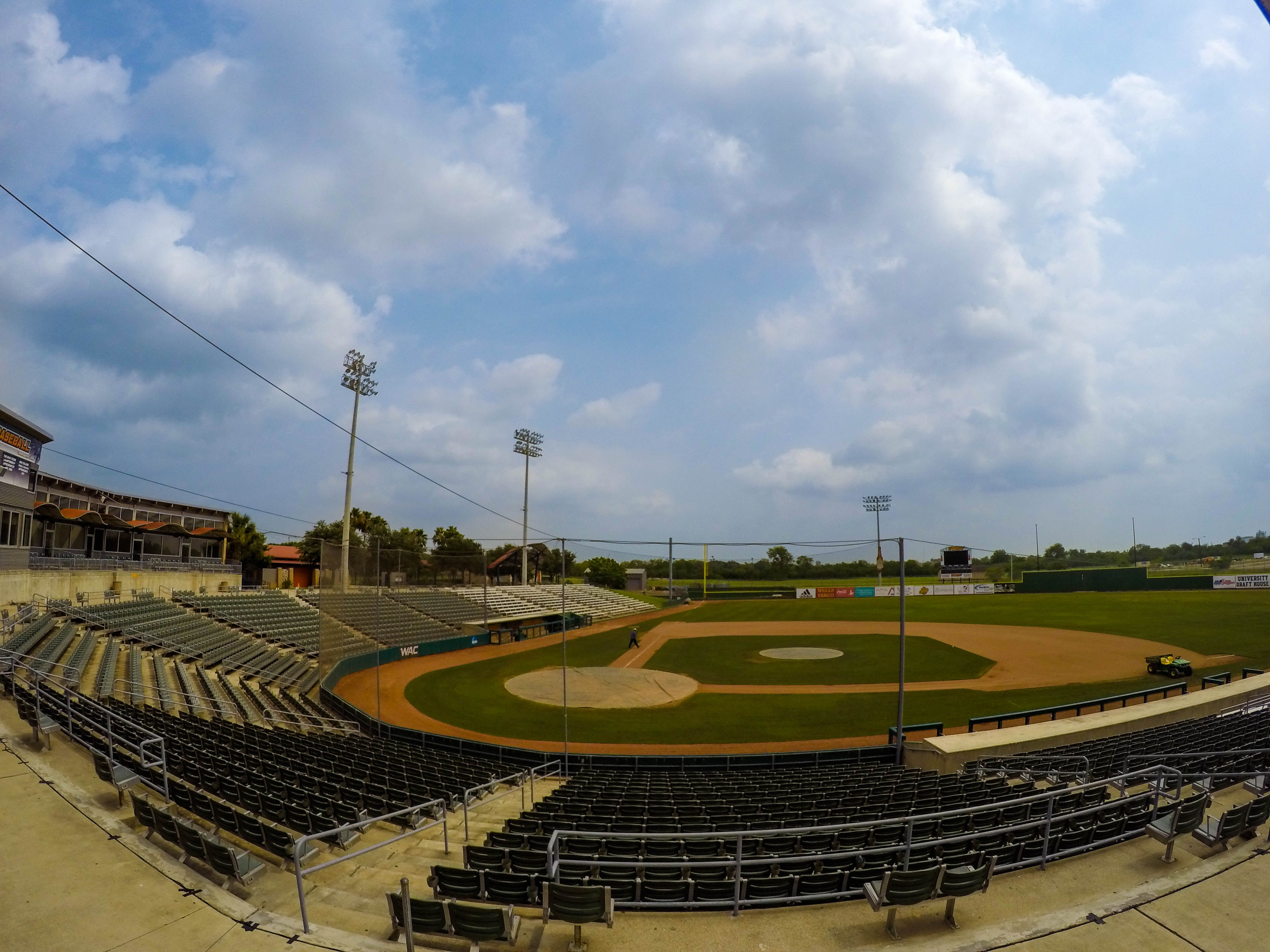
- UTRGV Baseball Stadium
- Interactive map of UTRGV Baseball Stadium
- Former names: Edinburg Stadium
- Location: 920 North Sugar Road; Edinburg, Texas
- Coordinates: 26°18′44″N 98°10′33″W
- Owner: University of Texas Rio Grande Valley
- Operator: University of Texas Rio Grande Valley
- Capacity: 4,000 Record Capacity: 6,418 UTRGV vs. Texas on April 26, 2022
- Executive suites: 10 (20 seats each)
- Surface: Natural grass
- Field size: Left field – 335 ft Center field – 410 ft Right field – 335 ft

Construction
- Groundbreaking: 2000
- Opened: 2001
- Cost: $5.3 million
- Architects: Cotera, Kolar, Negrete & Reed

Tenants
- Edinburg Roadrunners (2001–2013); Texas–Pan American Broncs/UTRGV Vaqueros (NCAA) (2001–Present)

Website
- goutrgv.com/basebstadium

UTRGV Baseball Stadium, originally Edinburg Stadium, is a stadium in Edinburg, Texas, United States. It is primarily used for baseball and is the home of the UTRGV Vaqueros of college baseball. It was also the home to the Edinburg Roadrunners of the Texas–Louisiana League/Central Baseball League/United League Baseball. The Roadrunners disbanded before the 2014 season. The stadium, which opened in 2001, holds 4,000 people, expandable to 14,000-16,000 for concerts and other special events. It includes a 17.8' x 13.6' diamondvision scoreboard and luxury boxes.

In 2015, the stadium received major upgrades due to the school officially becoming the owner. New rails and padding for the dugouts were added. The "double wall" fence was cut down to make the park more hitter-friendly. Currently, the stadium is getting repainted, locker rooms receiving new graphics and carpet, and a brand-new scoreboard donated by Coca-Cola will be placed just before the home opener.

The stadium, formerly owned by the City of Edinburg in years prior to 2014, was donated to the University of Texas System. The University of Texas Rio Grande Valley operates the stadium. It was renamed in 2016.

== See also ==
- List of NCAA Division I baseball venues

Events and tenants
Preceded by first venue	Host of the ULB All-Star Game; Edinburg Stadium; 2006	Succeeded by Potter County Memorial Stadium
