= Laredo Broncos =

- Logo

Information
- League: United League Baseball (2006–10)
- Location: Laredo, Texas
- Ballpark: Veterans Field
- Founded: 2006
- Disbanded: 2010
- Former name: Laredo Broncos (2006–10)
- Colors: Red, gold, black
- General manager: José Meléndez
- Manager: Dan Firova
- Media: Laredo Morning Times
- Website: www.laredobroncos.net

The Laredo Broncos were a professional baseball team based in Laredo, Texas, in the United States. The Broncos were a member of United League Baseball, an independent professional league which was not affiliated with Major League Baseball or Minor League Baseball. From the 2006 season to 2010, the Broncos played their home games at Veterans Field.

== History ==
In their first season, after a disappointing 5-15 start, the Broncos earned respect by having a winning record down the stretch and winning 11 of their last 16 games, making a trip to the playoffs where they pushed the first place Edinburg Coyotes to their limit before being eliminated. In 2010, the Laredo Broncos folded because ULB ceased to exist and the fact that the city of Laredo preferred to lease the future Laredo Ballpark to a then new expansion franchise team Laredo Lemurs in the American Association than the Broncos since ULB had filed for Chapter 11 bankruptcy.

== Mascot ==
Buster the Bronco was the mascot of the Laredo Broncos for all 5 seasons. The mascot's name and image were selected by the executive staff before the 2006 season started.

== Front office ==
- General Manager - Jose Melendez
- Director of Sales - Albert Herrera
- Director of Operations - B.D. "Bill" Hancock

== Team record ==
Season	W	L	Win %	Result
2006	44	46	.489	Wild Card
Winter 2007	8	12	.400	
2007	41	54	.432	
2008	39	48	.448	

== Executive staff ==
- General Manager - Jose Melendez 2006 - 2010
- Director of Sales - Albert Herrera 2006 - 2008
- Director of Operations - Bill Hancock 2006 - 2008
- Director of Media & Marketing - Ray Melendez 2006, 2010

== All-Stars ==
=== Players ===
2006

- Edwin Maldonado, 2B (Most Valuable Player)
- Darryl Roque, RHP
- Jose Salas, C/1B
- Arnoldo Ponce, SS
- Orlando Cruz, CF

2007

- Luis Arroyo, LHP
- Orlando Cruz, OF
- Santo Hernandez, RHP
- Hector Lebron, 1B
- Juan Lebron, OF
- Henry Lozado, RHP
- Edwin Maldonado, 3B

2008

- Santo Hernandez, RHP
- Gregorio Martinez, RHP
- Luany Sanchez, C
- Dwayne White, OF
- John Odom, RHP
- Matt Bauman, LHP

2010

- Jose Canseco, DH
- Santo Hernandez, RHP
- Juan Peralta, RHP
- Salvador Paniagua, C
- Kenny Gilbert, OF
- Jason Diaz, OF

=== Coaches ===
2006

- Dalphi Correa, 3B Coach
- Larry Van Allen, Hitting Coach

2010

- Jose Canseco, Bench Coach
- Alex Ortiz, Hitting Coach

== Past Managers ==
- Michael Smith (2006)
- Dan Shwam (2006)
- Dan Shwam (2007)
- Angel "Papo" Davila (2008)
- Ricardo Cuevas (2009)
- Dan Firova (2010)
