= Bringhurst Field =

Baseball stadium in Alexandria, Louisiana

Coordinates: 31.286615°N 92.458556°W

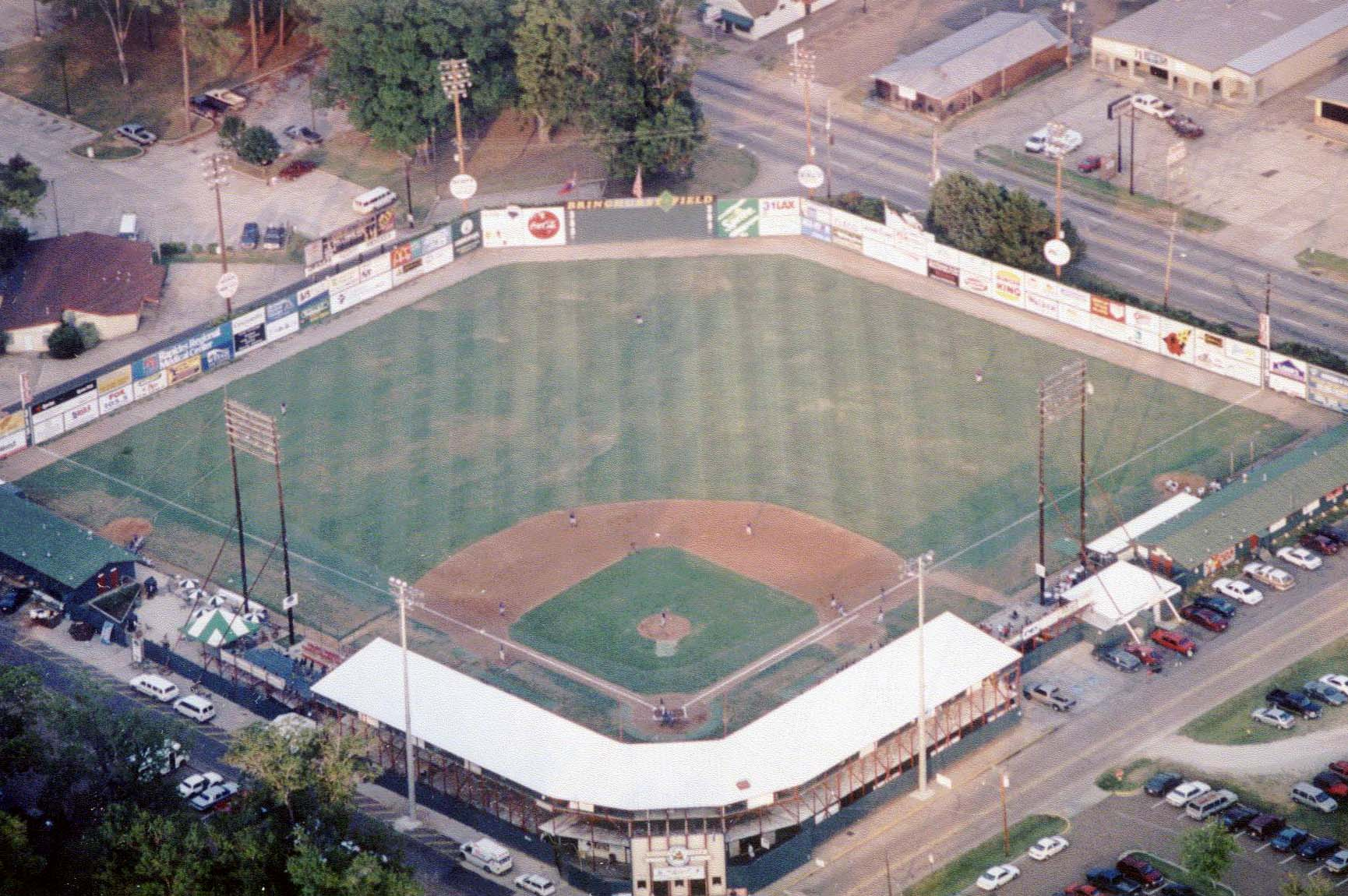
- Interactive map of Bringhurst Field
- Location: Alexandria, Louisiana
- Owner: City of Alexandria
- Operator: City of Alexandria
- Capacity: 3,500
- Surface: Natural grass
- Field size: Left field - 315 ft Center field - 385 ft Right field - 315 ft

Construction
- Groundbreaking: 1934
- Opened: 1934

Tenant
- Alexandria Aces (1933-1942, 1946-1957, 1972-1975, 1994-2003, 2006-2013)

Bringhurst Field is a baseball stadium in Alexandria, Louisiana. Originally constructed in 1934, Bringhurst is the oldest public ballpark in Louisiana. Owned by the city of Alexandria, it served as the home field of the Alexandria Aces, one of the state's most successful minor league professional baseball teams. The Aces played 40 seasons between 1934 and 2013, winning a total of seven championships (1936, 1940, 1997, 1998 2006, 2007, and 2009) and finishing with an all-time regular season record of 2,424 wins and 2,135 losses. Bringhurst has also hosted local high school games. Built in 1934 and extensively renovated several times, its most recent seating configuration had a capacity of 3,500 people. It was the home field for a local high school, the Bolton High School Bears.

For many years the ballpark hosted the Louisiana High School Baseball Championships and the Louisiana High School All-Star Game. Alexandria Zoological Park is situated behind the left field wall.

Amenities included a two-room press box, two picnic areas, two separate clubhouses for home and visiting teams, deck seating for sponsors, and electric fans to cool the rooters sitting in the wooden seating areas, which are not individual seats but rather a long wooden stairway extending behind the boxes.

The field was named in honor of seven-term Alexandria Commissioner of Streets and Parks, Robert Wilton Bringhurst (1877-1949), who quietly leased the site of the future ballpark from a private landowner in 1933, following the destruction of the grandstands at the city's existing ballpark, City Park Diamond.

== Gallery ==
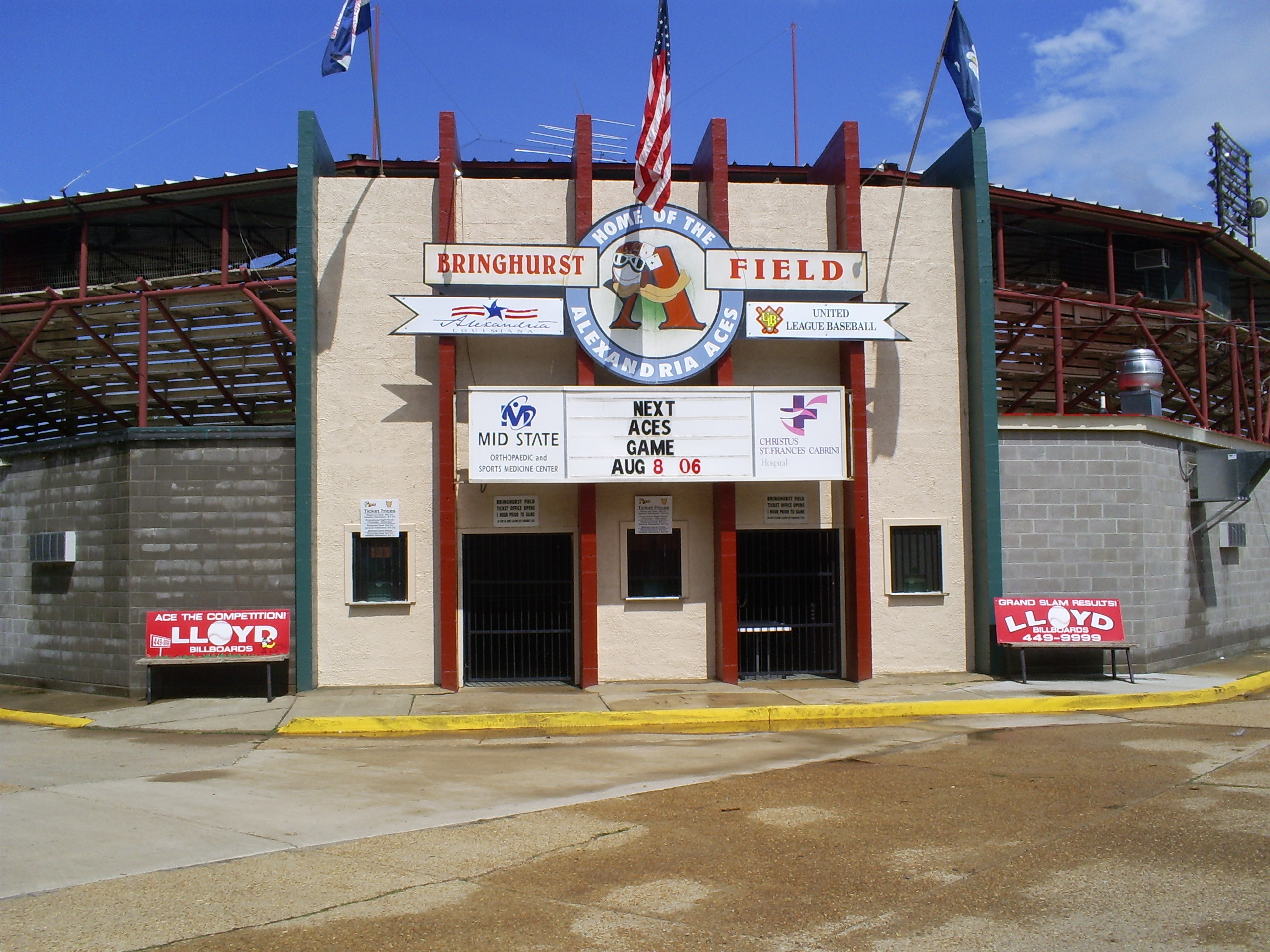
Bringhurst Field Entrance

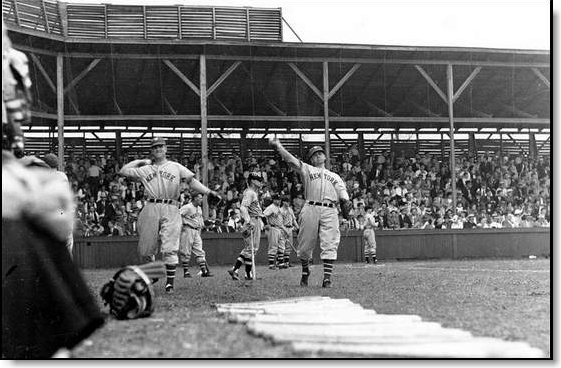
Bringhurst Field - Field Level
