= Fort Worth Cats =

American professional baseball team

Logo
Cap insignia

Information
- Location: Fort Worth, Texas
- Ballpark: LaGrave Field (2002–2014)
- Founded: 2001
- Disbanded: 2014
- Nickname: The Cats
- League championships: 3 (2005, 2006, 2007)
- Former leagues: United League Baseball (2013–2014); North American League (2012); American Association (2006–2011); Central Baseball League (2002–2005); All-American Association (2001)
- Former ballpark: Lon Goldstein Field (2001)
- Colors: Blue, white
- Mascot: Dodger

The Fort Worth Cats were a professional baseball team based in Fort Worth, Texas, in the United States. The Cats were a member of the South Division of the now disbanded United League Baseball, which was not affiliated with Major League Baseball. From 2002 to 2014, the Cats played their home games at LaGrave Field.

Under the management of Wayne Terwilliger (2005) and Stan Hough (2006–2007), the team won the 2005 Central Baseball League championship and the 2006 and 2007 American Association championships.

== History ==
The new Cats began play in Fort Worth in 2001 at Lon Goldstein Field, which was their temporary home until the new ballpark was constructed. They were named after the original Fort Worth Cats, who played mostly in the Texas League until 1964. Former Cats' owner Carl Bell commissioned a new Lagrave Field to be built directly on top of the original stadium's location. Home plate is exactly where it was in 1926 when the old facility opened. On May 23, 2002, the Cats opened up the season in their brand new home. The team's mascot was Dodger, whose namesake is a tribute to the Cats' affiliation with the great Brooklyn Dodgers teams in the 1940s and 1950s.

=== 2005 ===
Under the management of Wayne Terwilliger, the Cats defeated the San Angelo Colts for the 2005 Central Baseball League championship after beating the Pensacola Pelicans in the first round of the playoffs. It was Fort Worth's first championship since 1948. They won both halves of the season with identical 30–17 records, which was a franchise record for wins in a season. The Cats also made the playoffs in 2003, which was Terwilliger's first season as manager.

Stan Hough was named the Cats' new manager on December 6, 2005, taking over for Terwilliger, who remained with the club as Hough's first base coach in 2006. Prior to being named the manager, Hough was the team's hitting instructor from 2004 to 2005. Prior to the Cats' job, his last managerial job was with the Delmarva Shorebirds, which is a Class-A affiliate of the Baltimore Orioles, in 2003. He also managed the Triple-A Ottawa Lynx in 2001.

=== 2006 ===
In 2006, the Cats changed leagues and joined the new American Association. They won their second straight title and their first title in the new league by beating the St. Paul Saints 3 games to 2 in the championship series. The 2006 regular season record was 56–39 with a 0.589 winning percentage. The total season attendance was 177,894 for 46 games, which was an average of 3,867 per game. Luke Hochevar pitched for the Cats in 2006, making four starts (1–1, 2.38 ERA) prior to being drafted #1 overall in the 2006 Major League Baseball draft by the Kansas City Royals.

=== 2007 ===
On September 8, 2007, the Cats defeated the St. Paul Saints 4–1 in the fifth game of the American Association Championship playoffs to capture a second straight American Association Championship and third straight overall. The Cats had won 6 straight decisive Game 5's and were 13–0 in games in which they faced elimination the last 3 seasons. They had been down 2 games to 1 in 5 of the last 6 series following a pattern of winning the first game, losing the next two, and then winning games 4 and 5. The only exception was when they were down 2–0 to the El Paso Diablos in the 2007 Division Series before winning 3 straight at LaGrave Field. The 2007 regular season record was 53–40 with a 0.570 winning percentage. Total season attendance was 141,330 for 34 games, which was an average of 4,157 per game. Max Scherzer was on the Cats roster in 2007. In 2008, he was called up to the Arizona Diamondbacks.

=== 2008–2009 ===
The 2008 regular season record was 60–36 with a 0.625 winning percentage. Total season attendance was 185,380 for 47 games, which was an average of 3,944 per game. The team was named Organization of the Year.

The 2009 regular season record was 53–43 with a 0.552 winning percentage. Total season attendance was 177,807 for 48 games, which was an average 3,704 per game.

=== 2010 ===
The 2010 regular season record was 37–56 with a 0.398 winning percentage. Total season attendance was 122,062 for 41 games, which was an average of 2,707 per game. The team was managed by Chad Tredaway, who was assisted by pitching coach James Frisbie, assistant coach Steve Maddock, and first base coach Wayne Terwilliger. In November 2010, the Cats again hired Stan Hough as their new team manager. Hough also managed the team from 2006 to 2007, was 109–79, and led the Cats to the American Association championship in each season.

=== 2011 ===
The 2011 regular season record was 48–52 with a 0.480 winning percentage, which placed the team in second in the Southern Division. Total season attendance was 108,020 for 50 games, which was an average of 2,160 per game. First baseman Trent Lockwood, and catcher Kelley Gulledge were named to the American Association Postseason All-Star Team. Heading into the season's final game, Lockwood, in his first season with the team, was batting .338 with 20 HR, 90 RBI, a .621 slugging percentage, and 60 extra base hits. Gulledge was hitting .341 with 14 HR, 71 RBI, 125 hits, and 73 runs. On December 21, 2011, it was announced that the team was sold to a group led by John Bryant and Byron Pierce, co-founders of United League Baseball, which had merged to become part of the North American Baseball League.

=== 2012 ===
In January 2012, Carl Bell and the LaGrave Reconstruction Co. declared bankruptcy, which cast doubt on the future of LaGrave Field. Several months later, the debt holder, Amegy Bank of Houston, foreclosed and became the landlord of the Cats. On the field, the team reached the United League championship game in September 2012, but were swept by the Edinburg Roadrunners.

=== 2014 ===
In March 2014, the Cats announced the hiring of their new manager in Mike Marshall for the 2014 season. In May 2014, the Cats signed 55-year-old Julio Franco. The 1990 All-Star MVP last played professionally in 2008. During the 2014 season, Mike Marshall resigned his duties as manager. In July of that season, the Cats assigned the managerial duties to Barrett Weaver.

=== Dissolution ===
Due to an issue between the owner of the property on which LaGrave Field sits and the city of Fort Worth, the Cats were asked to relocate to another stadium after the 2014 season. Team owner John Bryant had stated the Cats intended to play the 2015 season, but acknowledged they might have to relocate to a different city in North Texas. In December 2014, Bryant stated that if the team could not find a place to play by January, the team's future would be in doubt.

In January 2015, the Cats' league, United League Baseball (ULB) announced it had ceased operations after seven seasons. One of the glaring issues of the ULB in the 2014 season was their inability to draw fans. Brownsville and Rio Grande teams shared Harlingen Field, the Fort Worth Cats played out of LaGrave Field, and the San Angelo Colts played at Foster Field. The league drew an average of about 744 fans a game between the three venues. The club has not been active since the end of the ULB, and their former website is no longer in operation.

== Modern championship titles ==
Year	League	Manager
2007	American Association	Stan Hough
2006	American Association	Stan Hough
2005	Central Baseball League	Wayne Terwilliger

== Retired numbers ==
- Number 4 worn by Duke Snider in 1946 – Retired May 23, 2003
- Number 10 worn by Bobby Bragan who played and managed from 1948 to 1952 – Retired May 21, 2004
- Number 6 worn by Maury Wills in 1955 – Retired June 18, 2005
- Number 1 worn by Sparky Anderson in 1955 – Retired June 17, 2006
- Number 42 worn by Jackie Robinson – Retired July 25, 2007
- Number 5 worn by Dick Williams from 1948 to 1950 and again in 1955 – Retired June 6, 2008 (see note below)
