= United League Baseball =

Sports league in Texas (2006–2015)

- United League Baseball logo
- Sport: Baseball
- Founded: 2006
- Folded: 2015
- No. of teams: 4
- Country: USA
- Last champion: Rio Grande Valley WhiteWings
- Most titles: Amarillo Dillas (3)
- Website: Official website

United League Baseball was an independent baseball league that operated in Texas. The league operated from 2006 to 2009. The league then temporarily merged with the Northern League and the Golden Baseball League to form the North American League from 2011–2012. However, after the North American League folded at the end of the 2012 season, ULB was reformed. It dissolved for a second time in January 2015.

== History ==
The league began its first season on May 16, 2006, with six teams: the Alexandria Aces, Amarillo Dillas, Edinburg Coyotes, Laredo Broncos, Rio Grande Valley WhiteWings and San Angelo Colts. The San Angelo franchise previously played in the now-defunct Central Baseball League, while the Amarillo Dillas previously played in the now-defunct Texas–Louisiana League. The United League was originally owned by an investor group United Sports Equity LLC followed by former Congressman John Bryant.

In 2013, following the dissolution of the North American League, United League Baseball was reincorporated. The league played an 80-game season from late May to the middle of August, and featured the Edinburg Roadrunners, the Fort Worth Cats, the Rio Grande Valley WhiteWings, the San Angelo Colts, the Texas Thunder, and the Alexandria Aces. Alexandria and Texas were shut down mid-season. Edinburg did not field a team for 2014 and they were replaced by the Brownsville Charros.

The San Angelo Colts announced on July 2, 2014, that they had filed for Chapter 11 bankruptcy protection. Although it was stated at the time that operations would not be affected, the team announced on August 11, 2014, that the final eight games of the 2014 regular season would not be played. Originally scheduled to end August 24, the league's 2014 regular season ended August 15, with the best-of-five championship series between the Cats and the WhiteWings starting August 16. The United League Baseball was looking into possibly expanding to Del Rio, Texas, and was scheduled to meet with city officials in October 2014.

In November 2014, it was announced that the City of Ft. Worth had not renewed the lease at LaGrave Field for the Ft. Worth Cats, thus leaving them without a home for the 2015 season. Through the mismanagement of the league by Bryant and Pierce and having one remaining stadium lease in Harlingen the league was formally disbanded in January 2015.

== Franchises ==
United League Baseball
Team	Years played	Location	Homefield	Capacity	Notes
Alexandria Aces	2006–2008, 2013	Alexandria, Louisiana	Bringhurst Field	3,500	Charter member, moved to the Continental Baseball League and later the Texas Collegiate League. Disbanded mid-way through the 2013 season.
Amarillo Dillas	2006–2010	Amarillo, Texas	Potter County Memorial Stadium	8,500	Charter member
Brownsville Charros	2014	Harlingen, Texas	Harlingen Field	4,500	
Coastal Bend/McAllen/Texas Thunder	2009–2010, 2013	Robstown, Texas; McAllen, Texas	Fairgrounds Field	5,200	Played in the North American League from 2011–2012
Edinburg Coyotes/Roadrunners	1996–2010, 2013	Edinburg, Texas	Edinburg Stadium	4,000	Charter member, Played in North American League from 2011–2012, rejoined in 2013 and folded after the season.
Fort Worth Cats	2013–2014	Fort Worth, Texas	LaGrave Field	4,100	Previously played in the All-American Association, Central Baseball League, American Association and North American League.
Harlingen/Rio Grande Valley WhiteWings	2006–2010, 2013–2014	Harlingen, Texas	Harlingen Field	4,500	Charter member, played in the North American League from 2011–2012
Laredo Broncos	2006–2010	Laredo, Texas	Veterans Field	5,000	Charter member
San Angelo Colts	2006–2010, 2013–2014	San Angelo, Texas	Foster Field	4,200	Charter member, had previously played in the Texas–Louisiana League and the Central Baseball League. Played in the North American League from 2011–2012.

== Standings ==
=== 2006 season ===
Team	W	L	Win %	GB
*** Edinburg Coyotes	57	33	.633	---
^ San Angelo Colts	46	44	.511	11
^ Alexandria Aces	45	44	.506	11.5
^ Laredo Broncos	44	46	.489	13
Amarillo Dillas	39	50	.438	17.5
Rio Grande Valley WhiteWings	38	52	.422	19

=== 2007 Winter Season ===
Team	W	L	Win %	GB
*** Brownsville Toros	17	3	.850	---
^ Rio Grande Valley WhiteWings	10	10	.500	7
Laredo Broncos	8	12	.400	9
Edinburg Coyotes	5	15	.250	12

=== 2007 season ===
Team	W	L	Win %	GB
* Rio Grande Valley WhiteWings	29	21	.580	---
Alexandria Aces	27	22	.551	1.5
Amarillo Dillas	26	24	.520	3
Edinburg Coyotes	25	25	.500	4
San Angelo Colts	22	28	.440	7
Laredo Broncos	20	29	.408	8.5

Team	W	L	Win %	GB
** Alexandria Aces	32	13	.711	---
San Angelo Colts	22	22	.500	9.5
Amarillo Dillas	21	24	.467	11
* Rio Grande Valley WhiteWings	21	24	.467	11
Laredo Broncos	21	25	.457	11.5
Edinburg Coyotes	18	27	.400	14.5

^ Clinched Playoff Spot
* Clinched 1st Half Title
** Clinched 2nd Half Title
*** Clinched Regular Season Title

=== 2008 season ===
Team	W	L	Win %	GB
^** San Angelo Colts	54	29	.651	---
*** Alexandria Aces	50	35	.588	5
* Amarillo Dillas	50	36	.581	5.5
**** Edinburg Coyotes	41	44	.482	14
Laredo Broncos	39	48	.448	17
Harlingen WhiteWings	20	62	.244	33.5

* Clinched 1st Playoff Seed
** Clinched 2nd Playoff Seed
*** Clinched 3rd Playoff Seed
**** Clinched 4th Playoff Seed
^ Clinched Regular Season Championship

=== 2009 season ===
Team	W	L	Win %	GB
San Angelo Colts*^	48	32	.600	---
Edinburg Roadrunners**	46	34	.575	2
Amarillo Dillas***	44	35	.557	3.5
Coastal Bend Thunder****	39	40	.494	8.5
Rio Grande Valley WhiteWings	39	41	.488	9.5
Laredo Broncos	23	57	.288	25

* Clinched 1st Playoff Seed
** Clinched 2nd Playoff Seed
*** Clinched 3rd Playoff Seed
**** Clinched 4th Playoff Seed
^ Clinched Regular Season Championship

=== 2010 season ===
Team	W	L	Win %	GB
Amarillo Dillas*^	52	39	.571	---
Edinburg Roadrunners**	50	39	.561	1
Laredo Broncos***	47	45	.511	5.5
Rio Grande Valley WhiteWings****	47	45	.511	5.5
San Angelo Colts	46	45	.505	6
Coastal Bend Thunder	31	60	.342	21

* Clinched 1st Playoff Seed
** Clinched 2nd Playoff Seed
*** Clinched 3rd Playoff Seed
**** Clinched 4th Playoff Seed
^ Clinched Regular Season Championship

== Playoffs ==
=== 2014 Playoff Results ===
ULB Championship

Rio Grande Valley WhiteWings	3
Fort Worth Cats	0

=== 2013 Playoff Results ===
Format: When the league returned for the 2013 season the United League paired the top two regular season teams in a best of 5 ULB Championship series.

ULB Championship

Edinburg Roadrunners	3
Fort Worth Cats	2

=== 2010 Playoff Results ===
Format: for the 2010 season the United League playoffs consisted of 4 teams competing in 2 rounds, with the top 4 regular season teams making the playoffs. In the first round the regular season champion faced the 4th seed while seed 2 faced seed 3 in the best of 3 series. The winners then advanced to the championship best-of-five series.

1st Round
1	Amarillo Dillas	2
4	Rio Grande Valley WhiteWings	0
2	Edinburg Roadrunners	2
3	Laredo Broncos	1

ULB Championship
1	Amarillo Dillas	3
2	Edinburg Roadrunners	1

=== 2009 Playoff Results ===
Format: for the 2009 season the United League playoffs consisted of 4 teams competing in 2 rounds, with the top 4 regular season teams making the playoffs. In the first round the regular season champion faced the 4th seed while seed 2 faced seed 3 in the best of 3 series. The winners then advanced to the championship best-of-five series.

1st Round
1	San Angelo Colts	2
4	Coastal Bend Thunder	0
2	Edinburg Roadrunners	1
3	Amarillo Dillas	2

ULB Championship
1	San Angelo Colts	2
3	Amarillo Dillas	3

=== 2008 Playoff Results ===
Format: for the 2008 season the United League playoffs will consist of 4 teams competing in 2 rounds. In the first round the top two teams at the end of the first half of the season will host the two remaining teams with the best overall winning percentage throughout the season in a best-of-three series. The winners then advance to the championship which will be played at both parks, with the lower seed hosting game one and the higher seed hosting games two and three of the best-of-three series.

1st Round
1	Amarillo Dillas	2
4	Edinburg Coyotes	0
2	San Angelo Colts	1
3	Alexandria Aces	2

ULB Championship
1	Amarillo Dillas	2
3	Alexandria Aces	1

=== 2007 Playoff Results ===
Format: for the 2007 season the United League played in a split season format, crowning a first half champion and a second half champion. The champions then played for the ULB Championship. If one team was to win both halves, the team with the second-best overall season record would have qualified for the playoffs as a wild card. The championship series was the best 4 out of 7 games, to be played home and away in a 2–3–2 site format, with home field advantage awarded to the first half champion.

ULB Championship

Alexandria Aces	4
Rio Grande Valley WhiteWings	0

=== 2006 Playoff Results ===
Format: for the 2006 season the top four teams in the regular season standings made the playoffs, including the regular season champion and 3 wild card teams. The playoffs then commenced with two rounds of games to determine the United League champion:

- 1st Round – Best 2 out of 3 games
- Championship – Best 3 out of 5 games

1st Round
1	Edinburg Coyotes	2
4	Laredo Broncos	1
2	San Angelo Colts	1
3	Alexandria Aces	2

ULB Championship
1	Edinburg Coyotes	1
3	Alexandria Aces	3

== ULB Champions ==
=== Key ===
**Bold**	Winning team of the Finals
^{†}	Had or tied for the best regular season record for that season
Team (X)	Denotes the number of times the team has won (also includes past names of franchise, if applicable)

Year	Champion	Result	Runner-up	Most Valuable Player
2006	**Alexandria Aces** (1)	3–1	Edinburg Coyotes^{†}	Josh Tranum (Alexandria Aces)
2007	**Alexandria Aces**^{†} (2)	4–0	Rio Grande Valley WhiteWings	Palmer Karr (Alexandria Aces)
2008	**Amarillo Dillas** (1)	2–1	Alexandria Aces	Danny Bravo (Amarillo Dillas)
2009	**Amarillo Dillas** (2)	3–2	San Angelo Colts^{†}	Keanon Simon (Amarillo Dillas); Dustin Taylor (Amarillo Dillas)
2010	**Amarillo Dillas**^{†} (3)	3–1	Edinburg Roadrunners	Kevin Butler (Amarillo Dillas); Carlos Figueroa (Amarillo Dillas)
2013	**Edinburg Roadrunners** (1)	3–2	Fort Worth Cats	N/A
2014	**Rio Grande Valley WhiteWings**^{†} (1)	3–0	Fort Worth Cats	N/A

== All-star game ==
United League Baseball hosted an annual All-Star Game which rotated host cities throughout the league. Its format in 2008 featured the United League all-stars versus the Golden League all-stars. In 2006 the first All-Star Game pitted the best team against the all-stars from the rest of the United League. In 2007 the second All-Star Game pitted Team North (All-Stars from Alexandria, Amarillo and San Angelo) against Team Rio Grande (All-Stars from Edinburg, Laredo and Rio Grande Valley).

The ULB's all-star festivities were a two-day event, the first day featuring various celebrations and recognitions, followed on the second day by the Home Run Derby and the All-Star Game.

=== Game Results ===
- 2006 – United League Baseball All-Stars 12, Edinburg Coyotes 2 (Edinburg, Texas)
- 2007 – Team North 10, Team Rio Grande 1 (Amarillo, Texas)
- 2008 – United League Baseball All-Stars 8, Golden League 5 (San Angelo, Texas)

=== Most Valuable Players ===
- 2006 – Edwin Maldonado, Laredo Broncos
- 2007 – Jonathan Reynoso, Amarillo Dillas
- 2008 – Luany Sanchez, Laredo Broncos

=== Home Run Derby Winners ===
- 2006 – Jose Olmeda, Edinburg Coyotes
- 2007 – Juan Lebron, Laredo Broncos
- 2008 – Andres Rodriguez, San Angelo Colts

== League awards ==
=== Most Valuable Player ===
- 2006 – John Anderson, San Angelo Colts
- 2007 – Nelson Teilon, Edinburg Coyotes
- 2008 – Danny Bravo, Amarillo Dillas
- 2010 – Levy Ventura, Rio Grande Valley

=== Manager of the Year ===
- 2006 – Vince Moore, Edinburg Coyotes; Ricky VanAsselberg, Alexandria Aces
- 2007 – Ricky VanAsselberg, Alexandria Aces
- 2008 – Brady Bogart, Amarillo Dillas
- 2009 – Doc Edwards, San Angelo Colts
- 2010 – Dan Firova, Laredo Broncos

=== Pitcher of the Year ===
- 2006 – Ryan Harris, Edinburg Coyotes; Santo Hernandez, Alexandria Aces
- 2007 – Adam Cox (baseball), Alexandria Aces
- 2009 – Brian Henschel, San Angelo Colts
- 2010 – Wardell Starling, Edinburg Roadrunners

=== Rookie of the Year ===
- 2007 – Ronnie Gaines, San Angelo Colts
- 2009 – Trent Lockwood, Amarillo Dillas
- 2010 – Adam De La Garza, Amarillo Dillas; Jonathan Cisneros, Laredo Broncos

=== Playing Surface of the Year ===
- 2007 – Foster Field, San Angelo Colts
- 2010 – Foster Field, San Angelo Colts
