= Coastal Bend Aviators =

Former minor league baseball team from Robstown, Texas

Logo
Cap insignia

Information
- Location: Robstown, Texas
- Ballpark: Aviators Stadium
- Founded: 2003
- Folded: 2007
- Former name: Coastal Bend Aviators (2003–07)
- Former leagues: Central Baseball League (2003–05); American Association (2006–07)
- Colors: cardinal red, navy blue
- General manager: Rudy A. Rodriguez
- Website: www.aviatorsbaseball.com

The Coastal Bend Aviators were a minor league baseball team which played in Robstown, Texas, in the United States from 2003 to 2007. They were a member of the Central Baseball League, then the American Association and were not affiliated with any Major League Baseball team.

The team played at Aviators Stadium.
