= San Angelo Colts =

- Logo

Information
- League: United League Baseball (2013–2014)
- Location: San Angelo, Texas
- Ballpark: Foster Field
- Founded: 2000
- Disbanded: 2014
- League championships: 1 (2002)
- Former leagues: North American League (2011–12); United League Baseball (2006–10); Central Baseball League (2002–05); Texas–Louisiana League (2000–01)
- Colors: Burgundy, silver, white, black
- Ownership: Reunion Sports Group
- Manager: Doc Edwards
- Media: San Angelo Standard-Times
- Website: www.sanangelocolts.com

The San Angelo Colts were a professional baseball team based in San Angelo, Texas, in the United States. The Colts were most recently a member of United League Baseball, an independent professional league which was not affiliated with Major League Baseball or Minor League Baseball. The Colts played their home games at Foster Field.

The team experienced declining attendance in later years and announced on July 2, 2014, that it had filed for Chapter 11 bankruptcy protection. Although it was stated at the time that operations would not be affected, the team announced on August 11, 2014, that the final 8 games of the 2014 season would not be played.

The combination of the Colts' financial issues, the loss of the home stadium of the Fort Worth Cats and low attendance led to the folding of United League Baseball, and all of its member teams, in January 2015.

== Team record ==
Season	W	L	Win %	Result
2000	69	43	.616	Wild Card
2001	49	47	.510	Wild Card
2002	50	46	.521	Central Baseball League Champions
2003	47	48	.495	
2004	36	58	.383	
2005	46	47	.495	Wild Card
2006	46	44	.511	Wild Card
2007	44	50	.468	
2008	55	29	.651	2nd Half Season Champions
2009	48	32	.600	Regular Season Champions
2010	46	45	.505	
2011	52	36	.591	Regular Season Champions
2012	51	45	.531	
2013	39	40	.494	
2014	33	39	.458	

== League All-Stars ==
=== Players ===
2000

- Gabe Duross, 1B
- Guy Giuffre, DH
- Toby McDermott, LHP
- Chad Tredaway, 3B

2001

- Manny Lopez, OF
- Will Roland, SS
- Franklin Taveras, UTL
- Jeremy McClain, RHP

2002

- Mike Kirkpatrick, OF
- Marc Mirizzi, SS
- Nestor Smith, OF
- Gilbert Landestoy P

2006

- John Anderson, IF
- Brian Baker, OF
- Kevin Bass, DH
- Jason Crosland, IF
- Adam Hanson, RHP
- Brantley Jordan, LHP
- Tony Sanguinetti, C

2007

- Josh Allan, C
- Stephen Artz, RHP
- Jason Crosland, 1B
- Ronnie Gaines, OF
- Andres Rodriguez, 3B
- Chace Vacek, RHP
- Madison Edwards, OF

2008

- Bryan Frichter, OF
- Luke Massetti, RHP
- Andres Rodriguez, 1B
- José Torres, OF

=== Coaches ===
2000–2001

- Dan Madsen, Manager

2006

- Doc Edwards, Manager

2008–2009

- Doc Edwards, Manager

== Historical use of the name ==
The original San Angelo Colts played in the Class D West Texas League in 1922. The team had started out as the San Angelo Bronchos the year before.

In 1948, another team using the Colts name began play in the Longhorn League. When the league changed names to the Southwestern League in 1956, the Colts stayed on board, but folded before the start of the 1957 season.

The Colts had been a part of independent baseball since 2000 with the Texas–Louisiana League (2000–2001), Central Baseball League (2002–2005), United League Baseball (2006–2010) and North American League (2011–2012).
