= Amarillo Dillas =

Logo
Cap insignia

Information
- Location: Amarillo, Texas
- Ballpark: Potter County Memorial Stadium
- Founded: 1994
- Folded: 2011
- League championships: 4 (1999, 2008, 2009, 2010)
- Division championships: 7 (1995, 1997, 1998, 1999, 2000, 2008, 2010)
- Former leagues: Texas–Louisiana League (1994–00); Central Baseball League (2001–04); United League Baseball (2006–10)
- Colors: Blue, red
- Ownership: Reunion Sports Group
- General manager: Mark Lee
- Manager: Brady Bogart
- Media: Amarillo Globe-News
- Website: www.myamarillodillas.com

The Amarillo Dillas were a professional baseball team based in Amarillo, Texas, in the United States. The Dillas were a member of United League Baseball, an independent professional league which is not affiliated with Major League Baseball or Minor League Baseball. From 1994 to 2010, the Dillas played their home games at historic Potter County Memorial Stadium, nicknamed the "Dilla Villa."

== History ==
The Amarillo Dillas were a charter member of the independent Texas–Louisiana League, which was formed in 1994. The Dillas were a strong team in the early years of the Texas–Louisiana League, claiming the regular season champion title in 1995, 1998, and 2000. They would win the first half championship in 1997 and were the 1999 Texas–Louisiana League champions. The Texas–Louisiana League was renamed the Central Baseball League in 2002, and several new teams were added. The Dillas struggled with attendance after the expansion, only averaging 846 fans in their championship series appearance in 2004. A neglected stadium and erosion of local fan support resulted in the Dillas being dropped from the Central League following the 2004 season in favor of the El Paso Diablos.

The Amarillo Dillas were brought back in 2006 as one of six charter members of the independent United League Baseball (ULB). The new Amarillo Dillas management renovated the entire stadium, including a new field and new seats. The Amarillo Dillas just missed the playoffs in their first two seasons in the new league. In 2008, the Dillas posted a 54–37 record, claiming first-half champion honors. In the playoffs, Amarillo defeated Alexandria for their first league championship since 1999. Amarillo would continue their success in 2009 with a 44–35 record and another championship, defeating San Angelo for the title. The Dillas would win the title again in 2010, becoming the first United League three-peat champions.

In October 2010, the Dillas were evicted from Potter County Memorial Stadium. Reunion Sports Group, the parent company of the Dillas, could not pay the $75,000 lease on the stadium. In November 2010, Potter County commissioners awarded the bid for the 2011 use of the stadium to Scott Berry, owner of Southern Independent Baseball and franchisee with the American Association of Independent Professional Baseball. The Dillas were replaced by the Amarillo Sox in the 2011 season.

== Team record ==
List of Amarillo Dillas seasons
| Year | W-L | PCT | League | Postseason |
|---|---|---|---|---|
| 1994 | 48-40 | .546 | Texas-Lou. | |
| 1995 | 64-36 | .640 | Texas-Lou. | RS Champs |
| 1996 | 43-57 | .430 | Texas-Lou. | |
| 1997 | 55-33 | .625 | Texas-Lou. | 1st Half Champs |
| 1998 | 64-20 | .762 | Texas-Lou. | RS Champs |
| 1999 | 63-21 | .750 | Texas-Lou. | TLL Champs |
| 2000 | 76-36 | .679 | Texas-Lou. | RS Champs |
| 2001 | 49-45 | .521 | Central | |
| 2002 | 46-50 | .479 | Central | |
| 2003 | 48-46 | .511 | Central | |
| 2003 | 48-46 | .511 | Central | Wild Card |
| 2004 | 36-58 | .383 | Central | Wild Card |
| 2005 | No team | | | |
| 2006 | 39-50 | .438 | United | |
| 2007 | 47-48 | .495 | United | |
| 2008 | 54-37 | .593 | United | 1st Half/ULB Champs |
| 2009 | 44-35 | .557 | United | ULB Champs |
| 2010 | 52-39 | .571 | United | RS Champs/ULB Champs |
