= Harlingen Field =

Baseball park in Harlingen, Texas, US

Coordinates: 26°12′10.37″N 97°42′34.43″W

Harlingen Field (also known as Harlingen Municipal Stadium, Lon Hill Ballpark, or Giants Field) is a baseball park in Harlingen, Texas, that has been home to professional baseball, such as the Rio Grande Valley WhiteWings and the Harlingen Giants, and high school baseball. It has undergone numerous expansions and renovations throughout its fifty-year history, most notably in the early 2000s.

== Sources ==
- "Ghost Leagues: Minor League Baseball in South Texas," Noe Torres, c.2005
