= Alexandria Aces =

American minor-league professional baseball team

Logo
Cap insignia

Information
- Location: Alexandria, Louisiana
- Ballpark: Bringhurst Field
- Founded: 1994
- Disbanded: 2013
- League championships: 5 (1997, 1998, 2006, 2007, 2009)
- Division championships: 6 (1994, 1995, 1997, 2001, 2002, 2007)
- Former leagues: United League Baseball (2013); Texas Collegiate League (2010-12); Continental Baseball League (2009); United League Baseball (2006-08); Central Baseball League (2001-03); Texas–Louisiana League (1994–2001); Texas League (1972–1975); Evangeline Baseball League (1946–1957); Evangeline Baseball League (1934–1942)
- Colors: Black, red, yellow, white, brown
- Ownership: Aces Baseball, Inc. & Alexandria Community Baseball, LLC
- Media: Alexandria Daily Town Talk

The Alexandria Aces were a baseball team based in Alexandria, Louisiana. The last version of the Aces played in the United League Baseball in 2013. The Aces have played their home games at historic Bringhurst Field, which was built in 1933 for the original Alexandria Aces.

== History ==
That team started in 1934 as a member of the old Evangeline League and ceased operations with the league in 1942 due to World War II. This early era was highlighted by the presence of Hal Newhouser and Virgil Trucks, future Detroit Tigers' stars who headed the pitching staff of the 1939 Aces. The Aces (and the league) were revived after the war but once again ceased operations in 1957. Alexandria was the only city to field a team every year the Evangeline League operated. The Aces appeared regularly in the league's Shaughnessy playoffs and took the Evangeline pennant twice — in 1936 and 1940.

Baseball returned to Alexandria again from 1972, with the Aces as the San Diego Padres' AA farm club, and while it only lasted four years, many major league notables passed through Alexandria – in particular All-Star pitcher Randy Jones and longtime Cleveland Indians first baseman John Grubb. Duke Snider also managed the team during this period.

The new Aces were a charter member of the independent Texas–Louisiana League in 1994, and the Aces won back-to-back titles in 1997 and 1998 before the league changed its name to the Central Baseball League. In the first season of the new United League in 2006, the Aces won the inaugural ULB championship before pulling off another repeat as they would win the title once again in 2007. In 2009 the Aces joined the Continental Baseball League when the ULB went bankrupt. The Aces are the 2009 CBL Champions, beating the Big Bend Cowboys 2–0. In 2010, the Aces ended their contract with the CBL, citing travel costs among other reasons before joining the college wooden bat league, the Texas Collegiate League.

On March 12, 2011 the front office announced that there would be a change to the team's logo for the first time since the team returned in 1994.

In 2013, the Aces joined United League Baseball and slightly past the halfway mark of the season, with a 24–20 record and in second place, the United League cancelled the remaining games for the Aces. Four scheduled road games were forfeited, giving the Aces an official record of 24-24. According to league CEO John Bryant, the league could not justify spending at least $100,000 for the remainder of the season because of low attendance, averaging 333 fans a game.

== Team Record ==
Alexandria Aces Baseball	Wins	Losses	Result
1994	53	35	Eastern Division Champions, TLL Runner Up
1995	57	43	Southern Division Champions; TLL Runner Up
1996	42	58	Fifth Place
1997	48	40	Texas Louisiana League Champions
1998	58	26	Texas Louisiana League Champions
1999	48	36	Texas Louisiana League Runner Up
2000	51	61	Fifth Place
2001	62	34	Second Place
2002	59	37	Second Half Eastern Division Champions
2003	40	56	Missed playoffs
2006	45	44	United League Champions
2007	64	35	United League Champions
2008	53	38	Wild Card; Runner Up
2009	39	21	Continental Baseball League Champions
2010	29	38	Missed playoffs
2013	24	20	Team folded in Second Place on July 9

== All-Stars ==
1994: Paul Williams, C; Marvin Cole, 2B; Jay Andrews, OF; Alan Newman, LHP
1995: Fletcher Thompson, 3B; Kyle Shade, OF; Joe Ronca, DH;
1996: Malvin Matos, OF; Joe Ronca, DH;
1997: Kevin Tahan, C; John O'Brien, 1B; Kyle Shade, 3B;
1998: John O'Brien, 1B; Robert Hewes, UT; Kyle Shade, OF; Malvin Matos, DH; Russ Reeder, RHP; Tony Mack, RHP;
1999: John O'Brien, 1B; Marvin Cole, 2B; Ryan Rothe, OF; Russ Reeder, RHP; Darell White, RHP;
2000: Robert Hewes, SS; Andre Johnson, OF;
2001: Trey Salinas, C; Joe Hamilton, DH; Rob Vael, LHP;
2002: Jerry Valdez, C; Robert Hewes, 2B; Jorge Alvarez, DH; David Istre, C;
2003: N/A
2006: Fontella Jones, RHP; Santo Hernandez, RHP; Luis Guance, SS; Keto Anderson, OF; Erick Mejias, UT; Trey Beamon, OF; Adam Bonner, 1B/RF; Adam Cox, LHP;
2007: Justin Dowdy, LHP; Luis Galaraga, RHP; Luis Guance, SS; Frank James, LHP; Palmer Karr, OF; Selwyn Langaigne, OF; Juan Carlos Ovalles, RHP; Josh Tranum, DH; Jose Umbria, C;
2008: Luis Guance, 2B; Chad Linder, LHP; Juan Carlos Ovalles, RHP; Bryan Sabatella, UT;
2009: Aaron Kalb, RHP; Will Krout, RHP; Nathan Stewart, RHP; Rhett Barber, LHP; Andy Schon, RHP; Aric Weinburg, OF; Nicholas Enciso, C;
2010:

== Coaches ==
1994: Pete Falcone, Manager
1995–1999: Stan Cliburn, Manager
2000–2002: John O'Brien, Manager
2003: Robert Lichtenstein, Manager
2006–2008: Ricky VanAsselberg, Manager
2009: Dan Schwam, Manager
2010–2011: Mike Byrnes, Head Coach
2011: Freddy Rodríguez, Head Coach
2013: Von Hayes, Manager
