= Fairgrounds Field =

Ballpark in Robstown, Texas, US

Coordinates: 27.789893°N 97.651028°W

- Interactive map of Fairgrounds Field
- Former names: Aviators Stadium, Richard Borchard Fairgrounds Field, Nueces County Sports Complex
- Location: 1011 Texas Yes Blvd. Robstown, Texas, United States
- Capacity: 5,200
- Field size: Left - 330'; Center - 400'; Right - 330'

Construction
- Opened: 2003

Tenants
- Coastal Bend Thunder (ULB) (2009-2011); Corpus Christi Fuel (SPSL) (2010-2012); Corpus Christi Beach Dawgs (CBL) (2008); Coastal Bend Aviators (2003-2007)

Fairgrounds Field is a ballpark located in Robstown, Texas. It was the home stadium of the Coastal Bend Thunder of the United League Baseball and the Corpus Christi Fuel of the Southern Premier Soccer League and the former home of the Corpus Christi Beach Dawgs of the Continental Baseball League and the Coastal Bend Aviators. In 2024, Women's Professional Fastpitch announced the expansion team Coastal Tidal will use the field as their home field. The Richard M. Borchard Regional Fairgrounds is an ongoing development project involving the area surrounding the existing stadium.
