= Central Baseball League =

Independent baseball league

- Most recent season or competition: 2005 Central Baseball League season
- Sport: Baseball
- Founded: 1994
- Ceased: 2005
- No. of teams: 25
- Country: United States

The Central Baseball League, formerly the Texas–Louisiana League, was an independent baseball league whose member teams were not affiliated with any Major League Baseball (MLB) franchises.

In 1991, potential owners, Dallas businessman Byron Pierce and U. S. Congressman John Bryant, became frustrated that the Texas League had no plans to expand into other Texas locations, and formed The Texas–Louisiana League. The league began play in 1994. After further expansion into Missouri and Mississippi, the Texas–Louisiana League changed its name to the Central Baseball League. In 12 seasons, the league produced 10 different champions; Alexandria and Edinburg were the only teams to win a title twice.

After the 2005 season, the eight-team Central Baseball League disbanded. Five teams joined the American Association: Pensacola, Shreveport, Fort Worth, Coastal Bend and El Paso; and one joined the United League, San Angelo. Edinburg also received a franchise in the United League, unrelated to the now-defunct Roadrunners of the Central League.

== Teams ==
The following teams were, at one time, either a member of the Central Baseball League or the Texas–Louisiana League.

Central Baseball League (the United States)

Team Name	City	State	Joined	Left	Reason
Abilene Prairie Dogs	Abilene	Texas	1995	1999	Folded
Alexandria Aces	Alexandria	Louisiana	1994	2003	Folded, returned to the United League in 2006
Amarillo Dillas	Amarillo	Texas	1994	2004	Folded, returned to the United League in 2006
Beaumont Bullfrogs	Beaumont	Texas	1994	1994	Folded
Coastal Bend Aviators	Robstown	Texas	2003	2005	Joined the American Association
Corpus Christi Barracudas	Corpus Christi	Texas	1994	1995	Folded
Edinburg Roadrunners	Edinburg	Texas	2001	2005	Folded
El Paso Diablos	El Paso	Texas	2005	2005	Joined the American Association
Fort Worth Cats	Fort Worth	Texas	2002	2005	Joined the American Association
Greenville Bluesmen	Greenville	Mississippi	1998	2001	Folded
Jackson DiamondKats/Senators	Jackson	Mississippi	2000	2005	Folded
Lafayette/Bayou Bullfrogs	Lafayette	Louisiana	1998	2000	Folded
Laredo Apaches	Laredo	Texas	1995	1995	Folded
Lubbock Crickets	Lubbock	Texas	1995	1998	Folded
Mobile BaySharks	Mobile	Alabama	1994	1995	Folded
Pensacola Pelicans	Pensacola	Florida	2004	2005	Joined the American Association
Pueblo Bighorns	Pueblo	Colorado	1995	1995	Folded
Rio Grande Valley WhiteWings	Harlington	Texas	1994	2003	Folded, returned to the United League in 2006
San Antonio Tejanos	San Antonio	Texas	1994	1994	Transferred to Laredo
San Angelo Colts	San Angelo	Texas	2000	2005	Joined the United League
Shreveport-Bossier Sports	Shreveport	Louisiana	2003	2005	Joined the American Association
Springfield-Ozark Mountain Ducks	Ozark	Missouri	1999	2003	Joined the Frontier League
Tyler Wildcatters	Tyler	Texas	1994	1997	Folded

== Texas–Louisiana League champions ==
- 1994 Corpus Christi
- 1995 Lubbock
- 1996 Abilene
- 1997 Alexandria
- 1998 Alexandria
- 1999 Amarillo
- 2000 Rio Grande Valley
- 2001 Edinburg

== Central Baseball League champions ==
- 2002 San Angelo
- 2003 Jackson
- 2004 Edinburg
- 2005 Fort Worth
