= Somerton Stingers =

Professional independent baseball team in Arizona

Information
- League: Arizona Winter League (American)
- Location: Somerton, Arizona
- Ballpark: Desert Sun Stadium (Yuma, Arizona)
- Founded: 2012
- Division championships: 0
- Ownership: North American League
- Media: Yuma Sun
- Website: www.arizonawinterleague.com

The Somerton Stingers are a professional independent baseball team based in Somerton, Arizona, representing that city.

A member of the Arizona Winter League, the Stingers are an honor to the Yuma County, Arizona area of Major League Baseball spring training sites, one was the 1969–70 Seattle Pilots of the American League now the Milwaukee Brewers of the National League, and the folded Sonora Pilots/San Luis Atleticos, Tecate Brewers and Snow Falcons namesakes.

In 2011, the North American League which replaced the Golden Baseball League whom owned the AWL wanted to grant a team to Merced, California either with that or the "Pilot" or "Miner" (see Western Canada Miners) namesakes.

== League ==
They play in the developmental AWL a short-season instructional winter league affiliated with the North American League and play in the American Division, as well as the Arizona RoadRunners, Blythe Heat, Long Beach Armada, and Yuma Scorpions. The Arizona Summer League Scorpions were named the Yuma Panthers for the 2012 season, but the Panthers will play in the NAL instead. There's a proposal for a Tecate "Cervecario" (Spanish for "Brewer" name team).

The team plays their home games in 2012 at Desert Sun Stadium in Yuma, Arizona.

== Season-by-season records ==
Arizona Winter League:

Season	W	L	Win %	Place	Playoff
2012	N/A	N/A	N/A	N/A	Starting play in 2012.
