= Yuma Scorpions (Arizona Winter League baseball team) =

Former developmental baseball team

- Cap insignia

Information
- League: Arizona Winter League (2007-present) (American)
- Location: Yuma, Arizona
- Ballpark: Desert Sun Stadium (Yuma, Arizona)
- Founded: 2005
- League championships: 3 (2007, 2009, 2011)
- Division championships: 3 (2009, 2010, 2011)
- Former leagues: Golden Baseball League (2005–10); North American League (2011–12)
- Colors: Burgundy, Teal, Tan, Black
- Ownership: Diamond Sports & Entertainment
- Media: Yuma Sun
- Website: www.arizonawinterleague.com

The Yuma Scorpions were a professional developmental baseball team based in Yuma, Arizona. They were members of the Arizona Winter League, a short-season instructional league run by the North American League. They are owned by Diamond Sports & Entertainment LLC and are 3-time AWL Champions.

The Scorpions played in the American Division, as well as the Arizona RoadRunners, Blythe Heat, Long Beach Armada, and Somerton Stingers. The team has played their home games at Desert Sun Stadium in Yuma, Arizona since 2007 in the AWL and 2005 in the GBL/NAL.

== Team history ==
The identity began with the main franchise as a charter member of the Golden Baseball League in 2005 along with the Chico Outlaws, Fullerton Flyers, Japan Samurai Bears, Long Beach Armada, Mesa Miners, San Diego Surf Dawgs and Surprise Fightin' Falcons. The franchise had little to limited success in the GBL and a new team was formed as a part of the new developmental Arizona Winter League in 2007 with the Scorpions joining the Canada Miners and Sonora Pilots assuming new identities and the Scorpions and San Diego Surf Dawgs assuming the former GBL identities. It proved fruitful as the team won three AWL Championships in 2007, 2009 and 2011. Perhaps the most accomplished alumnus of the Scorpions AWL team is Sergio Romo, who was directly acquired by the San Francisco Giants without even playing a GBL game.

As for the original franchise, they joined the NAL as a charter member following the merger of the GBL and United League Baseball in 2011 and they have since been purchased from the league by Godfather Media LLC and renamed the Yuma Panthers in February 2012.

== Season-by-season records ==
Arizona Winter League:

Season	W	L	Win %	Place	Playoff
2007	13	8	.619	1st	Won Championship.
2008	8	11	.421	T-4th	Did not qualify.
2009	15	5	.750	1st in American Division	Won Championship.
2010	12	8	.595	1st in American Division	Lost Championship.
2011	11	6	.647	1st in American Division	Won Championship.
2012	N/A	N/A	N/A	N/A	In Progress.

== See also ==
- Yuma Panthers (NAL)
