= Arizona Summer League =

- Sport: Baseball
- Founded: 2009
- Folded: 2013
- No. of teams: 4 (as of 2011)
- Country: USA
- Last champion: San Diego Surf Dawgs (2)
- Website: www.arizonasummerleague.com

The Arizona Summer League (ASL) was a professional short-season instructional baseball league affiliated with the independent North American League (NAL). The league was announced on April 3, 2009, and founded in Yuma, Arizona by the now-defunct Golden Baseball League (now a part of the NAL). Now headquartered in San Ramon, California, it is an independent baseball league that includes of four teams based out of different cities. All games are played at Desert Sun Stadium in Yuma, Arizona. The 2011 season ran from July 13 to August 8.

Since its inception, some players from the ASL have signed contracts with affiliated professional teams. In 2009, 18 ASL players were plucked out of the league by independent and foreign pro leagues. In 2010 57 ASL players (over 90%) were signed to pro contracts by independent and foreign pro leagues.

The league, along with the companion Arizona Winter League, ceased operations for good in 2013.

== League Format ==
Patterned after the Arizona Winter League, the GBL-owned Arizona Summer League debuted with three charter teams: the Canada Miners, San Diego Surf Dawgs, and El Centro Imperials, under GBL team management. The Yuma Scorpions, who play in both the GBL and AWL, and San Luis Atleticos of the AWL were originally named as a charter team in the ASL, but were replaced at the last minute by the Surf Dawgs as the inaugural season began on July 2, 2009. In 2010, the Surf Dawgs were joined by the Bisbee Miners and Long Beach Armada. In 2011, the teams were joined by Team Canada while Bisbee was reidentified as former GBL franchise the Mesa Miners.

The inaugural season consists of a 20-game regular season, with the first and second place teams facing off in a one-game playoff for the championship. All teams are based in the Yuma, Arizona, area playing all games at Desert Sun Stadium (home of the Scorpions) and utilizing the Ray Kroc Complex which used to house the San Diego Padres and Yakult Swallows spring training operations. The league is for players out of college or university who were overlooked by professional teams and other players who were released by pro teams and are looking for professional contracts either from the Golden Baseball League or Major League Baseball. It is an instructional summer league that includes a number of ex-major league stars as managers and instructors such as Mike Marshall, Rusty Meacham, Nick Belmonte, Warren Cromartie, Benny Castillo, Alex Arias and Shannon Hunt. The ASL will also help players who were injured during the season to rehab and work on returning to their GBL team.

== Summer League teams ==
Arizona Summer League
Team	Founded	City	Stadium
Long Beach Armada	2005 (with the Golden Baseball League)	Long Beach, California	Desert Sun Stadium (Yuma)
Mesa Miners	2005 (with the Golden Baseball League)	Mesa, Arizona	Desert Sun Stadium (Yuma)
San Diego Surf Dawgs	2005 (with the Golden Baseball League)	San Diego, California	Desert Sun Stadium (Yuma)
Team Canada	2009 (with the Arizona Winter League)	Canada	Desert Sun Stadium (Yuma)

== Season-by-season standings ==
=== 2009 ===
Final Standings

Team	W	L	Win %	GB
*Canada Miners	9	5	.633	---
El Centro Imperials	7	7	.500	2
San Diego Surf Dawgs	5	9	.357	4

* Awarded championship

=== 2010 ===
Final Standings

Team	W	L	Win %	GB
*San Diego Surf Dawgs	6	3	.650	---
Bisbee Miners	5	4	.550	1
Long Beach Armada	4	8	.333	3.5

* Awarded championship

=== 2011 ===
Final Standings

Team	W	L	Win %	GB
Mesa Miners	8	6	.571	---
Team Canada	8	7	.533	.5
*San Diego Surf Dawgs	7	8	.467	1.5
Long Beach Armada	6	8	.429	2

* Awarded championship after single elimination playoff

== Past Teams ==
- Bisbee Miners (2010).
- Canada Miners (2009).
- Western Canada Miners.
- Blythe Heat (2009).
- El Centro Imperials (2009).
- Long Beach Armada (2011).
- Colorado River Snow Falcons.
- Edmonton Cracker Cats.
- Saskatchewan Silver Sox.
- Salton Sea Silver Sox.

== Possible team(s) ==
The Palm Springs Chill based in Palm Springs, California were interested to join the ASL.

Another Arizona-based team is the Tucson Toros whom postponed their inaugural season in 2010.

== Notable ASL alumni ==
During the 2011 Summer season: 10 Players signed Professional contracts, Shortstop Kirby Young who played in 14 Games Hit. 400 and signed with the Los Angeles Angels of Anaheim becoming the first player to sign with a major league team in 2011.
