= Calexico Outlaws =

Professional independent baseball team

Information
- League: Arizona Winter League (International)
- Location: Calexico, California
- Ballpark: Desert Sun Stadium (Yuma, Arizona)
- Founded: 2012
- Folded: 2013
- Division championships: 0
- Colors: Black, red, white
- Ownership: North American League
- Media: Yuma Sun
- Website: www.arizonawinterleague.com

The Calexico Outlaws were a professional independent baseball team based in Calexico, California, representing that city and Mexico. They played in the developmental Arizona Winter League, a short-season instructional winter league affiliated with the North American League and played in the International Division, as well as the San Diego Surf Dawgs, San Luis Atleticos, Saskatchewan Silver Sox and Team Canada. The team plays their home games in 2012 at Desert Sun Stadium in Yuma, Arizona. Their team colors are black, red and white and they don the uniforms of the now-defunct Chico Outlaws. The team disbanded in 2013.

== Season-by-season records ==
Arizona Winter League:

Season	W	L	Win %	Place	Playoff
2012	N/A	N/A	N/A	N/A	Starting play in 2012.
