= Henderson RoadRunners =

Logo
Cap insignia

Information
- League: North American League (2011–2012) (Western Division)
- Location: Henderson, Nevada
- Ballpark: Morse Stadium (Henderson, Nevada)
- Founded: 2007
- Disbanded: 2011
- League championships: 0
- Division championships: 1 (GBL Southern-1st Half, 2009 in St. George)
- Former name: Henderson RoadRunners (2011); St. George RoadRunners (2007–10)
- Former league: Golden Baseball League (2007–10)
- Former ballpark(s): Bruce Hurst Field (St. George, Utah)
- Colors: Navy blue, burnt orange, white
- Ownership: North American League
- Media: Las Vegas Sun
- Website: www.northamericanleague.com

The Henderson RoadRunners were an independent professional baseball team based out of Henderson, Nevada. They were members of the Western Division in the North American League and were scheduled to begin play in 2011 at Lied Field at Morse Stadium on the campus of the College of Southern Nevada in Henderson. But they would forgo their inaugural season as Lied Field will not be ready in time for the start of the season. The franchise folded in 2012 after failing to attract attention and secure new ownership. They would've been the second professional franchise to play in the Las Vegas area. The first is the Las Vegas 51s of the Triple-A Pacific Coast League.

== Team history ==
=== The St. George era (2007–2010) ===
St. George RoadRunners logo (2007–2010)

The team originally began in 2007 as the St. George RoadRunners of the now-defunct Golden Baseball League, replacing the suspended San Diego Surf Dawgs for the 2007 season. They played their home games for their entire run in Utah at Bruce Hurst Field at Dixie State College in St. George. Former major league right fielder Cory Snyder was named the team's first manager that same year and remained there until 2010. Jerry Turner served as bench coach.

On July 5, 2009, the RoadRunners clinched its first playoff spot in team history by winning the GBL Southern Division 1st Half title after defeating the defending GBL champion Orange County Flyers, 4–2, in Fullerton, California. They hosted the 2009 GBL All-Star Game on July 14 at Bruce Hurst Field.

On December 9, 2009, it was announced that the RoadRunners would fold after three seasons, citing poor attendance as its main factor. Ironically, their now-former owners XnE, Inc., were granted a new expansion franchise, the Maui-based Na Koa Ikaika Maui, just months earlier. Snyder left the RoadRunners to become the new manager in Maui.

The new ownership group was announced on January 20, 2010, as the Hot Corner Group led by principal owner Will Joyce. Rick Berry returned as general manager while maintaining his job as president of Na Koa Ikaika Maui, a team which was later sold to Western Sports & Entertainment Group. They named former Long Beach Armada, Victoria Seals, and Palm Springs Chill manager Darrell Evans as their new team manager after he was fired by the Seals in March 2010.

Unfortunately, poor attendance (along with lack of support from the business community, supposed stadium lease issues and alleged lack of beer sales) was the team's undoing again, and the team was once again on the verge of folding. However, the league took over the franchise from the Hot Corner Group to finish out the 2010 season as a road team. On August 11, the RoadRunners returned to action, versus Victoria and were victorious in a 4–3 win, led by a two hit, run scoring performance by new third baseman Mike Castellano.

=== The Henderson era (2011 and beyond) ===
In January 2011, after the GBL was absorbed into the newly formed North American League, the RoadRunners relocated to Henderson, but their team name was not changed like other franchises have done in the past (i.e. Mesa Miners to Reno Silver Sox to Tucson Toros). They replaced the proposed Tijuana Embajadores team which was scheduled to play in the league for 2011, but was dropped by the league. They postponed their inaugural season as renovations at Lied Field at Morse Stadium were not ready in time for the start of the season. They were set to begin play in 2012, but never did.

=== Arizona Winter League version (2011–?) ===
The team identity also belonged to a developmental franchise in the Arizona Winter League called the Arizona RoadRunners, which was based out of Yuma, Arizona, (home of the NAL's Yuma Panthers and AWL's Yuma Scorpions), and also began play in 2011 just prior to the Henderson team starting in the NAL.

Both teams were league-owned and were looking for new ownership, but after failing to secure new ownership the league folded the franchise.
