= Reno Silver Sox (Golden Baseball League) =

- 2006–2008; Reno, Nevada
Team logo
Cap insignia

Minor league affiliations
- Class: Independent (2006–2008)
- League: Golden Baseball League (2006–2008)

Minor league titles
- League titles (1): 2006
- Division titles: 2005; 2006

Team data
- Name: Reno Silver Sox (2006–2008)
- Colors: Navy, silver, crimson, white
- Ballpark: William Peccole Park (2006–2008)
- Owner/ Operator: Golden Baseball League
- Media: Reno Gazette-Journal
- Website: www.goldenbaseball.com/reno/

The Reno Silver Sox were a professional baseball team based in Reno, Nevada, in the United States. They were a member of the North Division of the independent Golden Baseball League, which is not affiliated with either Major League Baseball or Minor League Baseball. From 2006 to 2008, they played their home games at William Peccole Park, on the campus of the University of Nevada, Reno.

The team was the descendant of the original Reno Silver Sox minor league baseball team that played with three leagues from 1947 to 1992.

== History of the Silver Sox name ==
For obvious reasons, the name Silver Sox is derived from the nickname of Nevada, the "Silver State". Like MLB's Boston Red Sox and Chicago White Sox, the team has a sock as its logo.

=== Sunset League/Far West League (1948–1951) ===
Before they became a part of the GBL, the Silver Sox actually began their legacy as a member of the class-C Sunset League in 1947. They won the league championship in 1948. The team would be downgraded to the Class-D Far West League in 1950 and would play there until 1951 in an overall shoddily run league that would acquire the nickname the Far Worst League before it folded.

=== California League (1955–1992) ===
The second incarnation were a member of the single-A California League starting in 1947 as the Ventura Yankees and remained so until 1949. They changed their names several times starting with the Ventura Braves in 1950–52, the Ventura Oilers in 1953, the Channel Cities Oilers in 1954–55, then moved to Reno during 1955 season becoming the Reno Oilers in 1955 and finally became the Reno Silver Sox during that 1955 season. The team won the CL Championship on four occasions before folding in the 1970s. They won the league championship in 1960, 1961, 1975 and 1976 and were listed #55 among MinorLeagueBaseball.com's 100 Best Minor League Baseball Teams. They were a class-C (equivalent to today's single-A) affiliate of the Brooklyn/Los Angeles Dodgers.

The third version was another California League team that was an affiliate of the San Diego Padres from 1977 to 1987, then was unaffiliated from 1988 to their final season in 1992. They joined the league as the "new" Silver Sox then changed their name to the Reno Padres in 1982, then back to the Silver Sox when they were dropped as Padres affiliate in 1988. The team made the playoffs on two occasions, losing the CL Championship series in 1987.

== Golden Baseball League franchise history ==
=== Beginning, Championship & End ===
The fourth, and current, Silver Sox franchise started as the Mesa Miners in 2005. They played their home games at HoHoKam Park in Mesa, Arizona. They were one of the original eight GBL charter teams along with the Chico Outlaws, Fullerton Flyers, Long Beach Armada and San Diego Surf Dawgs in California; Surprise Fightin' Falcons and Yuma Scorpions in Arizona and the traveling Japan Samurai Bears that began play in May 2005.

In their only year of play in Mesa, the team won the first ever GBL Arizona Division title and played in the Championship Game against the Surf Dawgs. Unfortunately, the Miners had the league's worst overall attendance, and was dropped from the GBL in November 2005. The league also dropped Surprise largely due to not having another team in central Arizona and to give the league an even number of six teams instead of seven. The low attendance numbers both teams received were due largely to the fact that many of their home games were played in the scorching night-time heat of central Arizona.

The GBL has said publicly that they would reconsider the Arizona market (Mesa and Surprise) if the league, the city of Mesa and the concessionaire at HoHoKam Park could agree on a revenue sharing agreement for concessions sales. In 2005 the Miners received none of the sales proceeds from their own games. The Miners were the only team in the league without revenue sharing on concessions.

Much of the Miners' roster and coaching staff were carried over to the league's new Reno Silver Sox team in 2006. Playing at Peccole Park on the University of Nevada campus, the Silver Sox were instrumental in helping the college improve the facility and partnered in adding lights and an artificial all-weather turf field. While much better than the old and run-down Moana Field which housed the former professional Silver Sox, the University stadium still had much to be desired with its inadequate home locker rooms, no visitor locker rooms, and poorly thought out seating design that forced fans to go behind the bleachers to move through the ballpark The Silver Sox opened their inaugural campaign in Reno by winning the 2006 GBL Championship defeating the Fullerton Flyers 3–1 in the championship series. Les Lancaster was named the GBL Manager of the Year for the 2006 season., while the MVP of the team was catcher Marcus Jensen a former major leaguer and member of the 2000 U.S. Olympic Gold medal team. Solid attendance accompanied the championship team with sellout crowds on many occasions, including the series where Jose Canseco came in as a member of Long Beach Armada and appeared at one game and then faked a back injury to skip the next two games so he could stay up all night playing poker at the Grand Sierra Resort. The team sold an independent league record nine players to major league organizations during 2006 and still managed to reload and win the title.

After a disappointing 2007 season when the Sox finished 9 games under .500, Lancaster left the team and would be replaced by former San Francisco Giants star Jeffrey Leonard in 2008. They finished the season with an even more disappointing 30–58 record under Leonard. Midway through the season as it became apparent that the Triple-A Pacific Coast League would be re-locating to Reno, the Silver Sox had diminished fan and sponsor support and even saw some of the front office management start to lobby for and then moonlight with the AAA team.

=== The End of the Reno era ===
With the pending arrival of the Pacific Coast League's Reno Aces, the Silver Sox were forced out and the search began for a new home ballpark and new owners. There were rumors about the team possibly moving south to Carson City, Nevada, but there was no suitable ballpark to host the team or any interested investors who would bring the team there, so as a result, the franchise was sold to Tucson Baseball LLC and renamed the Tucson Toros, who (like the original Reno Silver Sox) were named after a former minor league team. The identity and history of the GBL Silver Sox remain the property of the league for a future expansion franchise.

=== Arizona Winter League version ===
In 2009, the Silver Sox name, uniforms and caps became used by the Arizona Winter League's newest team, the Saskatchewan Silver Sox, who play their home games at Desert Sun Stadium in Yuma, Arizona, the AWL's home base and home stadium of the Yuma Scorpions. Supported by Saskatchewan residents wintering in Arizona, the fans who attended the team's games did catch the attention of GBL commissioner Kevin Outcalt. He said, "The Silver Sox are also a bit of a nod by the Golden League that we'd love to be up in Saskatchewan, too, in Saskatoon or in Regina or Moose Jaw, if we had the right ownership group and ballpark."

== Season-by-season records ==
=== California League ===
see Reno Silver Sox (minor league version)

=== Golden Baseball League ===
Season	W	L	Win %	Place	Playoff
2005 (in Mesa)	51	36	.589	1st, Arizona Division	Won Arizona Division. Lost to San Diego in the Championship Series.
2006	47 (25/22)	33 (15/18)	.588	1st/3rd	Qualified. Defeated Fullerton in the Championship Series.
2007	33 (18/15)	42 (19/23)	.440	5th/6th	Did not qualify
2008	30 (17/13)	58 (27/31)	.341	4th/4th, North Division	Did not qualify

^{1} Season in Progress

== See also ==
- Reno Silver Sox (original minor league team)
- Mesa Miners
- Reno Aces
- Saskatchewan Silver Sox (AWL team)
