= Arizona RoadRunners =

Former Arizona Winter League baseball team

- Logo

Information
- League: Arizona Winter League (2011) (American)
- Location: Yuma, Arizona
- Ballpark: Desert Sun Stadium (Yuma, Arizona)
- Founded: 2011
- League championships: 0
- Division championships: 0
- Former league: Golden Baseball League
- Colors: Navy blue, burnt orange, white
- Ownership: Diamond Sports & Entertainment
- Manager: Benny Castillo
- Website: www.arizonawinterleague.com

The Arizona RoadRunners were a professional baseball team based out of Yuma, Arizona and were a member of the American Division of the Arizona Winter League, a short-season developmental program run by the North American League. They were owned by Diamond Sports & Entertainment and they played games at Desert Sun Stadium in Yuma, Arizona since 2011.

== Team name ==
The team name once belonged to the St. George RoadRunners of the Golden Baseball League (which has since been absorbed into the new North American League). The GBL RoadRunners played for four seasons from 2007 to 2010, before ownership, financial and stadium issues forced the team to fold after the 2010 season. It is now shared with the newest NAL franchise, the Henderson RoadRunners from Henderson, Nevada.

The Arizona RoadRunners were added to the AWL along with the Long Beach Armada and Team Mexico with the Sonora Pilots returning to the league. The AWL consists of some teams formerly identified as GBL franchises. They now play in the American Division along with the Blythe Heat, Long Beach Armada, Somerton Stingers and Yuma Scorpions.

== Season-by-season records ==
Arizona Winter League:

Season	W	L	Win %	Place	Playoff
2011	N/A	N/A	N/A	American Division	To debut in 2011.
