= Team Mexico (Arizona Winter League baseball team) =

Independent baseball team for Mexico in the AWL

Team Mexico
Founded	2011
Ballpark	Desert Sun Stadium
Based in	Yuma, Arizona
Team Colors	Red, White and Green
Division	International
League	Arizona Winter League

Team Mexico is a professional independent baseball team representing Mexico. They play in the developmental Arizona Winter League, a short-season instructional winter league affiliated with the North American League and play in the International Division along with the Saskatchewan Silver Sox, Sonora Pilots, Team Canada and Western Canada Miners as of 2011. The team is owned by Diamond Sports & Entertainment and play their home and away games at Desert Sun Stadium in Yuma.

They replaced the defending AWL champion Calgary Vipers, who would not return for 2011.

== Year-By-Year Records ==
Arizona Winter League:

Season	W	L	Win %	Place	Playoff
2011	N/A	N/A	N/A	International Division	To debut in 2011.
