= Calgary Vipers =

Canadian professional baseball team

Logo
Cap insignia

Information
- League: North American League (Northern Division); Arizona Winter League (Canadian Division)
- Location: Calgary, Alberta
- Ballpark: Foothills Stadium (capacity 6,000)
- Founded: 2005
- Disbanded: 2011
- League championships: 2 (GBL 2009, AWL 2010)
- Division championships: 3 (2007, 2008, 2009)
- Former name: Calgary Vipers (2005–present)
- Former leagues: Northern League (2005–07); Golden Baseball League (2008–10)
- Colours: Black, maroon, silver, white
- Ownership: Jeff Gidney
- Manager: Morgan Burkhart
- Media: Calgary Sun
- Website: www.calgaryvipers.com

The Calgary Vipers were a professional baseball team based in Calgary, Alberta, Canada. They were part of the Western Division of the independent North American League. The Vipers played all of their home games at Foothills Stadium. Previously, the Vipers played in the Northern League from 2005 to 2007. The Vipers were champions of the Golden Baseball League in 2009, having defeated the Tucson Toros in the Championship Series.

Management problems surfaced just prior to the end of the 2011 season. By the end of the 2011 Season, it became apparent that the Vipers were financially moribund, and would not be back for 2012 and that the franchise ceased operations

== History ==
Calgary had been served by the Triple-A Calgary Cannons of the Pacific Coast League (PCL) for 18 years until the team relocated to Albuquerque, New Mexico in 2002. The Calgary Outlaws played half a season in 2003 in the independent Canadian Baseball League before the league folded, leaving the city without professional baseball in 2004. The college level Calgary Dawgs of the Western Major Baseball League also began play in 2003.

The Northern League announced on April 3, 2004, that it was expanding to Alberta, granting new franchises to Edmonton and Calgary. The Calgary franchise was to be owned by a pair of Japanese businessmen, Hiro Masawa and Naoto Higuchi, and incorporated as Calgary Baseball LLC. Due to the distance between the Alberta franchises and the Northern League's base in the midwest United States, the two teams were required to pay a C$60,000 annual travel subsidy to offset the costs for the other teams to fly into the city.

=== Northern League (2004–2007) ===
Calgary Baseball LLC had promised to significantly renovate the aging Foothills Stadium as part of an ambitious plan for the team. However, little movement was seen with the franchise, causing the league to investigate the status of the team in November, 2004. A month later, on December 10, commissioner Mike Stone announced that he had revoked the franchise, stripping Calgary Baseball LLC of its ownership. On February 11, 2005, the league sold the franchise to Winnipeg businessman Jeffrey Gidney. He had less than three months before the start of play to hire staff, sign players and name the team. The team quickly named themselves the Vipers, and began signing players.

Despite the short time frame, the Vipers managed to build a quality team on the field, finishing second in the Northern division in both halves of the season. They played the first game in franchise history, on the road against the Sioux City Explorers on May 20, 2005, losing 7–3. They won their first game the following night, defeating the Explorers 12–2. The team played its first game at home on May 27, defeating the Joliet Jackhammers 9–8 in 11 innings.

Off the field, the Vipers finished last in attendance, averaging just over 1100 fans. However, crowds slowly improved as the season went on and the Vipers grew from a bare bones operation, and as the weather improved following a month of June that featured record amounts of rainfall.

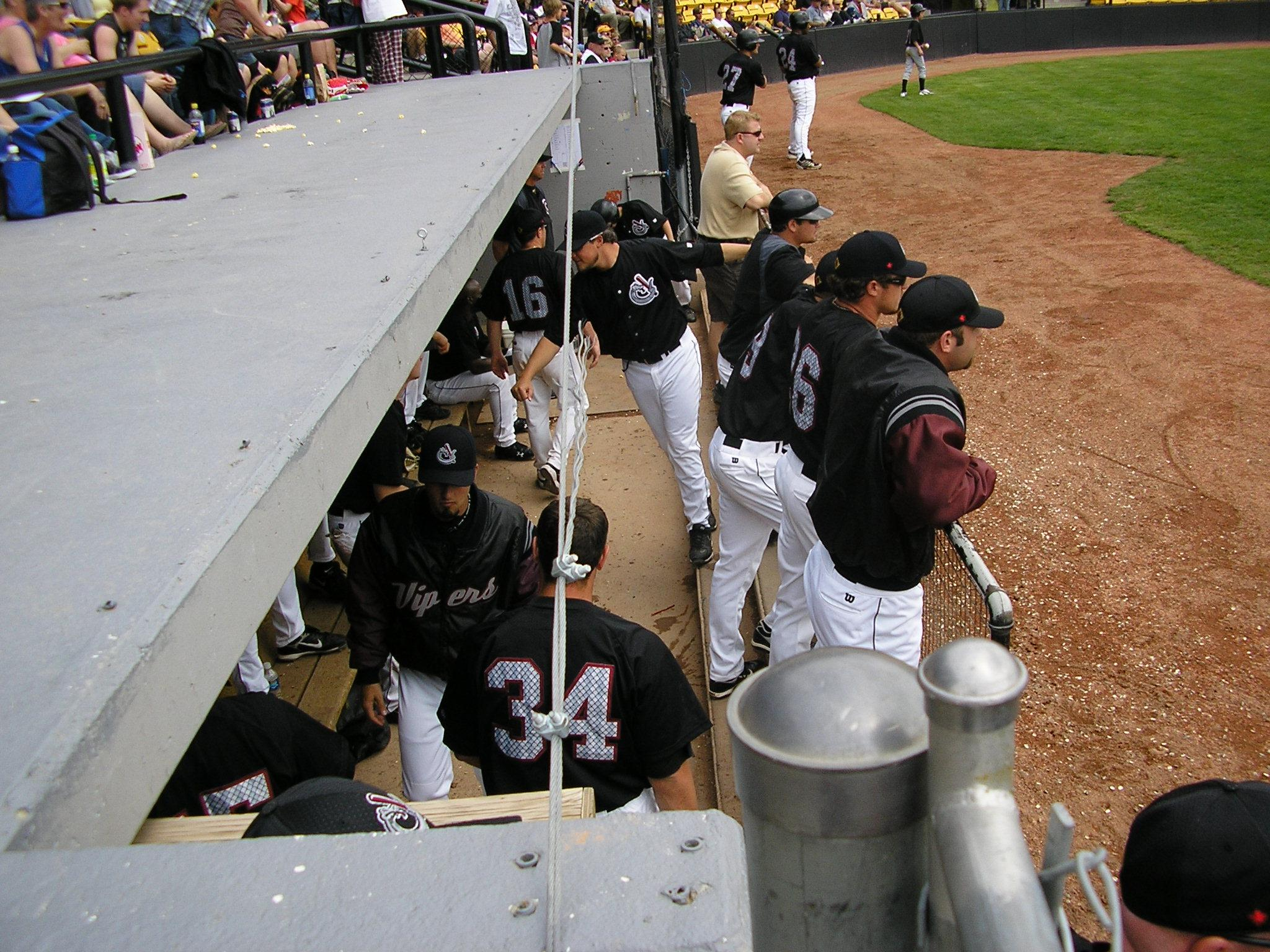
Calgary Vipers players in the dugout

On June 13, 2006, a string of bean balls in the first two innings touched off two major brawls between the Vipers and their provincial rivals, the Edmonton Cracker-Cats. After Edmonton's Greg Morrison was hit by a Calgary pitch for the fourth time in five games, the Cracker-Cats responded by throwing at two Calgary players. The resulting melee was so violent that the umpires sent both teams off the field, and suspended the game for over an hour to consult with league officials. When the Cracker-Cats refused to return to the field afterward, the game was declared a forfeit and the Vipers were awarded a 9–0 victory.

The league came down hard on both teams, as both managers and seven players were suspended a total of 79 games. Morrison blamed Calgary manager Mike Busch for the incident, believing that Busch continues to hold a grudge after both Morrison, and another former Viper, J.P. Fauske defected to the Cracker-Cats after leaving the Vipers after a falling out with the Calgary manager late in the 2005 season.

The Vipers finished first in their division in the first half of 2007 with a record of 29–19, and qualified for the playoffs for the first time. During the season, outfielder Darryl Brinkley became the first minor league baseball player of the modern era to achieve a .400 batting average. Brinkley was named the Independent League Player of the Year by Baseball America.

In the playoffs, they faced the second half winning Fargo-Moorhead RedHawks in the North Division championship. The Vipers defeated the RedHawks 9–4 in the first game of the series to win their playoff debut, en route to a three-game sweep of Fargo as they won the pennant and earned a berth in the Northern League Championship Series. The Vipers won the first game of the final series against the Gary SouthShore RailCats, 7–6, on a two-run, walk-off home run by Carlos Duncan. The teams traded wins in the first four games, forcing the series to a decisive fifth game. The RailCats won the game, and the championship, 5–1.

==== Leaving the Northern League ====
The playoff run would prove to be the team's last hurrah in the Northern League, as both the Vipers and Edmonton Cracker Cats announced that they were leaving the league after declining to post $1 million performance bonds as asked for by the Northern League. Both teams jumped to the California based Golden Baseball League.

=== Golden Baseball League (2008–2010) ===
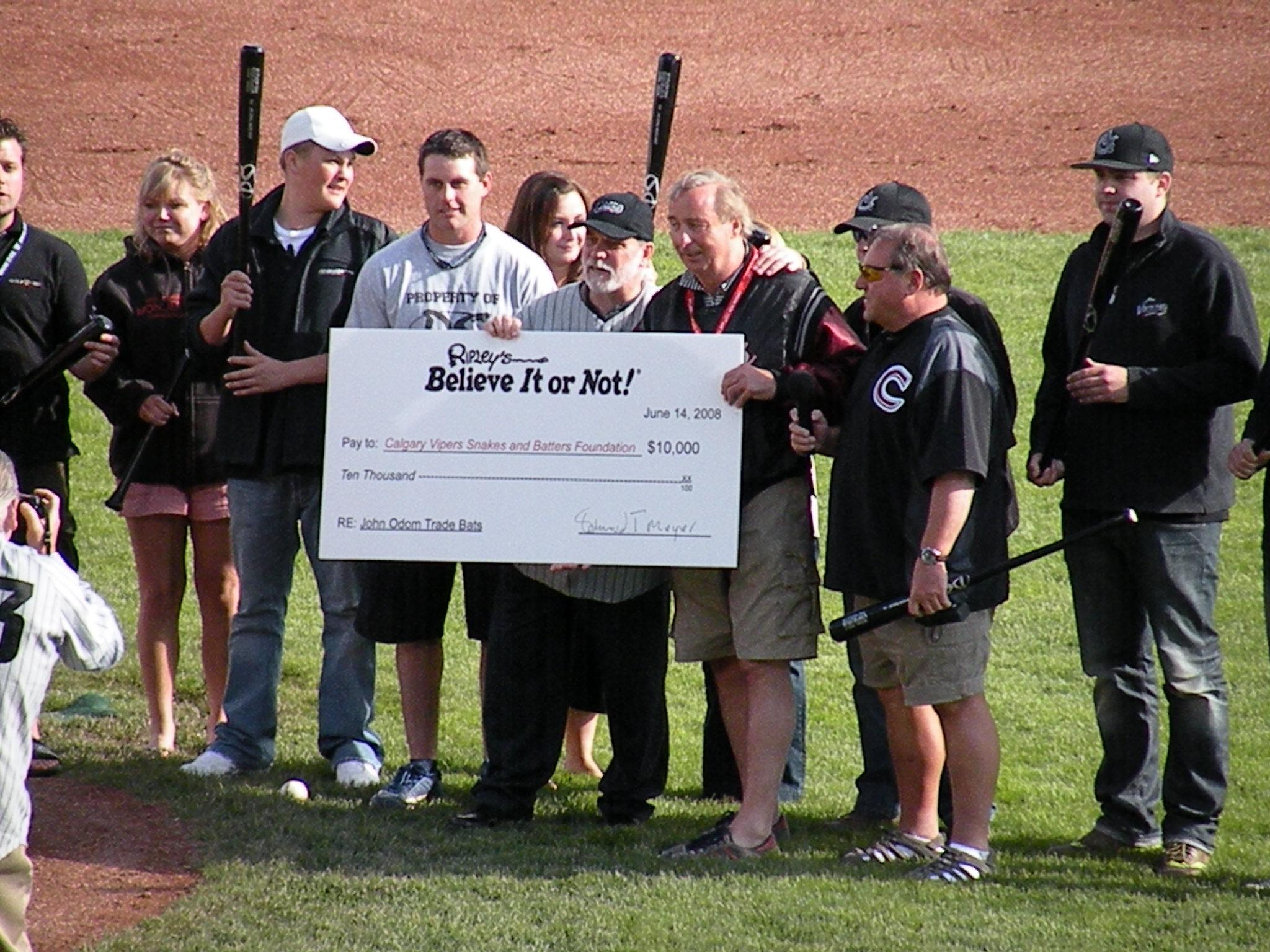
Ripley's purchasing ten baseball bats acquired in the John Odom trade

The Vipers have been making headlines since moving to the GBL. They suggested that former National Hockey League star Theoren Fleury was considering playing for the Vipers. The former Calgary Flame took batting practice with the team, and threw out the first pitch at their home opener. He hit a single in his first at-bat. The next play he charged hard for second but was forced out.

Then, the Vipers traded pitcher John Odom to the Laredo Broncos of the United Baseball League for ten bats. Odom was unable to enter Canada and was turned away at the Canadian border due to an unspecified criminal charge on his record. The Vipers intended to auction the bats off to raise funds for their Snakes and Batters charity fund, however they were instead sold to Ripley's Believe it or Not for $10,000.

On September 5, 2008, the Vipers won the GBL North Division Championship outright by sweeping the Cracker-Cats 3 games to 0. On September 14, they lost the best-of-five GBL Championship Series to the Orange County Flyers 3 games to 2.

In the 2009 season, the Vipers won both halves of the season, qualifying for the playoffs as the North Division regular season champions along with the second-place Edmonton Capitals. In the playoffs the Vipers won their first round series against the Capitals to win their second straight GBL North Division championship. The Vipers set a franchise attendance record in game four, with 4859 fans at the game.

==== 2009 GBL Championship ====
On September 12, 2009, the Vipers finally won their first professional baseball championship by defeating the Tucson Toros 3 games to 1 to capture the GBL Championship in front of over 2,000 fans at Foothills Stadium. They eliminated the Edmonton Capitals by the same 3 games to 1 in the North Division Championship to get back to the finals. It was the second straight year Calgary defeated a rival team from Edmonton. It is the first pro baseball championship for the city of Calgary ever (the Calgary Cannons of the Triple-A Pacific Coast League lost the title twice in the early 1990s), the first time a Canadian team has captured the title and the first time ever for an original privately owned franchise to do so. (The Orange County Flyers, who won the title the previous year, were originally a league-owned team before they were sold to their current private ownership.)

The Vipers won the championship on their third straight try after losing the Northern League title in 2007 and the GBL title in 2008.

=== Arizona Winter League version (2010) ===
In October 2009, it was announced that the Vipers have launched a new instructional version of their team to begin play in the Arizona Winter League in 2010, replacing the departed Palm Springs Chill, who formed their own instructional league. They will play in the new Canadian division along with the Saskatchewan Silver Sox, Team Canada and Western Canada Miners. They will be managed in the AWL by former Montreal Expo legend Boots Day, who also serves as bench coach for the parent GBL team.

The Vipers defeated the San Luis Atleticos, 8–1, in the AWL Championship Game shortened to eight innings due to rain. They became the first team in history to capture both the GBL and AWL titles since the GBL's and AWL's respective inceptions. More impressive is that it was done within one calendar year. They would not return to the AWL in 2011.

=== North American League (2011) ===
The Vipers were one of six former GBL teams to join the newly formed North American League in 2010 and began play in 2011. The team ceased operation following 2011 season.

== Year-by-year record ==
			First Half		Second Half		Overall
Season	League	Division	W-L	Finish	W-L	Finish	W-L	Win%	Playoffs
2005	NL	North	25–22	2nd	26–22	2nd	51–44	.537	Did not qualify
2006	NL	North	19–29	4th	23–25	3rd	42–54	.438	Did not qualify
2007	NL	North	29–19	1st	21–27	3rd	50–45	.526	Won North Division pennant (3–0 FM); Lost championship series (2–3 Gary)
2008	GBL	North	26–18	1st	19–24	2nd	45–42	.517	Won North Division pennant (3–0 Edm); Lost championship series (2–3 OC)
2009	GBL	North	26–13	1st	23–14	1st	49–27	.645	Won North Division pennant (3–1 Edm); Won Championship (3–1 Tuc)
2010	GBL	North	23-20	3rd	30–15	1st	53–35	.602	Lost North Division Playoff (0-3 Chico)
2011	NAL	North	53–33	2nd	N/A	N/A	53–33	.616	Lost North Division Playoff (2-4 Edmonton)

== See also ==
- List of baseball teams in Canada
