= Bisbee Miners =

Former Arizona Summer League baseball team from Bisbee, Arizona

- Logo

Information
- League: Arizona Summer League
- Location: Yuma, Arizona
- Ballpark: Desert Sun Stadium (Yuma, Arizona)
- Founded: 2010
- Disbanded: 2011
- League championships: 0
- Division championships: 1 (2009 as Canada Miners)
- Colors: Black, columbia blue, white, gold
- Ownership: Diamond Sports & Entertainment
- Website: arizonasummerleague.com

The Bisbee Miners were a season-season independent professional baseball team that played in the Arizona Summer League representing Bisbee, Arizona. They play their home games at Desert Sun Stadium in Yuma, Arizona, home of the North American League's Yuma Scorpions. They were one of two teams that replaced the 2009 league champion Canada Miners for the 2010 season. The team folded in 2011 as they were returned to their former Golden Baseball League identity of the Mesa Miners.

Arizona Summer League (2010):

Season	W	L	Win %	Place	Playoff
2010	5	4	.550	2nd	No playoffs.
