= Saskatchewan Silver Sox =

Baseball team

Information
- League: Arizona Winter League (International)
- Location: Saskatchewan
- Ballpark: Desert Sun Stadium (Yuma, Arizona)
- Founded: 2009
- League championships: None
- Division championships: 2009 (playoff appearance)
- Colors: Navy Blue, Silver, White, Crimson Red
- Ownership: Diamond Sports & Entertainment
- Media: Yuma Sun, The Regina Leader-Post, The Saskatoon StarPhoenix
- Website: www.arizonawinterleague.com

The Saskatchewan Silver Sox are an independent professional baseball team based in the Canadian province of Saskatchewan. They play in the developmental Arizona Winter League, a short-season instructional winter league affiliated with the North American League and compete in the International Division, as well as the Calexico Outlaws, San Diego Surf Dawgs, San Luis Atleticos and Team Canada. They began playing their home games in 2009 at Desert Sun Stadium in Yuma. (The Blythe Heat, El Centro Imperials and San Luis Atleticos played home games on their own fields until 2011.) They are owned by Diamond Sports & Entertainment.

== Team name ==
The Silver Sox brand belonged to the since-defunct Golden Baseball League Reno franchise and Reno's minor league team before them. The franchise began in the GBL as the Mesa Miners in 2005 and played one season at HoHoKam Park before relocating to Reno and becoming the new Silver Sox one year later. They played their home games at William Peccole Park at the University of Nevada at Reno and won the GBL Championship in their first season there in 2006, but suffered for their last two seasons in Western Nevada. Following the relocation of the AAA Pacific Coast League franchise the Reno Aces from Tucson, Arizona, in 2009, the team was purchased by Tucson Baseball owner Jay Zucker, relocated to Tucson and renamed the Tucson Toros. The Silver Sox team name (owned by the league) has since been given to the current Saskatchewan team in the AWL, which has no ties to the original Reno franchise, yet could adopt the team history.

== Team name origin ==
Unlike its GBL predecessor and name sake, the Silver Sox team name is based on the importance of the precious metal in Saskatchewan where significant silver ore deposits lie in the Canadian Shield in the eastern part of the province near Flin Flon, Manitoba. It is also a not too subtle hint that the summer professional Golden Baseball League, which already has teams in Victoria, Calgary, and Edmonton; would be very open to a new ownership group that would like to add an expansion team in Saskatoon or Regina for the 2010 season.

== Attendance and possible relocation ==
Supported by throngs of Saskatchewan residents wintering in Arizona, the Silver Sox roster is reflective of the diversity of the province with players from Canada, Korea, Japan, the U.S. and Latin America and is striving to bring a professional baseball championship back to Saskatchewan. The Silver Sox lead the average attendance in 2009 with approximately 1,200.

Though nothing has been etched in stone, there has been talk between the GBL and a potential investor about bringing a franchise (possibly the Silver Sox) to play at Cairns Field in Saskatoon. The dedicated fan base did catch the attention of Golden Baseball League commissioner Kevin Outcalt. He said in an interview, "The Silver Sox are also a bit of a nod by the Golden League that we'd love to be up in Saskatchewan, too, in Saskatoon or in Regina or Moose Jaw, if we had the right ownership group and ballpark."

== Season-by-season records ==
Arizona Winter League:

Season	W	L	Win %	Place	Playoff
2009	10	10	.500	2nd, International Division	Lost to San Luis in playoffs.

== See also ==
- List of baseball teams in Canada

== Articles ==
- Sunshine boys eye Saskatoon, Kevin Mitchell, The StarPhoenix, October 27, 2007
- Saskatchewan's Silver Sox wrap up season, Ron Petrie, The Regina Leader-Post, March 2, 2009
- Can the Silver Sox find a new home in Saskatchewan?, Mike Summers, Southern Oregon Timberjacks GBL website, May 21, 2009
