= Chico Outlaws =

Defunct American baseball team

Logo
Cap insignia

Information
- League: North American League (Northern Division)
- Location: Chico, California
- Ballpark: Nettleton Stadium
- Founded: 2005
- Disbanded: 2011
- League championships: 2 (2007, 2010)
- Division championships: 2 (GBL: 1st half-2007, Northern 1st Half-2010)
- Former name: Chico Outlaws (2005–12, folded)
- Former league: Golden Baseball League (2005–10)
- Colors: Black, red, white, silver
- Media: Chico Enterprise Record, KCKS 101.7 FM, KEWE 1340 AM
- Website: www.chicooutlaws.com

The Chico Outlaws were a professional baseball team based in Chico, California, in the United States. The Outlaws were a member of the Northern Division of the independent North American League, which is not affiliated with either Major League Baseball or Minor League Baseball. From the 2005 season to the 2011 season, the Outlaws played their home games at Nettleton Stadium, on the campus of Chico State University. The team officially folded on February 29, 2012, and some of its remnants (including management and on-field staff) have gone to the NAL's newest team, the San Rafael Pacifics.

The rights to the Outlaws were owned by Diamond Sports & Entertainment (DSE). DSE Board Chairman was Timothy Draper and CEO was Brian MacInnes. Those rights are now up in the air.

== History ==
=== Golden Baseball League (2005-2010) ===
The Outlaws began play in May 2005, three years after their predecessors, the Chico Heat were forced to cease operations due to the folding of the Western Baseball League and not being able to find a new league to join. After the formation of the Golden Baseball League in 2004, Chico was granted one of the eight original charter teams in the league along with the Fullerton Flyers, Long Beach Armada and San Diego Surf Dawgs in California; Mesa Miners, Surprise Fightin' Falcons and Yuma Scorpions in Arizona and a traveling team the Japan Samurai Bears. The Outlaws, Flyers and Scorpions are the remaining charter teams still active in the league today. Chico, Long Beach and Yuma were former WBL cities. Former Heat minority owner and Western League president Bob Linscheid was the team's first president and general manager. He served those positions from 2004 to 2008. The Outlaws played in the GBL's Western Division.

They opened their inaugural season on May 27, 2005, against the Flyers at Nettleton Stadium, bringing professional baseball back to Chico for the first time since the Chico Heat's 2002 championship campaign with the Western League. They won that inaugural ball game 9-4. Their first manager was former Major League Baseball catcher Mark Parent, a native of Cottonwood, California. Linscheid was named the league's first-ever "Executive of the Year".

Continuing the winning tradition in Chico, the Outlaws made the playoffs the first year but lost in the early rounds. In 2006 they were on the verge of winning the second half that would have put them in the Championship Series versus the Fullerton Flyers, but in an epic collapse they lost a 6 game lead with 10 games to play as they were beaten in 7 of their last 8 games by the Reno Silver Sox. The Silver Sox went on to win the 2006 GBL Championship defeating the Flyers 3 games to 1. It would take three years, but the Outlaws made it to their first GBL Championship Series in 2007 and beat the Long Beach Armada in four games, 3-1, to bring Chico their first professional championship since 2002. After winning the championship, Parent stepped down as manager and handed the reins over to former Heat player and Outlaws coach Jon Macalutas. The Outlaws lead the average attendance in the league with over 2,000 fans in 2008. On November 12, 2008, Macalutas realized that the job was not a good fit for him and resigned as manager of the Outlaws after his team went 34-51. In 2009, the Outlaws named former major league pitcher Greg Cadaret their manager but he failed to last the season and was fired midway through for his inability to be successful with his players on and off the field. Hitting coach Kory DeHaan took over and the team responded well with a much better record under DeHaan and improved 10 games over their dismal 2008 season. DeHaan was asked to return in 2010, but the San Diego Padres took note of his managing success in Chico and offered him a coaching job in their organization in his hometown of Phoenix.

On January 13, 2010, the Outlaws officially named former Major Leaguer and former Flyers and Armada manager Garry Templeton as their new manager. He led the team to their best ever record as the squad won the South Division First Half title with a mark of 33-12. They went on to sweep defending Champion Calgary in the first round of the playoffs. They signed 18-year-old female Japanese knuckleball pitcher Eri Yoshida, the first woman to play pro baseball in Japan, on April 9, 2010, to play the 2010 season. She is the first female pro baseball player in the United States in ten years. On June 24, the National Baseball Hall of Fame and Museum was on-hand and after Yoshida's start presented her with a plaque and collected her jersey and bat for inclusion in Cooperstown.

=== North American League (2011) ===
The Outlaws were one of six former GBL teams to join the newly formed North American League in 2010 and played in 2011. In February 2012, the team folded. (See below)

== Key Outlaws moments ==
=== 2007 brawl ===
On July 4, 2007, the Outlaws and Reno Silver Sox were involved in a huge brawl that would be considered one of the most talked about events in GBL history. After Outlaws pitcher Nick Singleton gave up a Juan Sanreso 2-run home run, he plunked the next Sox batter and words were exchanged. Next, Outlaws batter Ricky Bambino was struck by Sox pitcher Dusty Bergman in apparent retaliation. More words were then exchanged, Bambino charged the mound, and the brawl was on. After about a one-minute fight, order was restored. Bambino, Bergman and Silver Sox manager Les Lancaster were all ejected for the altercation. The Outlaws would win the game 6-4.

=== Management changes ===
On August 27, 2008, Bob Linscheid announced that he was stepping down as president and chairman of the board of the Outlaws to pursue other interests. He will remain a priority shareholder for the league. Curt Jacey took over operations following the end of the 2008 season while remaining as the team's now-full-time general manager, having left his GM post with the Reno Silver Sox.

On August 30, 2008, Linscheid was honored in a post-game ceremony for his hard work in helping to bring professional baseball to Chico in 1996 and for the many years afterward. The jersey #1 (which has never been worn by a player from either the Chico Heat or Chico Outlaws) was retired at Nettleton Stadium in his honor.

Linscheid says the league is looking to expand and they plan on using the Outlaws as a model franchise.

=== Record-breaking attendance ===
Though the Outlaws have averaged around 2,500 to 3,000 fans in attendance over their five-year existence, they made history by setting a new all-time attendance record at Nettleton Stadium against the Edmonton Capitals on July 3, 2009, when 5,037 fans packed the ballpark, including 400 seated inside along both the first base and third base lines next the dugouts. This shatters previous records held by the Chico Heat and the Outlaws. The Outlaws won the game, 8-5.

=== Daniel Nava ===
Chico Outfielder Daniel Nava was the 2007 GBL Most Valuable Player and had his contract purchased by the Boston Red Sox. On June 12, 2010 against the Philadelphia Phillies he was the first Chico Outlaw to make it to the Major Leagues and responded by becoming only the fourth player in major league history in hit a grand slam in his first at bat as he went deep to centerfield on the first pitch thrown to him.

=== Outlaws acquired by major-league teams ===
- RHP Grant Gregg, Cubs (2005)
- LHP Alex Perez, Cubs (2005)
- 3b/C Craig Kuzmic, Blue Jays (2006)
- OF Daniel Nava, Red Sox (2007)
- OF Steve Boggs, White Sox (2007)
- RHP Chris Malone, Rockies (2008)
- RHP Jesse Oster, Phillies (2008)
- LHP Derrick Loop, Red Sox (2008)
- OF Lino Garcia, Rockies (2008)
- INF/OF Todd Gossage, White Sox (2009)
- OF Steve Boggs, Royals (2009)
- LHP Donald Brandt, Brewers (2009)

=== Female pitcher ===
On June 1, 2010, Eri Yoshida, a 5 foot, 1 inch female knuckleball pitcher from Japan, pitched for the Outlaws.

=== GBL's first two-time champions ===
The Outlaws made history and defied the odds to sweep the Calgary Vipers to win the GBL North Division Title, then sweep Na Koa Ikaika Maui to capture their second GBL Championship in 2010, becoming the first team in league history to accomplish that feat, as well as going undefeated in the playoffs.

=== Kaval leaves Outlaws and GBL for MLS ===
David Kaval, co-founder and C.E.O. of the GBL since its inception in 2005, resigned to take the job as team president of the San Jose Earthquakes of Major League Soccer. Kaval will remain on board as chairman of the GBL Board of Directors. Team president Mike Marshall indicated that the team will return for the 2011 season.

=== Arizona Winter League version ===
The Outlaws identity was given to a new expansion team in the Arizona Winter League, the Calexico Outlaws. The team currently plays in the International Division.

== Season-by-season records ==
Season	W	L	Win %	Place	Playoff
2005	49	41	.544	2nd, California Division	Wild Card, Eliminated in playoffs
2006	46	34	.575	2nd/2nd	Did not qualify
2007	44 (25/19)	32 (13/19)	.579	1st/3rd	Qualified. Defeated Long Beach in the Championship Series.
2008	34 (15/19)	51 (26/25)	.400	4th/3rd, North Division	Did not qualify
2009	33 (20/13)	44 (23/21)	.429	3rd/3rd, North Division	Did not qualify
2010	55 (33/22)	30 (12/18)	.647	1st/2nd, North Division	Qualified. Defeated Maui in the Championship Series.

=== Retired numbers ===
Chico Outlaws retired numbers
No.	Player
1	Bob Linscheid *(team president)

*The #1 jersey was never worn by any player from either the Chico Heat or Chico Outlaws.

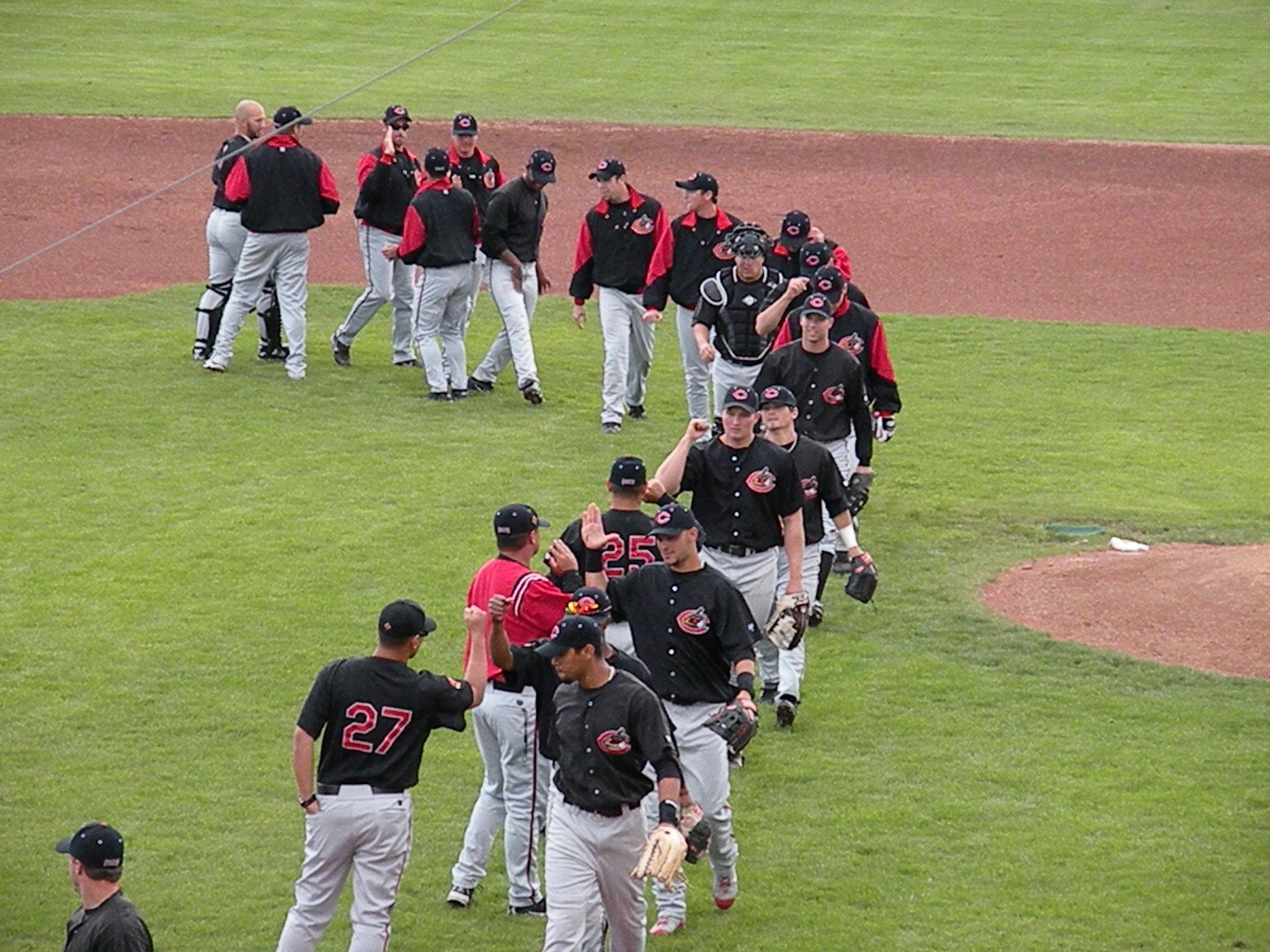
The Outlaws celebrate a victory over the Calgary Vipers.

== Outlaws Broadcasting ==
All Outlaws games were originally heard on NewsTalk 1290 KPAY and ESPN Radio 101.7 FM/1340 AM from 2005 to 2008 with Rory Miller on the call. Due to declining advertising interest in radio, the games were made available live on the internet at the team's website.

Broadcasts of the Outlaws games were moved from the radio to the internet full-time courtesy of VistaNet in 2009, with Joe Rauschenberger announced as the new play-by-play commentator. He was later replaced by Scott Navarro and Levi Funderburk close to the end of the season.

On March 26, 2010, Dan Hawkins was named as the "Voice of the Outlaws" and called Outlaws baseball live on the internet for that season.

For the 2011 season, Marshall Kelner, a graduate of the University of Southern California, was named broadcaster and brought play by play action online at ChicoOutlaws.com

== Female Public Address Announcer ==
The Chico Outlaws have one of the few female public address announcers in professional baseball, Shelly Rogers; 2011 was her fourth season with the Outlaws and second full-time.

== The demise of the Outlaws ==
As of October 6, 2011, Outlaws VP/GM Mike Marshall told the local Chico newspaper he was laid off and the office closed. Meanwhile, the team, which is owned by the North America League, has no lease next season for Nettleton Stadium—and with no one working in the closed office, there are no sales efforts underway for 2012.

On December 16 & 17, 2011, the Chico Enterprise-Record reported that the Outlaws will sit out the 2012 season as they regroup. But it is unclear if the franchise will ever return to Chico.

On January 9, 2012, the Chico Enterprise-Record reported the Chico Outlaws are discussing contract options for leasing Nettleton Stadium from CSU Chico for the upcoming 2012 season.

On February 29, 2012, Outlaws CEO Brian MacInnes announced that the team would not play in Chico, or "anywhere else", in 2012... thus, ending the franchise's run in town.

== The future of professional baseball in Chico ==
Though, there have been rumors of possible returns of professional franchises to Chico, there has been nothing concrete set of as yet.
