= Team Canada (baseball) =

Arizona Winter/Summer League team

Team Canada
| Founded | 2009 |
| Ballpark | Desert Sun Stadium |
| Based in | Yuma, Arizona |
| Team Colors | Red and White |
| Division | International (AWL) |
| League | Arizona Winter League; Arizona Summer League |

Team Canada is a professional independent baseball team representing Canada. They play in the developmental Arizona Winter League and Arizona Summer League, short-season instructional leagues affiliated with the North American League. The team is owned by Diamond Sports & Entertainment and have played their home and away games since 2009 at Desert Sun Stadium in Yuma. They replaced the Sonora Pilots, who did not play in 2009 or 2010, yet the Pilots returned in 2011.

== Arizona Winter League ==
Team Canada has played in the AWL's International Division along with the Saskatchewan Silver Sox, Sonora Pilots, Team Mexico and Western Canada Miners as of 2011.

=== Year-by-year records ===
Arizona Winter League:

| Season | W | L | Win % | Place | Playoff |
|---|---|---|---|---|---|
| 2009 | 8 | 12 | .400 | 3rd, International Division | Did not qualify. |
| 2010 | 7 | 13 | .350 | 5th, Canadian Division | Did not qualify. |
| 2011 | N/A | N/A | N/A | N/A | Did not qualify. (No records available.) |

== Arizona Summer League ==
Team Canada was added to the newly expanded four-team ASL along with the Long Beach Armada, Mesa Miners and San Diego Surf Dawgs in 2011. Their first game is set for July 13, 2011 against Long Beach.

=== Year-by-year records ===
Arizona Summer League:

| Season | W | L | Win % | Place | Playoff |
|---|---|---|---|---|---|
| 2011 | 0 | 0 | .000 | N/A | Starts play July 13, 2011. |
