= San Luis Atleticos =

Pro baseball team based in San Luis, Arizona

Information
- League: Arizona Winter League (International)
- Location: San Luis, Arizona
- Ballpark: Joe Orduno Field (San Luis, Arizona); Desert Sun Stadium (Yuma, Arizona)
- Founded: 2009
- League championships: 1 (2012)
- Division championships: 1 (AWL International Division, 2009)
- Colors: Green, gold, white
- Ownership: Golden Baseball League
- Manager: Eddie Dennis
- Media: Yuma Sun
- Website: www.arizonawinterleague.com

The San Luis Atleticos are a professional independent baseball team based in San Luis, Arizona, representing that city and Mexico. They play in the developmental Arizona Winter League, a short-season instructional winter league affiliated with the Golden Baseball League and play in the International Division, as well as the Saskatchewan Silver Sox, Team Canada and Western Canada Miners. The team will play their home games in 2009 at Joe Orduno Field in San Luis. Their team colors are green and gold, similar to the Oakland Athletics of Major League Baseball. They are managed by former Toronto Blue Jays farmhand Eddie Dennis, who now manages the United League's Rio Grande Valley WhiteWings team.

On April 3, 2009, the Atleticos were originally announced as a charter team of the new Arizona Summer League, a short-season instructional summer league also affiliated with the GBL. However, they were replaced by the San Diego Surf Dawgs.

In 2012, the Atleticos returned to the field and won the 2012 AWL Championship.

== Season-By-Season Records ==
Arizona Winter League:

Season	W	L	Win %	Place	Playoff
2009	14	6	.700	1st, International Division	Lost to Yuma in Championship Game.
