= Lake County Fielders =

- 2010–2011; Zion, Illinois
Team logo
Cap insignia

Minor league affiliations
- Class: Independent (2010–2011)
- League: North American League (2011); Northern League (2010)

Minor league titles
- League titles (0): None

Team data
- Name: Lake County Fielders (2010–2011)
- Colors: Navy, burgundy, white, copper, gray
- Ballpark: Carthage Baseball Field (2010); Fielders Stadium (2010–2011)
- Owner(s)/ Operator(s): Grand Slam Sports & Entertainment, LLC (Richard Ehrenreich, managing partner)

The Lake County Fielders were an American professional minor league baseball team based in Zion, Illinois, located in Lake County in the northern reaches of the Chicago area. The Fielders were owned by Grand Slam Sports & Entertainment, LLC, based in Deerfield. The primary owner was Richard Ehrenreich. Actor Kevin Costner, whose filmography includes baseball films Bull Durham (1988), Field of Dreams (1989), and For Love of the Game (1999), also had ownership interest in the team. A permanent stadium was never constructed.

The Fielders were a member of the Northern League in 2010 and joined the North American League in 2011 as part of the Northern Division. The team announced on April 10, 2012, that they would not be fielding a team for the 2012 baseball season.

== Ballpark (temporary) ==
The Fielders began play in 2010 at Carthage College because of funding problems with Zion Ballpark. The Fielders played their first game in Zion on July 2, 2010, at a young Fielders Stadium that didn't include much more than a field and bleachers. Lights were added to the field, and the Fielders played their first night game on Monday, July, 26.

After the conclusion of the 2010 season, the temporary ballpark was completely dismantled and construction on a new, permanent stadium was supposed to begin. The park was not ready in time for the beginning of the 2011 season, and, as a result, the Fielders started the season with a 32-game road trip. Temporary stadium construction was again completed in time for the Fielders' home opener on July 3, 2011.

== Founding ==
The team held a name-the-team contest to decide the nickname. The five finalists were Cowpokes, Luckies, Fielders, Comets, and Skippers. The Fielders name, logo, and colors were unveiled on May 27, 2009, at the Key Lime Cove indoor waterpark in nearby Gurnee, also home to Gurnee Mills and Six Flags Great America.

== Media ==
Fielder games were broadcast live on WKRS-AM (1220) and wkrs.com with Qumar Zaman (who quit on air over financial disputes) and Les Grobstein (some games) on the play-by-play. The team got so transient that the new announcers could not refer to the players by name on many occasions.

== Awards ==
=== Northern League (2010) ===
- Joshua Short - 2010 Rookie of the Year
- Joshua Short - 2010 End of Year All-Star Team (DH)

=== North American League (2011) ===
- C.J. Ziegler (also with Calgary Vipers) - 2011 End of Year All-Star Team (1B)
- Travis Weaver (also with Lincoln Saltdogs (AA)) - Baseball America Top 10 Independent League Prospect

== All-Stars ==
=== Northern League (2010) ===
- Amos Ramon 3B
- Joshua Short LF

=== North American League (2011) ===
2011 (No All-Star Game)

== Former Major Leaguers ==
- Jason Pearson (2010)

== Contracts purchased by MLB ==
- Zach Ward (Cincinnati Reds) (2010)
- Vince Bongiovanni (Toronto Blue Jays) (2011) (after trade to Lincoln Saltdogs)

== Managers ==
- Fran Riordan (41-59 .410 Pct.) (2010)
- Tim "TJ" Johnson (27-35 .435 Pct.) (2011)
- Pete LaCock (0-1 .000 Pct.) (Interim) (2011)
- Chris Thompson (0-1 .000 Pct.) (Interim) (2011)
- Chris Arago (3-20 .130 Pct.) (2011)

== Season finishes ==
=== Northern League (2010) ===
- 2010 - (41–59) tied for 7th place with Schaumburg Flyers (also owned by Rich Ehrenreich)

=== North American League (North Division) (2011) ===
- 2011 - (27–36) 4th place (Pct.), 5th place (Wins) (did not finish official regular season)
