= Fielders Stadium =

Baseball park in Zion, Illinois, United States

- Location within Illinois Location within the United States
- Interactive map of Fielders Stadium
- Location: Route 173 & Green Bay Road; Zion, IL 60099
- Coordinates: 42.46587°N 87.87961°W
- Owner: Kevin Costner
- Capacity: 7,000 for baseball and 12,500 for concerts
- Surface: Natural grass & plush felt

Construction
- Groundbreaking: November 6, 2009
- Built: June 29, 2010
- Opened: July 2, 2010
- Architect: Panattoni Development Company

Tenant
- Lake County Fielders (2010–2011)

Fielders Stadium is an unfinished baseball park in Zion, Illinois. It was nicknamed "A Diamond on the Border" and "Lake County's Field of Dreams." It was the designated home of the Lake County Fielders (2009-2012) of the North American League. The ballpark was to be located on the corner of 9th Street and Green Bay Road in the Trumpet Park business park in Zion. After the Fielders baseball team folded in August 2011, they did not have a 2012 season and the stadium was never completed.

== Funding problems ==
Before the property for the stadium had been secured, an official groundbreaking ceremony was held on November 5, 2009, at a warehouse adjacent to the ballpark's planned site. In February 2010, with construction pending the completed purchase of the land, the Fielders announced that they would downsize plans for the stadium in order to complete the park in time for its June 11 opening day. When the city of Zion proved unable to secure funding for the property purchase, it announced in April 2010 that the stadium site was to be moved several blocks south to a new location at the corner of Illinois State 173 and Green Bay Road. For the 2010 season, Zion and the Fielders built a temporary facility resembling a "county fair" setting, while construction continued during the season. Temporary bleachers and party decks were to be erected around the field.

== 2010 season ==
The Fielders opened the 2010 season at Carthage College, across the border in Kenosha, Wisconsin, because of Zion Ballpark's finance problems. The Fielders eventually moved back to Zion on July 2, playing at a field that was not developed with much more than bleachers. On Monday, July 26, the Fielders played their first night game in Zion, as lights had been installed.

In 2011 the team played another season. The most notable game was on July 9, 2011, with the Fielders vs. the Yuma Scorpions, managed by player/coach Jose Canseco. Before the game in Zion, Fielders manager Tim Johnson resigned because of the lack of moneys, and the lies and broken promises made by ownership to him and the team. Pitching coach Pete LaCock was promoted to manager.

LaCock and the Fielders team decided to rebel against the ownership: they changed the position players to pitching, and pitchers were assigned to play the field. When Scorpions manager Jose Canseco heard what the Fielders were doing, he decided the Scorpions would also put pitchers in the field, and fielders into pitch.

The Fielders team folded that year because of financial problems. No ballpark was completed in Lake County.

== Details ==
The state-of-the-art ballpark was to have a capacity of 7,000 spectators. It also was to have box seats, pub-style seats, and general lawn seating. The stadium was to feature five luxury suites and a year-round restaurant and banquet hall. The park also planned to feature a Kids Zone, party decks, and a concert stage. The new ballpark at the second site was to have many of the same features, as well as a movie theater and "ballpark village" setting around the stadium.
