= Garry Templeton =

American baseball player and manager (born 1956)

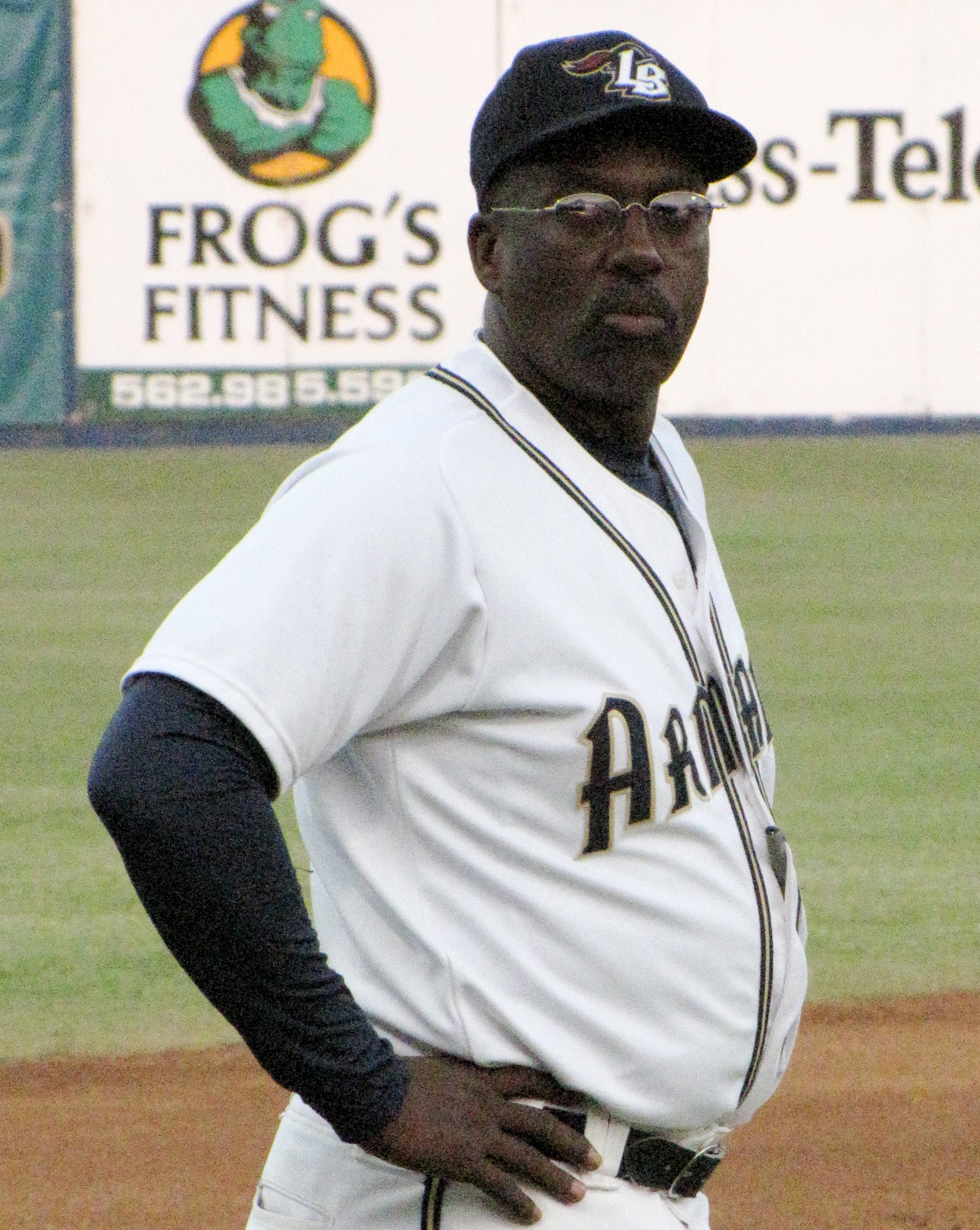
- Templeton with the Long Beach Armada in 2009
- Shortstop
- Born: March 24, 1956 (age 70); Lockney, Texas, U.S.
- Batted: Switch Threw: Right

MLB debut
- August 9, 1976, for the St. Louis Cardinals

Last MLB appearance
- October 5, 1991, for the New York Mets

MLB statistics
- Batting average: .271
- Hits: 2,096
- Home runs: 70
- Runs batted in: 728
- Stats at Baseball Reference

Teams
- St. Louis Cardinals (1976–1981); San Diego Padres (1982–1991); New York Mets (1991)

Career highlights and awards
- 3× All-Star (1977, 1979, 1985); 2× Silver Slugger Award (1980, 1984); San Diego Padres Hall of Fame

Garry Lewis Templeton (born March 24, 1956) is an American former professional baseball player and minor league manager. He was a shortstop in Major League Baseball for the St. Louis Cardinals, San Diego Padres and New York Mets from 1976 to 1991. He was inducted into the Padres Hall of Fame. He managed in the minor and independent leagues from 1998 to 2013.

== Playing career ==
Born in Lockney, Texas, Templeton was hailed by many as one of the best players in baseball early in his career with St. Louis, which featured All-Star selections in 1977 and 1979. In 1979, he made history as the first switch-hitter to collect 100 hits from each side of the plate, a feat achieved only once more by Willie Wilson in 1980. His total of 211 hits led the National League and with 19 triples, he led the league for a third consecutive season. He led the Cardinals in hits in 1977, 1978, and 1979. He caused some controversy in 1979 when, despite having better numbers than either Dave Concepción or Larry Bowa, two of the National League's premier shortstops at the time, he wasn't selected to start at shortstop for the National League All-Star team. He was named to the team as a reserve but refused to go.

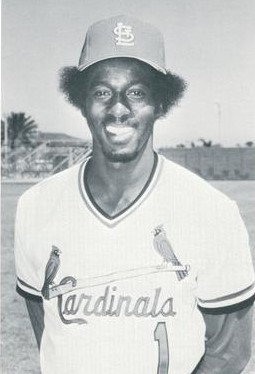
Templeton with the St. Louis Cardinals in 1980

The quote, "If I ain't startin', I ain't departin'" regarding the 1979 MLB All-Star Game is often mistakenly attributed to Templeton over his refusal to play. In reality, Jack Buck, Cardinals sportscaster at the time made the statement.

He continued to hit well in 1980 and 1981, but he was not popular with Cardinals fans, who felt he had an uninterested style of play in his body language. He was also charged with a large number of errors in the field, averaging 35 per year between 1977 and 1979. The fielding issues led to a dispute with management, who in 1979 offered a pay cut: Templeton felt his fielding was underrated since his wide range led to being charged with more errors, while his ability at the plate and on the basepaths remained strong. He publicly demanded, "pay me or trade me", even saying he wouldn't give his all if forced to remain in St. Louis. The next day he backed off and issued an apology.

Things deteriorated badly between the team and Templeton during the 1981 season. On one play when Templeton didn’t run to first on a dropped third strike, he was booed and heckled by the crowd and responded with a rude gesture then got into a shoving match with his manager, Whitey Herzog, when he returned to the dugout. Later that year, Templeton was briefly hospitalized with depression.

1985 postcard of Templeton for San Diego Padres

After the 1981 season, the Cardinals traded him to the Padres for Ozzie Smith. The trade was welcomed by people on both sides: Smith was (then) a light-hitting defensive wizard going to a team which needed to improve its defense (and he was also embroiled in a contract dispute with Padres' management), while Templeton was a better hitter going to a team which needed to improve its offense. The trade was not finalized for nearly two months until February 1982 as Ozzie Smith's agent demanded a huge raise in order for his client to waive his no-trade clause and leave southern California, where Ozzie had grown up.

The trade ended up being a clear win for the Cardinals as Ozzie Smith went on to be elected to the Baseball Hall of Fame. Oddly, Smith's hitting improved significantly with the Cardinals while he retained - or improved on - his defensive brilliance, while Templeton's defense improved in San Diego but his offense slipped considerably.

On the other hand, Templeton played 1,286 games for the Padres in ten seasons with the team. He collected 1,135 hits, 43 home runs, 427 RBIs and a .252 batting average with one Silver Slugger Award win and one All-Star Game appearance in 1985. In 1984, he was a key part of the team that won their first ever National League West title and NL pennant. During pregame ceremonies of the 1984 National League Championship Series in Game 3, the normally reserved Templeton encouraged the crowd by waving his cap. With plays from him, the Padres won Game 3 and then won Games 4 and 5 to complete the comeback. He was named team captain of the Padres by manager Larry Bowa in 1987 and held the role for four years. In 1991, his final major league season, he played 32 games for the Padres before being traded to the New York Mets on May 31 for Tim Teufel. Templeton played in 80 more games for the Mets for a total of 112 that year. He hit for .221 with three home runs and 26 RBIs in the season.

Templeton was inducted into the San Diego Padres Hall of Fame on August 8, 2015.

== Managing career ==
After his retirement as a player in 1991, Templeton remained in the game as a coach and minor league manager. From 1998 through 2001, he managed in the Anaheim Angels organization for four teams, posting a 294–272 record. From 2003 to 2004, he managed the Gary Railcats of the Northern League, moving on to manage the Golden Baseball League's Fullerton Flyers in 2005. After three years with the Flyers, he would move on to manage the Arizona Winter League's Palm Springs Chill in 2008, then would return to the GBL to manage the Long Beach Armada in 2009. He managed the Chico Outlaws to the GBL Championship in 2010. On January 8, 2013, Templeton was named manager of the Newark Bears of the independent Can-Am League. He stopped managing after that season.

== Personal life ==
Templeton's son, Garry Templeton II, played minor league baseball from 1999–2007. He managed the Hawaii Stars in 2012 and the Vallejo Admirals from 2014–15, winning the Pacific Association of Professional Baseball Clubs Manager of the Year Award in 2014. He then became a scout for the Arizona Diamondbacks for eight years. He then returned to coaching, for the independent Idaho Falls Chukars.

== See also ==
- List of Major League Baseball career hits leaders
- List of Major League Baseball career triples leaders
- List of Major League Baseball career stolen bases leaders
- List of Major League Baseball annual triples leaders

Preceded by Joe Calfapietra	Manager of the Gary SouthShore RailCats; 2003 – 2004	Succeeded by Greg Tagert
