= Benny Castillo =

Baseball player and manager (born 1966)

Benny Castillo (born July 15, 1966 in Santo Domingo, Dominican Republic) is a former professional baseball player and manager.

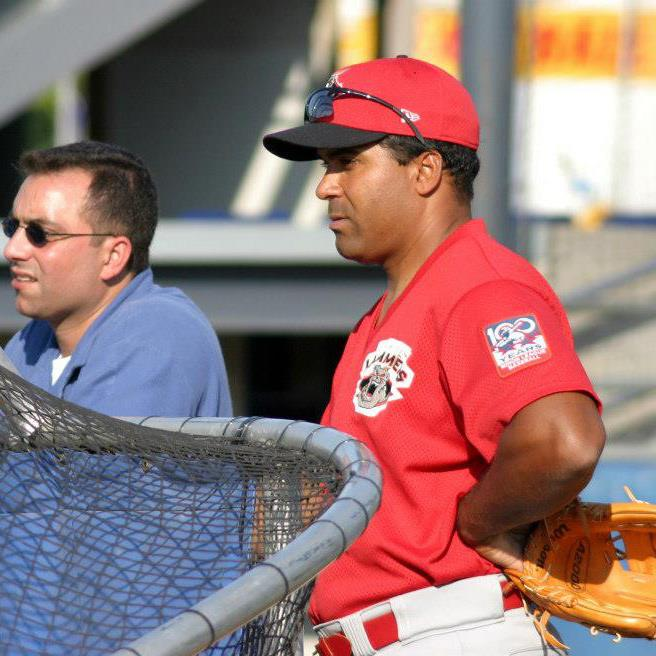
Farm Director (Mark Delpiano) & Field Manager (Benny Castillo) observing batting practice session 2003 in Jamestown, New York (Marlins Affiliate)

== Early life ==
Raised in the Bronx, New York, Castillo attended Park West High School, where he was coached by the late Mr. Paul Gordon, who was a mentor & father figure to both Castillo & future MLB player Devon White. Castillo played American Legion Baseball with the Youth Service League Program (1981–1990) out of the Parade Grounds in Brooklyn run by Mel Zitter.

== Playing career ==
=== College ===
As a freshman undergraduate student, Castillo attended and played at Central State University in Ohio. As a sophomore, Castillo transferred to The Community College of Baltimore, where he was drafted in the 4th round of the 1986 MLB draft by the Cleveland Indians. Castillo opted to pass on an opportunity to play professional baseball and instead enrolled in college at Oklahoma State University (OSU) where he was coached by the legendary Hall of Fame coach Gary Ward. While Castillo was a junior in 1987, OSU reached the championship game in the College World Series against Stanford University, losing 9–5 to future MLB pitcher Jack McDowell.

=== Minor leagues ===
Castillo was drafted again in the 1988 Major League Baseball draft by the Detroit Tigers organization, beginning his career there that season. A well-traveled player, he played for such teams as the Appalachian League's Bristol Tigers (1988), the South Atlantic League's Fayetteville Generals (1988–89), the Pioneer League's Salt Lake City Trappers (1991), the Florida State League's Charlotte Rangers (1992), the Texas League's Tulsa Drillers (1993), The Saint Paul Saints of the Northern League (1994 & 1998) and the Eastern League's Canton–Akron Indians (1995).

== Managerial career ==
Castillo began his managerial career with the Duluth–Superior Dukes in the Northern League in 2000, where he took the team from the league's worst record in 1999 to the Central Division Championship. For that feat he was named Independent Baseball Manager of the Year by Baseball America. He would later manage the Sioux City Explorers (2001–02), the Florida Marlins short-season Jamestown Jammers (2003–04), the Golden Baseball League's Yuma Scorpions (2005–06), the Arizona Winter League's Sonora Pilots and the Detroit Tigers’ rookie team in the Gulf Coast League (2007).

In his time as a manager with both the Marlins and Tigers, he also served as their respective Extended Spring Training Coordinator where he was in charge of working with both drafted players and international players. In 2003 as a member of the Player Development staff of the Florida Marlins, he was granted a championship ring after the Marlins defeated the New York Yankees in the World Series.

== Personal life ==
Castillo earned a Bachelor's degree in Social Work from Augustana College and a Master's degree in Education from the University of Sioux Falls.
