= Keegan Field =

Baseball field in Yuma, Arizona, US

- Interactive map of Keegan Field
- Location: 23rd Street and Kennedy Lane; Yuma, AZ 85365
- Coordinates: 32°41′12″N 114°36′40″W
- Owner: City of Yuma
- Operator: City of Yuma
- Surface: Grass
- Field size: Left Field – ft Left-Center – ft Center Field – ft Right-Center – ft Right Field – 370 ft.

Tenant
- San Diego Padres (NL) (Spring training) (1969)

Keegan Field is an amateur sports field located in Yuma, Arizona, United States. The 4‐acre athletic facility contains a softball field with lights for night games and is part of the larger 32-acre Kennedy Park Athletic Complex. It was named in honor of Frances Keegan, a local supporter of amateur athletics.

Keegan Field was the first spring training home of the San Diego Padres in 1969 prior to their move in 1970 to Desert Sun Stadium.

== 1969 San Diego Padres ==
The Baltimore Orioles had trained in Yuma and played spring training games at Yuma's Municipal Stadium in 1954 before returning to Florida in 1955.

Yuma's Chamber of Commerce had sought a major league team since the Orioles' departure. San Diego was awarded a major league baseball franchise on May 27, 1968, and set about finding a spring training home. The Chamber's chair was newspaper publisher Don Soldwedel who was friendly with the Padres' president Buzzie Bavasi from Bavasi's time with the Dodgers. Yuma was a three-hour drive from San Diego and the local community was eager to welcome them. The Padres signed a five-year contract with Yuma and the city agreed to construct a multi-field baseball facility by spring 1970 which would be Desert Sun Stadium.

For spring training 1969, the City of Yuma renovated and improved Keegan Field, adding bleachers, fences, dugouts, locker rooms, batting cages, concession stands, a press box, and PA system. An ad hoc group Community Baseball Boosters assisted Caballeros de Yuma, a civic organization, with fundraising. The groups raised $3,000 from a raffle, $3,000 from a barbecue, and another $3,000 from bumper stickers. During Spring Training in 1969, the Padres’ clubhouse was behind the centerfield scoreboard with showers located outside at the nearby Kennedy Swimming Pool. Visiting team facilities were a mile away at Municipal Stadium.

The Padres opened spring training on February 22, 1969, and played an inter-squad game on February 28, 1969, which it opened for free to the Yuma community. The Padres played their Yuma home opener on March 7, 1969, against the California Angels in front of 2,500 fans. The Padres drew 1,837 spectators on March 20, 1969, for their 8–5 loss to the San Francisco Giants with Hall of Famers Willie Mays, Willie McCovey, and Juan Marichal. The Padres played their final game at Keegan Field on April 3, 1969, when they defeated the Oakland Athletics in front of 1,120 spectators.

The Padres moved to Dessert Sun Stadium in 1970 and Keegan Field returned to its use for amateur sports.

The field on which the Padres played continues to be used as a community baseball field.
