= Sonora Pilots =

Pro baseball team in Yuma, Arizona

- Logo

Information
- League: Arizona Winter League (2006–2008, 2011) (International)
- Location: Yuma, Arizona
- Ballpark: Desert Sun Stadium (Yuma, Arizona)
- Founded: 2006
- League championships: 0
- Division championships: 0
- Former name: Sonora Pilots (2007–present); Snow Falcons (2006)
- Colors: Blue, White, Red and Grey
- Ownership: Arizona Winter League
- Website: www.arizonawinterleague.com

The Sonora Pilots were a professional independent baseball team based in Yuma, Arizona and represented Sonora, Mexico. They played in the International Division of the developmental Arizona Winter League, a short-season instructional winter league sanctioned by the North American League and they played their home games at Desert Sun Stadium in Yuma, along with the Canada Miners, San Diego Surf Dawgs and Yuma Scorpions. They were not affiliated with Major League Baseball or Minor League Baseball.

== Team history ==
The team started as the Snow Falcons and they used the logo and uniforms of the inactive Surprise Fightin' Falcons team of the now-defunct Golden Baseball League. They were initially managed by Benny Castillo during their original 2-year AWL run. The team did not return after two seasons in November 2008 and were replaced by Team Canada.

On July 10, 2009, they were announced as set to play in 2010 in the Arizona Winter League, again playing at Desert Sun Stadium. However, an October 23, 2009, update does not have them coming back to the AWL after all. They could be invited to play in another league in the future. On January 5, 2011, they were announced to be returning to play in the International Division for the 2011 season.

== Season-by-season records ==
Arizona Winter League:

Season	W	L	Win %	Place	Playoff
2007	6	15	.286	4th	Did not qualify.
2008	5	14	.263	6th	Did not qualify.

== See also ==
- Surprise Fightin' Falcons
