= San Diego Surf Dawgs =

Former independent pro baseball team

Logo
Cap insignia

Information
- League: Federal Baseball League
- Location: San Diego, California
- Founded: 2005
- Folded: 2011 (reforming for 2023)
- League championships: 1 (GBL, 2005; ASL, 2010)
- Division championships: 1 (GBL California, 2005)
- Former name: San Diego Surf Dawgs (2005–06, 2008–present); Sonora Surf Dawgs (2007, AWL)
- Former league: Golden Baseball League 2005–06
- Colors: Columbia blue, navy blue, gold, white
- Media: The San Diego Union-Tribune, Yuma Sun

The San Diego Surf Dawgs are a professional baseball team based in San Diego, California, that competes in the Federal Baseball League. The team played for two seasons in San Ramon, California, in the Golden Baseball League (GBL), and then in the Arizona Winter League and Arizona Summer League.

The Surf Dawgs were owned by Diamond Sports & Entertainment, previous owners of the GBL and primary investors in the North American League. In November 2022, it was announced the Surf Dawgs franchise would be revived, as part of a west coast expansion of the Federal Baseball League.

Their home stadiums included Tony Gwynn Stadium on the campus of San Diego State University and Desert Sun Stadium in Yuma, Arizona. The team was the inaugural GBL Champions in 2005, managed by former Tucson Padres manager Terry Kennedy. They won the 2010 ASL Championship.

== Team history ==
=== Golden Baseball League (2005–2006) ===
The Surf Dawgs were one of the eight original GBL charter teams that began play in 2005 along with the Chico Outlaws, Fullerton Flyers and Long Beach Armada in California; Mesa Miners, Surprise Fightin' Falcons and Yuma Scorpions in Arizona and the traveling Japan Samurai Bears. They were known for playing in the same city as a Major League Baseball team, the National League's San Diego Padres.

The signing of Rickey Henderson gave the team national exposure. Former first-round draft pick Matt Wheatland was among five San Diegans on the roster.

The 2005 team won the first ever GBL California Division title, and on Labor Day weekend 2005 they won the inaugural GBL Championship tournament, coming back on the last day to win two games.

The team again made news in June 2006 by signing former Major League player José Canseco. He made his debut on July 3, 2006 and struck out 4 times. Prior to the game, the Juiced author looked like the Bash Brother of old during batting practice, knocking multiple pitches out of the park. After playing in one game with the Surf Dawgs, Canseco requested to be traded to a team closer to his home in Los Angeles and was sent to the Long Beach Armada.

=== Arizona Winter League (2007–present) ===
The team joined the Arizona Winter League as the Sonora Surf Dawgs in January 2007, but reverted to San Diego for the 2008 season. During the AWL regular season, they are managed by Cory Snyder, who also manages the GBL's St. George RoadRunners. In 2008, they were placed in the new American Division for the 2009 season along with the Blythe Heat, Palm Springs Chill and Yuma Scorpions.

The Surf Dawgs participated in a Lucha & Baseball exhibition game on June 25, 2009, along with some professional wrestlers against the Tucson Toros, which they won 8-3.

=== Arizona Summer League (2009–2011) ===
The Surf Dawgs became a charter team of the new Arizona Summer League in June 2009. They played alongside the El Centro Imperials and Canada Miners in 2009 and then the Long Beach Armada and Bisbee Miners in 2010. They replaced the San Luis Atleticos and Yuma Scorpions, who were originally scheduled to play in the league, but were dropped prior to the start of the inaugural season. They began play on July 2. The Surf Dawgs, instead of the Scorpions, have become the first team to have played in all three leagues within the GBL system. They were awarded the ASL Championship in 2010 and 2011.

=== Possible GBL return ===
The GBL has mentioned the possibility of the Surf Dawgs return to the league for 2010. The team still does not have a suitable ballpark to play on, but the league website is saying that it should change by 2010. The team's official website was temporarily shut down in late June 2009, possibly for revamping as the team is expected to return according to the league. But the website returned in August.

=== Federal Baseball League and Return ===
In 2022, the Federal Baseball League announced a west coast expansion with a division of six tentative host cities: Fresno, Riverside, San Diego, Sonoma, Fullerton, and Stockton. In November 2022, it was announced the Surf Dawgs franchise will be revived for the FBL, with venue and ownership yet to be announced.

== Season-by-season records ==
Golden Baseball League:

Season	W	L	Win %	Place	Playoff
2005	52	38	N/A	1st, California Division	Won California Division; Defeated Mesa in the Championship Series.
2006	35 (16/19)	45 (24/21)	N/A	4th	Did not qualify.

Arizona Winter League:

Season	W	L	Win %	Place	Playoff
2007 (as Sonora)	10	11	.476	3rd	Did not qualify.
2008	10	9	.526	3rd	Lost to Canada in Playoffs.
2009	7	13	.350	4th, American Division	Did not qualify.

Arizona Summer League:

Season	W	L	Win %	Place	Playoff
2009	5	9	.357	3rd	No playoffs.
2010	6	3	.650	1st	Awarded Championship.
