= Mesa Miners =

Baseball team

Logo
Cap insignia

Information
- League: Arizona Summer League
- Location: Mesa, Arizona
- Ballpark: Desert Sun Stadium (Yuma, Arizona)
- Founded: 2005
- League championships: 0
- Division championships: 1 (2005, Arizona Division)
- Former name: Tucson Toros (2009–2010); Reno Silver Sox (2006–08); Mesa Miners (GBL: 2005, ASL: 2011)
- Former league: Golden Baseball League (2005)
- Former ballpark: HoHoKam Park
- Colors: Black, columbia blue, white, gold
- Ownership: Diamond Sports & Entertainment
- Media: Yuma Sun
- Website: www.arizonasummerleague.com

The Mesa Miners were an independent professional baseball team based in Mesa, Arizona. They began as a member of the Arizona Division of the now-defunct Golden Baseball League in 2005. The original team became known as the Reno Silver Sox in 2006, and then the Tucson Toros in 2009, but the league could bring the Miners back as an expansion team should they decide to do so.

They returned to play in 2011 after a six-year absence as a member of the Arizona Summer League, one of two instructional leagues affiliated with the North American League, which was not affiliated with either Major League Baseball or Minor League Baseball.

== History ==
The Miners started as one of eight charter teams in the GBL along with the Chico Outlaws, Fullerton Flyers, Long Beach Armada and San Diego Surf Dawgs in California, the Surprise Fightin' Falcons and Yuma Scorpions in Arizona and a traveling team, the Japan Samurai Bears that began play in May 2005. All teams were league-owned and the team names and logos also belonged to the league. In their one year of play, the team won the first ever GBL Arizona Division title and played in the Championship Game against the Surf Dawgs.

Unfortunately, the Miners had the league's worst overall attendance, (which is somewhat dubious because of the highly inflated attendance numbers that the Fightin' Falcons allegedly received) and was dropped from the Golden Baseball League in November 2005. The league dropped Surprise largely due to not having another team in central Arizona and to give the league an even number of six teams instead of seven. The low attendance numbers both teams received were due largely to the fact that many of their home games were played in the scorching afternoon heat of central Arizona. The Miners roster and coaching staff were carried over to the league's new Reno Silver Sox team, which won the League Championship in 2006. The franchise has since been purchased and relocated to Tucson, Arizona, and has been renamed the Tucson Toros.

== Media ==
The Mesa Miners broadcast all games on the internet, with Darrell Linderman and John Potter providing play-by-play and color commentary. The duo had previously worked together at Cerritos College in Norwalk, California. Toward the end of the 2005 season, select games were also heard on Independent 1310 KXAM radio in Mesa, with Mike Haley doing play-by-play and Linderman and Potter alternating with color commentary (while the other did play-by-play on the internet broadcast).

== Rebirth? ==
The GBL has said publicly that they would reconsider the Arizona market (Mesa and Surprise) if the league, the city of Mesa and the concessionaire at HoHoKam Park could agree on a revenue sharing agreement for concessions sales. In 2005 the Miners received none of the sales proceeds from their own games. The Miners were the only team in the league without revenue sharing on concessions. HoHoKam Park has played host to the Arizona Fall League's Mesa Solar Sox since 1992.

Should the Miners return to Mesa, they would be an expansion team since the original team was absorbed by the Silver Sox. The Miners name, logo and uniforms (owned by the league) have been used by the Western Canada Miners of the Arizona Winter League, the NAL's instructional league started by the GBL in 2007.

If the brand does not return to Mesa, some suggest that the new expansion franchise which adopts the "Miners" identity should be placed in possibly Canada because of the history of mining in the western part of the country. Other suggest California for the obvious state nickname of the "Golden State".

=== Arizona Summer League ===
After one season representing Bisbee, Arizona, the Miners' representation was returned to Mesa as the team returned to play as the newest member of the Arizona Summer League in July 2011. They joined fellow former Golden Baseball League teams the Long Beach Armada and San Diego Surf Dawgs in the league as well as Arizona Winter League's Team Canada.

== Team record ==
Season	W	L	Win %	Place	Playoff
2005	51	36	.589	1st, Arizona Division	Won Arizona Division. Lost to San Diego in the Championship Series.

== See also ==
- Reno Silver Sox
- Tucson Toros
- Canada Miners
