= Blythe Heat =

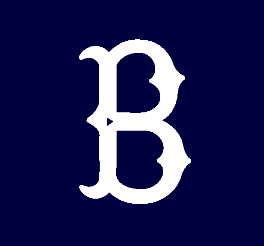
- Cap insignia

Information
- League: Arizona Winter League (American)
- Location: Blythe, California
- Ballpark: Alexander Field
- Founded: 2008; 18 years ago
- Folded: 2011; 15 years ago
- League championships: 1 (2008)
- Division championships: N/A
- Colors: Navy Blue, Silver, White, Crimson Red
- Ownership: Diamond Sports & Entertainment
- Media: Palo Verde-Quartzsite Times, The Yuma Sun
- Website: www.arizonawinterleague.com

The Blythe Heat were a professional baseball team based in Blythe, California. They played in the Arizona Winter League, a short-season instructional winter league affiliated with the North American League. They began play in 2007 and played their home games at Alexander Field in Blythe. They are the only team in the instructional league that play their home games somewhere other than the league's home base of Yuma, Arizona's Desert Sun Stadium. They were owned by Diamond Sports & Entertainment. The team's uniform logo was that of the former Western Baseball League team, the Chico Heat, predecessors to the GBL's Chico Outlaws.

They won the AWL Championship in their first season in March 2008. They defeated the Canada Miners 10–5 in the Championship Game. The franchise folded in 2011 after the NAL folded.

== Season-by-season records ==
Arizona Winter League:

Season	W	L	Win %	Place	Playoff
2008	8	11	.421	T-4th	Qualified. Defeated Canada in the Championship Game.
2009	8	12	.400	3rd, American Division	Did not qualify.
