= Arizona Winter League =

Short-season independent winter professional baseball league

- Sport: Baseball
- Founded: 2007
- Folded: 2018
- No. of teams: 6
- Country: United States
- Last champion: Team Canada

The Arizona Winter League (AWL) was an independent professional winter baseball league. Arizona Winter League games were all played at Desert Sun Stadium in Yuma, Arizona. The league was founded in 2007. It disbanded in 2013 due to parent league, the Golden Baseball League/North American League, folding, but was restarted in 2016, only to fold again following the 2018 season.

== League format ==
The inaugural season consisted of a 21-game regular season, with the first and second-place teams facing off in a one-game playoff for the championship. All teams are based in the Yuma, Arizona area playing all games at Desert Sun Stadium and utilizing the Ray Kroc Complex which used to house the San Diego Padres and Yakult Swallows spring training operations. The league is a professional winter league that includes a number of ex-major league stars as managers and instructors including Mike Marshall, Garry Templeton, Ozzie Virgil Jr., Les Lancaster, Darrell Evans, and Cory Snyder, most of whom manage independent league teams in the North American, American Association, and Frontier Leagues or are coaches in the minor league system for big league clubs.

In the first five years, over 225 players have left the AWL with professional contracts. Two pitchers from the 2007 Arizona Winter League, Scott Richmond and Sergio Romo have reached the major leagues pitching for the Toronto Blue Jays and San Francisco Giants respectively in 2008.

=== 2007: Debut season ===
Announced on November 15, 2006, and headquartered in Yuma, Arizona by the Golden Baseball League, it is an independent baseball league which consists of ten teams based out of the San Diego Padres former spring training complex in Yuma.

The Arizona Winter League debuted January 19, 2007, with four charter teams: the Canada Miners, Yuma Scorpions, Snow Falcons, and Sonora Surf Dawgs, under GBL team management. These respective teams began using the logos, caps and uniforms of past GBL teams such as the San Diego Surf Dawgs (Sonora), Mesa Miners (Canada) and the Surprise Fightin' Falcons (Snow) with the lone exception of the Scorpions, whose identity is the same as their GBL brethren.

The league was a surprising source of players for the GBL and major league organizations in its first season as 37 players were signed by independent pro teams and the Baltimore Orioles, Kansas City Royals, Philadelphia Phillies, and Boston Red Sox also signed players out of the AWL as well.

=== 2008 Season ===
For the 2008 season, the league added two expansion teams, the Blythe Heat and Palm Springs Chill, the Sonora Surf Dawgs reverted to the previously known San Diego Surf Dawgs and the Snow Falcons were renamed the Sonora Pilots. The Heat and Chill play their home games at respective California ballparks. In addition, the league expanded beyond its affiliation with the Golden Baseball League and had Can-Am League, Frontier League, Northern League, and American Association teams represented in the instructor ranks and eligible to draft players at the end of the AWL. Over 40 players were drafted and signed by independent, foreign professional, and major league organizations.

=== 2009 Season: Format Change ===
For the 2009 season, the league expanded once again and added two more teams, the San Luis Atleticos and the Saskatchewan Silver Sox. In addition, the Sonora Pilots did not return in 2009 and were replaced by Team Canada. The 2009 AWL started a new format with two divisions: The International Division had Team Canada, Western Canada, Saskatchewan, and San Luis, while the American Division comprised Palm Springs, San Diego, Blythe (defending champions), and Yuma. The 20-game season finished up on February 27 and then had a single-elimination semi-final between the top two teams from each Division. A championship game the next night, which is the winter highlight event in Yuma each year and heavily attended, pitted the semi-final winners in a winner-take-all game. A record 47 players were drafted and signed out of the 2009 AWL.

=== 2010 Season: Record Player Signings and MLB Teams Take Notice ===
For the 2010 season, eight teams return once again to the AWL. With the Golden Baseball League's Calgary Vipers replacing the Palm Springs Chill, who were dropped. The league will now feature an American Division consisting of the Yuma Scorpions, Blythe Heat, San Luis Atleticos, and San Diego Surf Dawgs. In addition, a full Canadian Division will feature the Vipers, Team Canada, the Western Canada Miners, and the Saskatchewan Silver Sox. The El Centro Imperials were also dropped.

The AWL in 2010 brought coaches from the Golden Baseball League, the Frontier League, the American Association, the Can-Am League, the Mexican Liga Del Norte, the Northern League, the Boston Red Sox and the Detroit Tigers. Major league alumni working as instructors and player placement consultants included Mike Marshall, Garry Templeton, Cory Snyder, Tim Johnson, Boots Day, Les Lancaster, Brooks Carey, Brent Bowers, Ozzie Virgil and more. Boston Red Sox scout Nick Belmonte and Detroit Tigers' hitting coordinator Dave Marcon ran the spring training section of the league the first week.

On December 15 it was announced that Japanese female pitching sensation Eri Yoshida, who became the first female professional pitcher in her home country last summer, will bring her sidearm knuckleball and participate in the 2010 AWL in hopes of attracting the attention of U.S. teams. This should be a tremendous benefit for all the players as the media attention and scout attendance should increase greatly.

On February 10, 2010, the New York Mets signed San Luis Atleticos shortstop Rylan Sandoval at the Arizona Winter League and the following week, the Mexico City Red Devils of the top Mexican League signed Yuma Scorpions catcher Ivan Villaescusa. On February 27, the Calgary Vipers became the first team in history to win both the Golden Baseball League Championship and the Arizona Winter League Championship by beating San Luis, 8–1, in the championship game shortened to eight innings by rain. More impressive is that the team did this within one year.

A record number of 59 players were signed to contracts (not just invited to spring training) by 18 teams from independent, European, and Latin American professional leagues. In addition four players were signed by major league baseball organizations—Rylan Sandoval (Mets), Brandon Fowler (Padres), Jay Broughton (Red Sox), Matthew Wedge (Oxbridge) and Andrew Snowdon (Phillies). During the summer of 2010 an additional 32 2010 AWL players that weren't drafted and signed at the AWL took advantage of the post-league AWL Placement Program and were signed and played professional baseball.

The smaller AWL sister league called the Arizona Summer League had all 52 players signed and played for professional teams this season.

=== 2011: New teams arrive and league expands to 10 ===
The AWL announced on January 5, 2011, their upcoming season schedule which shows that league expanding to ten teams as the Texas Winter League was folded into the AWL, adding three new teams and bringing one back. The Sonora Pilots returned after a two-year absence while the Long Beach Armada moved from the Golden Baseball League and two new teams, the Arizona RoadRunners and Team Mexico, were added to replace the Calgary Vipers and San Luis Atleticos respectively. The Yuma Scorpions captured their third AWL title since the league's inception, continuing their run as the only team to win more than one championship.

=== 2013 folding and 2016 resurrection ===
The league initially folded in 2013 due to the collapse and subsequent folding of the parent North American League (remnants of the GBL, United League Baseball and Northern League). However, the league was restarted in 2016 with several new teams.

=== 2018 folding ===
The league folded again in 2018 and essentially merged with the California Winter League.

== Teams ==
Arizona Winter League
Team	Founded
Edmonton Capitals	2016
El Paso Tejanos	2016
Laredo Apaches	2016
Pericos de Puebla	2016
Team Canada	2009
Yuma Wranglers	2016

== Defunct/Inactive Teams ==
- Arizona RoadRunners
- Blythe Heat
- Calexico Outlaws
- Calgary Vipers (2010)
- Colorado River Snow Falcons
- Edmonton Cracker-Cats (2010)
- Long Beach Armada
- Palm Springs Chill (2008–2009, now with the California Winter League)
- San Diego Surf Dawgs
- San Luis Atleticos
- Saskatchewan Silver Sox
- Somerton Stingers
- Sonora Pilots (2007–2009, 2011)
- Team Mexico (2011)
- Tecate Cervecarios ("Brewers" in Spanish) - halted season (2012)
- Yuma Scorpions

== League Alumni ==
In five seasons over 220 AWL players have been signed to professional contracts. They have been signed by every independent pro league in the U.S.; foreign leagues in Mexico, Italy, Japan, Korea, Taiwan, Holland, and Denmark; and by major league organizations including the Orioles, Red Sox, Blue Jays, Phillies, Giants, Dodgers, Diamondbacks, Mets and Royals. Two AWL players have made it all the way to the major leagues, they were both from the 2007 AWL:

- Sergio Romo
- Scott Richmond

== Season-by-season standings ==
=== 2007 ===
Final Standings

Winter League	Team	W	L	Win %	GB
	*Yuma Scorpions	13	8	.619	---
	*Canada Miners	13	8	.619	---
	Sonora Surf Dawgs	10	11	.476	3
	Snow Falcons	6	15	.286	7

* Clinched championship game spot

Championship

Yuma Scorpions 7, Canada Miners 6

=== 2008 ===
Final Standings

Winter League	Team	W	L	Win %	GB
	*Palm Springs Chill	15	4	.789	---
	*Canada Miners	11	8	.579	4
	*San Diego Surf Dawgs	10	9	.526	5
	*Blythe Heat	8	11	.421	11
	Yuma Scorpions	8	11	.421	11
	Sonora Pilots	5	14	.263	14

* Clinched playoff game spot

Playoffs

Semi-Finals
1	Palm Springs Chill	3
4	Blythe Heat	13
3	Canada Miners	10
2	San Diego Surf Dawgs	6

Finals
Canada Miners	5
Blythe Heat	10

=== 2009 ===
Final Standings

American Division	Team	W	L	Win %	GB
	*Yuma Scorpions	15	5	.750	---
	*Palm Springs Chill	12	8	.600	1.5
	Blythe Heat	8	12	.400	3.5
	San Diego Surf Dawgs	7	13	.350	4

International Division	Team	W	L	Win %	GB
	*San Luis Atleticos	14	6	.700	---
	*Saskatchewan Silver Sox	10	10	.500	2
	Team Canada	8	12	.400	3
	Western Canada Miners	6	14	.300	4

* Clinched playoff game spot

=== 2010 ===
Final Standings

American Division	Team	W	L	Win %	GB
	*Yuma Scorpions	12	8	.595	---
	*San Luis Atleticos	13	9	.591	---
	San Diego Surf Dawgs	10	9	.525	1.5
	Blythe Heat	10	10	.500	2

Canadian Division	Team	W	L	Win %	GB
	*Calgary Vipers	13	9	.591	---
	*Saskatchewan Silver Sox	9	12	.429	3.5
	Western Canada Miners	8	12	.400	4
	Team Canada	7	13	.350	5

* Clinched playoff game spot

=== 2011 ===
Final Standings

American Division	Team	W	L	Win %	GB
	*Yuma Scorpions	11	6	.647	---
	*Blythe Heat	7	9	.438	3.5
	Long Beach Armada	6	9	.400	4
	Arizona Roadrunners	4	11	.267	6
	San Diego Surf Dawgs	4	11	.267	6

International Division	Team	W	L	Win %	GB
	*Saskatchewan Silver Sox	11	5	.688	---
	*Team Canada	12	6	.667	---
	Western Canada Miners	10	6	.625	1
	Sonora Pilots	9	8	.529	1.5
	Team Mexico	6	9	.450	4.5

* Clinched playoff game spot

== AWL Champions ==
Season	Winner	Finalist	Result
2007	Yuma Scorpions	Canada Miners	7-6
2008	Blythe Heat	Canada Miners	10-8
2009	Yuma Scorpions		
2010	Calgary Vipers	San Luis Atleticos	8-1
2011	Yuma Scorpions		
2012	San Luis Atleticos	Blythe Heat	19-7
2016	Team Canada	Pericos de Puebla	4-2

== See also ==
- Baseball awards#Winter
