= Yuma Desert Rats =

Former professional baseball team in Arizona

- Logo

Information
- Location: Yuma, Arizona
- Ballpark: Desert Sun Stadium
- Founded: 2005
- Disbanded: 2012
- League championships: 0
- Division championships: 0
- Former name: Yuma Panthers (2011); Yuma Scorpions (2005–10); Yuma Bullfrogs (2000–03); Yuma Desert Dawgs (1995)
- Former leagues: North American League (2011); Golden Baseball League (2005–10); Western Baseball League (2000–03); Golden State League (1995); Arizona Winter League (2007–11)
- Colors: Black, red, white

The Yuma Desert Rats were a professional baseball team based in Yuma, Arizona, United States. From the 2005 season to the 2011 season, they were known as the Yuma Scorpions and played their home games at Desert Sun Stadium at the Ray Kroc Complex, former spring training home of the San Diego Padres.

They were members of the Golden Baseball League from 2005 to 2010 and the North American League in 2011. They were to have joined the American West Baseball League, but left the league due to a fallout with the league's founder and C.E.O. Michael Cummings. They were sold to Godfather Media, Inc. in 2012 and had announced a name change to the Yuma Panthers, but they never played. They were sold to Tim Ferguson for 2013 and renamed the Desert Rats, but they never played either.

The team also played as the Scorpions in the Arizona Winter League from 2007 to 2011.

== Team history ==
=== Golden Baseball League (2005–2010) ===
The Yuma Scorpions were one of the Golden Baseball League charter members in 2005 along with the Chico Outlaws, Fullerton Flyers, Long Beach Armada and San Diego Surf Dawgs in California; Mesa Miners and Surprise Fightin' Falcons in Arizona and the Japan Samurai Bears, the league's first (and so far only) traveling team. The Panthers, along with the Outlaws, Armada and Flyers remain the only charter teams still active in the league.

The team replaced the former Bullfrogs as the city of Yuma's professional baseball team. The Bulldogs played in the defunct Western Baseball League from 2000 to 2002, but folded after being financially unsuccessful and leaving a legacy of lawsuits and a trail of unpaid bills, players and employees. Other baseball teams are the Yuma Desert Dawgs of the defunct Golden State League (1995–96) and American West Leagues (1997–99). The San Diego Padres inhabited Desert Sun Stadium as their spring training complex and used it from 1968 to 1994 before they went to a new facility in Peoria, Arizona.

=== Affiliations with foreign leagues ===
On May 20, 2009, the Yuma Sun reported that the team had signed an affiliation agreement with the Colombian Professional Baseball League (CPBL), a league owned by Edgar and Edinson Rentería. Edgar played for the San Francisco Giants of Major League Baseball at the time of the signing. Under the terms of the affiliation, the CPBL handled all on-field personnel and player issues while the team retained control of promotions, concessions, and other front-office business. The Scorpions acted as a farm team for all four CPBL teams. It was reported by some news outlets to be the first time an independent American baseball club had formed an affiliation with a foreign team or league, however, in 1972 and 1973 the California League's team based in Lodi, California had an affiliation with Nippon Professional Baseball's Nishitetsu Lions. Yuma's partnership with the CPBL was at one point reportedly being made into a feature story for ESPN.

In early 2010 the Yuma Sun reported that the Scorpions had ended their affiliation with the CPBL, but had signed a new three-year affiliation agreement with the Venezuelan Baseball Federation (VBF).

The move was also portrayed as one that would improve the Scorpions on-field performance. Under the affiliation with the CPBL, the Scorpions went 29–47, worst in the GBL, including a 3–13 start. Several factors justify this assertion. Baseball is more popular in Venezuela than Colombia, leading to the Sun to speculate that that country will provide superior prospects to the CPBL agreement. Additionally, the previous agreement with the CPBL was only concluded hours before the start of the season, so that players had to literally get on a plane in Colombia, got off in Yuma and immediately play the season opener. The agreement with the VBF was agreed to three months prior to the start of the 2010 season. The Scorpions' manager for 2010, Darryl Brinkley, had experience playing in Venezuela.

=== North American League (2011) ===
The Scorpions were one of six former GBL teams to join the newly formed North American League in 2010 and began play in 2011.

On April 11, 2011, Jose Canseco and his twin brother, Ozzie, were added to the teams' roster, with Jose being a manager. In August of that year, 52-year-old former Major League player and then-Scorpions infielder Tony Phillips was involved in an altercation with former Scorpions manager Mike Marshall, then with the Chico Outlaws. Phillips punched Marshall in the face during the incident, causing the latter to press battery charges against the infielder.

== Changes of ownership and names ==
The team was sold to Godfather Media, Inc on January 31, 2012. The new owners announced they would be changing the team name to Yuma Panthers shortly thereafter on February 8, in time for the 2012 season. Additionally they announced that former Major League shortstop Garry Templeton would be replacing Canseco as field manager. The Arizona Winter League team is still known as the Scorpions.

On April 27, 2012, Godfather Media, LLC C.E.O. Michael Cummings announced that the Panthers were withdrawing from the North American League and were sitting out the 2012 season along with a team they acquired, the Orange County Flyers.

In 2012, Godfather Media, then owners of the Panthers, started a new league called the American West Baseball League and entered the Panthers as a member team.

The team was then sold to local investor Tim Ferguson and the name changed again. This time, becoming the Desert Rats. However, before they could throw a pitch, the team folded after Ferguson and the AWBL parted ways.

== Alumni ==
=== Scorpions who made it to the Big Leagues ===
Dane De La Rosa, RHP, Yuma Scorpions 2005, Tampa Bay Rays (2011)
Joey Gathright, OF, Yuma Scorpions 2011, Boston Red Sox (2011)
Sergio Romo, RHP, Yuma Scorpions Winter League 2007, San Francisco Giants (2010)

=== Scorpions acquired by MLB teams ===
Joey Gathright, OF, Boston Red Sox (2011)
Robby Scott, LHP, Boston Red Sox (2011)
JJ Leaper, RHP Oakland Athletics (2011)
Lee Cruz, OF, Houston Astros (2010)
Gilbert De La Vara, LHP, Detroit Tigers (2010)
Brandon Fowler, C, San Diego Padres (2010)
Rylan Sandoval, SS, New York Mets (2010)
Reynaldo Rodriguez, 1B, Boston Red Sox (2009)
Ryan Barba, SS, Atlanta Braves (2008)
Donald Brandt, P Milwaukee Brewers (2008)
Derrick Hale, SS, Cincinnati Reds (2008)
Kennard Jones, OF, Baltimore Orioles (2007)
Charles Merricks, P, Philadelphia Phillies (2007)
Scott Richmond, P, Toronto Blue Jays (2007)
Sergio Romo, P, San Francisco Giants (2007)
Cardoza Tucker, P, Houston Astros (2006)
Dane De La Rosa, P, Tampa Bay Rays (2005)
Jason Dewey, C, Colorado Rockies, (2005)

=== Major Leaguers who have played for the Scorpions ===
2005: Alex Arias SS, Joe Davenport P, Carl Sadler P, Jason Dewey
2006: Rusty Meacham P
2007: Pasqual Matos C
2008: Mike Esposito P, Felipe Lira P
2009: Emiliano Fruto, P
2010: Bill Pulsipher P, Alex Prieto P, Cha-Seung Baek P, Mike Johnson P
2011: Joey Gathright OF, Jose Canseco DH, Tony Phillips IF/OF, Ozzie Canseco OF/DH
2011: J.J. Leaper, P

=== Managers ===
Benny Castillo (2005–2006) Record: 79–91, Winning % : .465
Mike Marshall (2007–2008) Record: 89–74 Winning %: .546
Boris Villa (2009) Record: 29–47 Winning %: .382
Darryl Brinkley (2010) Record: 41–49, Winning % : .456
Jose Canseco (2011) Record: 35–53, Winning % : .398

== Quick facts ==
Founded: 2005
Stadium: Desert Sun Stadium
Uniform colors: Maroon, Black, Sand, White
Logo design: Joe Bosack
Mascot: Stinger
Current ownership: None
Local radio: KBLU-AM (As of June 2009)
First play-by-play broadcaster: Radio: Jim Howell
Current broadcasters: Radio: Jeff Edwards

== Season-by-season records ==
Golden Baseball League:

Season	W	L	Win %	Place	Playoff
2005	47	43	.522	2nd, Arizona Division	Did not qualify
2006	32	48	.400	4th/6th	Did not qualify
2007	42	34	.553	3rd/2nd	Did not qualify
2008	47	39	.547	2nd/4th, South Division	Did not qualify
2009	19	20	.487	5th, South Division	Did not qualify
2010	14	31	.311	4th, South Division	Did not qualify

North American League:

Season	W	L	Win %	Place	Playoff
2011	35	53	.398	5th, South Division	Did not qualify

== See also ==
- Yuma Scorpions (Arizona Winter League team)
