= Western Canada Miners =

Western Canada Miners (aka Canada Miners)
- Logo

Information
- League: Arizona Winter League (International); Arizona Summer League
- Location: Yuma, Arizona
- Ballpark: Desert Sun Stadium
- Founded: 2006
- League championships: 1 (ASL, 2009)
- Colors: Black, columbia blue, white, gold
- Ownership: Diamond Sports & Entertainment (North American League)
- Media: Yuma Sun
- Website: www.arizonawinterleague.com

The Western Canada Miners (also known as just the Canada Miners) are a professional independent baseball team based in Yuma, Arizona, and representing western Canada. They play in the developmental Arizona Winter League, a short-season instructional winter league affiliated with the North American League and they play their home games at Desert Sun Stadium in Yuma, as well as the San Diego Surf Dawgs, Saskatchewan Silver Sox, Team Canada and Yuma Scorpions. The team uses the logo and uniforms of the now-defunct Mesa Miners team and are owned by Diamond Sports & Entertainment.

On April 3, 2009, the Miners were announced as one of the three charter teams in the new Arizona Summer League, an instructional league also affiliated with the Golden Baseball League. The league was formed following the success of the AWL. In July 2009, after 14 games and no playoff, they were declared the very first ASL Champions. The ASL version was renamed the Bisbee Miners for 2010 and the Mesa Miners for 2011 and possibly beyond.

The NAL still owns the rights to the "Miners" brand (including name, logo and uniforms) and a future expansion team would have no ties to the original Mesa team. Some suggest that previously sought-after Canadian cities Kamloops and Kelowna should be the new home of the brand because of western Canada's rich mining history, similar to the Saskatchewan team (Regina or Saskatoon are being sought to host the Silver Sox if they continue to express interest).

== Season-by-season records ==
Arizona Winter League:

Season	W	L	Win %	Place	Playoff
2007	13	8	.619	T-1st	Qualified. Lost to Yuma in the Championship Game.
2008	11	8	.579	2nd	Qualified. Lost to Blythe in the Championship Game.
2009	6	14	.300	4th	Did not qualify.

Arizona Summer League:

Season	W	L	Win %	Place	Playoff
2009	9	5	.600	1st	No playoff. Declared first champions.

== See also ==
- Mesa Miners
- Bisbee Miners
