= Edmonton Capitals =

Minor-league professional baseball team in Edmonton, Alberta

| Logo | Cap insignia |

Information
- League: North American League (2011)
- Location: Edmonton, Alberta, Canada
- Ballpark: Telus Field
- Founded: 2005
- League championships: 2011
- Division championships: 2011
- Former name: Edmonton Capitals (2009–2011); Edmonton Cracker Cats (2005–2008)
- Former leagues: Golden Baseball League (2008–2010); Northern League (2005–2007)
- Colours: Navy Blue, Orange, Silver, White
- Ownership: Katz Baseball Corp.
- General manager: Patrick LaForge (Governor)
- Manager: Gordon Gerlach
- Media: CFRN Radio; Edmonton Sun; Edmonton Journal
- Website: CapsBaseball.ca

The Edmonton Capitals, originally the Edmonton Cracker-Cats, were a Canadian professional independent minor-league baseball team that played between 2005 and 2011 in several leagues.

The Capitals were based in Edmonton, Alberta. The team was founded in 2005 as the Edmonton Cracker-Cats and, with their provincial brethren the Calgary Vipers, joined the Northern League as part of that league's attempt to expand its footprint in Canada.

The Cracker-Cats moved to the Golden Baseball League in 2008 and were sold to Daryl Katz, the owner of the Edmonton Oilers, in 2009. The team adopted the name Capitals after Katz's purchase and also adopted the same colors as their corporate sibling.

The team last played in 2011 as a member of the North American League.

== Team history ==
=== Northern League (2005–2007) ===
The Cracker-Cats began as an expansion team in 2005 as a member of the Northern League. The name "Cracker-Cats" is derived from the oil industry term fluid catalytic cracking ("cat cracking" for short), which is part of the process of refining crude oil into gasoline by converting high boiling hydrocarbons into smaller molecules. They played the first game of their inaugural season on May 20, 2005, on the road against the Kansas City T-Bones. Their first home game did not take place until one week later when they hosted the Sioux Falls Canaries in front of 7,894.

On June 13, 2006, a string of bean balls in the first two innings touched off two major brawls between the Cracker-Cats and their provincial rivals, the Calgary Vipers. After Edmonton's Greg Morrison was hit by a Calgary pitch for the fourth time in five games, the Cracker-Cats responded by throwing at two Calgary players. The resulting melee was so violent that the umpires sent both teams off the field, and suspended the game for over an hour to consult with league officials. When the Cracker-Cats refused to return to the field afterward, the game was declared a forfeit and the Vipers were awarded a 9–0 victory even though Edmonton was leading 1–0. As a result of the suspension, Cracker-Cats manager Terry Bevington resigned. The league came down hard on both teams, as both managers and seven players were suspended a total of 79 games. Morrison blamed Calgary manager Mike Busch for the incident, believing that Busch held a grudge after both Morrison and another former Viper, J.P. Fauske, defected to the Cracker-Cats after leaving the Vipers after a falling out with the Calgary manager late in the 2005 season.

On July 18, 2006, Stubby Clapp was named Most Valuable Player of the Northern League All-Star Game. On September 3, 2006, the 'Cats finished their second season six games back in the wild card race and missed the playoffs.

The 2007 season was a major disappointment. Al Coates, a sports broadcaster, was named general manager of the Edmonton Cracker-Cats for the 2007 season, and despite adding three former Major Leaguers, Ryan Radmanovich, Mike Johnson, and Lou Pote, the 'Cats finished 38–58 and last in the league.

=== Golden Baseball League (2008–2010) ===
After three years in the Northern League, the Cracker-Cats joined the Golden Baseball League on October 24, 2007. This occurred just after the rival Vipers jumped to the league. On June 30, 2008, The 'Cats set a new attendance record of 8,676 fans against the Vipers.

On August 22, 2008, the Cracker-Cats clinched a playoff spot by defeating the Orange County Flyers 13–4 and won the second half. They faced the Vipers, who won the first half, in the first-ever North Division Championship Series, but were swept by Calgary 3 games to 0.

On February 4, 2009, the Cracker-Cats were purchased for $400,000 by Katz Baseball Corp. led by Daryl Katz who also owns the National Hockey League's Edmonton Oilers. A new name was drawn from a contest, renaming the franchise the Capitals.

=== North American League (2011) ===
The Capitals were one of six former GBL teams to join the newly formed North American League in 2010 and began play in 2011. The Capitals won the league championship in the inaugural season of the NAL. On February 21, 2012, the Katz group announced that the Edmonton Capitals had withdrawn from the North American League, citing that only four teams had registered for the 2012 season. They also went dark for the 2013 season after being unable to find a new league to play in. They were exploring options for the 2014 baseball season but it never happened. As of November 2026 they remained inactive.

== Year-by-year record ==
| | | | First Half | | Second Half | | Overall |
| Season | League | Division | W-L | Finish | W-L | Finish | W-L | Win% | Playoffs |
|---|---|---|---|---|---|---|---|---|---|
| 2005 | NL | North | 22–26 | 5th | 25–22 | 3rd | 47–48 | .495 | Did not qualify |
| 2006 | NL | North | 21–27 | 3rd | 23–25 | T-3 | 44–52 | .458 | Did not qualify |
| 2007 | NL | North | 19–29 | 4th | 19–29 | 4th | 37–58 | .389 | Did not qualify |
| 2008 | GBL | North | 22–21 | 2nd | 29–15 | 1st | 51–36 | .586 | Lost North Division playoff 0–3 to Calgary |
| 2009 | GBL | North | 23–18 | 2nd | 21-20 | 2nd | 44-38 | .537 | Lost North Division playoff 1–3 to Calgary. |
| 2010 | GBL | North | 29–16 | 2nd | 22-22 | 4th | 51-38 | .573 | Did not qualify |
| 2011 | NAL | North | 56-32 | 1st | N/A | N/A | 56-32 | .636 | Won Championship 4–1 over Rio Grande Valley |

== See also ==
- List of baseball teams in Canada
