= Long Beach Armada =

Logo
Cap insignia

Information
- League: Arizona Summer League (2010–11); Arizona Winter League (2011)
- Location: Long Beach, California
- Ballpark: Blair Field (Long Beach, California)
- Founded: 2005
- Disbanded: 2012
- League championships: 0
- Division championships: 1 (2007)
- Former league: Golden Baseball League (2005–09)
- Colors: Navy, maroon, tan, white, light blue, gray
- Ownership: Diamond Sports & Entertainment

The Long Beach Armada were an independent professional baseball team based in Long Beach, California, in the United States. The Armada was a member of the North Division of the now-defunct Golden Baseball League (GBL), which was not affiliated with either Major League Baseball or Minor League Baseball. The Armada played its home games at Blair Field.

The Armada fielded a team for the Arizona Summer League in 2010 months after suspending GBL operations, and then a team in the Arizona Winter League in 2011. The franchise has been owned by Diamond Sports & Entertainment, primary investors in the current North American League (NAL), since 2005.

The team had 13 different players during its first five seasons that played at the major league level. In addition, 21 Long Beach Armada players have had their contracts purchased by major league organizations.

== Team history ==
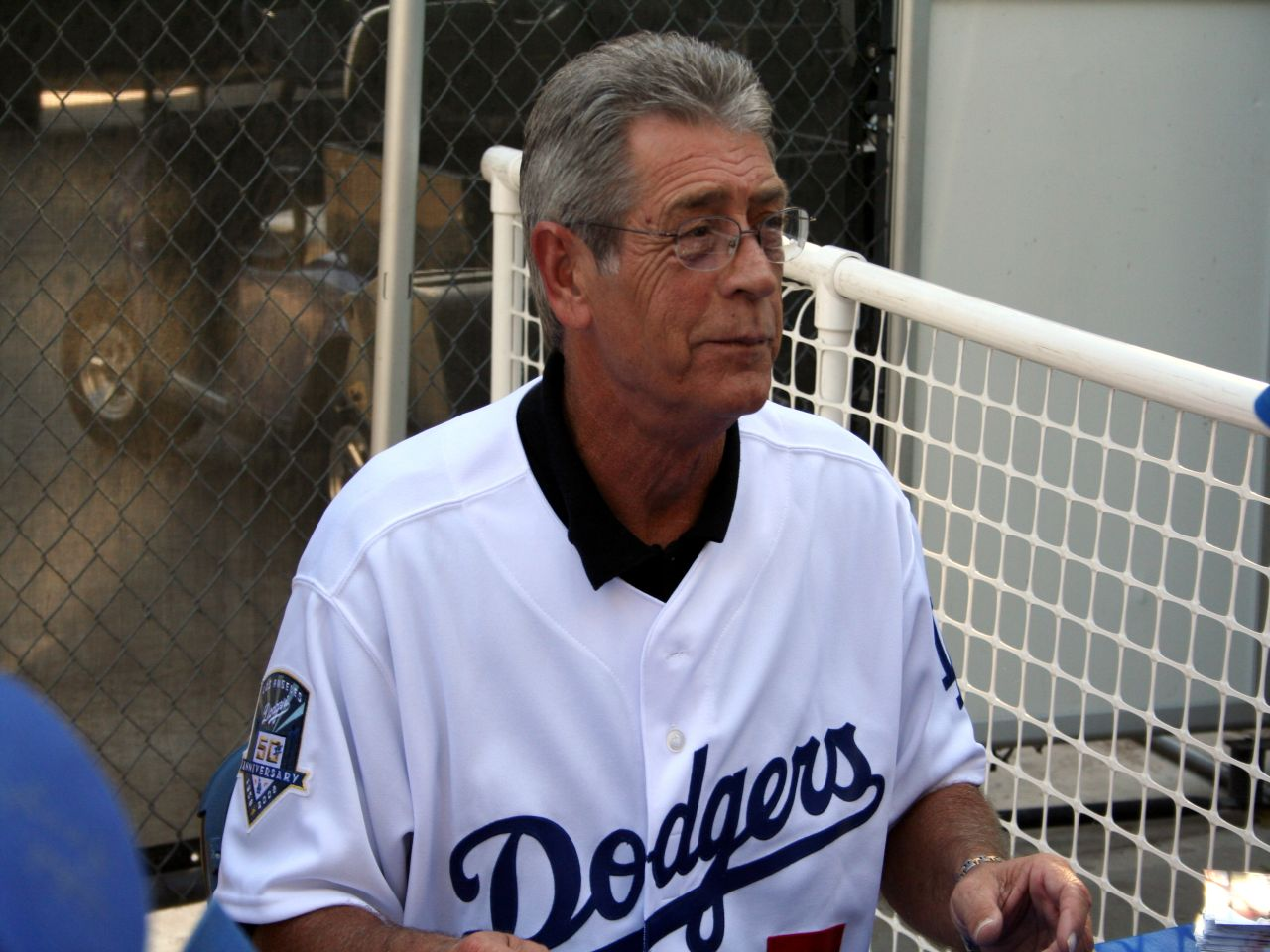
Steve Yeager

The team was one of the original eight GBL charter teams that began play in 2005. They began play in May 2005, three years after their predecessors, the Long Beach Breakers, folded along with the Western Baseball League. Former Armada manager Steve Yeager managed the Breakers to the WBL Championship in 2001, that team's inaugural season, beating the Chico Heat 3 games to 2.

=== Legal issues with the city ===
On December 18, 2009, the Long Beach Armada, to protect its ability to play at Blair Field, engaged lawyers to take action against the City of Long Beach and Long Beach State University alleging that the two public entities conspired to prematurely end the Armada's permit to play at Blair Field that still had three years left. The City of Long Beach made an arrangement to either sell or provide a long-term lease to Long Beach State University for the college to take over the maintenance and cost of running Blair Field, but first had to revoke the Armada's permit, which was standing in the way of completing a deal and had usage and concessions rights. As a result, the Armada suspended operations following the 2009 season.

=== Arizona Summer League (2010) ===
The Armada fielded a team in the Arizona Summer League in June 2010. They played alongside the Bisbee Miners and San Diego Surf Dawgs. They replaced the El Centro Imperials.

=== Arizona Winter League (2011) ===
On January 5, 2011, the Arizona Winter League released their schedule and it was announced the Armada would be joining the league along with the returning Sonora Pilots and two new teams, the Arizona RoadRunners and Team Mexico and would become the second team (behind the Surf Dawgs) to have played in all three leagues within the GBL/NABL system.

== Notable players ==
Notable former Armada players include former MLB star José Canseco; ex-Yankee Hideki Irabu; outfielder Josh Womack, who became a web sensation in June 2009 with the video of his "spinning bat trick"; and former Dodger José Lima, who was on the roster at the time of his death in May 2010.

In February 2008, The Armada signed Tony Torcato, who has since been traded to the Chico Outlaws. One month later, in March 2008, the Long Beach Armada signed former Major League Baseball pitcher Jerome Williams.

Other ex-major leaguers who have played for the Long Beach Armada include Bud Smith, Nick Bierbrodt, Adam Pettyjohn (the only Armada to have made it back to the big leagues from the club), Mark Quinn, Alan Newman, Chris Wakeland, Cleatus Davidson, Steve Smyth, and Seth Etherton.

== Season-by-season records ==
Golden Baseball League (2005–2009):

Season	W	L	Win %	Place	Playoff
2005	49	41	.544	3rd, California Division	Wild Card
2006	37	43	.463	3rd/5th	Did not qualify
2007	48	28	.632	2nd/1st	Lost in GBL Championship Series, 3-1
2008	47 (19/28)	40 (19/21)	.540	3rd/1st, South Division	Won South Division 2nd Half Title. Lost to Orange County in Division Series.

^{1} 2008 Season in Progress

Arizona Summer League (2010):

Season	W	L	Win %	Place	Playoff
2010	4	8	.333	3rd	No playoffs.
