= Yuma Sun =

Newspaper in Yuma, Arizona

- Type: Daily newspaper
- Owner: R.I.S.N. Operations, Inc.
- Founder: Mulford Winsor
- Publisher: Lisa Reilly
- Editor: Mara Knaub
- News editor: Rogelio Olivas
- Founded: 1896
- Language: English
- Headquarters: Yuma, Arizona
- Circulation: 8,413 (as of 2022)
- ISSN: 1538-0955
- OCLC number: 47732086
- Website: yumasun.com

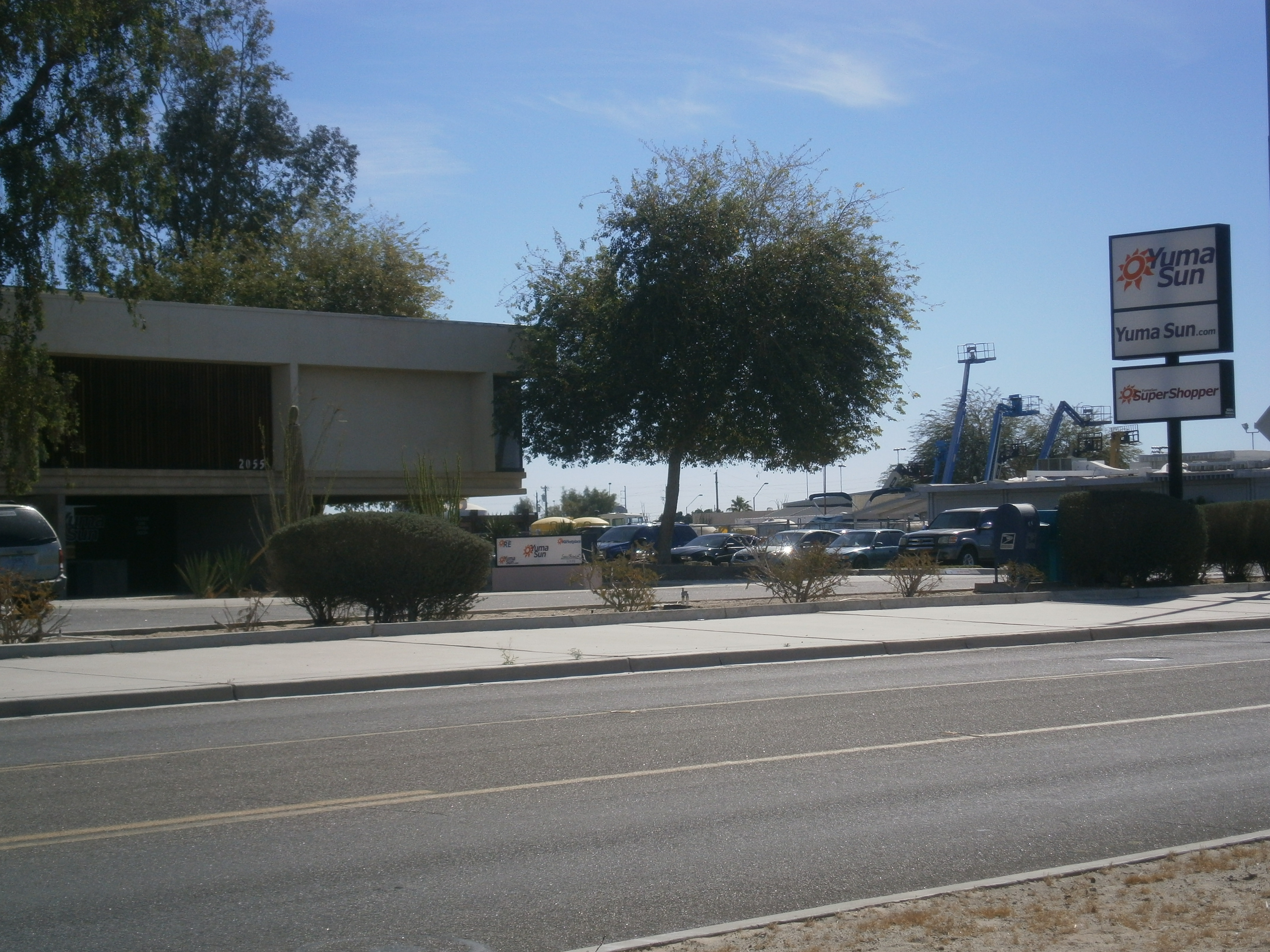
Offices of the Yuma Sun.

The Yuma Sun is a newspaper in Yuma, Arizona, United States.

== History ==
Though not founded until 1896, the Yuma Sun can trace its history back to the Arizona Sentinel, the first newspaper in what is now the Yuma area.

=== The Arizona Sentinel ===
On September 30, 1871, the Arizona Free Press was first published in Arizona City by David A. Gordon. In March 1872, C. L. Minor bought the paper and renamed it to the Arizona Sentinel. In October 1873, Judge William J. Berry purchased the paper and by then the town was named Yuma. He sold it three years later to a group of local business men.

Reporter John W. Dorrington acquired full ownership in 1881 and then worked as editor and publisher. In 1911, Dorrington sold the Sentinel to the Yuma Examiner and the combined paper was named the Arizona Sentinel and Yuma Weekly Examiner. William Harold Shorey was named editor.

In 1915, the paper merged with the Yuma Southwest to become the Arizona Sentinel Yuma Southwest. A little over a year later, the paper switched its masthead back to the Arizona Sentinel. In 1918 it was again renamed the Yuma Examiner and Arizona Sentinel. In 1924, the paper merged again with Yuma Valley News and became the Examiner Sentinel News. In 1925, the name was shortened to the Yuma Examiner. In 1927, Roy Dennis bought the paper from Shorey. He then split the Sentinel off from the Examiner and expanded it from a weekly into a daily.

On October 1, 1930, William A. Lee bought the Sentinel from Roy Dennis and James Forrest. On April 7, 1931, Lee fatally shot himself with a gun. It was soon discovered his real name was Hutton Bellah and he was married to two different women at the same time. Bellah was previously publisher of the Altus Times-Democrat and was reported missing. Mrs. Lee and Mrs. Bellah legally disputed ownership of the paper, which soon fell into the receivership of Mrs. Elanor McCoy. She sold it in April 1932 to Clyde E. Ely. He sold out a year later to Cliff Carter and Jack Gale. In May 1934, a fire damaged the paper's office.

=== The Yuma Morning Sun ===
The Yuma Morning Sun was first published on April 10, 1896. The Sun was founded by Mulford Winsor, the son of a newspaper editor. This rendition of the paper would be printed off and on for a period of nine years. Then, on November 15, 1905, the paper was renamed The Morning Sun, becoming a daily newspaper. In 1909, J.H. Westover bought the paper.

In 1916, the paper was met with disaster, when a flood caused the collapse of the Morning Sun's offices, destroying all of the files of paper for the previous 20 years. The disaster was a total loss for the paper. However, the paper received financial backing and shortly resumed publication.

In 1928, Westover sold the Sun to Edwin S. Worthington. Three years later Worthington, who was also a part-owner of the Beloit Daily News, suffered a severe concussion in an automobile crash, but his injuries were non-critical and he recovered.

=== Post-Merger ===
In 1935, during the Great Depression, F.F. McNaughton, of Illinois, and R.E. "Doc" Osborn of Indiana, bought the Yuma Evening Sentinel and the Yuma Morning Sun and merged the two under the Sun masthead. The Sun was owned by Worthington and the Sentinel was owned by Gale. At that time McNaughton also owned the Pekin Daily Times. Later Osborn's son Jones Osborn later became editor and publisher of the Sun.

In 1953, McNaughton's son-in-law Donald N. Soldwedel joined the business. Under his leadership, the family purchased several other newspapers and launched a commercial printing operation. In 1978, a holding company called Western News & Info was established and Soldwedel was named president. The Soldwedel family owned all the stock.

In 1984, Cox Enterprises purchased a half-interest in the Sun from the Soldwedels. The company acquired the remaining 50% stake later that year. In 1996, Cox sold its six Arizona daily papers to Thomson Newspapers, who in 2000 sold them to Freedom Communications. In 2013, Freedom sold the Yuma Sun and the Porterville Recorder to Rhode Island Suburban Newspapers.
