= Desert Sun Stadium =

Stadium in Yuma, Arizona

Coordinates: 32°39′47″N 114°38′11″W

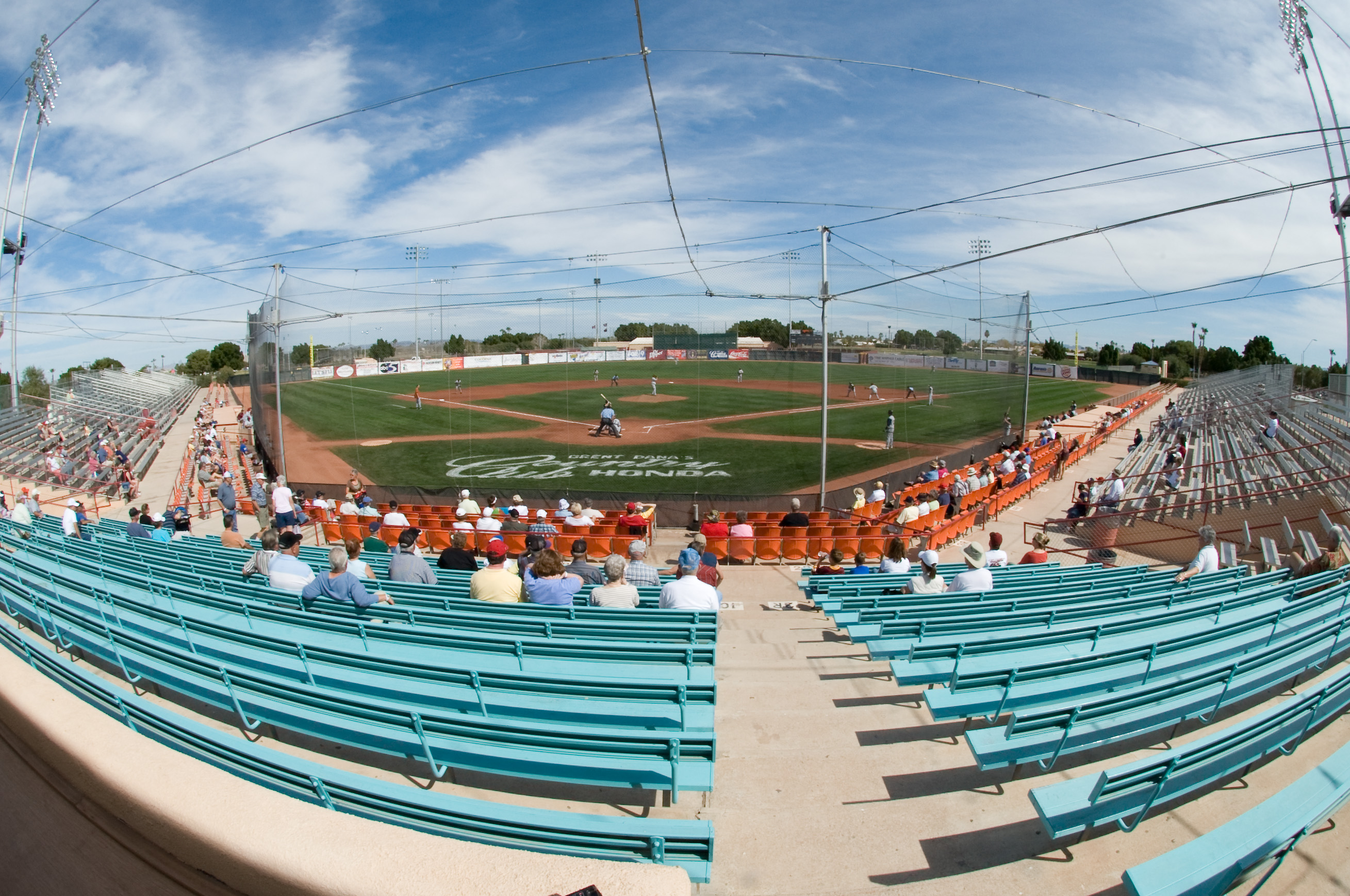
- Arizona Winter League on February 24, 2008
- Interactive map of Desert Sun Stadium
- Location: 1280 W Desert Sun Drive; Yuma, AZ 85365
- Owner: City of Yuma
- Capacity: 7,500
- Surface: Grass
- Field size: 120 yards x 75 yards

Construction
- Built: 1970
- Opened: 1970
- Renovated: 1984, 2015

Tenants
- Frontera United (UPSL) 2015–2017; Arizona Strikers FC (W-League) 2015; Yuma Scorpions/Panthers (NAL) 2005–2013; San Diego Padres (MLB) (Spring Training) 1970–1993; Arizona Diamondbacks (MiLB) (Spring Training) 1997; Yakult Swallows (NPB) (Spring Training) 1979–1998; Yuma City FC (UPSL) 2026-Present

Desert Sun Stadium is a converted soccer-specific stadium in Yuma, Arizona, originally built for baseball. It was the spring training home of the San Diego Padres from 1970 through 1993, the North American League's Yuma Scorpions minor league baseball team, the Arizona Winter League, and the Arizona Summer League. The stadium serves as the main field of the Ray Kroc Baseball Complex.

The stadium was built for the 1970 spring training season using a 2% hospitality tax and $100,000 in bonds. The Padres started training in Yuma in 1969 but trained at Keegan Field, on 24th Street, while the new ballpark was being built. The first game was March 6, 1970, with Arizona governor Jack Williams throwing out the ceremonial first pitch.

The stadium was expanded again in 1984.

In 2015, Desert Sun Stadium was converted to a soccer stadium by OneGoal LLC, an organization that paid for the $15,000 conversion fee. Frontera United had played at Desert Sun Stadium from 2015 to 2017. WWE Wrestling occasionally makes a stop at the complex.
