= North American League (baseball) =

Professional baseball minor league

- Most recent season or competition: 2012 North American League season
- North American League logo
- Sport: Baseball
- Founded: 2010
- Folded: 2012
- No. of teams: 10
- Country: USA; Canada
- Last champion: San Rafael Pacifics
- Website: northamericanleague.com

The North American League (officially known as the North American Baseball League) was an independent baseball league that began play in the 2011 season. The league consisted of a merger of three independent leagues, the Northern League of Illinois, United League Baseball of Texas, and the Golden Baseball League based in the Western United States and Western Canada and was a last-ditch effort to save the teams in said league. The league's chairman of the board was Dave Kaval, former CEO of Diamond Sports and Entertainment (owners of the now-defunct GBL), league president was Brian MacInnes and main board member was James C. Peters.

After playing two seasons, the North American League folded.

== Travel issues and division alignment ==
To keep travel costs from being a financial issue for the teams, in 2011 the league played in a division structure where teams played 75% of their 96-game schedule within their division and made just one lengthy roadtrip of 12 games outside their division. The season concluded with divisional playoffs followed by a North American Championship Series.

As of the 2012 season there was no inter division play. The North and United played all games within their own division. The only play outside the division was supposed to be a 3 out of 5 games for the North American Baseball League championship. The United Division refused to play a championship series.

The 2012 United Division championship series saw the Edinburg Roadrunners defeating the Fort Worth Cats, three games to none. In the North Division championship series, the San Rafael Pacifics topped Na Koa Ikaika Maui, two games to one.

== Level of play ==
The roster rules allowed all teams to keep their existing players from 2010. The three predecessor leagues had contracts of 35 players purchased by Major League organizations in 2010. In addition, these three leagues placed half of the prospects on the Baseball America Top Indy Prospects List and six of the 14 players on the 2010 Baseball America All-Indy First Team.

== Downfall of the league ==
On March 27, 2012, it was announced that Diamond Sports & Entertainment walked away as management of the league. As the 2012 season came to a close, the league finally folded due to financial instability and franchises withdrawing from the league.

== Teams that played ==
North American League
Team	Founded	City	Stadium	Capacity	Notes
Abilene Prairie Dogs	1995	Abilene, Texas	Walt Driggers Field	900	Charter team. Had not played since 1999. Folded after the 2012 season.
Calgary Vipers	2005	Calgary, Alberta	Foothills Stadium	6,000	Charter team. Were members of Golden Baseball League at time of merger. Joined that league from Northern League in 2005. Folded in 2011.
Chico Outlaws	2005	Chico, California	Nettleton Stadium	4,200	Charter team. Two-time Golden Baseball League Champions. Folded in 2012, remnants of franchise now with the San Rafael Pacifics.
Edinburg Roadrunners	2001	Edinburg, Texas	Edinburg Stadium	4,000	Charter team. Rejoined United League Baseball in 2013, team has since folded.
Edmonton Capitals	2005	Edmonton, Alberta	Telus Field	10,000	Charter team. Founded as Edmonton CrackerCats in 2005. Was a member of Golden Baseball League at time of merger, having joined that league from Northern League in 2008. Team is currently inactive.
Fort Worth Cats	2001	Fort Worth, Texas	LaGrave Field	4,100	Charter team. Joined league from the American Association of Independent Professional Baseball after being a charter franchise of that league. Joined United League Baseball in 2013.
Hawaii Stars	2012	Hilo, Hawaii	Wong Stadium	3,500	Moved to Pacific Association of Professional Baseball Clubs, have since folded.
Lake County Fielders	2009	Zion, Illinois	Fielders Stadium	7,000	Charter team. Folded in 2011 during the season as they were unable to make payroll and refused to appear at scheduled games.
McAllen Thunder	2011	McAllen, Texas	Edinburg Stadium	4,000	Charter team. Rejoined United League Baseball in 2013, have since folded.
Na Koa Ikaika Maui	2009	Wailuku, Hawaii	Maehara Stadium	2,500	Charter team. Played in Pacific Association of Professional Baseball Clubs, have since folded.
Rio Grande Valley WhiteWings	1994	Harlingen, Texas	Harlingen Field	4,500	Charter team. Rejoined United League Baseball in 2013.
San Angelo Colts	2000	San Angelo, Texas	Foster Field	4,200	Charter team; Rejoined United League Baseball in 2013
San Rafael Pacifics	2011	San Rafael, California	Albert Park	1,200	Second and final NABL champions; Joined the Pacific Association, now play in the Pecos League
Sonoma County Grapes	2012	Sonoma County, California	Traveling Team	N/A	Folded after one season

=== Teams that never played ===
- Henderson RoadRunners of Henderson, Nevada – relocated from St. George, Utah and were to have been a charter member of the league, but Morse Field was not ready to play and the franchise folded one year later.

== See also ==
- 2011 North American League season
- 2012 North American League season
- Golden Baseball League
- Northern League
- United League Baseball
