= 2013 Pacific Association season =

- League: Pacific Association
- Sport: Baseball
- Duration: May 28, 2013 – August 25, 2013
- Games: 75 (186 games in total)
- Teams: 5

Regular season
- Season champions: San Rafael Pacifics

League postseason
- Finals champions: Na Koa Ikaika Maui
- Runners-up: San Rafael Pacifics

PACA seasons
- 2014 →

The 2013 Pacific Association season was the inaugural season of the Pacific Association, an independent baseball league based in California and Hawaii. The league was formed following the dissolution of the North American Baseball League after the 2012 season.

On January 14, 2013, the Pacific Association was officially announced, with four charter members. Teams carried over from the NABL included the Hawaii Stars, Na Koa Ikaika Maui, and San Rafael Pacifics, while the traveling Sonoma County Grapes opted out after failing to reach lease agreements. The Vallejo Admirals were later announced as the league’s fourth charter franchise. Mike Marshall, who managed San Rafael in 2012, was appointed as the league’s first commissioner.

The season featured interleague play with Japan’s Baseball Challenge League (BCL) for the Hawaiian teams and with the Freedom Pro Baseball League (FPBL) for all teams. The season concluded with the Pacific Association playoffs in August. Following the season, both Hawaiian teams, the Hawaii Stars and Na Koa Ikaika Maui, ceased operations due to high travel costs, and the East Bay Lumberjacks did not return for a second season.

== Schedule ==
On February 6, 2013, the Pacific Association announced its schedule for the season. Member teams were slated to host roughly 40 regular-season home games, with the top four teams set to compete in a League Championship series from August 26 to August 28. Due to interleague play and financial issues, multiple cancellations and schedule changes occurred throughout the season.

=== Hawaii teams ===
On May 14, it was announced that both Na Koa Ikaika Maui and the Hawaii Stars would play a 54-game regular-season schedule, with 18 additional games against nonleague opponents: 12 against Baseball Challenge League (BCL) teams, six against guest teams, and six road games concluding their season with contests against the Freedom Pro Baseball League (FPBL). Both Maui and Hawaii completed their 12 scheduled games against BCL teams (six at home and six in Japan). The first schedule change occurred on July 17, when the Vallejo Admirals cancelled their trip to Hawaii and were replaced by the East Bay Lumberjacks. The Lumberjacks completed six scheduled games against Maui but played only three of six games in Hilo due to limited player availability and field scheduling conflicts. With the playoffs moved to an earlier date and the Freedom League failing to fulfill its scheduled trip to California (only Prescott completed its obligations), the Hawaiian teams cancelled a four-game series against each other in Hilo and their six-game road trip against Goodyear and Peoria.

=== California teams ===
The San Rafael Pacifics and Vallejo Admirals announced 75-game schedules for the 2013 season. Both teams were originally scheduled to play six games in Arizona against FPBL teams. Similarly, the Arizona teams were scheduled to travel to California to play 12 games (three games for each California team), but only Prescott fulfilled its games in California, resulting in significant scheduling challenges. Newly admitted East Bay played an extended schedule against both teams, and Santa Clara appeared in a single game against San Rafael.

For Vallejo, after completing 30 of its scheduled games, the team cancelled its trip to Hawaii due to financial issues. They scheduled replacement home games against Santa Rosa, but after two contests the team was suspended by the league and did not resume play for 12 days under new ownership.

== Spring training ==
Spring training for the 2013 Pacific Association season began in mid-May and continued until the teams departed for Arizona. The San Rafael Pacifics opened spring training against the San Quentin Prison All-Stars, defeating them 17–3. San Rafael then defeated the East Bay Lumberjacks in a doubleheader and also beat the Vallejo Admirals before losing a rematch to East Bay, finishing spring training with a 4–1 record as of May 24.

The East Bay Lumberjacks lost the doubleheader to San Rafael and also fell to Vallejo but earned a win against San Rafael in their final game, concluding spring training with a 1–3 record. Vallejo split its two contests, losing to San Rafael and defeating East Bay, finishing spring training at 1–1.

In Hawaii, the Hawaii Stars and Na Koa Ikaika Maui scrimmaged each other to prepare for their interleague games, completing their final tune-ups before the season began.

Vallejo hosted players as far away as Venezuela, Japan, Dominican Republic, and Puerto Rico.

== Standings ==
As of August 25, 2013

Pacific Association regular season standings
Pos	Team	G	W	L	T	Pct.	GB
1	CG – San Rafael Pacifics	75	54	21	0	.720	—
2	SF – Na Koa Ikaika Maui	75	47	28	0	.627	7.0
3	RR – Vallejo Admirals	60	28	32	0	.467	18.5
4	RR – Hawaii Stars	68	26	41	1	.390	24.0
5	RR – East Bay Lumberjacks	37	7	30	0	.189	28.0

- CG – Advanced directly to the championship game
- SF – Advanced to the semifinal
- RR – Qualified for the round-robin play-in tournament

== Postseason ==
The Vallejo Admirals hosted a round-robin play-in tournament at Wilson Park from August 20 to 24, featuring the Hawaii Stars and East Bay Lumberjacks. The tournament determined which team would advance to the semifinals. Vallejo won the play-in tournament to earn a spot against Na Koa Ikaika Maui in the semifinals. Hawaii and East Bay did not play the final game, as Vallejo had already clinched advancement.

The San Rafael Pacifics hosted both the semifinal and championship games at Albert Park on August 25. Na Koa Ikaika Maui defeated the Vallejo Admirals 8–3 in the semifinal, then upset the heavily favored San Rafael Pacifics 6–1 in the championship to win the inaugural Pacific Association of Professional Baseball Clubs title.

=== Round robin ===
Pos	Team	Pld	W	L	RF	RA	RD	PCT	GB	Qualification
1	Vallejo Admirals (H)	4	4	0	49	10	+39	1.000	—	Advance to Semifinals
2	Hawaii Stars	3	1	2	18	24	−6	.333	2.5	
3	East Bay Lumberjacks	3	0	3	3	36	−33	.000	3.5	

Source: CG
(H) Hosts

Semifinal
3	Vallejo Admirals	3
2	Na Koa Ikaika Maui	8
1	San Rafael Pacifics

Championship Game
2	Na Koa Ikaika Maui	6
1	San Rafael Pacifics	1

- The top-seeded San Rafael Pacifics received a bye to the championship game.

== Managerial changes ==
=== Offseason ===
Team	Former Manager	Reason For Leaving	New Manager	Notes
Na Koa Ikaika Maui	Jamie Vermilyea	New job	Jeff Brooks	Vermilyea accepted a pitching coach position with the Winnipeg Goldeyes of the American Association. Brooks, who served as the club's hitting coach, was promoted for the 2013 season.
San Rafael Pacifics	Mike Marshall	League commissioner	James Frisbie	On January 14, 2013, Marshall was announced as the Pacific Association's league commissioner. On January 21, 2013, Frisbie was announced as the Pacifics' manager.
Vallejo Admirals	—N/a	—N/a	Pedro Guerrero	On May 9, 2013, Guerrero was announced as the team's first manager.

=== In-season ===
Team	Former Manager	Reason For Leaving	New Manager	Notes
San Rafael Pacifics	James Frisbie	Resigned	Ryan Priddy	After a 3–3 start, Frisbie resigned and later became manager of the Rockford Aviators of the Frontier League. On June 7, 2013, Pacifics hitting coach Ryan Priddy was named manager for the remainder of the season.
Vallejo Admirals	Pedro Guerrero	Fired	Tito Fuentes Jr.	On July 16, 2013, Guerrero was fired. Under new ownership, assistant coach Tito Fuentes Jr. was named manager. He led the Admirals to a 16–11 record from July 23 through the end of the season.

== League leaders ==
=== Hitting ===
Stat	Player	Team	Total
HR	Johnny Woodard; Ray Serrano	San Rafael Pacifics; Na Koa Ikaika Maui	11
AVG	Price Kendall	San Rafael Pacifics	.339
RBIs	Maikel Jova	San Rafael Pacifics	68
SB	Matt Hibbert	Hawaii Stars	32

=== Pitching ===
Stat	Player	Team	Total
W	Chad Blackwell	Na Koa Ikaika Maui	10
ERA	Chad Blackwell	Na Koa Ikaika Maui	1.91
SO	Logan Odom	San Rafael Pacifics	100
SV	Colin Allen	San Rafael Pacifics	15

To qualify as league leader for hitter, AVG - Minimum of plate appearances of 2.7 per team game. To qualify as league leader for pitcher, ERA - Minimum inning(s) of .8 pitched per team game.

== Awards and honors ==
=== Individual Awards ===
Award	Player	Team
Most Valuable Player	Price Kendall	San Rafael Pacifics

=== Monthly awards ===
==== Player of the Month ====
Month	Player	Team
June	Kyle Dhanani	San Rafael Pacifics
July	Maikel Jova	San Rafael Pacifics
August	N/A	N/A

==== Pitcher of the Month ====
Month	Player	Team
June	Tyler Pearson	San Rafael Pacifics
July	Logan Odom	San Rafael Pacifics
August	N/A	N/A

=== Weekly awards ===
==== Player of the Week ====
Month	Player	Team
June 18	Katsuaki Furuki	Hawaii Stars
June 24	Brenden Davis	Hawaii Stars
July 2	Jeremy Williams	Na Koa Ikaika Maui
July 9	Brandon Gregorich	Na Koa Ikaika Maui
July 15	Brenden Davis (2)	Hawaii Stars
July 23	Maikel Jova	San Rafael Pacifics
July 30	Matt Kavanaugh	San Rafael Pacifics
August 6	Johnny Woodard	San Rafael Pacifics
August 13	Andre White, Steve Detwiler	East Bay Lumberjacks

==== Pitcher of the Week ====
Month	Player	Team
June 18	Colin Allen	San Rafael Pacifics
June 24	Mike Williams	Na Koa Ikaika Maui
July 2	Logan Odom	San Rafael Pacifics
July 9	Kyle Brueggemann	Vallejo Admirals
July 15	Bennett Whitmore	San Rafael Pacifics
July 23	Dallas Mahan	Hawaii Stars
July 30	Kyle Brueggemann (2)	Vallejo Admirals
August 6	Wayne Franklin	East Bay Lumberjacks
August 13	David Russo	East Bay Lumberjacks

== Pacific Association vs. other leagues ==
=== 2013 Record vs. opponents ===
Team	EB	HI	MAUI	SRF	VAL	BCL	FPBL	Guests
East Bay	—	0–7	1–8	2–8	4–7	—	—	—
Hawaii	7–0	—	8–15	3–12	3–5	2–9–1	—	3–0
Maui	8–1	15–8	—	8–10	6–4	7–5	—	3–0
San Rafael	8–2	12–3	10–8	—	13–5	—	6–3	5–0
Vallejo	7–4	5–3	4–6	5–13	—	—	3–5	4–1

2013 records against non-conference foes:

Regular season
Other Leagues	Record
BCL	9–14–1
FPBL	9–8
Guests	15–1
Other leagues Total	33–23–1

=== Na Koa Ikaika Maui vs. BCL ===
Na Koa Ikaika won the series, 4–2.

Game	Date	Score	Location	Time	Attendance
1	May 28	Ishikawa Million Stars – 2, Na Koa Ikaika – 9	Maehara Stadium	3:00	800
2	May 29	Ishikawa Million Stars – 4, Na Koa Ikaika – 5	Maehara Stadium	2:00	200
3	May 30	Ishikawa Million Stars – 5, Na Koa Ikaika – 2	Maehara Stadium	2:34	--
4	May 31	Shinano Grandserows – 0, Na Koa Ikaika – 3	Maehara Stadium	3:00	--
5	June 1	Shinano Grandserows – 7, Na Koa Ikaika – 2	Maehara Stadium	3:13	--
6	June 2	Shinano Grandserows – 4, Na Koa Ikaika – 5	Maehara Stadium	3:14	--

Series tied, 3–3.

Game	Date	Score	Location	Time	Attendance
1	July 30	Na Koa Ikaika – 6, Fukui Miracle Elephants – 4	Kanazawa, Japan	2:14	514
2	July 31	Na Koa Ikaika – 3, Toyama Thunderbirds – 9	Tonami Stadium	2:30	422
3	August 1	Na Koa Ikaika – 8, Ishikawa Million Stars – 3	Ishikawa, Japan	2:27	411
4	August 2	Na Koa Ikaika – 3, Shinano Grandserows – 5	Nagano Olympic Stadium	2:38	797
5	August 4	Na Koa Ikaika – 2, Gunma Diamond Pegasus – 12	Takasago Municipal Baseball Stadium	2:28	384
6	August 5	Na Koa Ikaika – 6, Niigata Albirex Baseball Club – 4	Niigata Prefectural Baseball Stadium	2:33	649

=== Hawaii Stars vs. BCL ===
Shinano & Ishikawa won the series, 4–2.

Game	Date	Score	Location	Time	Attendance
1	May 28	Shinano Grandserows – 5, Hawaii Stars – 3	Wong Stadium	3:30	317
2	May 29	Shinano Grandserows – 7, Hawaii Stars – 2	Wong Stadium	3:32	--
3	May 30	Shinano Grandserows – 2, Hawaii Stars – 5	Wong Stadium	2:30	--
4	May 31	Ishikawa Million Stars – 6, Hawaii Stars – 3	Wong Stadium	3:25	--
5	June 1	Ishikawa Million Stars – 3, Hawaii Stars – 4	Wong Stadium	3:26	--
6	June 2	Ishikawa Million Stars – 4, Hawaii Stars – 0	Wong Stadium	3:14	155

BCL won the series, 5–0–1.

Game	Date	Score	Location	Time	Attendance
1	July 30	Hawaii Stars – 2, Gunma Diamond Pegasus – 10	Takasago Municipal Baseball Stadium	2:21	424
2	July 31	Hawaii Stars – 0, Niigata Albirex Baseball Club – 11	Niigata Prefectural Baseball Stadium	2:15	597
3	August 1	Hawaii Stars – 3, Shinano Grandserows – 13	Nagano Olympic Stadium	2:38	585
4	August 2	Hawaii Stars – 6, Fukui Miracle Elephants – 6	Kanazawa, Japan	2:21	592
5	August 3	Hawaii Stars – 1, Toyama Thunderbirds – 5	Tonami Stadium	2:12	546
6	August 4	Hawaii Stars – 6, Ishikawa Million Stars – 8	Ishikawa, Japan	2:18	1,868

=== San Rafael Pacifics vs. Freedom League ===
San Rafael won the series, 6–3.

Game	Date	Score	Location	Time	Attendance
1	May 31	San Rafael Pacifics – 4, Montezuma Federals – 7	Roughrider Park	2:57	--
2	June 1 (DH)	San Rafael Pacifics – 11, Montezuma Federals – 7	Roughrider Park	1:49	--
3	June 1 (DH)	San Rafael Pacifics – 14, Montezuma Federals – 5	Roughrider Park	2:46	--
4	June 2	San Rafael Pacifics – 7, Montezuma Federals – 18	Roughrider Park	2:57	--
5	June 3	San Rafael Pacifics – 21, Montezuma Federals – 6	Roughrider Park	3:25	--
6	June 4	San Rafael Pacifics – 4, Goodyear Centennials – 9	Goodyear Ballpark	3:12	--
7	August 6	Montezuma Federals – 5, San Rafael Pacifics – 8	Albert Park	3:04	--
8	August 7	Montezuma Federals – 2, San Rafael Pacifics – 4	Albert Park	2:35	--
9	August 8	Montezuma Federals – 2, San Rafael Pacifics – 7	Albert Park	2:44	--

=== Vallejo Admirals vs. Freedom League ===
Freedom League won the series, 3–5.

Game	Date	Score	Location	Time	Attendance
1	May 31	Vallejo Admirals – 0, Goodyear Centennials – 4	Goodyear Ballpark	2:16	--
2	June 1	Vallejo Admirals – 5, Phoenix Prospectors – 10	Goodyear ballpark	3:30	--
3	June 2 (DH)	Vallejo Admirals – 7, Peoria Explorers – 13	Goodyear ballpark	2:47	--
4	June 2 (DH)	Vallejo Admirals – 11, Goodyear Centennials – 7	Goodyear ballpark	3:58	--
5	June 4	Vallejo Admirals – 3, Phoenix Prospectors – 8	Goodyear Ballpark	2:13	--
6	August 9	Montezuma Federals – 1, Vallejo Admirals – 2	Wilson Park	2:29	--
7	August 10	Montezuma Federals – 3, Vallejo Admirals – 4	Wilson Park	4:14	--
8	August 11	Montezuma Federals – 9, Vallejo Admirals – 7	Wilson Park	3:21	--

== Head-to-head matchups ==
2013 Pacific Association Head-to-Head Standings

Team	EB	Fukui	GY	Gunma	HI	Ishikawa	MAUI	Niigata	Peoria	PHX	Prescott	SRF	SC	SR	Shinano	Toyama	VAL	Totals For
East Bay	—	—	—	—	0–7	—	1–8	—	—	—	—	2–8	—	—	—	—	4–7	7–30
Fukui	—	—	—	5–2–1	0–0–1	7–14–2	0–1	1–6–1	—	—	—	—	—	—	2–6	10–11–2	—	25–40–7
Goodyear	—	—	—	—	—	—	—	—	4–8	8–7	7–6	1–0	—	—	—	—	1–1	21–22
Gunma	—	2–5–1	—	—	1–0	3–5	1–0	6–14–3	—	—	—	—	—	—	12–11	6–2	—	31–37–4
Hawaii	7–0	0–0–1	—	0–1	—	1–3	8–15	0–1	—	—	—	3–12	—	3–0	1–3	0–1	3–5	26–41–1
Ishikawa	—	14–7–2	—	5–3	3–1	—	1–3	2–6	—	—	—	—	—	—	3–4–1	9–14	—	37–38–3
Maui	8–1	1–0	—	0–1	15–8	3–1	—	1–0	—	—	—	8–10	—	3–0	2–2	0–1	6–4	47–28
Niigata	—	6–1–1	—	14–6–3	1–0	6–2	0–1	—	—	—	—	—	—	—	—	19–4	6–2	52–16–4
Peoria	—	—	8–4	—	—	—	—	—	—	10–9	2–6	—	—	—	—	—	1–0	21–19
Phoenix	—	—	7–8	—	—	—	—	—	9–10	—	5–4	—	—	—	—	—	2–0	23–22
Prescott	—	—	6–7	—	—	—	—	—	6–2	4–5	—	2–6	—	—	—	—	1–2	19–22
San Rafael	8–2	—	0–1	—	12–3	—	10–8	—	—	—	6–2	—	1–0	4–0	—	—	13–5	54–21
Santa Clara	—	—	—	—	—	—	—	—	—	—	—	0–1	—	—	—	—	—	0–1
Santa Rosa	—	—	—	—	0–3	—	0–3	—	—	—	—	0–4	—	—	—	—	1–4	1–14
Shinano	—	6–2	—	11–12	3–1	4–3–1	2–2	4–19	—	—	—	—	—	—	—	4–4	—	34–43–1
Toyama	—	11–10–2	—	2–6	1–0	14–9	1–0	2–6	—	—	—	—	—	—	4–4	—	—	35–35–2
Vallejo	7–4	—	1–1	—	5–3	—	4–6	—	0–1	0–2	2–1	5–13	—	4–1	—	—	—	28–32
Totals Against	30–7	40–25–7	22–21	37–31–4	41–26–1	38–37–3	28–47	16–52–4	19–21	22–23	22–19	21–54	1–0	14–1	43–34–1	35–35–2	28–32	461–461–22

Updated with the results of all games through the regular season. No games are counted twice. Complete results for BCL, Freedom Pro Baseball League, and Pacific Association. Hawaii and Maui games are not counted twice. BCL teams’ head-to-head standings are included in the grid. In 2013, BCL recorded 72 official league games. The six games played by Ishikawa and Shinano in May at Hawaii are not part of BCL's official standings. They are official for the Pacific Association standings and are included for the purpose of this grid.

== Notable players ==
Former Major League Baseball players who played in the Pacific Association in 2013

- Wayne Franklin (East Bay)
- Onan Masaoka (Hawaii)
- Bill Lee (San Rafael)
- Dane Sardinha (Hawaii)
- Chris Waters (Maui)

Other notable players who played in the Pacific Association in 2013

- Charlie Mirabal (Maui)
- Eri Yoshida (Maui)
