= 2012 North American League season =

Independent baseball league season

2012 NAL season
- League: North American League
- Sport: Baseball
- Duration: May 23, 2011 – September 3, 2012

Regular season

League postseason
- Northern Division champions: San Rafael Pacifics
- Northern Division runners-up: Maui Na Koa Ikaika
- United Division champions: Edinburg Roadrunners
- United Division runners-up: Fort Worth Cats

NAL seasons
- ← 2011

The 2012 North American League season was the second season of the North American League. There was no inter division play between the North and United division. San Rafael Pacifics outfielder Maikel Jova held a NABL record 37 game hit streak during the season.

== Season schedule ==
The 10 teams in the league were divided into two divisions: North and United. The North Division consisted of four teams, while the United Division had six. The United Division did not play a championship series against the North; instead, it held a best-of-three semifinal series and a best-of-five division championship series. The North Division held a single best-of-three final series.

=== Exhibition and international games ===
Na Koa Ikaika Maui hosted the Ishikawa Million Stars from Japan on July 10 and 11, 2012, in an unofficial two-game exhibition series, which the teams split. Ishikawa competed in the Baseball Challenge League, an independent professional league in Japan. Following the North American League postseason, Na Koa Ikaika recruited several players from the Hawaii Stars to participate in a two-game series against Ishikawa in Japan, which was also split between the teams.

The trip allowed team executives — including Maui owner Bob Young, CEO David Andrus, and COO Chris Osgood — to meet multiple times with the owners of six BCL teams to discuss potential interleague play for the 2013 season. The discussions included agreements on player trades and exchanges, providing players opportunities to compete internationally.

Separately, the Sonoma County Grapes hosted the East Bay Lumberjacks in an unofficial exhibition on August 2, 2012, marking the franchise’s first home game while exploring potential venues for the 2013 season. The game, held at Recreational Park in Healdsburg, California, ended in an 8–2 victory for the Grapes. A second home exhibition against the San Rafael Pacifics, scheduled for August 9, was later canceled due to a scheduling conflict.

== Regular season standings ==
as of September 3, 2012

North Division Regular Season Standings
Pos	Team	G	W	L	Pct.	GB
1	y – San Rafael Pacifics	60	34	26	.567	--
2	x – Maui Na Koa Ikaika	66	36	30	.545	1.0
3	e – Hawaii Stars	54	25	29	.463	6.0
4	e – Sonoma County Grapes	48	19	29	.396	9.0

United Division Regular Season Standings
Pos	Team	G	W	L	Pct.	GB
1	y – Edinburg Roadrunners	96	60	36	.625	--
2	x – Fort Worth Cats	96	52	44	.542	8.0
3	x – Rio Grande Valley White Wings	95	51	44	.537	8.5
4	x – San Angelo Colts	96	51	45	.531	9.0
5	e – Abilene Prairie Dogs	87	34	53	.391	21.5
6	e – McAllen Thunder	88	31	57	.352	25.0

- y – Clinched division
- x – Clinched playoff spot
- e – Eliminated from playoff contention

== Statistical leaders ==
=== Hitting ===
Stat	Player	Team	Total
HR	Brandon Jones	Fort Worth Cats	18
AVG	Chad Gabriel	Fort Worth Cats	.363
RBIs	Cory Patton	San Angelo Colts	70
SB	Stantrel Smith	Edinburg Roadrunners	59

=== Pitching ===
Stat	Player	Team	Total
W	Celson Polanco	Rio Grande Valley WhiteWings	12
ERA	Jesse Smith	Maui Na Koa Ikaika	1.33
SO	Celson Polanco	Rio Grande Valley WhiteWings	108
SV	Erik Draxton	San Angelo Colts	23

To qualify as league leader for hitter, AVG - Minimum of plate appearances of 2.7 per team game. To qualify as league leader for pitcher, ERA - Minimum inning(s) of .8 pitched per team game.

== Playoffs ==
=== Format ===
In 2012, the North division played a best-of-three finals between the top two teams. The San Rafael Pacifics defeated Maui Na Koa Ikaika two games to one, claiming them the North Division Champions. In the United division, the top four teams advanced to the playoffs. The first round was a best-of-three series. The second round was a best-of-five series for the United Division Championship. The Edinburg Roadrunners defeated the Fort Worth Cats three games to zero. The North playoffs were held August 24-26th while the United playoffs were held September 4-9th.

=== Playoff North Division ===
North Division Championship Series (best-of-three)
North Division
2	San Rafael Pacifics	7	0	6
1	Maui Na Koa Ikaika	6	3	5

=== Playoff United Division ===
United Division semi-final Series (best-of-three)
United Division
2	Edinburg Roadrunners	8	11	X
0	Rio Grande Valley WhiteWings	7	5	X
2	Fort Worth Cats	11	6	X
0	San Angelo Colts	7	0	X

United Division Championship Series (best-of-five)
3	Edinburg Roadrunners	12	11	10	X	X
0	Fort Worth Cats	8	5	1	X	X

=== Northern Division Individual Awards ===
The manager's of the Pacifics, Na Koa Ikaika, Hawaii Stars and Sonoma County Grapes voted to determine the post-season awards and select the division's post-season All-Star Team.

Award	Player	Team
Most Valuable Player	Maikel Jova	San Rafael
Pitcher of the Year	Jesse Smith	Maui
Rookie of the Year	Mark Micowski	Sonoma County

=== Northern Division Postseason All-Star Team ===
Position	Player	Team
C	Nick Valdez	Maui
1B	Johnny Woodard	San Rafael
2B	Kalaika Kahoohalahala	Maui
SS	Arnoldo Ponce	Hawaii
3B	Jose Sanchez	Maui
OF	Maikel Jova	San Rafael
OF	Keoni Manago	Hawaii
OF	Steve Tedesco	Hawaii
DH	Anthony Lopez	Hawaii
Starter RHP	Jesse Smith	Maui
Starter LHP	Brian Gump	San Rafael
Reliever RHP	Victor Ferrante	Maui
Reliever LHP	Matthew Stabelfeld	San Rafael

=== Northern Division Honorable Mention All-Star Team ===
Position	Player	Team
C	D. J. Dixon	Sonoma County/ San Rafael
C	Adam Jacobs	Hawaii
1B/DH	Brandon Gregorich	Sonoma County
1B/DH	Anthony Lopez	Hawaii
2B	Chase Fontaine	San Rafael
SS	Danny Sandoval	Maui
INF	Gered Mochizuki	Maui
OF	Waylen Sing Chow	Maui
Starter RHP	Dustin Crenshaw	Sonoma County
Starter RHP	Jake Rasner	San Rafael
Reliever RHP	Julian Arballo	San Rafael
Reliever RHP	Josh Larson	Hawaii/ Maui

== Notable players ==
Former Major League Baseball players who played in the North American League in 2012

- Rick Bauer (Fort Worth)
- Benji Gil (Fort Worth)
- James Hoyt (Edinburg)
- Bill Lee (San Rafael)
- Danny Mota (San Angelo)
- Billy Petrick (Abilene), (Edinburg)
- Tony Phillips (Edinburg)
- Al Reyes (Rio Grande Valley)
- Danny Sandoval (Maui)
