= Maehara =

Maehara (Japanese: 前原, Hepburn: Maehara) is a Japanese surname. Notable people with this surname include:

- Ichiro Maehara, Hawaiian baseball player from the 1960s onward.
- Shiyuna Maehara (前原しゆな), former member of j-pop group BeForU.
- Seiji Maehara (前原 誠司), former leader of the 2016 iteration of the Japanese Democratic Party.

== Fictional characters ==
- Shinobu Maehara (前原 しのぶ), a character in Love Hina
- Hiroto Maehara (前原 陽斗), a character in the Assassination Classroom anime and manga

== See also ==
- Maehara Stadium, Wailuku, Hawaii
- 8036 Maehara
