= Hawaii Stars =

Information
- League: Pacific Association (2013)
- Location: Hilo, Hawaii
- Ballpark: Wong Stadium
- Founded: 2012
- Disbanded: 2013
- Former league: North American League (2012)
- Colors: Blue, red, white
- Ownership: Hawaii Baseball LLC, Robert Young
- Manager: Garry Templeton Jr
- Website: www.hawaiistarsprobaseball.com

The Hawaii Stars were an independent professional baseball team based out of Hilo, Hawaii. They were charter members of the Pacific Association. They played their home games at Wong Stadium in Hilo. In 2012, they were also members of the North American League. The Stars were managed by Garry Templeton Jr. son of former Major League All-Star Garry Templeton.

== History ==
=== 2012: North American League ===
In 2012, Calgary, Edmonton and Lake County folded in the North Division. Hawaii Baseball LLC, owners of Maui then started a second franchise, the Hawaii Stars. In May, Garry Templeton Jr. was announced as manager. The Stars went 25–29 in the regular season and finished third in the North Division. Arnoldo Ponce, Keoni Manago, Steve Tedesco and Anthony Lopez were named to the North Division All-Star team. At the conclusion of the 2012 season, a few Stars players traveled to Japan where they joined Na Koa Ikaika in an exhibition series against the Ishikawa Million Stars of the Baseball Challenge League.

=== 2013: Pacific Association ===
On January 14, it was announced that Stars would become a charter member of the Pacific Association along with Maui, San Rafael and Sonoma County. Later it would be announced that the Vallejo Admirals would be taking place of the Grapes. Templeton Jr. returned as manager and added former Major League Baseball pitcher Onan Masaoka and catcher Dane Sardinha as player coach. Na Koa Ikaika and Hawaii announced they would open their season hosting two three games series against the Ishikawa Million Stars and Shinano Grandserows of the Baseball Challenge League. In late July, the clubs traveled to Japan and played all six members of the BCL as part of their official standings. In Japan, the Stars struggled to a 0–6–1 record. The Stars finished in fourth place and played in the post-season play-in tournament, effectively ending their season.

After finishing the 2013 season with a 26–41–1 record, the team shut down operations due to the travel costs.

== Season-by-season results ==
Hawaii Stars
Season	League	Division	Overall	Win %	Finish	Manager	Playoffs
2012	NABL	North	25–29	.463	3rd	Garry Templeton II	Did not qualify
2013	PACA	—	26–41–1†	.390	4th	Garry Templeton II	Lost round robin (East Bay), (Vallejo) 1–2
Totals			51–70–1	.422	—	—	1–2 (.333)

† 2013 post-season was also included in regular season record.

== Notable alumni ==
- Dane Sardinha (2013)
- Onan Masaoka (2013)
