= Eri Yoshida =

Japanese baseball player

Japan Islanders
- Pitcher
- Born: January 17, 1992 (age 34); Yokohama, Kanagawa, Japan
- Bats: Right Throws: Right
- Stats at Baseball Reference

Eri Yoshida (吉田 えり, Yoshida Eri; born January 17, 1992) is a Japanese professional baseball player for the Japan Islanders of the Empire Professional Baseball League. She plays as a sidearm knuckleball pitcher. In 2008, at the age of 16, she became the first woman drafted by a Japanese men's professional baseball team.

== Baseball career ==
Yoshida was born in Yokohama, where she taught herself how to throw the knuckleball at the age of 14 after watching Major League Baseball pitcher Tim Wakefield on television. She stands 1.55 metres (5 ft 1 in) tall, and her pitches have been clocked at 101 kilometres per hour (63 mph), while her knuckleball pitch velocity measures around 50 mph. As a high school sophomore at Kawasaki-kita Senior High School in Kawasaki, she threw the pitch well enough to earn a place on the school's baseball team. Her success caused a sensation in the national media, who dubbed her the Knuckle Princess. In 2008, she signed a contract to play for the Kobe 9 Cruise of the Kansai Independent Baseball League.

Yoshida made her professional baseball debut at the Osaka Dome in the opening game of the Kansai Independent Baseball League on March 26, 2009, in front of 11,592 fans. She faced two batters, walking the first and striking out the second in a 5–0 win over the Osaka Gold Villicanes. She appeared in 11 games for the Kobe 9 Cruise and moved on after the season to focus on advancing up the pro ranks. She appeared in a one-inning battle against the top hitters of the Hiroshima Carp on November 24, 2009.

On December 15, 2009, the Arizona Winter League announced that they had reached an agreement to allow Yoshida to play in their 35-game season. The league served to showcase players who had been overlooked by major league teams in the draft by giving them a chance to play in front of professional scouts. On February 12, 2010, Yoshida got her first win in Arizona Winter League play, throwing four shut-out innings in a 5–0 win for her team, the Yuma Scorpions, versus Team Canada of the Arizona Winter League.

On February 28, 2010, she was offered a contract to play in the Golden Baseball League, the major independent minor league in western North America, by the Chico Outlaws. The Outlaws were managed by former major league all-star Garry Templeton and the team president and general manager was former Los Angeles Dodgers outfielder Mike Marshall. On March 2, 2010, she trained with Tim Wakefield at the Boston Red Sox minor league training facility.

On April 8, 2010, she signed the contract with the Chico Outlaws and became the first female professional baseball player in the U.S. since the retirement of Ila Borders 10 years previously, and the first ever to play professionally in two countries. Her debut playing for the Chico Outlaws was on May 29, 2010. On Tuesday, July 27, 2010, Yoshida made her first road start against the Victoria Seals of the independent Golden Baseball League in Victoria, British Columbia, making her the first woman in baseball history to pitch professionally in three different countries.

Yoshida was honoured with a spot on Venus Zine's "25 under 25" list of remarkable women for 2009. On August 21, 2010, she was the feature story on FOX Sports' This Week In Baseball, where she was shown meeting her idol, Boston Red Sox pitcher Tim Wakefield.

Yoshida ended the 2010 season with an 0–4 record, but earned praise for her work ethic from team-mates and her manager, Garry Templeton, who noted that any 18-year-old would struggle in the Golden Baseball League.

Yoshida played in the Arizona Winter League, an instructional league, in February 2011 but chose to start the 2011 season with an amateur team from Japan that would be playing in Southern California. She signed a contract with the Chico Outlaws of the professional North American Baseball League in July and pitched a no-decision as her team beat the Edmonton Capitals. She was traded later that week to Maui, rejoining her manager from last year, Garry Templeton, and started on August 9, pitching 5 innings of one-hit ball, and picked up her first professional win in the U.S. with Maui defeating Edmonton 4–1.

In 2012, she returned to Japan to play for the Hyogo Blue Sandars of the Kansai Independent Baseball League. On May 3, 2012, Yoshida made her first start of the year for Hyogo. She hurled five innings, giving up just one run, walking 1 while striking out 2. She earned the win, making her the first woman to win a game in the Kansai Independent League.

In June 2012, Yoshida returned to pitch for Na Koa Ikaika Maui of the North American Baseball League. In her first start on June 9, 2012, she earned the win in a 10–2 victory over the Hawaii Stars. She hurled 7-2/3 innings, giving up only four hits and two runs, as well as walking one batter and striking out another. Yoshida won her next two starts to begin the year with a 3–0 record, but then experienced problems controlling her pitches and lost five games in a row. She ended the season with a record of 4 wins and 6 losses with a 5.56 earned run average.

Yoshida joined the Ishikawa Million Stars in 2013.

Yoshida joined the Tochigi Golden Braves of the Baseball Challenge League in 2017. On October 27, 2017, she became a free agent.

In part due to injuries, in 2017 Yoshida accepted a coaching position with the women's baseball team of the Agekke Corporation. In 2023, she announced plans to return to pitching, in the Empire Professional Baseball League.

== See also ==
- Women in baseball
