= Na Koa Ikaika Maui =

Logo	Cap insignia

Information
- League: Pacific Association (2013)
- Location: Wailuku, Hawaii
- Ballpark: Maehara Stadium (capacity 1,500)
- Founded: 2010
- Disbanded: 2013
- League championships: 1 (PAPB 2013)
- Division championships: 1 (GBL: South Division - 2010)
- Former leagues: North American League (2011–12); Golden Baseball League (2010)
- Colors: Black, green, yellow, red
- Ownership: Hawaii Baseball, LLC
- General manager: David Andrus
- Manager: Jeff Brooks
- Media: The Maui News
- Website: mauiprobaseball.com

Na Koa Ikaika Maui (Hawaiian for The Maui Strong Warriors) were an independent professional baseball team based out of Wailuku, Maui, Hawaii and 2013 champions of the Pacific Association. They played their home games at Maehara Stadium in Wailuku on the island of Maui. Over four seasons, they also played the Golden Baseball League and North American League.

== History ==
=== 2010: Golden Baseball League ===
On December 23, 2009, Michael Cummings, the CEO of XnE, Inc., which founded the team, announced the hiring of former St. George RoadRunners skipper Cory Snyder as the first manager and the signing of 30-year-old GBL veteran Mark Okano. On February 24, the team signed 2009 Golden Baseball League All-Star Fehlandt Lentini. The team's colors were black, green, yellow and red in keeping with the spirit of the islands. They made their 2010 Golden Baseball League debut in an away game, visiting the Victoria Seals on May 21, 2010. In late August, Na Koa Ikaika Maui was acquired by a new ownership group, Hawaii Baseball LLC, based out of Los Angeles that foreclosed as XnE defaulted on a loan that pledged the assets of the team as collateral. Maui went 56–26 in the regular season, winning the South Division. After defeating Calgary in the playoffs, Maui lost to Chico in the finals. On December 16, former Outlaws manager Garry Templeton was announced as their new manager.

=== 2011–2012: North American League ===
In 2011, Na Koa Ikaika joined the North American League and played in the North Division. On August 5, Na Koa Ikaika acquired female pitcher Eri Yoshida. After 69 games and a 29–40 record, it was announced on August 16 that Maui would end their season early.

In 2012, Calgary, Edmonton and Lake County folded in the North Division. Hawaii Baseball LLC, owners of Na Koa Ikaika then started a second franchise, the Hawaii Stars. The San Rafael Pacifics who were new members of the league and North Division also created a second franchise, the Sonoma County Grapes. The four teams traveled to and from Hawaii and California to play each other. On February 16, Na Koa Ikaika announced Jamie Vermilyea as manager. Maui finished the season with 36–30 record, losing to San Rafael in the Northern Division championship series. Shortstop Danny Sandoval led the club with five home runs.

The 2012 season also featured four exhibition games against the Ishikawa Million Stars of the Baseball Challenge League. In July, Na Koa Ikaika hosted the Stars for a two-game series. At the conclusion of the season, Maui flew to Japan and played another two games. Both exhibition series were split. Owner Bob Young, CEO David Andrus and COO Chris Osgood met with the owners of the six Baseball Challenge League teams in hopes of playing official games in 2013.

=== 2013: Pacific Association ===
In 2013, former Arizona Diamondbacks draft pick Jeff Brooks was hired as manager. On January 14, it was announced that Na Koa Ikaika would become a charter member of the Pacific Association along with Hawaii, San Rafael and Sonoma County. Later it would be announced that the Vallejo Admirals would be taking place of the Grapes. Na Koa Ikaika and Hawaii announced they would open their season hosting two three games series against the Ishikawa Million Stars and Shinano Grandserows of the Baseball Challenge League. In late July, the clubs traveled to Japan and played all six members of the BCL as part of their official standings. On August 25, Maui defeated the Vallejo Admirals 8–3 to advance to the championship game vs. the San Rafael Pacifics who they defeated 6–1 that same day.

After finishing the 2013 season with a 47–28 record and championship win, the team shut down operations due to the travel costs.

== Season-by-season results ==
Na Koa Ikaika Maui
Season	League	Division	Overall	Win %	Finish	Manager	Playoffs
2010	GOBL	South	56–26	.683	1st	Cory Snyder	Won South Division championship series (Orange County) 3–2; Lost championship series (Chico) 0–3
2011	NABL	North	29–40	.420	5th	Garry Templeton	Did not qualify
2012	NABL	North	36–30†	.545	2nd	Jamie Vermilyea	Lost North Division championship series (San Rafael) 1–2
2013	PACA	—	47–28†	.627	2nd	Jeff Brooks	Won semifinals (Vallejo); Won championship game (San Rafael)
Totals			168–124	.575	—	—	6–7 (.462)

† 2012 and 2013 post-season was also included in regular season record.

== Notable alumni ==
- Cory Snyder (2010)
- Jerry Spradlin (2010)
- Jamie Vermilyea (2010,2012)
- Eri Yoshida (2011–2013)
- Danny Sandoval (2012)
- Chris Waters (2013)
