= Alfredo Olivares =

Filipino baseball player (born 1991)

- Catcher
- Born: October 31, 1991 (age 34)
- Bats: Right Throws: Right

Teams
- National University (2008–2013); Shinano Grandserows (2014)
Medals
Men's baseball
Representing the Philippines
SEA Games
Gold medal – first place	2011 Jakarta–Palembang	Team

Alfredo Olivares Jr. (born October 31, 1991) is a Filipino baseball player who plays as a catcher. He is the first Filipino player to play in the Japanese minor leagues playing for Shinano Grandserows in 2014. He is also a member of the Philippines national baseball team.

== Early life ==
Alfredo Olivares Jr. was born to Alfredo Sr., a farmer and Zenaida, a vendor. He has 4 other siblings who either plays baseball or softball. At age 11, Olivares was introduced to baseball by his older brother Arnel.

== Career ==
=== Early career ===
Olivares trained for a year in 2005 at the Palayan City High School under coach Francisco Bartolome, who once played in the Philippine Youth Team. He was part of his city's team which won the championship twice in the provincial tournament. He led his province, Nueva Ecija in 2007 at the Nueva Ecija in the Central Luzon Regional Athletic Association which became champions of the tournament. Nueva Ecija also won in 2008.

After Olivares finished his high school studies, he entered the National University in Manila to take up business administration. He was recruited to his university's varsity squad by Joel Palanom and Isaac Bacarisas. In 2011, the National University won the UAAP baseball tournament.

=== Philippine national team ===
In 2011, Wilfredo Hidalgo Jr., Roel Empacis, and Edgardo delos Reyes conducted an open try out for potential players for the Philippine national team. Out of the 100 who tried out, 20 were accepted to the national team including Olivares who was assigned to the second team.

He was part of the squad that won the gold medal at the 2011 Southeast Asian Games. He was named as part of the first Philippine national team that participated at the 2017 World Baseball Classic qualifiers which will take place in February 2016.

=== Shinano Grandserows ===
Olivares is the first Filipino player to play in the Japanese minor leagues, who played for Shinano Grandserows of the Baseball Challenge League in 2014.
