= Shinji Mori =

Japanese baseball player and coach (1974–2017)

- Pitcher / Coach
- Born: September 12, 1974; Iwakuni, Yamaguchi, Japan
- Died: June 28, 2017 (aged 42); Fukuoka, Fukuoka, Japan
- Batted: Left Threw: Right

NPB debut
- April 27, 1997, for the Seibu Lions

Last NPB appearance
- September 28, 2005, for the Seibu Lions

Career statistics
- Win–loss record: 44-44
- Earned run average: 3.39
- Strikeouts: 755
- Saves: 50
- Stats at Baseball Reference

Teams
- As player: Seibu Lions (1997–2005); As coach: Saitama Seibu Lions (2014–2017)

Career highlights and awards
- 5× NPB All-Star (1998, 2000, 2002–2004); 2× Pacific League Best Relief Pitcher Award (2002, 2003); 1× Japan Series champion (2004)

Shinji Mori (Japanese: 森 慎二, September 12, 1974 – June 28, 2017) was a Japanese professional baseball right-handed pitcher. He played in Nippon Professional Baseball (NPB) for the Seibu Lions.

== Career ==
From 1997–2005, he played for the Seibu Lions in Nippon Professional Baseball. After the 2005 season, he was acquired by the Tampa Bay Devil Rays through the posting system. Originally slated to compete for the Devil Ray's closer job during the 2006 MLB season, he tore the labrum in his shoulder and missed the entire season. He was subsequently released by the Devil Rays.

Returning to Japan, in 2009 Mori joined the Ishikawa Million Stars of the semi-pro Baseball Challenge League as a pitcher-coach. After retiring from playing, he took over as the manager of the Million Stars in 2010, staying through the 2014 season. He returned to active duty as a player in 2013, and was the Million Stars' player-manager in 2013–2014.

== Death ==
On June 25, 2017, Mori was hospitalized in Fukuoka Hospital, and after three days, on June 28, Mori died of sepsis caused by infection with streptococcus. He was 42 years old.
