= Masao Kida =

Japanese baseball player (born 1968)

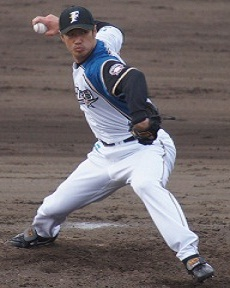
- Kida in 2012
- Pitcher / Manager
- Born: September 12, 1968 (age 58); Kokubunji, Tokyo, Japan
- Batted: Right Threw: Right

Professional debut
- NPB: 1989, for the Yomiuri Giants
- MLB: April 5, 1999, for the Detroit Tigers

Last appearance
- BCL: September 14, 2014, for the Ishikawa Million Stars
- MLB: August 3, 2005, for the Seattle Mariners

NPB statistics (through 2012 season)
- Win–loss: 73-82
- Earned run average: 3.91
- Strikeouts: 1,036

MLB statistics (through 2008 season)
- Win–loss: 1-1
- Earned run average: 5.83
- Strikeouts: 68
- Stats at Baseball Reference

Teams
- As player: Yomiuri Giants (1989–1997); Orix BlueWave (1998); Detroit Tigers (1999–2000); Orix BlueWave (2000–2001); Los Angeles Dodgers (2003–2004); Seattle Mariners (2004–2005); Tokyo Yakult Swallows (2006–2009); Hokkaido Nippon-Ham Fighters (2010–2012); Ishikawa Million Stars (2013–2014); As manager: Hokkaido Nippon-Ham Fighters farm team (2022–2023); As coach: Hokkaido Nippon-Ham Fighters (2019–2020); Hokkaido Nippon-Ham Fighters farm team (2021)

Masao Kida (木田 優夫, Kida Masao; born September 12, 1968) is a Japanese former professional baseball pitcher. He played in Major League Baseball (MLB) from 1999–2000, and 2003–2005. He is currently the manager for the Hokkaido Nippon-Ham Fighters farm team in Nippon Professional Baseball's Eastern League.

== Biography ==
Kida was drafted in the first round in 1987, by the Yomiuri Giants, after graduating from the Nippon University high school. In 1990, he won 12 games, recorded the most strikeouts in his league, and was chosen for the All-Star game. He had surgery on his right elbow in 1997, and was traded to the Orix BlueWave in 1998 in exchange for Takahito Nomura (who would also play in the majors later in his career). Kida made 16 saves that year.

In 1999, he signed with the Detroit Tigers as a free agent, but was demoted to the minors, and he returned to the BlueWave in June, 2000. He was cut in 2001, and spent 2002 in semi-retirement. He joined the Los Angeles Dodgers in 2003, but got into a car accident in March, and was hospitalized (his translator, who was also in the car with him, also suffered serious injuries). He was promoted to the majors in August of the same year, but pitched in only 3 games. In September, 2004, he joined the Seattle Mariners, but only made one appearance in 2005, and was released after the season.

Tokyo Yakult Swallows player-manager Atsuya Furuta invited Kida to play in Japan, and he joined the team in the 2005 off-season. In 2006, he posted a 3.09 ERA in 56 games as a reliever, and played in his second All-Star game, 16 years after his first appearance.

After pitching for the Swallows through the 2009 season, he joined the Hokkaido Nippon-Ham Fighters from 2010 to 2012.

Kida closed out his career in Japan's Baseball Challenge League, pitching for the Ishikawa Million Stars from 2013 to 2014. The Million Stars held a retirement ceremony for Kida on September 14, 2014. He struck out the side, and his uniform number 12 was retired by the team.

== Pitching statistics ==
Nippon Professional Baseball (as of 2012)

- 516 Games
- 73 Wins
- 50 Saves
- 1,036 Strikeouts
- 3.91 ERA
