= Robert Zarate =

Venezuelan baseball player (born 1987)

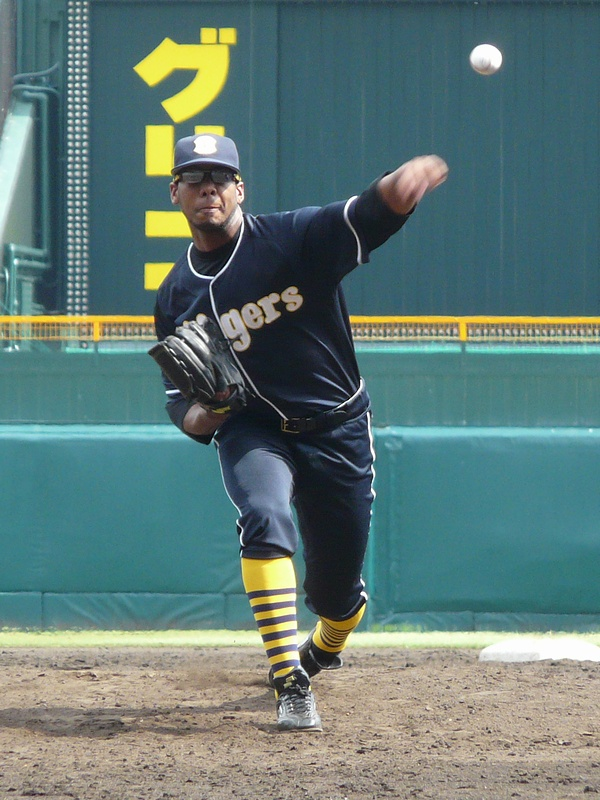
- Zarate with the Hanshin Tigers

Free agent
- Pitcher
- Born: February 1, 1987 (age 39); Valencia, Venezuela
- Bats: Left Throws: Left

NPB debut
- August 5, 2012, for the Hanshin Tigers

NPB statistics (through 2013 season)
- Win–loss record: 0–0
- Earned run average: 7.36
- Strikeouts: 3
- Stats at Baseball Reference

Teams
- Hanshin Tigers (2012–2013)

Robert Alexander Zárate Ladera (born February 1, 1987) is a Venezuelan professional baseball pitcher who is a free agent. From 2012 through 2013, he pitched for the Hanshin Tigers of Nippon Professional Baseball (spending most of both seasons with Hanshin's Western League ni-gun team).

== Career ==
=== Toronto Blue Jays ===
Zárate signed a minor league contract with the Toronto Blue Jays on January 26, 2005. Zárate played for the Blue Jays minor league system through the 2008 season. He began 2009 with the Gulf Coast League Blue Jays. The Blue Jays released Zárate on April 15, 2009.

=== Hanshin Tigers ===
Zárate played for the Hanshin Tigers of Nippon Professional Baseball in 2012. He made his NPB debut on August 5, 2012. He also played the 2013 season for Hanshin before becoming a free agent after the season.

=== Gunma Diamond Pegasus ===
Zárate joined the Gunma Diamond Pegasus of Japan's Baseball Challenge League for the 2014 season. He was scouted by the Rays after spending 2014 with the Pegasus.

=== Tampa Bay Rays ===
On January 21, 2015, Zárate signed a minor league contract with the Tampa Bay Rays that included an invitation to Spring Training. He elected free agency on November 6, 2015.

=== Pittsburgh Pirates ===
On December 7, 2015, Zárate signed a minor league deal with the Pittsburgh Pirates organization that included an invitation to Spring Training. He spent the 2016 season with the Indianapolis Indians before his release on June 13, 2016.

=== Cleveland Indians ===
On January 4, 2018, Zarate signed a minor league contract with an invitation to spring training with the Cleveland Indians. He pitched for the Triple-A Columbus Clippers, appearing in 29 games as a reliever and finishing with a 3-1 record, 3.30 ERA, and 40 strikeouts. Zarate was released by the organization on July 23.

=== Toros de Tijuana ===
On July 27, 2018, Zárate signed with the Toros de Tijuana of the Mexican League.

=== Leones de Yucatán ===
He was traded to the Leones de Yucatán on August 15, 2018. He became a free agent following the season.

On January 28, 2020, Zárate signed with the Rieleros de Aguascalientes of the Mexican League. Zárate did not play in a game in 2020 due to the cancellation of the Mexican League season because of the COVID-19 pandemic. He later became a free agent.
