= Maui Stingrays =

- Logo

Information
- League: Hawaii Winter Baseball (1993–1997)
- Location: Wailuku, Hawaii
- Ballpark: Maehara Stadium
- Founded: 1993
- Disbanded: 1997
- League championships: 2 (1995, 1996)
- Division championships: 2 (1995, 1996)
- Former name: Maui Stingrays (1993–1997)
- Colors: red, black
- General manager: Lane Fujii
- Manager: 1993-Keith Bodie

The Maui Stingrays were a minor league baseball team in the Hawaii Winter Baseball league. They were based in Wailuku, Hawaii. They played their home games at Maehara Stadium.

For the 1994 season, Julie Croteau and Lee Anne Ketcham, teammates with the Colorado Silver Bullets, joined the Stingrays, becoming the first women to play in a Major League Baseball-sanctioned league.

== Team record ==
Season	W	L	Win %	Result
1993	18	32	.360	
1994	30	22	.577	
1995	25	28	.472	league champs
1996	25	24	.510	league champs
1997	25	29	.463	
