= Kazuaki Minami =

Japanese baseball player (born 1981)

- Pitcher
- Born: August 27, 1981 (age 44); Hyōgo, Japan
- Batted: Right Threw: Right

NPB debut
- 2004, for the Yomiuri Giants

Last NPB appearance
- 2004, for the Yomiuri Giants

NPB statistics
- Win–loss record: 0–0
- Earned run average: 9.00
- Strikeouts: 2

Teams
- Yomiuri Giants (2004)

Kazuaki Minami (born August 27, 1981) is a Japanese former professional baseball pitcher. He played two games in Nippon Professional Baseball (NPB) in 2004 for the Yomiuri Giants.

== Career ==
Miami was born in Hyōgo, Japan. Prior to playing professionally, he attended Shinko Gakuen High School and then Fukui Kogyo University.

Minami made two relief appearances for the Yomiuri Giants of Nippon Professional Baseball in 2004, pitching two innings, allowing four hits and no walks, while striking out two batters. His ERA was 9.00. After spending a couple years in ni-gun (Japanese minor league baseball), he joined the Calgary Vipers of the Northern League in 2007. In 24 games (17 starts), he went 10–5 with a 5.52 ERA, pitching 122 1/3 innings, allowing 173 hits and 38 walks, and striking out 78 batters.

Following his year with Calgary, Minami went to pitch with Ishikawa Million Stars in the Baseball Challenge League in Japan.
