= Mike Marshall (outfielder) =

American baseball player (born 1960)

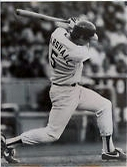
- Marshall batting for the Dodgers in 1984
- Right fielder
- Born: January 12, 1960 (age 66); Libertyville, Illinois, U.S.
- Batted: Right Threw: Right

Professional debut
- MLB: September 7, 1981, for the Los Angeles Dodgers
- NPB: 1992, for the Nippon Ham Fighters

Last appearance
- MLB: August 4, 1991, for the California Angels
- NPB: 1992, for the Nippon Ham Fighters

MLB statistics
- Batting average: .270
- Home runs: 148
- Runs batted in: 530

NPB statistics
- Batting average: .246
- Home runs: 9
- Runs batted in: 26
- Stats at Baseball Reference

Teams
- Los Angeles Dodgers (1981–1989); New York Mets (1990); Boston Red Sox (1990–1991); California Angels (1991); Nippon Ham Fighters (1992)

Career highlights and awards
- All-Star (1984); World Series champion (1988)

Michael Allen Marshall (born January 12, 1960), nicknamed "Moose", is an American former professional baseball player. He played as an outfielder in Major League Baseball from 1981 to 1991, most notably as a member of the Los Angeles Dodgers with whom he was named an All-Star player and won a world championship in 1988. He also played for the New York Mets, Boston Red Sox and the California Angels. After his major league career, he played one season in Nippon Professional Baseball for the Nippon Ham Fighters in 1992. Marshall served as president and general manager of the Chico Outlaws of the North American League. In 2013, Marshall was the commissioner of the Pacific Association.

== Playing career ==
Born in Libertyville, Illinois, Marshall showed considerable promise as a minor league player. He had 24 home runs and 22 steals for the Class-A level Lodi Dodgers in the California League in 1979. He won the league's Triple Crown in 1981, when he hit .373 with 34 homers, 21 stolen bases, and 137 RBIs for the Albuquerque Dukes, a Triple A club in the Pacific Coast League.

He is one of only two LA Dodger minor leaguers to have two 20/20 minor league seasons. (Joc Pederson did it in 2013 and 2014.)

He was elected to the National League All-Star team in 1984. He had perhaps his best season in 1985, when he hit .293 and set career highs with 28 home runs, 95 runs batted in, 72 runs scored, and 267 total bases.

Marshall has two World Series rings from the Dodgers' 1981 and 1988 World Series wins in which he hit a homer in Game 2.

=== International & Independent ===
In 1992, Marshall played with the Nippon Ham Fighters of the Nippon Professional Baseball . In 67 appearances, Marshall batted .246 with nine home runs and 15 doubles. In 1999, Marshall signed with the Schaumburg Flyers of the Northern League. Over 33 games, Marshall held a .307 average with 11 extra base hits and 21 RBIs.

== Career statistics ==
Years	Games	PA	AB	R	H	2B	3B	HR	RBI	BB	SO	AVG	OBP	SLG	FLG%
11	1035	3908	3593	433	971	173	8	148	530	247	810	.270	.321	.446	.986

In the postseason, in 26 games, he batted .212 (18-for-85) with 7 runs, 3 home runs and 13 RBI.

== Managerial and front office career ==
Marshall began his coaching career as the hitting coach for Glendale CC from (1993–1994) and Texas State (1995–1997). Marshall's first managerial experience came with the Albany-Colonie Diamond Dogs of the Northern League from (2000–2002). Marshall then managed the El Paso Diablos from (2005–2006) while also being the hitting coach at El Paso CC. He was the field manager, team president, and general manager of the Yuma Scorpions, of the Golden Baseball League from (2007–2008). After working as manager and team president of the Chico Outlaws during the 2010 and 2011 seasons, Marshall was named as field manager and vice president of baseball operations for the San Rafael Pacifics club for the 2012 campaign. Marshall won the North Division championship, defeating Maui Na Koa Ikaika in the championship series. In January 2013, Marshall was named commissioner of the newly formed Pacific Association. In 2014, Marshall was named manager of the Fort Worth Cats of the United Baseball League. In middle of July, Marshall resigned. On December 3, 2014, Marshall was announced as the associate head coach at New Mexico Highlands.

=== Managerial record ===
Team	Year	Regular season					Postseason			
Team	Year	Games	Won	Lost	Win %	Finish	Won	Lost	Win %	Result
ALB	2000	83	45	38	.542	4th	–	–	–	–
ALB	2001	91	50	41	.549	2nd	0	3	.000	Lost East semi-final (NJ)
ALB	2002	89	46	43	.517	5th	–	–	–	–
ALB total		263	141	122	.469		0	3	.000	
EP	2005	94	44	50	.468	6th	–	–	–	–
EP	2006	23	8	15	.348	Replaced	–	–	–	–
EP total		117	52	65	.444		–	–	–	
YUM	2007	76	42	34	.553	3rd	–	–	–	–
YUM	2008	88	48	40	.545	3rd	–	–	–	–
YUM total		164	90	74	.549		–	–	–	
CHC	2011	88	41	47	.466	5th	–	–	–	–
CHC total		88	41	47	.466		–	–	–	
SRF	2012	60	34	26	.567	2nd	2	1	.667	Won North Finals (MAUI)
SRF total		60	34	26	.567		2	1	.667	
FW	2014	50	27	23	.540	Resigned	–	–	–	–
FW total		50	27	23	.540		–	–	–	
Total		742	385	357	.519		2	4	.333	

== Personal life ==
Marshall attended Buffalo Grove High School.

Marshall briefly dated Belinda Carlisle of the pop band the Go-Go's.

Marshall and his wife, Mary, and have two children, Michael Allen Marshall Jr. and Marcheta Kay (Marshall) Schroeder; both graduated from Stanford University.
