= Ben Johnson (outfielder) =

American baseball player (born 1981)

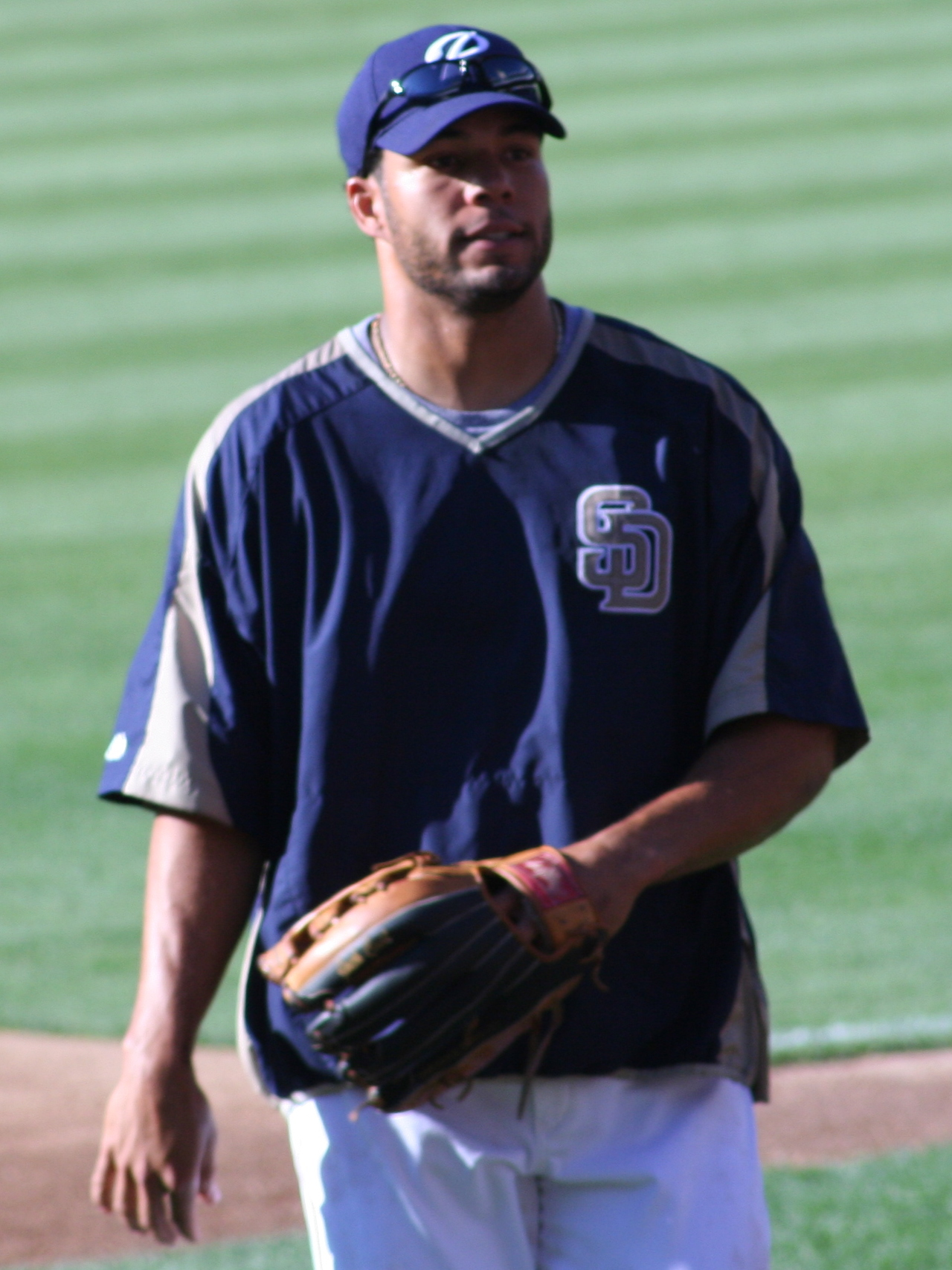
- Johnson with the San Diego Padres in 2006
- Outfielder / Manager
- Born: June 18, 1981 (age 45); Memphis, Tennessee, U.S.
- Batted: Right Threw: Right

MLB debut
- June 26, 2005, for the San Diego Padres

Last MLB appearance
- June 10, 2007, for the New York Mets

MLB statistics
- Batting average: .230
- Home runs: 7
- Runs batted in: 26
- Stats at Baseball Reference

Teams
- San Diego Padres (2005–2006); New York Mets (2007)

Benjamin Joseph Johnson (born June 18, 1981) is an American professional baseball manager and former outfielder. He played in Major League Baseball (MLB) for the San Diego Padres and New York Mets. He is currently the manager of the Memphis Redbirds.

== Professional career ==
He was a 4th-round draft pick in 1999 MLB draft by the St. Louis Cardinals and was traded the following year to the San Diego Padres, along with Heathcliff Slocumb for Carlos Hernández and minor leaguer Nathan Tebbs.

He worked his way up to Triple-A in 2005, where he was an All-Star outfielder and the San Diego Padres Minor League Player of the Year, hitting .312 with 25 home runs. He was brought up to the majors that year and received limited playing time with the Padres, hitting .213 in 75 at-bats, and .250 with 4 home runs in 120 at-bats in 2006.

He was not selected for San Diego's 2006 playoff roster, and after the season ended he was traded to the New York Mets with relief pitcher Jon Adkins in exchange for relievers Heath Bell and Royce Ring.

During the beginning of his time with the Mets, Johnson was shuttled up and down between New York and Triple-A New Orleans. During June, he received some playing time when all three Mets regular outfielders (Shawn Green, Carlos Beltrán, and Moisés Alou) were injured.

Johnson was not offered a new contract by the Mets and became a free agent on December 12, 2007. However, the Mets brought Johnson back by signing him to a minor league deal on February 14, 2008, and invited him to spring training. Johnson was released by the Mets in early May 2008. In 2009, Johnson attempted a comeback from multiple injuries with the Orange County Flyers of the Golden Baseball League.

== Coaching career ==
Johnson made his professional managerial debut with the Arizona/Goodyear Centennials of the Freedom Pro Baseball League in 2012. He is formerly a coach with the Durham Bulls, the AAA affiliate of the Tampa Bay Rays.

In 2019, Johnson was named manager of the Memphis Redbirds.
