= Eiji Kanamori =

Japanese baseball player and coach (born 1957)

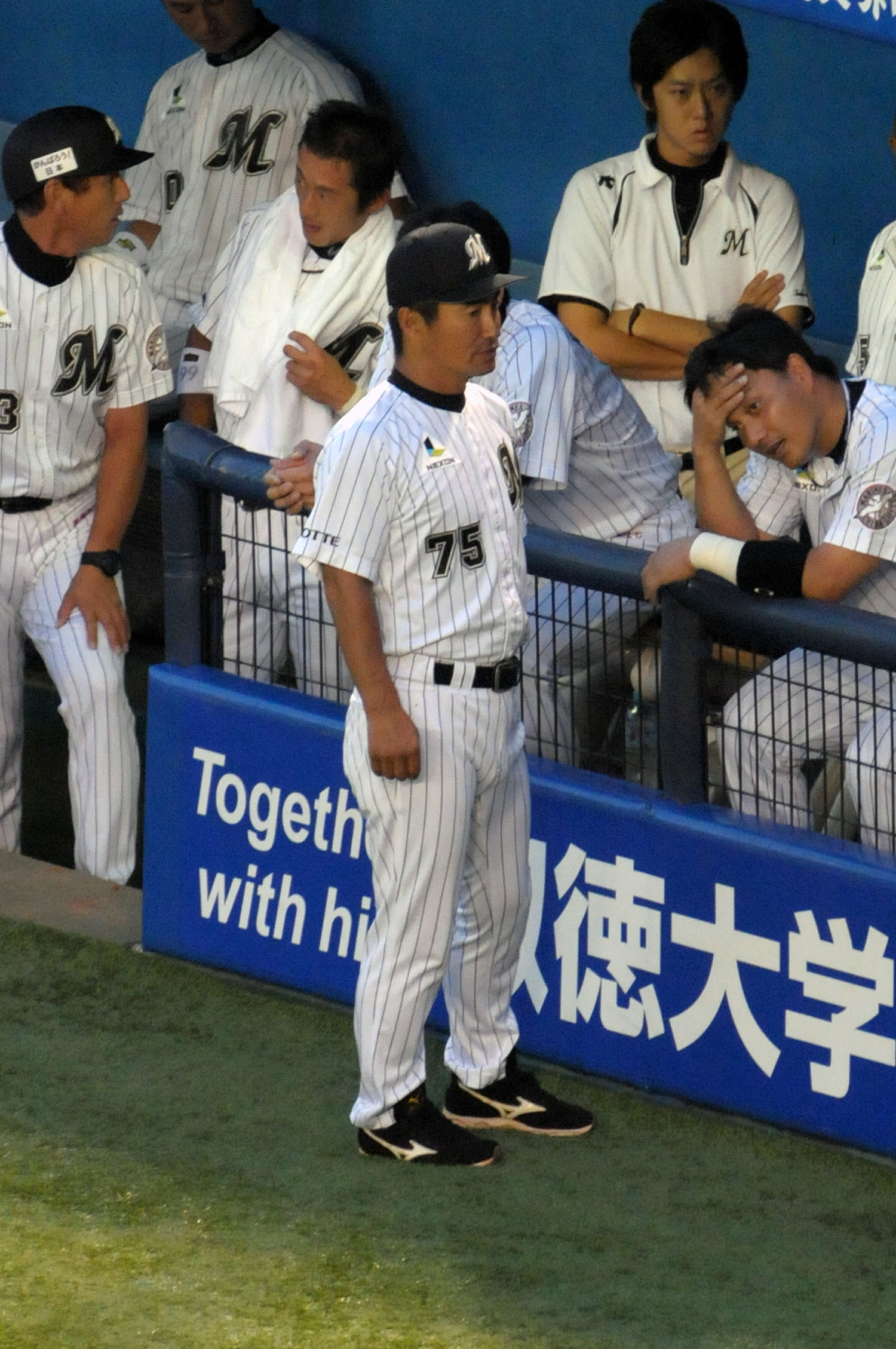
- Outfielder / Coach
- Born: January 24, 1957 (age 69); Kanazawa, Ishikawa, Japan
- Batted: Left Threw: Right

NPB debut
- September 9, 1982, for the Seibu Lions

Last NPB appearance
- October 9, 1996, for the Yakult Swallows

NPB statistics (through 1996 season)
- Batting average: .270
- Hits: 583
- RBIs: 239
- Stolen bases: 11
- Stats at Baseball Reference

Teams
- As player: Seibu Lions (1982–1988); Hanshin Tigers (1988–1992); Yakult Swallows (1993–1996); As manager: Ishikawa Million Stars (2007–2009); As coach: Yakult Swallows (1997–2000); Seibu Lions (2001–2002); Hanshin Tigers (2004); Fukuoka SoftBank Hawks (2005–2006); Chiba Lotte Marines (2010–2012, (2018); Tohoku Rakuten Golden Eagles (2019–2022)

Career highlights and awards
- 1× Pacific League Golden Glove Award (1985); 1× Best Nine Award (1985)
- Last updated on: December 26, 2018

Eiji Kanamori (金森 栄治, Kanamori Eiji; born January 24, 1957) is a former Nippon Professional Baseball outfielder and the current coach of the Tohoku Rakuten Golden Eagles.
