= Kansai Independent Baseball League =

- Most recent season or competition: 2013
- Sport: Baseball
- Founded: 2008
- First season: 2009
- Folded: 2013
- No. of teams: 3
- Country: Japan
- Last champion: 06BULLS
- Most titles: Osaka Gold Villicanes (1); Kobe 9 Cruise (1); Hyogo Blue Sandars (1); 06BULLS (1)
- Website: KIBL Official site

The Kansai Independent Baseball League (関西独立リーグ, Kansai Dokuritsu Rīgu) (nicknamed KANDOK) was a professional baseball league in Japan which operated from 2009–2013. The league made history on March 26, 2009, when pitcher Eri Yoshida made her debut as the first female in an otherwise all-male league.

== History ==
The league's activities became public in 2008. Plans to form the league were announced at a press conference on March 6, 2008. On July 30, 2008, the names of the four teams were released:

- Osaka Gold Villicanes
- Kobe 9 Cruise
- Harima (later changed to Akashi Red Soldiers)
- Wakayama (later changed to Kishu Rangers)

The league held its first draft on November 16, 2008. The Kobe 9 Cruise made history, selecting 16-year-old Eri Yoshida to be the first female in an otherwise all-male league. Yoshida made her professional debut at the Osaka Dome in the opening game of the KIBL on March 26, 2009, before 11,592 fans. Yoshida faced two batters, walking the first and striking-out the second in a 5-0 win over the Osaka Gold Villicanes.

The first league champion, the Osaka Gold Villicanes, left KANDOK after the first season, seceding to the Japan Future Baseball League. A new team, Seoul Haechi, was created to fill their spot.

Following the model of the Osaka Gold Villicanes, the second league champion, the Kobe 9 Cruise, seceded from KANDOK after the 2010 season, while the Akashi Red Soldiers went defunct. The league added three new teams, the Hyogo Blue Sandars, the Kobe Suns, and the Osaka Hawks Dream. The league now had five teams.

The Osaka Hawks Dream seceded after the 2011 season and Seoul Haechi went defunct, reducing the league to three teams. To fill the void, the Yamato Samurai Reds and the 06BULLS were created in time for the 2012 season.

The Kobe Suns and Yamato Samurai Reds both went defunct after the 2012 season.

In its final season the league had three teams, the Kishu Rangers, the Hyogo Blue Sandars, and the 06BULLS, with the Rangers being the only team which lasted for the duration of the league.

== Teams ==
| Team | First season | Final season | City | Stadium | Team color | Notes |
|---|---|---|---|---|---|---|
| Kishu Rangers | 2009 | 2013 | Wakayama, Wakayama | Wakayama Prefectural Kimiidera Baseball Stadium | | |
| Hyogo Blue Sandars | 2011 | 2013 | Sanda, Hyōgo | Kippi Stadium | | |
| 06BULLS | 2012 | 2013 | Higashiōsaka, Osaka | Hanazono Central Stadium | | |
| Akashi Red Soldiers | 2009 | 2010 | Akashi, Hyōgo | Akashi Park | | Defunct |
| Seoul Haechi | 2010 | 2011 | Wakayama | | | Defunct |
| Kobe Suns | 2011 | 2012 | Kobe and Awaji Island, Hyōgo | Sumoto Municipal Stadium | | Defunct |
| Yamato Samurai Reds | 2012 | 2012 | Nara | Nara Prefectural Kashihara Oyakesono baseball field | | Defunct |
| Osaka Gold Villicanes | 2009 | 2009 | Osaka, Osaka | Suminoekoen Stadium | | Seceded |
| Kobe 9 Cruise | 2009 | 2010 | Kobe, Hyōgo | Skymark Stadium | | Seceded |
| Osaka Hawks Dream | 2011 | 2011 | Osaka | Suminoekoen Stadium | | Seceded |

== Championship history ==
| Year | Winner |
|---|---|
| 2009 | Osaka Gold Villicanes |
| 2010 | Kobe 9 Cruise |
| 2011 | Hyogo Blue Sandars |
| 2012 | 06BULLS |
