= Julie Croteau =

American baseball player

- First basewoman
- Born: December 4, 1970 (age 54); Prince William County, Virginia, U.S.
- Bats: Left Throws: Left

Teams
- Colorado Silver Bullets (1994); Maui Stingrays (1994)

Career highlights and awards
- First woman to play men's NCAA baseball

Julie Croteau (born December 4, 1970) is an American former college and professional baseball player. She is recognized as the first woman to regularly play men's National Collegiate Athletic Association (NCAA) baseball, as well as the first woman to coach men's NCAA Division I baseball and one of the first women to play in a Major League Baseball-sanctioned league.

Croteau attended Osbourn Park High School in Manassas, Virginia, where she and her parents filed a sex discrimination lawsuit against the school to play baseball on the men's team, which she lost. In college, Croteau, a first basewoman, had a .222 batting average her freshman year as the St. Mary's College of Maryland Seahawks finished with a 1–20–1 win–loss–tie record. In 1994, she played for the all-women Colorado Silver Bullets in their inaugural season, where she batted .078 against semi-professional male competition; after the year, she played for the Maui Stingrays of the Hawaii Winter Baseball league. Her baseball glove and photo are on display at the National Baseball Hall of Fame and Museum in Cooperstown, New York. As of 2024, Croteau was on the staff of Stanford University.

== Playing and coaching career ==
Julie Croteau was born in Prince William County, Virginia, (Note: According to the Colorado Silver Bullets, Croteau was born in Berkeley, California.) on December 4, 1970, to Nancy and Ray Croteau, both lawyers. Growing up, Croteau played tee-ball and Little League Baseball, and as she got older she played in the Babe Ruth League and in Major League baseball (a youth league). Croteau watched her first baseball game at Fenway Park, home of the Boston Red Sox. She attended Osbourn Park High School in Manassas, Virginia, where she tried out for the junior varsity and varsity baseball teams; she made the junior varsity team as a bench player during her ninth-grade year, but never made the varsity team. In 1988, Croteau and her parents filed a sex discrimination lawsuit against the high school for the ability to play on the boys' team, but lost. The court ruled that she had "received a fair tryout and that the decision to cut her was made in good faith and for reasons unrelated to gender".

Mike Zitz, manager of the semi-professional Fredericksburg Giants baseball team of the Virginia Baseball League, invited her to try out for the team. She made the team and played several seasons of semi-professional baseball for them. In her first season with the Giants, she was hit frequently with pitches. At St. Mary's College of Maryland, she made the men's baseball team as a freshman walk on. In her debut for the Seahawks, Croteau, who played first base, went 0 for 3 with two groundouts against the Spring Garden College Bobcats as the Seahawks lost 4–1. Defensively, she committed no errors on six attempts. In making her debut, she is credited as becoming the second woman to play in a National Collegiate Athletic Association (NCAA) college baseball game. (Note: Though an article in Society for American Baseball Research 50 at 50 credits Susan Perabo with playing for Webster University (Division III) in 1985, the article still cites Croteau as being "the first woman to play [NCAA] baseball".) (Note: According to an NCAA spokesperson, women might have played college baseball during World War II.) Cameras from NBC and Cable News Network attended the game. Croteau finished the season with a .222 batting average as the team finished with a 1–20–1 win–loss–tie record. She would later quit the team her junior year due to sexual harassment and sexism from teammates and the athletic department. She finished her collegiate career batting .171 over 76 at bats. After playing as an undergraduate, Croteau attended graduate school at Smith College and continued her career by coaching men's NCAA baseball at Western New England University (Division III) as an assistant in 1993 and then at the University of Massachusetts Amherst (Umass; Division I), also as an assistant, from 1995 to 1996. Her tenure at Umass made her the first woman to coach an NCAA Division I school for baseball.

=== Professional baseball ===
"I remember when I left the courthouse and I was really upset, because I didn't feel like justice had been served. Now I feel like it's poetic justice: I'm playing professional baseball, and I don't think any of those other guys are."

— Croteau on playing with the Silver Bullets

In 1994, Croteau played with the Colorado Silver Bullets, a women's professional baseball team that played against semi-professional men, in its inaugural season. There, she batted .078, with four hits and two runs batted in over 51 at bats. On defense, Croteau had a fielding percentage of .989 with two errors and a team-high 174 putouts. She had thirteen walks compared to nine strikeouts, one of only two players on the team with more walks than strikeouts, as the Silver Bullets finished with a 6–38 record. When she played for Colorado, Croteau stood at 5 feet 8 inches (173 cm) and weighed 130 pounds (59 kg). After one season, she and teammate Lee Anne Ketcham joined the Maui Stingrays of the Hawaii Winter Baseball league for their 1994 season, becoming the first women to play in a Major League Baseball-sanctioned league.

=== USA Baseball ===
In 2004, Croteau was selected to be the third base coach for the United States women's national baseball team, which captured the gold medal at the 2004 Women's Baseball World Cup in Edmonton. In 2006, Croteau was promoted to become the manager of the women's national team which won the Women's World Cup in Taiwan. She became the first woman to manage a women's baseball team to the gold medal in any international baseball competition.

== Personal life ==
Julie Croteau graduated from St. Mary's College of Maryland with a Bachelor of Arts degree. Her collegiate baseball glove and photo are on display at the National Baseball Hall of Fame and Museum in Cooperstown, New York.

In the 1992 Columbia Pictures film A League of Their Own, Croteau served as a baseball double for actress Anne Ramsay, who portrayed first basewoman Helen Haley.

In 1997, she broadcast Pacific-10 conference baseball games, and "became the first woman hired to broadcast a National Basketball Association" game, according to author Paula Edelson. In 2017, she received the President's Trailblazer award from St. Mary's College of Maryland. As of 2017, Croteau was married, had two children and lived in the San Francisco Bay Area. As of 2022, she works as director of communications in the human relations department at Stanford University.

== See also ==
- Women in baseball
