= East Bay Lumberjacks =

Baseball team in California, USA

Information
- League: San Francisco Money League (Pro Division)
- Location: Concord, California
- Ballpark: Ygnacio Valley High School
- Founded: 2013
- League championships: 2014-15
- Division championships: 2014-15
- Former name: BayCal Lumberjacks
- Former league: Pacific Association
- Former ballpark: Wilson Park
- Colors: Dark Green, Black, Silver, White
- Manager: Roland Nazar
- Website: www.golumberjacks.com

The East Bay Lumberjacks were an independent professional baseball team based out of Concord, California.

== History ==
=== Early years ===
In 2009, Tom Macari and Scott Price created the East Bay Lumberjacks. The Lumberjacks played in various semi-professional leagues from 2009–2012. In 2012, the Lumberjacks faced their first professional opponent in a spring training exhibition game against the San Rafael Pacifics of the North American League. At the time, the club had nine former affiliated players as well as former Major League Baseball pitcher Wayne Franklin. In August, they played the Sonoma County Grapes in another exhibition game while the other remaining teams in the North Division were playing games in Hawaii.

=== 2013: Pacific Association ===
On February 6, 2013, it was announced the Lumberjacks would be playing against Hawaii, Maui, San Rafael and Vallejo of the newly formed Pacific Association. They were slated to play in an abbreviated 15 game season of inter-league play. They played their home games at Laney College in Oakland and were managed by Roland Nazar. On June 7, they made their regular season debut against San Rafael where they were defeated. After four regular season games, the Lumberjacks played an exhibition series against the Humboldt Crabs of the Far West League. East Bay then traveled to Hawaii where they played six regular season games against the Stars and Na Koa Ikaika. On June 21, the Lumberjacks defeated Na Koa Ikaika 6–5, earning them their first professional victory.

In early July, Vallejo cancelled their trip to Hawaii, creating a vacancy in the schedule. On July 5, the Pacific Association announced the admission of the East Bay Lumberjacks as a full league member. The admission meant another nine regular season games in Hawaii along with post-season eligibility. To assist with travel costs, the Lumberjacks traveled to Hawaii with limited players. The remaining roster was made up of former local collegiate and North American League players.

On August 13, the East Bay Lumberjacks rebranded to the Bay Cal Lumberjacks. The Lumberjacks finished in fifth place and played in the post-season play-in tournament, effectively ending their season. After finishing the 2013 season with a 7–30 record, the team did not return for the 2014 season. They were replaced in the league by the Pittsburg Mettle, who were co-owned by Macari and Franklin.

=== Later years ===
In the winter of 2014, the Lumberjacks rejoined the semi-professional ranks in a four-team San Francisco Money League, where they played from November to February. Finishing 7–1 in the regular season, the Lumberjacks defeated Castro Valley Braves in a best-of 3 championship series.

== Season-by-season results ==
East Bay Lumberjacks
Year	Regular Season			Postseason		
Year	Record	Win %	Finish	Record	Win %	Result
2013	7–30†	.189	5th of 5	0–3	.000	Lost play-in to (HI, VAL)
Totals	7–30	.189		0–3	.000	

† 2013 post-season was also included in regular season record.
