= Colorado Silver Bullets =

Defunct American professional baseball team

The Colorado Silver Bullets were an all-female professional baseball team that played in the United States from 1994 to 1997. The Bullets were the first such team since the folding of the All-American Girls Professional Baseball League in 1954.

== History ==
=== Founding ===
The team was owned by Hope Beckham Inc. a partnership consisting of Paul Beckham and Bob Hope in Atlanta, Georgia. Back in the 1980s, Bob Hope, a former Atlanta Braves executive and the owner of an Atlanta public relations firm, had tried to field a women's minor league team called the Sun Sox. He organized and held tryouts for the team, but the minor league system would not allow them into any league. Hope then decided to put together a team outside of professionally organized baseball and secured about $2 million dollars in sponsorship from Coors Brewing Company. (The team was named after its sponsor as Coors Light calls itself the "silver bullet" of beers.) With future Hall-of-Famer Phil Niekro on board as the manager, the Silver Bullets held tryouts across the country.

Most of the players were top college softball players. Many had played some baseball as young girls, but most had been excluded from playing past the age of twelve. Lee Ann Ketcham played baseball right through high school in Alabama but switched to softball for college. Julie Croteau went to court to play baseball at her high school in Virginia and lost, but went on to become the first woman to play and eventually to coach baseball at the college level.

Their coaches were former major leaguers, including Joe Pignatano, Joe Niekro, Johnny Grubb, Al Bumbry and their manager, Phil Niekro, who was inducted into the National Baseball Hall of Fame in 1997, surrounded by his new team.

=== Play ===
The Silver Bullets played 44 games during their first season, and 195 games over a four-year period from 1994 to 1997 by barnstorming the country playing men's all-star amateur and semi-pro teams. Among their opponents were the Navy Mariners, an all-star team of players stationed at United States Navy bases, and the Hollywood Star Sox, a team of actors and other entertainment industry professionals captained by Jonathan Silverman. (Those games were played at, respectively, Robert F. Kennedy Stadium in Washington, D.C., and the Epicenter in Rancho Cucamonga, California.) Some of the team's games were televised live across the U.S. on Prime Sports, now Fox Sports Net.

In their first two seasons, the Bullets didn't win a lot of games, though their record did improve; it was not until their fourth and final season that they managed a winning record. The team established a base in Albany, Georgia, and played about 20 games a year at Paul Eames Sports Complex for two seasons, starting in 1995.

After four seasons, the Bullets folded in 1997 when Coors Brewing Company decided not to continue with their sponsorship. Despite much effort the team was unable to secure alternate funding and had to disband.

=== Legacy ===
The Silver Bullets broke a lot of new ground and have been recognized by Cooperstown. After the 1994 season, Lee Anne Ketcham and Julie Croteau became the first women to sign with the Class A and AA men's Hawaii Winter Baseball league. The next spring, as the 1994 baseball strike remained unresolved and MLB teams attempted to find replacement players, the New York Mets brought infielder Shannan Mitchem and pitcher Ann Williams to spring training for a tryout, although both were released soon afterward. In 1996, four players hit home runs and Pam Davis, in a guest appearance with the AA Jacksonville Suns, pitched a scoreless inning of relief against the Australian Olympic men's team. In 1997, Jenny Dalton, Toni Heisler and Tamara Holmes hit over .300 and the team dramatically won their final game to finish with a record of 23–22, for their first winning season. Phil Niekro described that final game as being as exciting as a World Series game.

== See also ==
- Women's baseball
- Women in baseball
