= Jamie Vermilyea =

American baseball player and coach (born 1982)

- Pitcher
- Born: February 10, 1982 (age 44); Tucson, Arizona, U.S.
- Batted: Right Threw: Right

MLB debut
- April 22, 2007, for the Toronto Blue Jays

Last MLB appearance
- May 10, 2007, for the Toronto Blue Jays

MLB statistics
- Win–loss record: 0–0
- Earned run average: 0.00
- Strikeouts: 2
- Stats at Baseball Reference

Teams
- Toronto Blue Jays (2007)

James Jordan Vermilyea (born February 10, 1982) is an American former professional baseball pitcher, and is currently the pitching coach for the Tennessee Smokies. He played part of the 2007 season in Major League Baseball for the Toronto Blue Jays, and most recently played for the Winnipeg Goldeyes of the American Association. He is 6'4" tall and 195 lb (88 kg) in weight.

== Amateur career ==
Vermilyea played college baseball for the University of New Mexico. In 2002, he played collegiate summer baseball in the Cape Cod Baseball League for the Yarmouth-Dennis Red Sox, where he went a stretch of 13 games without allowing an earned run, and was named a league all-star.

== Professional career ==
Vermilyea was drafted by the Toronto Blue Jays in the 9th round, 260th overall of the 2003 amateur draft. In three seasons for the Blue Jays minor league system, Vermilyea posted a 19–9 record with eight saves and a 3.05 ERA in 99 games, 22 as a starter. Most impressively, he threw a perfect game against the New Britain Rock Cats on June 28, 2004.

Vermilyea was acquired by the Boston Red Sox in the Rule 5 Draft from Toronto, but was returned to Toronto on March 14, 2006. He split the 2006 season with Toronto's minor-league affiliates New Hampshire Fisher Cats (Double-A/Eastern League) and Syracuse Chiefs (Triple A/International League).

In April 2007, Vermilyea's contract was purchased from Syracuse by the Blue Jays after B. J. Ryan went on the 15-day disabled list and Davis Romero went on the 60-day disabled list. He made his major league debut on April 22 against the Baltimore Orioles, pitching 3 scoreless innings as a reliever.

Vermilyea began the 2008 season back with the Fisher Cats, but was released by the Blue Jays on June 27. He played in Serie A1 in 2009 for Bbc Grosseto.

In 2010, he signed with the Na Koa Ikaika Maui of the Golden Baseball League. As their closer he posted a 1–2 record with 20 saves (just one short of the league record) with an ERA of 1.64 in 31 games with 28 strikeouts. He led his team to the first half championship, but on August 28, 2010, his contract was purchased by the Blue Jays, preventing him from participating in the postseason or setting the GBL saves record. He was assigned to Triple-A Las Vegas the following day. He appeared in four games for Las Vegas, then became a minor league free agent at the end of the season.

On April 29, 2011, Vermilyea signed with the Winnipeg Goldeyes of the American Association of Independent Professional Baseball. He served as the Goldeyes' closer, appeared in 45 games with a record of 3–3, an ERA of 1.81, and 17 saves.

== Scouting report ==
Vermilyea can throw his fastball in the lower 90 miles per hour speed range. His fastball has good command, and good movement. Vermilyea also utilized his ability to throw a low 80's mph breaking slider, a splitter, a curveball, a change-up, and a cutter. Vermilyea struggles with consistency in his pitches.

== Coaching career ==
On February 16, 2012, Na Koa Ikaika Maui hired Vermilyea as manager. After a stint as pitching coach of the Winnipeg Goldeyes, he was hired by the Chicago Cubs to be a minor league coach for the 2019 season. In 2025, he was named pitching coach for the Knoxville Smokies the Double-A affiliate of the Chicago Cubs. In 2026, he was named as an assistant pitching coach for the Iowa Cubs the Triple-A affiliate of the Chicago Cubs.

== See also ==
- Rule 5 draft results
