= Ichiro Maehara =

American baseball player

Ichiro "Iron" Maehara (November 14, 1909 – April 6, 1998), was a noted Hawaiian baseball player who played semipro ball and exhibition games against military teams and major leaguers when they came to Hawaii. He played in Hawaii from the 1930s through the 1950s. In later years Red Adams got him a contract as a scout with the Los Angeles Dodgers. Maehara's top discovery was Sid Fernandez.

A baseball stadium on Maui has been named Maehara Stadium.

== Youth ==
During Maehara's youth, virtually every community in the Islands had a company team. Maehara caught on with the HC&S sugarcane plantation team and soon became well known. When he was a boy he loved watching an old-time movie serial called "The Iron Claw." The nickname stuck with him for life. As he matured, he coached Island kids and the younger players on the Hawaiian Commercial & Sugar Company (HC&S). In the early '40s he was hospitalized with tuberculosis. While recovering wrote weekly columns for The Maui News called "Diamond Dopester." After he recovered, he continued feeding baseball info to the regular columnists. During World War II, while Japanese-Americans were closely monitored, Maehara played against military teams. There he met Phil Rizzuto. After the war, he befriended other major leaguers.

== Scout ==
In the mid-1960s Maehara impressed Dodger scout Red Adams with his baseball expertise and Adams suggested Iron become a bird-dog, or free lance, scout for the Dodgers. Over the years, he sent many an Island lad to the mainland, including his biggest find, Sid Fernandez. When the Dodgers signed Fernandez out of high school, Maehara became a full-time scout and he remained on the payroll until 1997, when he retired at the age of 87.

== Little League ==
Maehara was also instrumental in organizing Little League ball on Maui and Lanai. Maehara eventually became director of Maui County Parks and from 1971 to 1973 was responsible for developing a popular ballpark in Hawaii as part of the War Memorial Complex. In 1997, in honor of a lifetime dedicated to Island baseball, that park was renamed Ichiro "Iron" Maehara Baseball Stadium.

In 1998, just as the major league season was starting, Maehara died at 88. In the Kahului church where the funeral was held, the community turned out to pay their respects. Fred Claire, Dodger general manager from 1987 to 1998, summed up the life of Iron Maehara neatly when he said, "We will miss him greatly. He was a special person as a scout and as a human being. You simply don't replace a man like Iron."
