= 2011 North American League season =

2011 NAL season
- League: North American League
- Sport: Baseball
- Duration: May 25, 2011 – August 28, 2011

Regular season
- Season champions: Edmonton Capitals

League postseason
- Northern Division champions: Edmonton Capitals
- Northern Division runners-up: Calgary Vipers
- Southern Division champions: San Angelo Colts
- Southern Division runners-up: Rio Grande Valley WhiteWings

NAL Championship Series
- Champions: Edmonton Capitals
- Runners-up: Rio Grande Valley WhiteWings

NAL seasons
- 2012 North American League season →

The 2011 North American League season was the inaugural season of the North American League, after three previous independent baseball leagues in the Golden Baseball League, United Baseball League and the Northern League merged to form the NAL. The NAL was set for 12 teams in 2011, however only played with 10. The Henderson Roadrunners never played as Norse Field wasn’t ready in time for the 2011 season.

== Season schedule ==
The 10 teams in the league were split evenly between two divisions, North and South. The top two teams in each division would qualify for the 2011 playoffs.

== Regular season standings ==
as of August 28, 2011

North Division Regular Season Standings
Pos	Team	G	W	L	Pct.	GB
1	y – Edmonton Capitals	88	56	32	.636	--
2	x – Calgary Vipers	86	53	33	.616	2.0
3	e – Chico Outlaws	88	41	47	.466	15.0
4	e – Lake County Fielders	63	27	36	.429	16.5
5	e – Maui Na Koa Ikaika	69	29	40	.420	17.5

South Division Regular Season Standings
Pos	Team	G	W	L	Pct.	GB
1	y – San Angelo Colts	88	52	36	.591	--
2	x – Rio Grande Valley WhiteWings	88	51	37	.580	1.0
3	e – Edinburg Roadrunners	89	37	52	.416	15.5
4	e – McAllen Thunder	89	37	52	.416	15.5
5	e – Yuma Scorpions	88	35	53	.398	17.0

- y – Clinched division
- x – Clinched playoff spot
- e – Eliminated from playoff contention

== Statistical leaders ==
=== Hitting ===
Stat	Player	Team	Total
HR	Daryl Jones	San Angelo Colts	28
AVG	David Peralta	Rio Grande Valley WhiteWings	.392
RBIs	Daryl Jones	San Angelo Colts	90
SB	Stantrel Smith	Edinburg Roadrunners	42

=== Pitching ===
Stat	Player	Team	Total
W	Chandler Bernard	San Angelo Colts	12
ERA	Eric Blackwell	Rio Grande Valley WhiteWings	3.01
SO	Logan Williamson	San Angelo Colts	104
SV	Edgar Martinez	Rio Grande Valley WhiteWings	20

To qualify as league leader for hitter, AVG - Minimum of plate appearances of 2.7 per team game. To qualify as league leader for pitcher, ERA - Minimum inning(s) of .8 pitched per team game.

== Playoffs ==
=== Format ===
In 2011, the top two teams in each division advanced to the playoffs. The first round was a best-of-seven Division Championship Series. In the second round, the North American League Championship Series was also a best-of-seven series. The playoffs were held August 29 through September 13.

=== Playoff bracket ===
Division Championship Series (best-of-seven)
North Division
4	Edmonton Capitals	3	7	3	14	12	9	X
1	Calgary Vipers	9	5	15	7	6	2	X
South Division
0	San Angelo Colts	3	3	4	0	X	X	X
4	Rio Grande Valley WhiteWings	4	13	12	9	X	X	X

North American League Championship Series (best-of-seven)
N1	Edmonton Capitals	7	7	10	1	7	X	X
S2	Rio Grande Valley WhiteWings	1	4	3	5	3	X	X
