= Onan Masaoka =

American baseball player (born 1977)

- Pitcher
- Born: October 27, 1977 (age 49); Hilo, Hawaii, U.S.
- Batted: Right Threw: Left

MLB debut
- April 5, 1999, for the Los Angeles Dodgers

Last MLB appearance
- September 30, 2000, for the Los Angeles Dodgers

MLB statistics
- Win–loss record: 3–5
- Earned run average: 4.23
- Strikeouts: 88
- Stats at Baseball Reference

Teams
- Los Angeles Dodgers (1999–2000)

Onan Kainoa Satoshi Masaoka (born October 27, 1977) is an American baseball pitcher who played for the Los Angeles Dodgers in 1999 and 2000.

Drafted by the Los Angeles Dodgers in the 3rd round of the 1995 MLB amateur draft, Masaoka made his Major League Baseball debut with the Dodgers on April 5, 1999, and appeared in his final game on September 30, 2000. One of the highlights of Masaoka's brief major league career occurred on July 11, 1999. In the final game prior to the All Star Break, Masaoka pitched 4 innings in relief of winning pitcher Darren Dreifort. He picked up the one and only save of his major league career during the Dodgers 14-3 blowout win over the Mariners.

The Dodgers traded him to the Chicago White Sox on July 26, 2001 (along with Jeff Barry and Gary Majewski) for James Baldwin and cash. The White Sox assigned him to the AAA Charlotte Knights but released him after the season ended.

He next played professionally with the Gary SouthShore RailCats of the Northern League in 2009 and signed with his hometown Hawaii Stars of the Pacific Association for 2013.
