= Takasago Municipal Baseball Stadium =

Stadium in Hyōgo, Japan

Coordinates: 34°49′10.58″N 134°40′20.85″E

Takasago Municipal Baseball Stadium (高砂市野球場) is a baseball stadium in Takasago, Hyōgo, Japan. The stadium was built in 1972 and has a capacity of 20,000, with 3,230 seats.

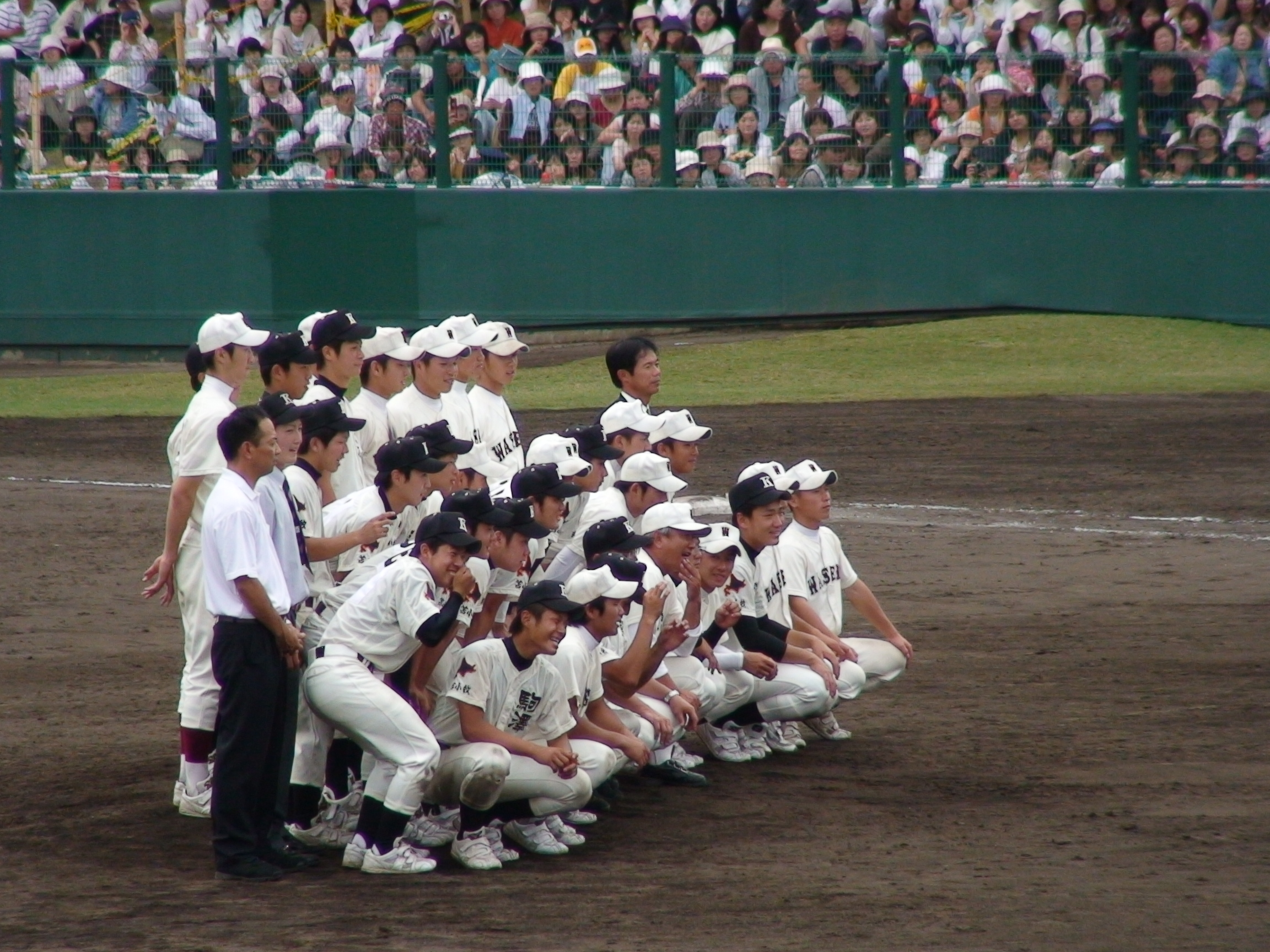
Takasago Municipal Baseball Stadium
