= Freedom Pro Baseball League =

Former independent baseball league

Freedom Professional Baseball League
- Sport: Baseball
- Founded: 2012
- No. of teams: 4
- Country: United States
- Most recent champion: Phoenix Prospectors
- Website: Freedom Pro Baseball League (archived 4 March 2016)

The Freedom Pro Baseball League was an independent baseball league based in Arizona that played in 2012 and 2013. The league started with four teams, the Scottsdale Centennials, Peoria Explorers, Phoenix Prospectors, and the Prescott Federals in 2012. The Phoenix Prospectors won the inaugural league championship in 2012 and repeated as champions in 2013.

Joe Sperle was the President and Founder of the Freedom Pro Baseball League. Sperle, the owner of Joe Sperle's Baseball School, has over 20 years of playing and coaching experience.

Former Major League Baseball players Julio Lugo and Joey Gathright were signed in 2013 to develop their skills to try to make a come back in the Major Leagues.

The league did not play in 2014 because they were unable to work out a lease agreement with Kino Stadium.

== Former teams ==
Team	City	State/Province	Stadium
Goodyear Centennials	Goodyear	Arizona	Goodyear Ballpark
Peoria Explorers	Peoria	Arizona	Peoria Sports Complex
Phoenix Prospectors	Phoenix	Arizona	Phoenix Municipal Stadium
Prescott Montezuma Federals	Prescott	Arizona	Roughrider Park
