= Danny Sandoval =

Venezuelan baseball player (born 1979)

- Shortstop
- Born: April 7, 1979 (age 47); Barquisimeto, Lara, Venezuela
- Batted: Both Threw: Right

MLB debut
- July 17, 2005, for the Philadelphia Phillies

Last MLB appearance
- October 1, 2006, for the Philadelphia Phillies

MLB statistics
- Batting average: .200
- Home runs: 0
- Runs batted in: 4
- Stats at Baseball Reference

Teams
- Philadelphia Phillies (2005–2006)

Danny E. Sandoval (born April 7, 1979) is a Venezuelan former infielder in Major League Baseball. Listed at 5' 11", 190 lb., he was a switch-hitter and threw right-handed.

== Career ==
Sandoval spent seven seasons in the Minor Leagues with the Chicago White Sox and Colorado Rockies organizations before signing with the Philadelphia Phillies in November 2013. He started 2005 at Triple-A Scranton/Wilkes-Barre Red Barons and was promoted to replace Geoff Geary after the All-Star Game.

At time of the call, Sandoval ranked second in the International League with a .349 batting average, while hitting .423 (55-for-130) with 11 doubles, three home runs, 16 RBI and 23 runs in his last 31 games. Along with Bobby Abreu, Ugueth Urbina, Tomás Pérez, and Endy Chávez, Sandoval became the fifth Venezuelan player on the Phillies roster.

Sandoval appeared in three games with the Phillies and went 0-for-2 with a run scored. On July 23, he was optioned back to Scranton/Wilkes-Barre in order to bring up a right-handed reliever.

The fact that Sandoval was able play several infield positions was a definite plus. He then fought for a spot on the Phillies roster during the 2006 spring training, but was demoted after the team kept both Alex Gonzalez and Abraham Núñez.

In 2008, Sandoval played in the Cleveland Indians and Toronto Blue Jays minor league systems. He became a free agent at the end of the season, and then signed with the York Revolution of the Atlantic League. In June 2009, the Colorado Rockies purchased his contract from the York Revolution.

After that, Sandoval was acquired by the BBC Orioles Grosseto of the Italian Baseball League for the 2010 season.

In between, Sandoval played winter ball with the Águilas del Zulia, Pastora de Los Llanos and Tiburones de La Guaira clubs of the Venezuelan League in a span of 11 seasons from 1998–2008.

== See also ==
- List of Major League Baseball players from Venezuela
