= Kensuke Uchimura =

Japanese baseball player (born 1986)

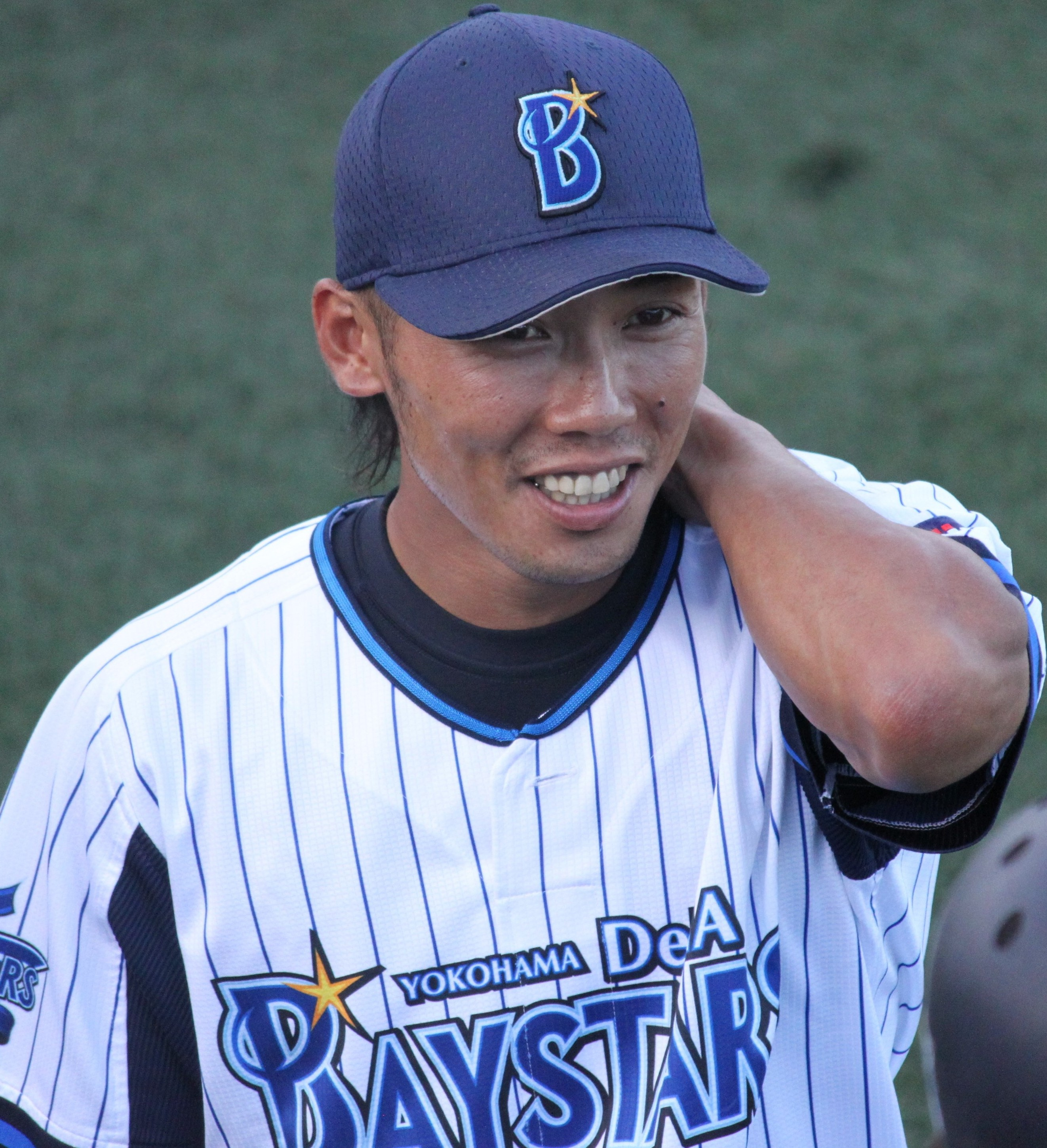
- Uchimura with the Yokohama DeNA BayStars
- Infielder
- Born: March 17, 1986 (age 40); Tokyo, Japan
- Bats: Right Throws: Right

NPB debut
- August 3, 2008, for the Tohoku Rakuten Golden Eagles

NPB statistics (through 2016 season)
- Batting average: .246
- Hits: 340
- RBIs: 97
- Stats at Baseball Reference

Teams
- Tohoku Rakuten Golden Eagles (2008 – 2012); Yokohama DeNA BayStars (2012 – 2016)

Kensuke Uchimura (内村賢介, Uchimura Kensuke; born March 17, 1986) is a Japanese baseball infielder. He previously played for the Yokohama DeNA BayStars in Japan's Pacific League.
