= Shinano Grandserows =

Information
- League: Baseball Challenge League: Advance-West
- Ballpark: Nagano Olympic Stadium
- Established: 2007
- BC League championships: 1 (2017)
- Division Champions: 2 (2017,2019): First Half (2017, 2019); Second Half (2019)
- Colors: White, Red
- Ownership: Nagano Kenmin Kyudan Co., Ltd
- Manager: Yuichi Yanagisawa

The Shinano Grandserows (信濃グランセローズ, Shinano Granduserows) are a semi-professional baseball team in the Baseball Challenge League of Japan, playing in the Advance-West Division. They are the only professional baseball team in Nagano Prefecture, with the team named after the Serow, found in the region, to reflect this.

== Franchise history ==
The Shinano Grandserows were one of the founding members of the Baseball Challenge League in 2007, participating in the inaugural season and finishing third out of four with a 31-35-6 record. The team failed to reach the playoffs until 2012, when they finished second in both halves of the-then Joshinetsu Division, qualifying only because the Niigata Albirex had won both halves of the season. Shinano lost the three game Division Series 1–0, whilst Niigata went on to the title that year.

The team would have its best season in 2017, finishing second place in the first half only one game back from the Toyoma GRN Thunderbirds, and topping the Advance-West with a 0.722 winning percentage. In the Division playoff, they would sweep the Thunderbirds 2–0 in three games to reach the championship series, where they lifted the BC League Championship Trophy after a 4 -1 series win over the Gunma Diamond Pegasus.

In 2014, Philippine international catcher Alfredo Olivares Jr. became the first Filipino player to play in the Japanese minor league system when he signed for the team, but only played for one season.

== Home stadiums ==
The Shinano Grandserows currently play home games at ten different stadiums in nine cities in Nagano Prefecture: Nagano Olympic Stadium and Nagano Ken-ei Kyujo in Nagano City, as well as stadiums in Ueda, Matsumoto, Ina, Iida, Suwa, Chino, Komoro and Nakano.

== Roster ==
Updated as of July 25, 2021.

Pitchers:

- Mizuki Akatsuka (15)
- Oaka Itsuki (31)
- Yuki Miyano (18)
- Reiya Munekuni (19)
- Seiki Oshima (41)
- Cristian Quintin (77)
- Shun Sasaki (14)
- Sado Shunta (17)
- Shunsuke Suzuki (20)
- Kai Yoshihara (21)
- Yawata Yuki (11)

Catchers:

- Yudai Aida (27)
- Takanori Hamada (30)
- Seito Matsukura (78)

Infielders:

- Hitoshi Arai (1)
- Ben Haydon (80)
- Keiji Konishi (55)
- Ohara Okawa (6)
- Yu Sawabata (5)
- Daiki Tsuji (23)
- Jhoan Ureña (51)
- Yudai Yamamoto (2)

Outfielders:

- Hiroki Inoue (24)
- Ren Ito (66)
- Yukihiro Iwata (8)
- Furuya Sosei (29)
- Kumagai Takahiro (48)

Trainees:

- P Fumiya Morii (13)
- OF Yoshitake Tsuchida (33)
