= Goodyear Ballpark =

Baseball stadium in Goodyear, Arizona, US

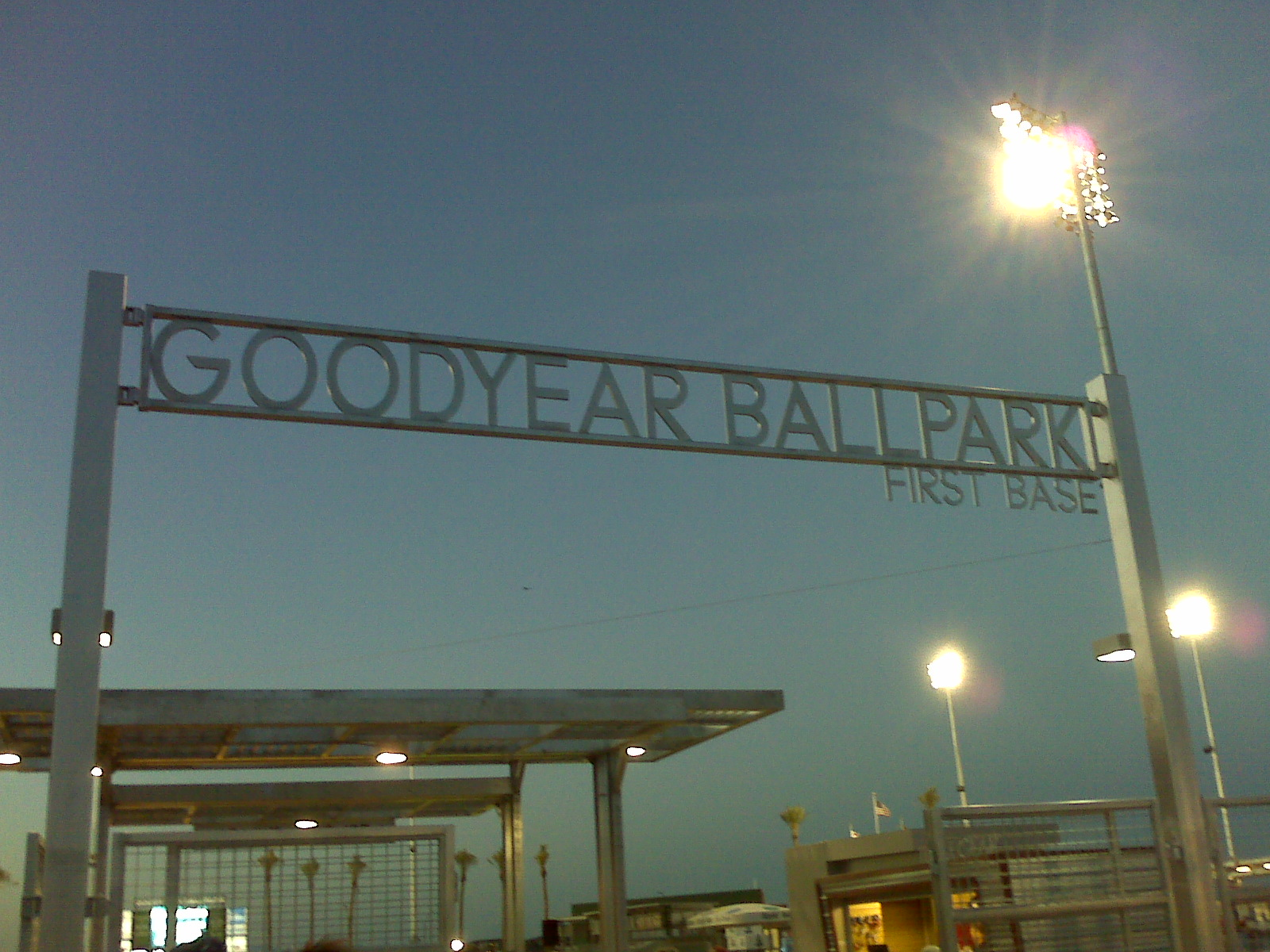
- Interactive map of Goodyear Ballpark
- Location: 1933 S. Ballpark Way; Goodyear, AZ 85338
- Coordinates: 33°25′45″N 112°23′24″W
- Owner: City of Goodyear
- Capacity: 8,000 seats, 1,500 berm seats
- Surface: Grass
- Field size: Left field: 345 feet (105 m); Center field: 410 feet (120 m); Right field: 345 feet (105 m)

Construction
- Groundbreaking: March 2008
- Opened: February 21, 2009
- Architect: Populous

Tenants
- Cleveland Guardians (Spring Training) (MLB) (2009–present); Cincinnati Reds (Spring Training) (MLB) (2010–present)

Website
- https://www.goodyearbp.com/

Goodyear Ballpark is a stadium in Goodyear, Arizona (a western suburb of Phoenix), and part of a baseball complex that is the current spring training home of the Cleveland Guardians and the Cincinnati Reds. The stadium opened to the public with a grand opening ceremony on February 21, 2009, and held its first Cactus League spring training baseball game on February 25, 2009. The stadium complex is owned by the city of Goodyear and contains the main field with a seating capacity of 9,500 along with several practice fields and team offices.

The main entrance of the stadium is modern and uses surfaces mimicking dark stained wood and polished metal. The entrance houses a team shop, several concession stands and is decorated with Guardians posters on the 1st base side and Reds on the 3rd base side. The entrance also has a third story terrace patio that can be rented for private parties or group tickets during games. Outside the main entrance, the concourse features a 60-foot 6 inch fiberglass statue titled The Ziz created by artist Donald Lipski. The main entrance structure does not interfere with the inside of the stadium which is a single tier of seating. Free standing polished metal awnings with fabric shades provide shelter from the sun down the third base line. Bullpens are located off the field in left and left center field. There is a large scoreboard in left field with general admission seating on a grass berm at its base. A cinder block concession stand in center field is painted dark green to provide a backdrop for the hitters. Right field features a second grass berm and a patio seating area and bar. The patio and bar area, like the Terrace patio, can be rented for private parties. There are two large grassy concourses, and a Wiffle Ball field on the first base side of the stadium.

Goodyear Ballpark replaces Chain of Lakes Park in Winter Haven, Florida, as the Guardians' spring training home, and Ed Smith Stadium in Sarasota, Florida, as the Reds' spring training home. The stadium is primarily used for baseball but also hosts a variety of community events including the City of Goodyear's Star Spangled 4th and Fall Festival.
