= Maehara Stadium =

Baseball stadium in Hawaii, United States

Maehara Wailuku Stadium
- 96793 Park
- Interactive map of Maehara Wailuku Stadium
- Full name: Grand Ichiro "Iron" Maehara Stadium
- Location: Wailuku, Hawaii
- Coordinates: 20.894704°N 156.487750°W
- Capacity: 1,500

Construction
- Built: 1973

Tenants
- Maui Stingrays (HWB) (1993–1997); Na Koa Ikaika Maui (GBL/NAL/Pacific Assn.) (2010–2013)

Maehara Stadium is a stadium in Wailuku, Hawaii. It is primarily used for baseball, and was the home field of Na Koa Ikaika Maui from 2010 to 2013. It also hosted the Maui Stingrays of the Hawaii Winter Baseball league.

== History ==
The park opened in 1973 and holds 1,500 spectators. It is named after Ichiro "Iron" Maehara, a Maui baseball advocate. It is located next to War Memorial Stadium.

Maehara Stadium is home to the Maui Interscholastic League Baseball and American Legion Games. In 1974, it played host to the Hawaii State Championship Game, featuring University of Hawaii pitching legend, then Aiea High School's sophomore sensation Derek Tatsuno against Baldwin High School's (Island of Maui) ace pitcher Tom Valdez. The pitching contest ended in a 1–0 decision in favor of Aiea High School. Valdez was drafted later that year by the St. Louis Cardinals. Tatsuno went on to star at the University of Hawaii and professional baseball in Japan.
