= Gunma Diamond Pegasus =

Japanese baseball team

Information
- League: Baseball Challenge League: Future—East
- Ballpark: Takasaki City Jonan Baseball Stadium
- Established: 2008
- 3 championships: 2009,2014,2016
- Division championships: 5 (2008–2010,2014,2016)
- Colors: Black, Blue
- Ownership: Gunma Sports Management, Inc.

The Gunma Diamond Pegasus (群馬ダイヤモンドペガサス, Gunma Daiyamondo Pegasasu) are a semi-professional baseball team in the Baseball Challenge League of Japan. The team was established as part of the expansion of the league, and began play in the 2008 season. Their home is Gunma Prefecture.

== Franchise history ==
The Diamond Pegasus were Jōshin'etsu Division winners from 2008–2010; they won the Baseball Challenge League championship in 2009.

Long-time Yomiuri Giants outfielder Takayuki Shimizu played for Gunma in 2010. Venezuelan left-hander Robert Zarate pitched for Gunma in 2010 before signing with Nippon Professional Baseball's Hanshin Tigers.

Long-time NPB reliever Soichi Fujita pitched for Gunma in 2012, as did French players Frédéric Hanvi and Felix Brown.

The 2014 Diamond Pegasus roster had a strong Venezuelan flavor: Long-time Nippon Professional Baseball slugger Alex Ramírez played for the team as a player-coach, hitting .305 with 7 home runs and 38 RBI in 45 games. Fellow countrymen and also former NPB players Levi Romero and Robert Zarate (who returned to the team after three seasons with Hanshin) were also on the 2014 squad.

Following the 2014 season, Ramírez retired from playing and was named the Gunma Pegasus' Senior Director. Zarate was scouted by Major League Baseball's Tampa Bay Rays, and in 2015 joined their organization.

== Roster ==
Updated as of July 25, 2021.

Pitchers:

- Sonoda Akira (21)
- Ryoma Anzai (25)
- Masateru Aosaki (18)
- Kohei Fukasawa (20)
- Ryuki Iguchi (41)
- Yu Miyashita (31)
- Yuki Mori (11)
- Yusei Nishihama (15)
- Kyodai Ogino (17)
- Daiki Tashiro (21)
- Toyoji Yoshioka (19)

Catchers:

- Takanari Hayami (99)
- Katsuhito Tomatsu (51)

Infielders:

- Shota Kaneko (24)
- Ryo Kikuchi (33)
- Hironami Nakamichi (1)
- Seishin Takahashi (35)
- Shota Yuasa (6)

Oufielders:

- Yusuke Arima (52)
- Kanuma Hiiragi (34)
- Yusuke Inoguchi (28)
- Yohei Kudo (7)
- Koichi Okumura (55)
- Kei Shimada (5)
- Tatsuya Takayama (8)

Trainees:

- P Ryoma Higashino (13)
- P Yonder Ramirez (-)
- P Kojuro Shioda (12)
- P Naoya Takahashi (14)
- P Hiroto Yasuda (16)
- C Tomoya Ibaraki (27)
- C Kobe Kota (62)
- C Yoshio Suzuki (2)
- C Atsushi Watanabe (32)
- IF Yuya Mitsui (23)
