= Sonoma County Grapes =

- Logo

Information
- League: North American League (Northern Division)
- Location: Sonoma County, California
- Ballpark: Road team
- Founded: 2012
- Disbanded: 2012
- Colors: Burgundy, Purple, Green and Grey
- Ownership: Centerfield Partners
- Website: grapesbaseball.com

The Sonoma County Grapes were an independent professional baseball team and were members of the North American League. They played as a road team in 2012 in the Northern Division along with the Hawaii Stars, Na Koa Ikaika Maui and San Rafael Pacifics. They replaced the Orange County Flyers when that team's owners withdrew from the league.

They were owned by Centerfield Partners, who also owned the San Rafael Pacifics. When the league disbanded after the 2012 season, there was some talk of them joining the new Pacific Association of Professional Baseball Clubs but since they could not find a permanent home the team was disbanded. They were replaced two years later by the Sonoma Stompers.

== Inaugural season ==
The Sonoma County Grapes began their inaugural 2012 season against the San Rafael Pacifics. In the first game, Fred Atkins homered on the very first pitch, marking a franchise milestone, though the Grapes lost 1–3. They then dropped the next two games before earning their first victory of the season with an 18–4 win, eventually splitting the six-game series by winning the final three games.

The team then traveled to Hawaii, where it split a six-game series against the Hawaii Stars. The Grapes followed with a difficult stretch against Maui Na Koa Ikaika, losing five of six games, and returned to California with a 7–11 record. After a 2–4 series loss to the San Rafael, the team went back to Hawaii, again dropping five of six games to the Stars. The Grapes concluded the stretch in Maui with five wins in 12 games.

Following an extended road trip in Hawaii from July 10 to 29, the Grapes hosted the East Bay Lumberjacks in an unofficial exhibition on August 2, marking the franchise’s first home game while exploring potential venues for the 2013 season. The game, held at Recreational Park in Healdsburg, California, ended in an 8–2 victory for the Grapes. A second exhibition against San Rafael, scheduled for August 9, was later canceled due to a scheduling conflict.

The Grapes resumed regular-season play and closed the year by winning their final series against the Pacifics, four games to two, finishing the season with a 19–29 record. At the conclusion of the Grapes’ 2012 season, the Pacifics signed catcher D. J. Dixon, infielder Bunyu Maeda, and pitcher Vinny Pacchetti for their remaining regular-season games and postseason run against Na Koa Ikaika.

Outfielder Mark Micowski was named the league’s Rookie of the Year, while Dixon, Brandon Gregorich, and Dustin Crenshaw received honorable mention All-Star selections. Because the Grapes’ 2012 season concluded earlier than many other independent leagues, several players finished the year elsewhere. Gregorich joined the Schaumburg Boomers of the Frontier League, and Crenshaw signed with the Capitales de Québec of the Can-Am League.

== 2012 Final Roster ==
2012 Sonoma County Grapes
Roster
Pitchers: 27 Nicholas Alexander; 20 Shane Cadaret; 24 Dustin Crenshaw; 29 Matthew Gibbs; 25 Michael Hebert; 10 Michael Johnson; 8 Jeff Lyons; 6 Daniel March; 15 Ross Pomerantz; 3 Robert Savarese	Catchers: 2 Tyler Finley; 11 Ben Liepman; Infielders: 17 Colin Bryan; 4 Chris Debiasi; 21 Brandon Gregorich; 30 Joseph Lewis; 19 Samuel Perry	Outfielders: 1 Fred Atkins; 7 George Ban; 22 Tayler Cresswell; 12 Mark Micowski	Manager: ## Joe Morello; Coaches: ## Albie Lopez (bench/pitching)
