= Ishikawa Million Stars =

Japanese baseball team

Information
- League: Baseball Challenge League: Advance—West
- Ballpark: Kanazawa Municipal Baseball Stadium
- Established: 2007
- 4 championships: 2007, 2010, 2011, 2013
- Division championships: 6 (2007, 2009–2011, 2013, 2016)
- Colors: Blue, White, Gold
- Ownership: Ishikawa Million Stars Co., Ltd.
- Manager: Eiji Kanamori (2007-2008); Shinji Mori (2009–2014); Julio Franco (2015); Masato Watanabe(2016- )

The Ishikawa Million Stars (石川ミリオンスターズ, Ishikawa Mirion Sutāzu) are a semi-professional baseball team in the Baseball Challenge League of Japan. The team was established in 2007. Their home is Ishikawa Prefecture. Former Major League Baseball star Julio Franco was the team's player-manager. The team is also notable for having female knuckleball pitcher Eri Yoshida on their roster.

== Franchise history ==
The team has won four Baseball Challenge League championships, in 2007, 2010, 2011, and 2013.

Ishikawa Infielder Kensuke Uchimura led the BC League in steals in 2007, which led to him being drafted by Nippon Professional Baseball's Rakuten Golden Eagles, In 2008, he became the first player to reach NPB after playing in the BC League.

Former Nippon Professional Baseball (NPB) player Kazuaki Minami pitched for the Million Stars in 2008, leading to a tryout with the Chiba Lotte Marines. (Minami did not end up playing for the Marines.)

In 2009, former NPB pitcher Shinji Mori joined the Million Stars as a pitcher-coach. Retiring from playing, he took over as full-time manager in 2010, staying through the 2014 season. He returned to active duty as a player in 2013, and was the Million Stars' player-manager in 2013–2014.

Pitcher Kazuaki Minami returned to the Million Stars for the 2013 season. Former Boston Red Sox/New York Mets player Chris Carter also played for the team in 2013. In 2013, the Million Stars were one of two Baseball Challenge League teams to play interleague games against the two Hawaii-based teams of the shirt-lived Pacific Association of Professional Baseball Clubs.

Masao Kida, who also played MLB and NPB, pitched for the Million Stars in 2013–2014. The team held a retirement ceremony for Kida on September 14, 2014. He struck out the side, and his uniform number 12 was retired by the team.

== Former players ==
In addition to player-manager Julio Franco, the team's pitching staff has included pitcher-coach Kazuhito Tadano, who previously played both Major League Baseball and Nippon Professional Baseball. Female knuckleballer Eri Yoshida also pitched for the Million Stars.

== Roster ==
Updated as of July 25, 2021.

Pitchers:

- Ryotaro Aoyama (16)
- Tsuyoshi Fujita (13)
- Fumiya Ishikawa (11)
- Nao Kaneko (20)
- Shuntaro Kondo (18)
- Takumi Matsukawa (14)
- Fumiaki Murakami (45)
- Yosuke Shimizu (15)
- Sho Tagami (38)
- Ryusei Takada (17)
- Nijitaka Takahashi (65)

Catchers:

- Ryuto Nakamura (25)
- Yohei Omiyama (27)
- Kosuke Ue (2)

Infielders:

- Toshitetsu Kawasaki (5)
- Tomoya Kuga (3)
- Kusunoki Yae Masaya (8)
- Takaaki Miyamoto (33)
- Kyosuke Shimada (1)
- Oe Ugo (4)

Outfielders:

- Atsushi Hata (9)
- Yukiya Kono (24)
- Takashi Mizuno (6)
- Hirohiro Nakagawa (37)
- Yuki Nakamura (7)

Trainees:

- P Shingo Fukutani (26)
- P Takumi Sakamoto (19)
- IF Ryo Tanaka (41)
- OF Kai Ikeda (31)
- OF Yasuto Ito (36)

== Retired numbers ==
- 12 (Japan) Masao Kida (木田 優夫)
