= Baseball Challenge League =

Japanese minor-league baseball league

Route Inn BC League
- Sport: Baseball
- Founded: 2006
- First season: 2007
- President: Murayama Tetsuji
- No. of teams: 9
- Country: Japan
- Most recent champion: Gunma Diamond Pegasus (2026)
- Most titles: Gunma Diamond Pegasus (7)
- Website: http://www.bc-l.jp/

The Baseball Challenge League (ベースボール・チャレンジ・リーグ, Bēsubōru Charenji Rīgu), known as the Route Inn BCL for sponsorship purposes, is an independent baseball league in Japan. The league's abbreviated designation is "BC League (BCリーグ)."

== League structure ==
The 72-game season runs from April–October, split into two half-terms, with the division champion from each half-term meeting in a playoff at the end of the year to determine which two teams compete for the league championship. Each team carries 27 players.

Typically, players earn 150,000 yen (c. U.S. $2,000) per month, with another 50,000 yen in potential bonuses. The league imposes a 7.2 million yen (c. U.S. $60,600) salary limit for team managers.

Not every team has a permanent home stadium. Instead, the team travels around its home prefecture, playing in different stadiums, each one called "home” for that game.

== History ==
The BC League began play in 2007 as the Hokushinestu Baseball Challenge League. It originally consisted of four teams based in the Hokuriku region: the Ishikawa Million Stars, the Niigata Albirex Baseball Club, the Shinano Grandserows, and the Toyama Thunderbirds. In 2008 the league added two teams, Gunma Diamond Pegasus and the Fukui Miracle Elephants, and split into two divisions, Jōshin'etsu (Gunma, Shinano, and Niigata) and Hokuriku (Fukui, Ishikawa, and Toyama).

Ishikawa Million Stars Infielder Kensuke Uchimura led the league in steals in 2007, which led to him being drafted by Nippon Professional Baseball's (NBP) Rakuten Golden Eagles. In 2008, he became the first player to reach NPB after playing in the BC League.

In February 2014, the league agreed to a naming rights deal with Route Inn Group, becoming the Route Inn BC League.

That same month, it was announced that a new team, the Musashi Heat Bears, based out of Saitama Prefecture, would join the league in time for the 2015 season. In July 2014, it was announced that a second new team, the Fukushima Hopes, would also join the league for the 2015 season.

Late in the summer of 2014, along with the Shikoku Island League Plus, the Route Inn BCL formed the Japan Independent Baseball League Organization.

With the addition of two new teams, in 2015 the league realigned and renamed its divisions, replacing the previous divisions Jōshin'etsu and Hokuriku with Future—East and Advance—West. The team adopted a three-division alignment in 2020.

In September 2021, Toyama, Ishikawa, Fukui, and Shiga (the West division) announced that they would leave the league in 2022 and form a new league, the Nihonkai Ocean League.

In 2026, the BCL partnered with the NPB to host the NPB Challenge Cup, wherein the nine teams of the BCL would play a total of 81 games against the third-string teams of the Yomiuri Giants, Saitama Seibu Lions, and Fukuoka SoftBank Hawks, with the winning BCL team being the one with highest winning percentage against the NBP teams.

== Teams ==
2026 season

Division	Team Name	Founded	Location	League Championships	Division Titles	Half Term Titles	Team Colour	Home Park
East	Chiba Sky Sailors	2026	Chiba Prefecture	0	0	0		Funabashi Municipal Baseball Stadium
East	Fukushima RedHopes	2014	Fukushima Prefecture	0	1	1		Fukushima Azuma Baseball Stadium
East	Ibaraki Astro Planets	2017	Ibaraki Prefecture	0	1	0		Kanakubo Athletic Park Baseball Stadium
East	Tochigi Golden Braves	2016	Tochigi Prefecture	1	1	1		Oyama Athlete Park Baseball Stadium
East	Gunma Diamond Pegasus	2008	Gunma Prefecture	5	8	14		Takasaki City Jonan Baseball Stadium
West	Saitama Musashi Heat Bears	2014	Saitama Prefecture	1	2	0		Kumagaya Park Stadium
West	Kanagawa Future Dreams	2019	Kanagawa Prefecture	2	1	0		Hiratsuka Studium
West	Yamanashi Firewinds	2025	Yamanashi Prefecture	0	0	0		Yamabi YBS Stadium
West	Shinano Grandserows	2007	Nagano Prefecture	2	5	3		Nagano Olympic Stadium

== Yearly standings ==
League champion
Division champion

Year	First	Second	Third	Fourth
2007	Ishikawa	Toyama	Shinano	Niigata

Joshin'etsu Division					Hokuriku Division				
Year		First	Second	Third	Year		First	Second	Third
2008	First half	Niigata	Gunma	Shinano	2008	First half	Toyama	Ishikawa	Fukui
2008	Second half	Gunma	Niigata	Shinano	2008	Second half	Toyama	Ishikawa	Fukui
2009	First half	Gunma	Niigata	Shinano	2009	First half	Ishikawa	Toyama	Fukui
2009	Second half	Gunma	Niigata	Shinano	2009	Second half	Ishikawa	Toyama	Fukui
2010	First half	Gunma	Shinano	Niigata	2010	First half	Ishikawa	Fukui	Toyama
2010	Second half	Gunma	Niigata	Shinano	2010	Second half	Fukui	Ishikawa	Toyama
2011	First half	Gunma	Shinano	Niigata	2011	First half	Ishikawa	Toyama	Fukui
2011	Second half	Niigata	Shinano	Gunma	2011	Second half	Fukui	Ishikawa	Toyama
2012	First half	Niigata	Shinano	Gunma	2012	First half	Ishikawa	Fukui	Toyama
2012	Second half	Niigata	Shinano	Gunma	2012	Second half	Fukui	Toyama	Ishikawa
2013	First half	Niigata	Gunma	Shinano	2013	First half	Ishikawa	Toyama	Fukui
2013	Second half	Niigata	Shinano	Gunma	2013	Second half	Fukui	Toyama	Ishikawa
2014	First half	Gunma	Niigata	Shinano	2014	First half	Toyama	Fukui	Ishikawa
2014	Second half	Niigata	Gunma	Shinano	2014	Second half	Ishikawa	Toyama	Fukui

Future-East								Advance-West						
Year		First	Second	Third	Fourth	Fifth	Sixth	Year		First	Second	Third	Fourth	Fifth
2015	First half	Niigata	Musashi	Gunma	Fukushima	-	-	2015	First half	Fukui	Shinano	Ishikawa	Toyama	-
2015	Second half	Fukushima	Niigata	Gunma	Musashi	-	-	2015	Second half	Toyama	Fukui	Ishikawa	Shinano	-
2016	First half	Gunma	Fukushima	Niigata	Musashi	-	-	2016	First half	Ishikawa	Fukui	Shinano	Toyama	-
2016	Second half	Gunma	Fukushima	Niigata	Musashi	-	-	2016	Second half	Ishikawa	Shinano	Toyama	Fukui	-
2017	First half	Gunma	Niigata	Fukushima	Musashi	Tochigi	-	2017	First half	Toyama	Shinano	Fukui	Shiga	Ishikawa
2017	Second half	Gunma	Fukushima	Niigata	Tochigi	Musashi	-	2017	Second half	Shinano	Toyama	Fukui	Ishikawa	Shiga
2018	First half	Gunma	Fukushima	Niigata	Musashi	Tochigi	-	2018	First half	Fukui	Shinano	Ishikawa	Toyama	Shiga
2018	Second half	Gunma	Fukushima	Tochigi	Niigata	Musashi	-	2018	Second half	Toyama	Fukui	Shinano	Ishikawa	Shiga
2019	First half	Gunma	Niigata	Tochigi	Fukushima	Musashi	Ibaraki	2019	First half	Shinano	Toyama	Ishikawa	Shiga	Fukui
2019	Second half	Tochigi	Niigata	Gunma	Musashi	Fukushima	Ibaraki	2019	Second half	Shinano	Ishikawa	Toyama	Fukui	Shiga

Eastern Division					Central Division					Western Division				
Year	First	Second	Third	Fourth	Year	First	Second	Third	Fourth	Year	First	Second	Third	Fourth
2020	Tochigi	Kanagawa	Saitama	Ibaraki	2020	Shinano	Fukushima	Niigata	Gunma	2020	Fukui	Toyama	Ishikawa	Shiga
2021	Saitama	Tochigi	Kanagawa	Ibaraki	2021	Gunma	Shinano	Niigata	Fukushima	2021	Shiga	Toyama	Ishikawa	Fukui

North Division						South Division				
Year	First	Second	Third	Fourth		Year	First	Second	Third	Fourth
2022	Shinano	Niigata	Gunma	Fukushima		2022	Ibaraki	Tochigi	Saitama	Kanagawa
2023	Shinano	Niigata	Fukushima	Gunma		2023	Saitama	Tochigi	Kanagawa	Ibaraki
No Divisions
Year	First	Second	Third	Fourth	Fifth	Sixth	Seventh			
2024	Kanagawa	Shinano	Gunma	Ibaraki	Saitama	Fukushima	Tochigi			
BC-East						BC-West				
Year	First	Second	Third	Fourth		Year	First	Second	Third	Fourth
2025	Gunma	Tochigi	Ibaraki	Fukushima		2025	Kanagawa	Shinano	Saitama	Yamanshi
No Divisions
Year	First	Second	Third	Fourth	Fifth	Sixth	Seventh	Eighth	Ninth	
2026	Gunma	Fukushima	Saitama	Kanagawa	Tochigi	Ibaraki	Yamanshi	Shinano	Chiba	
