= List of mayors of Surprise, Arizona =

City of Surprise, Arizona mayors

Mayor of Surprise, Arizona
- Flag of Surprise, Arizona
- Incumbent; Kevin Sartor since January 2025
- Type: Mayor
- Member of: City council
- Term length: 4 years
- Formation: December 12, 1960
- First holder: William E. Williams
- Deputy: Vice mayor
- Website: Office of the Mayor

The following is a list of mayors of the city of Surprise, Arizona, United States.

== Mayors ==
Mayor	Term	Notes	Ref.
William E. Williams	December 1960 – April 1965	Williams became mayor of Surprise when it became an incorporated town in 1960. Appointed by county supervisors.	
Harold Yingling	April 1965 – December 1966	Ousted in recall election in December 1966.	
Grover King	December 1966 – April 1969		
George Cumbie	April 1969 – June 1989		
Roy Villanueva	June 1989 – June 1995		
Joan H. Shafer	June 1995 – December 31, 2007	Shafer was the city's first elected mayor, rather than council-appointed. Also the city's first female mayor.	
Lyn Truitt	January 1, 2008 – December 31, 2011		
Sharon Wolcott	January 1, 2012 – November 16, 2018	Wolcott resigned in November 2018, moving to Tucson.	
Skip Hall	November 20, 2018 – December 31, 2024	Hall was appointed by the city council to fill Wolcott's vacancy, then elected at large in 2020.	
Kevin Sartor	January 1, 2025 – present		

== See also ==
- Surprise history
