= Surprise Stadium =

Baseball venue in Surprise, Arizona, United States

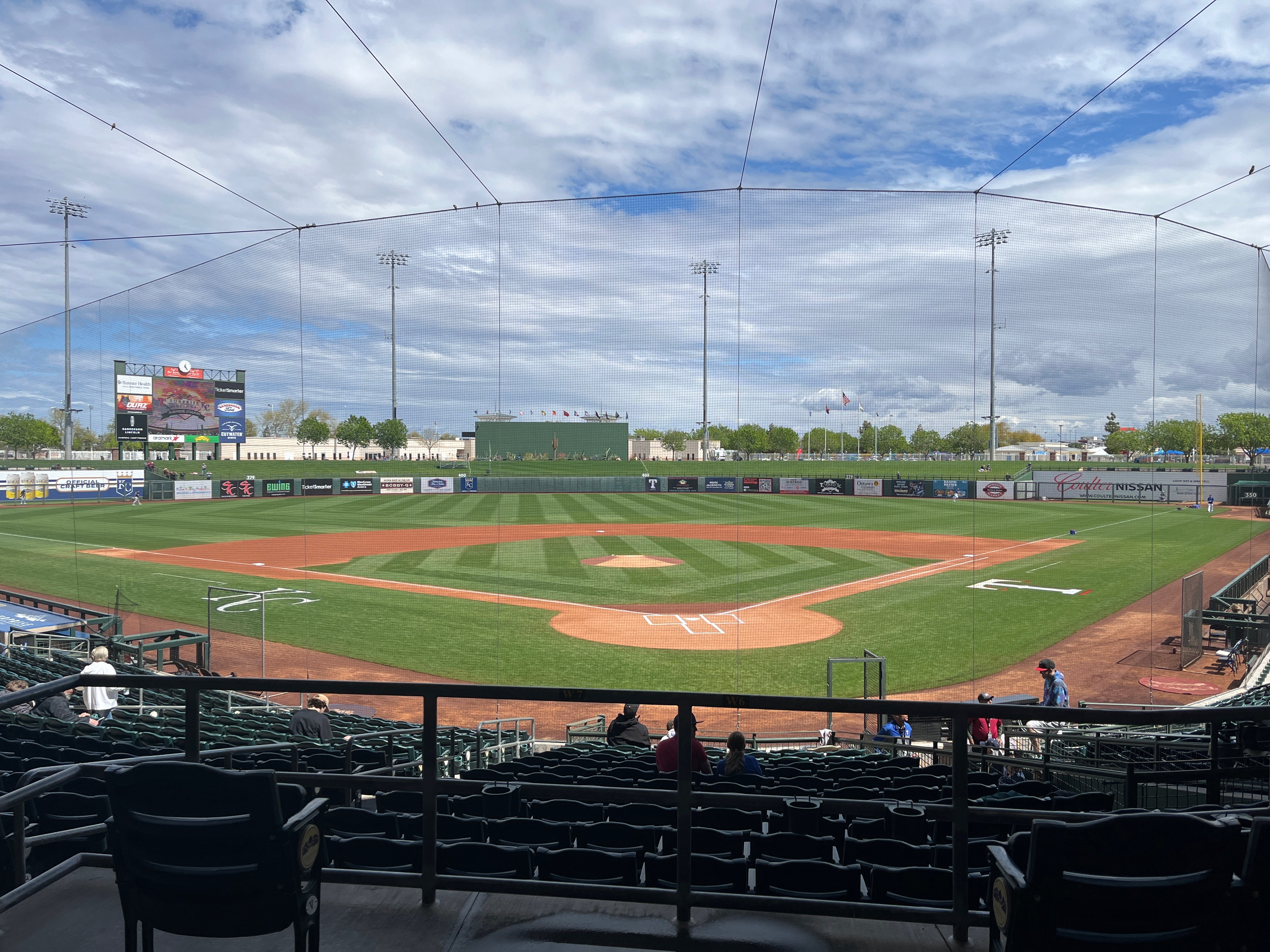
- Surprise Stadium in March 2023
- Interactive map of Surprise Stadium
- Address: 15850 N. Bullard Ave; Surprise, Arizona; United States
- Coordinates: 33°37′40″N 112°22′40″W
- Capacity: 10,500
- Surface: Grass
- Field size: Left Field: 350 feet (110 m); Left-Center Field: 379 feet (116 m); Center Field: 400 feet (120 m); Right-Center Field: 379 feet (116 m); Right Field: 350 feet (110 m)
- Acreage: 124 acres (50 ha)

Construction
- Built: 2002
- Opened: December 8, 2002
- Architect: Populous

Tenants
- Kansas City Royals (MLB) (spring training) 2003–present; Texas Rangers (MLB) (spring training) 2003–present; Surprise Saguaros (AFL) 2011–present; Surprise Rafters (AFL) 2007–2010; Grand Canyon/Surprise Rafters (AFL) 2005–2010; Surprise Scorpions (AFL) 2005; Surprise Fightin' Falcons (GBL) 2005

Website
- www.surprisestadium.com

Surprise Stadium is a baseball venue located at the Surprise Recreation Campus athletic facility in Surprise, Arizona, United States. The stadium opened in 2002 and seats 10,714 people. It is the spring training facility for the Kansas City Royals and the Texas Rangers. It is also the home of the Arizona Fall League's Surprise Saguaros. The venue was previously the home of the Golden Baseball League's Surprise Fightin' Falcons, which disbanded after their only season in 2005. Surprise Stadium is owned and managed by the City of Surprise Sports and Tourism Department.

== History ==
Surprise Stadium was developed as part of the Surprise Recreation Campus to accommodate the spring training operations of the Kansas City Royals and Texas Rangers. Both organizations previously conducted spring training in Florida before relocating their operations to Arizona for the 2003 season. Construction began on May 21, 2001, and the complex was formally dedicated on December 7, 2002. The Royals and Rangers played their first spring training game at the stadium on February 27, 2003, with Kansas City defeating Texas 6–3.

The facility was designed by HOK Sport, the architectural firm subsequently renamed Populous. Its development formed part of a broader municipal recreation project that included baseball practice facilities and other community amenities. The stadium's playing field is named Billy Parker Field in recognition of Billy Parker, a former professional baseball player and Surprise parks and recreation director.

== Stadium design and facilities ==
Surprise Stadium features a natural-grass playing surface and a seating configuration consisting of a lower seating bowl, an upper seating area, and an outfield grass berm. Its listed capacity is 10,714 spectators. The field measures 350 feet (107 m) along both foul lines, 379 feet (116 m) to the left- and right-center-field power alleys, and 400 feet (122 m) to center field. The upper level includes club seating and private suites, while the outfield berm provides additional general-admission viewing space. The stadium also contains concession areas, merchandise facilities, and spectator amenities. The surrounding spring training complex includes multiple practice diamonds and separate clubhouse and training facilities for the Royals and Rangers. These facilities support major- and minor-league player development activities.
