= Ozzie Virgil =

Ozzie Virgil may refer to:

- Ozzie Virgil Sr. (1932–2024), Dominican baseball utility player and coach in Major League Baseball
- Ozzie Virgil Jr. (born 1956), Puerto Rican baseball catcher, All-Star in Major League Baseball
