= Desi Wilson =

American baseball player (born 1969)

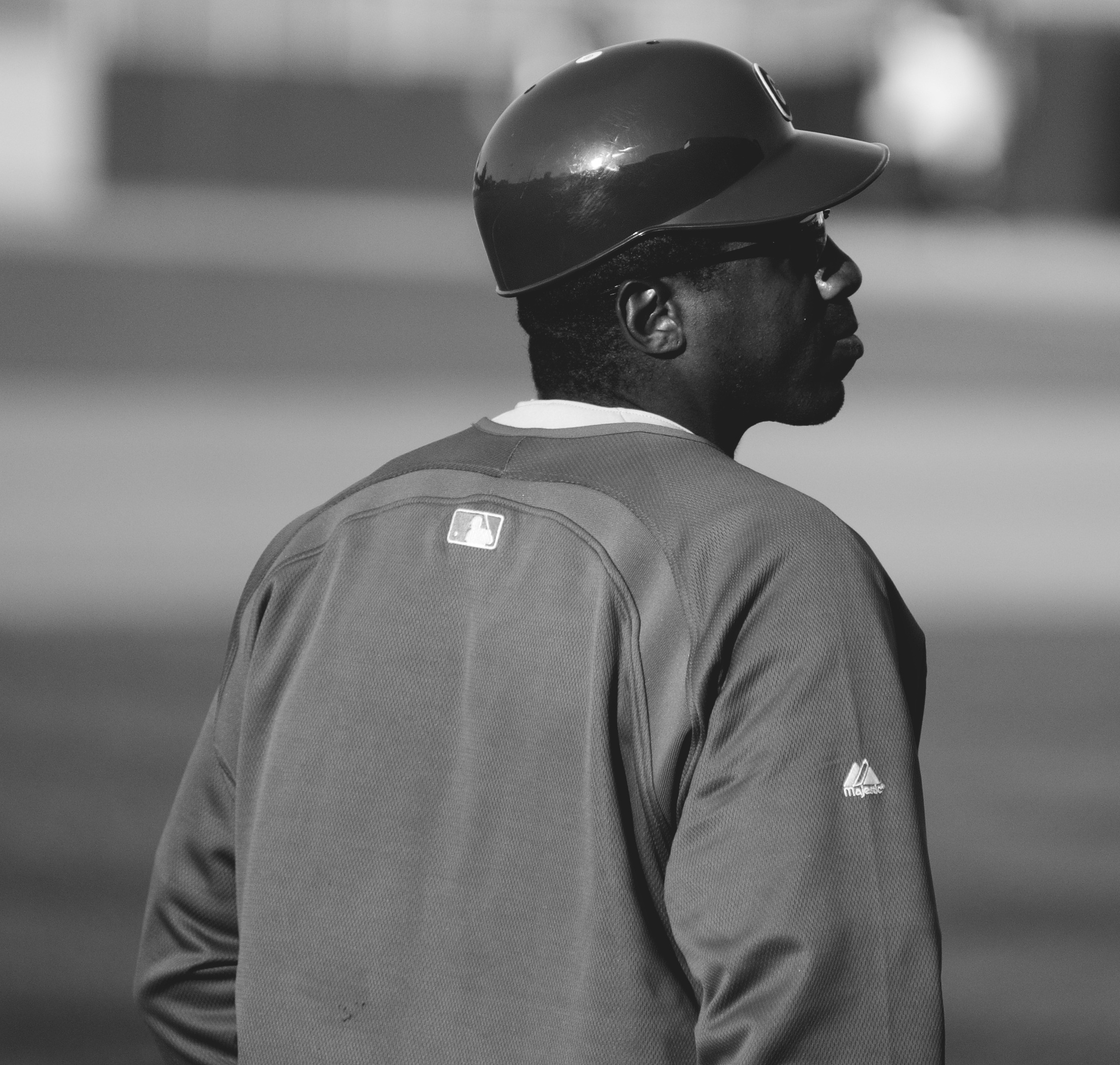
- Wilson with the Peoria Chiefs in 2008
- First baseman
- Born: May 9, 1969 (age 57); Glen Cove, New York, U.S.
- Batted: Left Threw: Left

Professional debut
- MLB: August 7, 1996, for the San Francisco Giants
- NPB: August 12, 1998, for the Hanshin Tigers

Last appearance
- MLB: September 29, 1996, for the San Francisco Giants
- NPB: September 23, 1998, for the Hanshin Tigers

MLB statistics
- Batting average: .271
- Home runs: 2
- Runs batted in: 12

NPB statistics
- Batting average: .167
- Home runs: 0
- Runs batted in: 3
- Stats at Baseball Reference

Teams
- San Francisco Giants (1996); Hanshin Tigers (1998)

Desi Bernard Wilson (born May 9, 1969) is an American former professional baseball player. He played part of one season in Major League Baseball for the San Francisco Giants in 1996, primarily as a first baseman. He also played one season in Japan with the Hanshin Tigers in 1998. He is currently the hitting coach of the Iowa Cubs, an affiliate of the Chicago Cubs.

== Amateur career ==
Desi Wilson played basketball and baseball for Fairleigh Dickinson University.

== Professional career ==
Wilson was originally drafted by the Texas Rangers in the 1991 amateur draft. In 1994, he was traded to the Giants, along with Rich Aurilia, for pitcher John Burkett.

Wilson played part of one season on the 1996 Giants, with a .271 batting average over 41 games. He also played in Japan for the Hanshin Tigers in 1998.

Wilson played in the affiliated minor leagues until 2002, then went on to play in the independent leagues until 2007. Overall, he hit .312 in his minor league career. In 2005, while playing for the Surprise Fightin' Falcons, Desi had a 30-game hitting streak and batted .411, setting a Golden Baseball League record.

== Post-playing career ==
In 2007, Wilson began the season As the manager of the Anderson Joes of the independent South Coast League. Midway through the season, he left the position of manager and was activated as a player. He was then traded to the South Georgia Peanuts where he served as a player-coach for the remainder of the season and was part of the club's SCL championship. He joined the Cubs organization in 2009 as a hitting coach, joining Daytona in 2012. He was promoted to the hitting coach of the Tennessee Smokies in 2013.

== Personal life ==
Wilson is the father of basketball player D. J. Carton. They have not communicated since Carton was age three or four.
