= Victoria Capitals =

Logo
Cap insignia

Information
- League: Canadian Baseball League
- Location: Victoria, British Columbia
- Ballpark: Royal Athletic Park
- Founded: 2003
- Folded: 2004
- League championships: 0
- Division championships: 0
- Former name(s): Victoria Capitals (2003)
- Colours: Black, Teal, Maroon, White

The Victoria Capitals were members of the Canadian Baseball League that lasted two months before the league ceased operations in 2003.

The team featured former Toronto Blue Jays pitcher Steve Sinclair and were managed by former Atlanta Braves shortstop Andres Thomas. The Capitals played out of Royal Athletic Park and led the league in attendance, averaging around 1,700 fans per game. Due to a highly receptive community, the Capitals were able to attract fans by combining local business sponsorship with affordable family entertainment. Unfortunately, the other teams in the league did not receive such a response. The league was forced to halt play in the middle of the 2003 season after new league owner Jeff Mallett (part owner of the San Francisco Giants and co-founder of Yahoo) decided the league business model was destined for failure. Although the intent was to restart the league in 2004, the league's assets were eventually sold off and play was never resumed.

In 2004, the Victoria Royals were formed and featured some of the players and management of the Capitals. Unlike the Capitals, the Royals were a semi-pro team featuring college players from both Canada and the United States. There was a strong local presence, as many of the players and coaches were originally from Victoria. Local players included Curtis Pelletier, Matt Gunning, Steve Bailey, Kyle Swenson, Joel Perkins, Christian Winstanley, Graham Campbell, Bryan Allen, Gautam Srivastava, Henry Mabee, Bobby Rebner and Shawn Loglisci. Coached by Marty Hall and Daryn Lansdell, the Royals had a good season winning the PWL crown. Also, unlike the Capitals, the Royals finished their season, playing teams from Washington, British Columbia, and Alberta. At the end of the season, management decided that the return of the Royals was unlikely for 2005, due to lack of support from the local business community. From the end of the season in 2004, Victoria was without pro baseball until 2008, when the Victoria Seals of the Golden Baseball League played their inaugural game.
