= Victoria Seals =

Logo	Cap insignia

Information
- League: Golden Baseball League (North Division)
- Location: Victoria, British Columbia
- Ballpark: Royal Athletic Park (capacity 4,247)
- Founded: 2008
- Folded: 2010
- League championships: None
- Division championships: None
- Former name: Victoria Seals (2009–2010)
- Colours: Navy blue, red, white
- Ownership: Russ Parker, Darren Parker
- General manager: Roxann Bury
- Manager: Kip Gross (Interim)
- Media: Victoria Times-Colonist
- Website: www.victoriaseals.ca

The Victoria Seals were a professional baseball team based in Victoria, British Columbia. The Seals were a member of the North Division of the independent Golden Baseball League, which is not affiliated with either Major League Baseball (MLB) or Minor League Baseball. They joined the GBL on October 1, 2008. The Seals played their home games at Royal Athletic Park, a multipurpose stadium in Victoria which is also used for soccer, softball and football. On November 10, 2010, team owners Russ and Darren Parker announced that the team would be ceasing operations immediately after being unable to reach an agreement with the City of Victoria on the condition of the ballpark and the instability of the Golden Baseball League.

The rights to the franchise were purchased by Westpro Productions and were going to be relocated to Fort McMurray, Alberta but that never occurred because the North American League folded.

== Attendance ==
The Seals inaugural season boasted impressive attendance figures, with an average draw of 2,388 per game, good enough for second best in the GBL. Furthermore, average capacity was 53%, which was the highest overall capacity total in the league. By contrast, these numbers were higher than the GBL's other Canadian teams, the Calgary Vipers and the Edmonton Capitals, in both capacity percentage and total attendance. The Seals also missed a sellout by only 19 people on their final game of the 2009 season, with 4228 fans in attendance. They drew 10,045 fans on their final (three-game) home-stand, bringing their total attendance for 2009 to 93,691 fans.

Attendance improved in 2010 and the Seals drew 116,872 fans in 45 home dates at Royal Athletic Park. Their average attendance (2,597 per game) was third best in the ten-team league. The single-game attendance record for the franchise was set on Tuesday July 27, 2010 when 4,753 fans turned out to see Eri Yoshida pitch.

== Ownership ==
The Seals are owned by Russ Parker and his son Darren. Russ is the former owner of the Class AAA Pacific Coast League's Calgary Cannons (now the Albuquerque Isotopes). He is also the long-time owner of the Regina Pats hockey team of the Western Hockey League.

== On-field staff ==
On November 25, 2008, the Seals named former MLB infielder Darrell Evans as their first manager. Before joining the Seals, Evans was the first manager of the Long Beach Armada from 2005 to 2007, and last served as batting coach for the Orange County Flyers, who won the GBL title in 2008. On March 4, 2010, Evans was fired as manager of the Seals after being discovered to have "solicited employment with another team". That team is believed to be the Palm Springs Chill of the California Winter League.

On March 8, 2010, the Seals announced the hiring of former Major League All-Star Bret Boone as their new manager. Boone is no stranger to the Pacific Northwest, having played for the nearby Seattle Mariners for several seasons during his major league career.

Joining Bret Boone in 2010 as members of the Seals' on-field staff are former major-leaguer Kip Gross as pitching coach, and second-year Seals catcher Josh Arhart, who along with regular playing duties will also serve as bench coach.

On May 27, 2010, the Seals announced that Bret Boone had resigned from his position as field manager in order to deal with a personal family issue. Boone managed the team to a 3–2 record during his short stint with the club. It was further announced that pitching coach Kip Gross took on Boone's duties as field manager. Infielder Brian Rios also took on duties as a player/coach.

== Seals' demise and ownership change ==
On November 10, 2010, team owners Russ and Darren Parker announced that the team would be ceasing operations immediately after being unable to reach an agreement with the City of Victoria on the condition of the ballpark and the instability of the Golden Baseball League. The GBL would later merge with the Northern League and United League Baseball to form the North American League.

== Fort McMurray North American League team ==
On October 14, 2011, it was announced that the North American League granted Fort McMurray, Alberta, a new franchise. The ownership group, Westpro Productions, led by Craig Tkachuk (former general manager of the Edmonton Capitals), bought the rights to the original Seals franchise from the Parkers. However, Tkachuk admitted that MacDonald Island Park would not be ready for play in 2012 and the team could start their run as strictly a road team. The North American League has since folded.

== Roster ==
2010 Opening day roster as of May 21, 2010

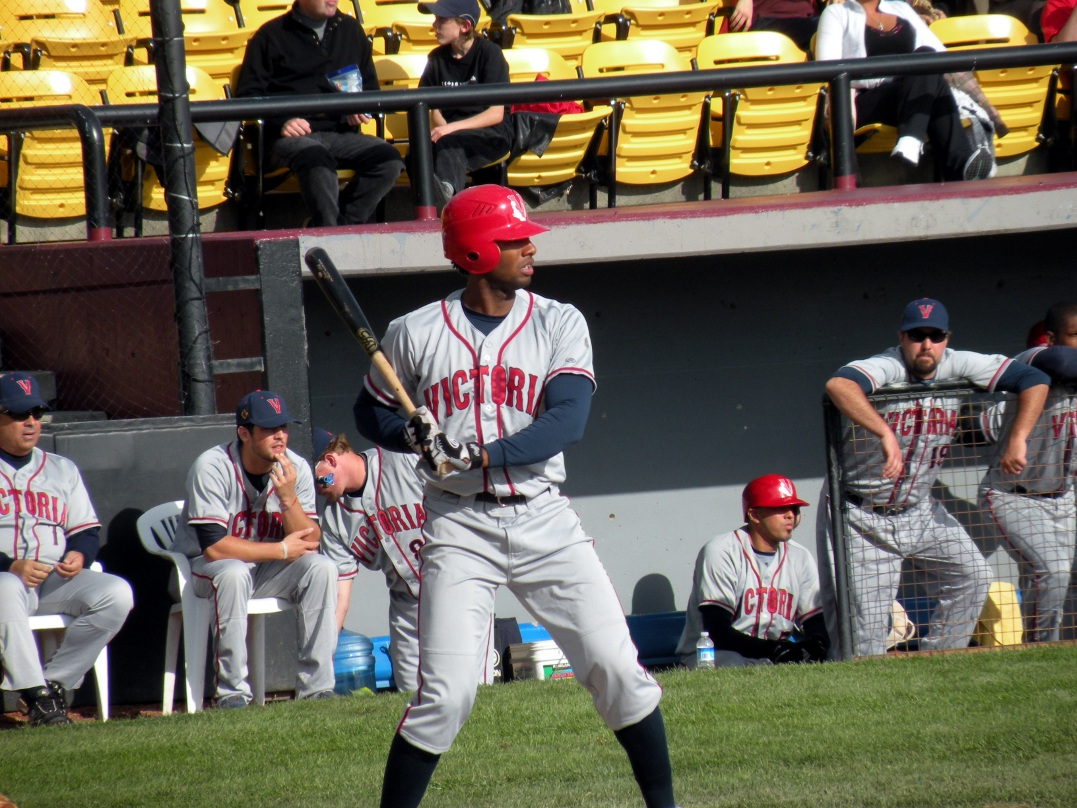
Jamar Hill bats during the team's inaugural season

- LHP Jason Kershner
- LHP Jino Gonzalez
- LHP Nick Martin
- RHP Aaron Easton
- RHP Aaron Trolia
- RHP Andrew Arreola
- RHP Anthony Pluta
- RHP Brandon Villafuerte
- RHP Chris Bodishbaugh
- RHP Kyle Wilson

- OF Chris van Rossum
- OF Colin Moro
- OF Sean Smith
- OF Steven Wright
- OF Terrance McClain
- IF Brian Rios (player/coach)
- IF Charlie Standlund
- IF Eric Pringle
- IF Shane Cronin
- IF Wilver Perez
- C Josh Arhart (bench coach)
- C Matt Kavanaugh

== Seals players signed by Major League organizations ==
2009:

- Austin Bibens-Dirkx (Chicago Cubs)
- Isaac Hess (Boston Red Sox)

2010

- Sergio Pedroza (Los Angeles Dodgers)
- Chris Bodishbaugh (Chicago White Sox)
- Anthony Pluta (Los Angeles Angels)

== Seals players who went on to appear in Major Leagues ==
2011

- Dane De La Rosa (Tampa Bay Rays) - signed by Rays after being traded away by Victoria

== History of baseball in Victoria ==
Baseball has a long and distinguished history in the city of Victoria dating back to the mid-19th century. Many amateur and professional teams from many different leagues have called the city their home over the years, including a New York Yankees farm team called the Victoria Athletics from 1946 to 1951.

=== Past Victoria baseball teams ===
Sources:

- Victoria Olympic Club (1866)
- Victoria James Bays (1886)
- Victoria Amity Club (1887)
- Victoria Baseball Club (1892–1901)
- Victoria Islanders (1911)
- Victoria Bees (1911–1914)
- Victoria Maple Leafs (1915)
- Victoria Capitals (1920–1921)
- Victoria Athletics (WIL) (1946–1951)
- Victoria Tyees (WIL) (1952)
- Victoria Mussels (NWL) (1978–1979)
- Victoria Blues (NWL) (1980)
- Victoria Capitals (CBL) (2003)
- Victoria Royals (Pacific International League/Northwest Major League) (2004)

== See also ==
- Fort McMurray North American League team
