= Surprise Recreation Campus =

Athletic facility in Surprise, Arizona

Coordinates: 33.628931°N 112.377431°W

The Surprise Recreation Campus is an athletic facility based in Surprise, Arizona, built in 2002. Its amenities include Surprise Stadium (the spring training home of Major League Baseball's Kansas City Royals and Texas Rangers), twelve baseball fields (six lighted) and Mark Coronado Park, an 8-acre (32,000 m^{2}) multipurpose field (lighted).

The facility at one time played host to an independent professional baseball team, the Golden Baseball League's Surprise Fightin' Falcons, and a minor league baseball team, the Surprise Rafters of the Arizona Fall League. The stadium is now home of the Surprise Saguaros.

The recreation campus hosts an annual Christmas event, Sparkling Surprise, that features food trucks, hot air balloons, sky divers, vendors and live music.

In 2023, the campus hosted the Bases and Brews Music Festival to mark the end of the year’s Cactus League spring training.

== Reference links ==
- Surprise, Arizona official website
