= George Cumbie =

American politician

- Born: September 15, 1921; Yell County, Arkansas
- Died: October 19, 1990 (aged 69); Surprise, Arizona
- Burial place: El Mirage, Arizona
- Occupations: Mayor; Farm Contractor; Road crewman

Mayor of Surprise, Arizona
- In office April 1969 – June 1989
- Preceded by: Grover King
- Succeeded by: Roy Villanueva

George Cumbie was the fourth mayor of Surprise, Arizona, serving two decades in the role from 1969 to 1989.

== Early life ==
George Floyd Cumbie was born on September 15, 1921 in Yell County, Arkansas to sharecroppers.

Coming from an already low income household and with the onset of the Great Depression, Cumbie dropped out of school after third grade to work in cotton fields with his parents. In the mid 1930's Cumbie's parents, looking for new opportunity, decided to move to California, packing their belongings and children into their truck. The group would break down in the west valley, near Surprise, Arizona.

While serving in the military during World War II, Cumbie would send his pay to his parents in order for them to buy plots of land for themselves and their children. At this time, land had to be purchased directly from Surprise's founder, Flora Mae Statler.

== Personal life ==
Cumbie worked as a farm contractor, running a large cotton picking crew in Surprise. During seasonal breaks between harvests, he would work on road crews. Cumbie would build his home, moving in while under construction, and continuing to add on. Water had to be hauled to the house from a nearby farm well and the house would not have electricity until the early 1960's.

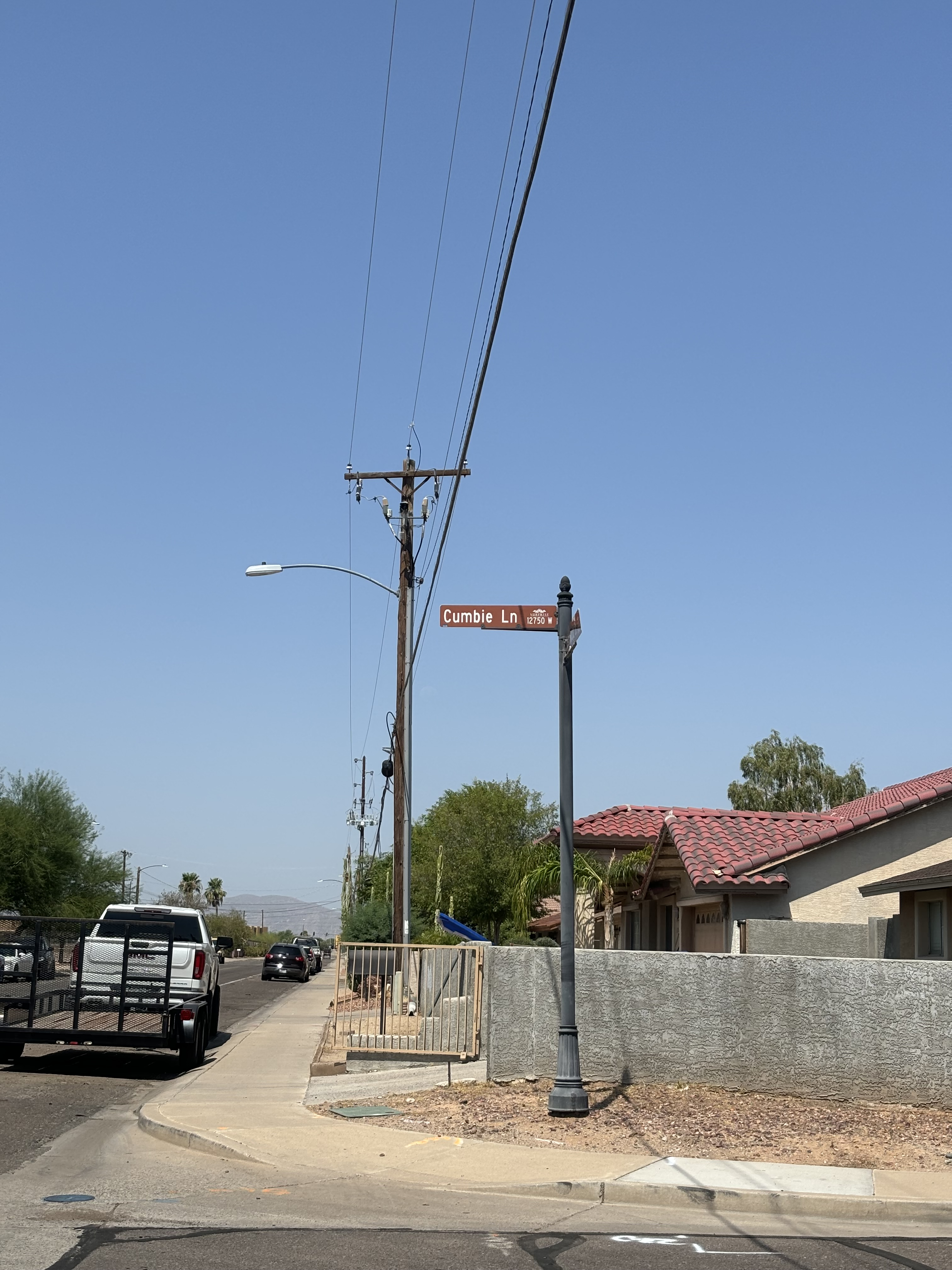
Cumbie Lane in Surprise, AZ.)

== Political career ==
Shortly after Surprise's incorporation in 1960, Cumbie was active in the community's government. He served on a subdivision committee, the zoning board, and an ad hoc water board. George Cumbie first ran for Surprise's city council in the December 1966 recall election, but lost. He would run again five months later in the May 1967 election and win a seat. He would ultimately be elected to eight terms as Surprise's mayor, serving for a span of 20 years. Cumbie is believed to be Arizona’s longest serving mayor.

In 1971, following a fatal car crash on the US 60 in Surprise, Cumbie pushed for changes to be made to the highway. Throughout other parts of Arizona, such as neighboring Sun City, the highway had been divided, the speed limit had been lowered, and several lights installed. Cumbie hoped to drastically decrease the number of fatalities along the roadway by making such improvements in Surprise.

In 1975, Cumbie was tired of the city's dirt roads, and decided to pave almost all of the fifty dirt roads. Cumbie had previously worked in road construction and paved the roads himself and at no cost to the city. Cumbie would rent or borrow equipment from the company he worked for, then he would buy the necessary materials and hire a crew. Cumbie would donate his time on weekends to oversee the job.

After being elected to his eighth term as mayor in 1985, he announced that this would be his last as mayor, but he would continue to run for city council.

In July 1987, following firing of City manager Harold Yingling, Cumbie faced a recall by citizens who felt that he was acting in his own interest rather than for the interests of the city. Several members of the council backed these claims and signed petitions for the recall. He faced further scrutiny, after records of his phone bill were released with his average office phone bill being roughly $100, while other city official's bill rarely went over $30. The recall ultimately failed, after new city manager, Nick Bacon, determined there were not enough petition signatures, after disqualifying over eighty for several reasons.

Cumbie did not receive enough votes in the 1989 election to retain a seat on the city council.

=== Controversy ===
Cumbie faced much backlash during his time as mayor of Surprise. These critiques of his leadership centered around perceived misuses of his political power.

In 1974, Cumbie and many of his close friends, some of whom also served on the city council formed the Surprise Sheriff's Posse. Residents quickly began to feel that the overlap between posse members and council members were a conflict of interest, especially for Cumbie as mayor. The Sheriff's Posse seemed to receive preferencial treatment to other groups from the city council. The posse was granted sole operating power of the concession stand at the community park. While the funds raised at this stand allowed the posse to purchase essential resources for their search and rescue missions, many believed other local organizations should be able use the facility for their own fundraising efforts. The posse also built the city's rodeo grounds, however, the organization began construction without explicit and direct approval from the council. Residents began to question the candor and integrity of the council as well as its close and largely overlapping relationship with the Sheriff's Posse.

Cumbie also appointed many of his close friends and allies to city roles, despite frequent lack of experience. In 1987, the mayor removed Jerry Gaines as the head of the Parks and Recreation Department, as well as Harold Yingling as City Manager. He would then appoint friends with no experience to these roles, leading to public outcry and dissatisfaction, and a recall attempt. These events are largely credited for Cumbie's downfall in the 1989 election.

== Death and legacy ==
George Cumbie died on October 19, 1990 as a result of a stroke two days earlier. He was running to once again join the city council, still on the ballot that November as part of a recall he called for. He ultimately lost the election by sixty votes.

He is remembered for his dedication to the city of Surprise, specifically for paving a majority of the city's street after becoming Mayor. Cumbie Lane in Surprise is named for him and his family, where they lived in the original townsite.
