= Golden Baseball League =

North American independent baseball league

- Golden Baseball League logo
- Sport: Baseball
- Founded: 2004
- First season: 2005
- Folded: 2010 (merged with ULB and NoL)
- No. of teams: 6 (as of November 2010)
- Countries: USA; Canada; Mexico
- Last champion: Chico Outlaws
- Most titles: Chico Outlaws (2)

The Golden Baseball League (GBL) was an independent baseball league based in San Ramon, California, with teams located in the Western United States, Western Canada, and northwest Mexico.

The GBL was not affiliated with Major League Baseball (MLB) or the organized Minor League Baseball system, but has featured players with MLB experience (Rickey Henderson, Jose Canseco, Alex Arias, Bud Smith, Desi Wilson, José Lima, Hideki Irabu, Junior Spivey, and Mark Prior). It was formed in 2004 and began play on May 26, 2005.

The GBL's presenting partner was Safeway Inc. Other investors in the GBL included Wheel of Fortune host Pat Sajak, former National Football League players Mike Sherrard and Christian Okoye, and executives from Cisco Systems, Taleo, and Draper Fisher Jurvetson.

Over 100 players were sold to MLB organizations after it began play, with seven players already making it to an MLB uniform – Dane De La Rosa, Adam Pettyjohn, Scott Richmond, Chris Jakubauskas, Sergio Romo, Bobby Cramer, and Daniel Nava.

The Golden Baseball League combined with United League Baseball and the Northern League into a new North American League for the 2011 season to form the first nationwide independent professional baseball league. However, the North American League folded after two seasons.

== History ==
The league was founded in 2004 by Stanford University graduates Dave Kaval and Amit Patel. Kaval was the president and chief executive officer (Patel departed after the 2008 season to run his family business conglomerate in Laurel, Mississippi). Brian MacInnes was the president, and Bill Weiss was the league's secretary and historian.

Many former MLB coaches and players coached or managed in the GBL, including Kip Gross, Les Lancaster, Mike Marshall, Ozzie Virgil, Jr., Darrell Evans, Garry Templeton, Cory Snyder, Jeffrey Leonard, Gary Carter, Mike Busch, Steve Yeager, Phil Nevin, Charlie Hough, Mark Parent, Tim Johnson, Terry Kennedy, Paul Abbott, Brett Boone, Alex Arias, Rusty Meacham, and Warren Cromartie.

=== The beginning ===
The league began with a single-entity model whereby the league owned all the clubs (except Tijuana and Japan, which were partnerships). Since then, several of the clubs have been sold to private groups.

In its inaugural season, the league was composed of eight teams: the Chico Outlaws, Fullerton Flyers, Long Beach Armada, and San Diego Surf Dawgs in California; Mesa Miners, Surprise Fightin' Falcons, and Yuma Scorpions in Arizona; and the Japan Samurai Bears. All teams played their home games in city- and university-owned stadiums, with the exception of the Samurai Bears, a traveling team of Japanese players that played all of its games on the road. The Japanese team was a late entry, as were the Tijuana Toros, who led all of minor league baseball in attendance at over 13,000 fans a game, had jumped from the Mexican League to the GBL in December to be a charter member of the league, only to learn that the government of the Mexican state of Baja California would not permit this.

Three of the GBL's teams, Long Beach, Chico and Yuma, operated in cities that once hosted Western Baseball League teams, which operated from 1995 to 2002.

On May 9, 2005, MLB's all-time stolen base leader, Rickey Henderson, signed a contract to play the 2005 season with the Surf Dawgs.

The 2005 season ended with a four-team championship tournament on Labor Day weekend. The tournament ended with San Diego winning two games on the final day, knocking off Mesa in the second game to win the title.

José Canseco, another retired star, signed with the Surf Dawgs in 2006 as part of his attempt to return to baseball and promote his book, Juiced, along with its upcoming movie adaptation. Canseco was traded to the Armada after only one game. He said that the move was to be closer to his daughter.

=== Season 2: League Contracts ===
Before the 2006 season, Surprise was discontinued, while Mesa moved to Reno, another former Western League city, and became the Reno Silver Sox, the first GBL club in Nevada. The league moved to a six-team format and did not have the traveling Samurai Bears return.

=== League expands to Utah and Canada ===
Prior to the 2007 season, the San Diego Surf Dawgs operation was discontinued as San Diego State breached the lease agreement with the league and subsequently paid a settlement. The GBL remained at six teams by adding the St. George RoadRunners. The Utah city also hosted a Western League club from 1999 to 2001, the Zion Pioneerzz, becoming the fifth former WBL city to join the league.

In 2008, two former Northern League clubs, the Calgary Vipers and Edmonton Cracker-Cats, joined the GBL, becoming the loop's first two Canadian teams.

The league expanded to nine teams in 2009 with the addition of the Victoria Seals, while the Reno Silver Sox moved to Tucson to become the Toros. The Cracker-Cats were sold to Edmonton Oilers owner Daryl Katz and renamed the Edmonton Capitals for the 2009 season.

=== Tijuana joins league in 2009 and will play in 2010 ===
On December 15, 2008, the league signed a letter of intent to place another expansion franchise in Tijuana, Mexico. After the addition of the expansion Tijuana Potros on January 13, the Armada were moved to the North Division. The Potros themselves would postpone the season due to the swine flu outbreak in Mexico. This made all their scheduled games days off for the other nine teams and left their GBL future in serious doubt.

As planned, the Tijuana team did return for the 2010 season, but came back with a new name and additional owners. The Tijuana Cimarrones were announced as a member of the GBL when the schedule was released on January 15, 2010.

=== Yuma becomes a Colombian affiliation in 2009 ===
On May 20, 2009, the Yuma Sun reported that the team had signed an affiliation agreement with the Colombian Professional Baseball League (CPBL). Under the terms of the affiliation, the CPBL was to handle all on-field personnel and player issues while the team would retain control of promotions, concessions, and other front-office business. The Scorpions would act as a showcase team for players from all four CPBL teams.

Yuma Scorpion Reynaldo Rodriguez, of Cartagena, Colombia, was named GBL 2009 Rookie of the Year, the top prospect in all the independent leagues by Baseball America, and had his contract purchased by the Boston Red Sox.

=== Maui announced for 2010, Long Beach suspended ===
On September 30, 2009, the GBL announced that the Hawaiian sports and entertainment company XnE Inc. had purchased the territory rights to place teams in Hawaii and that their inaugural team would play at the War Memorial Complex in Maui in 2010. The team announced their name as Na Koa Ikaika Maui, which means the Strong Warriors of Maui.

The Long Beach Armada announced that they were suspending operations due to an ongoing stadium lease dispute with the city of Long Beach.

=== Kaval leaves GBL for MLS, league to expand east ===
Dave Kaval, co-founder and CEO of the GBL since its inception in 2005, resigned to take the job as team president of the San Jose Earthquakes of Major League Soccer.

The United League and the Northern League agreed to join the GBL for the 2011 season in the formation of the new North American League (NAL). The Rockford RiverHawks, Schaumburg Flyers, Joliet Jackhammers, and Lake County Fielders planned on leaving the Northern League to join the GBL for 2011 with the new format. United League teams joining the NAL include the Edinburg Roadrunners, Harlingen Whitewings and San Angelo Colts.

== Drug testing ==
The league was the only independent baseball association to have drug testing. The league CEO Dave Kaval explained:

"I feel that there is no place for illegal drugs in our business. We run a family-friendly operation off the field, and illegal drug usage by our players would undermine the trust we have established with our fans. That is exactly what has happened at the MLB level. As a steward of the great game of baseball, I am proud to say that we have the most stringent drug policy in all of professional baseball."

== Franchises that played ==
Golden Baseball League
Team	Founded	City	Stadium	Capacity	Notes
Calgary Vipers	2005	Calgary, Alberta	Foothills Stadium	6,000	Joined league from the Northern League in 2008, folded in 2011
Chico Outlaws	2005	Chico, California	Nettleton Stadium	4,200	Charter team, only team to win two GBL titles, joined the NAL in 2010, folded in 2012
Edmonton Capitals	2005	Edmonton, Alberta	Telus Field	10,000	Joined league from the Northern League in 2005, folded in 2011
Fullerton Flyers/Orange County Flyers	2005	Fullerton, California	Goodwin Field	12,623	Charter team, joined the NAL in 2010, joined the American West Baseball League in 2013, then left that league
Japan Samurai Bears	2005	Japan	Traveling Team	N/A	Charter team, played only season in 2005 before folding
Long Beach Armada	2005	Long Beach, California	Blair Field	3,283	Charter team, folded in 2010 after stadium issues
Mesa Miners	2005	Mesa, Arizona	HoHoKam Park	12,623	Charter team, folded after only one season
Na Koa Ikaika Maui	2009	Wailuku, Hawaii	Maehara Stadium	4,100	The team moved to the Pacific Association of Professional Baseball Clubs in 2012 and folded one year later in 2013.
Reno Silver Sox	2006	Reno, Nevada	William Peccole Park	3,000	Relocated to Tucson, Arizona and became the Tucson Toros in 2009
St. George RoadRunners	2007	St. George, Utah	Bruce Hurst Field	2,500	Team relocated to Henderson, Nevada and were to be a charter team for the NAL, but never played again, folded in 2012
San Diego Surf Dawgs	2005	San Diego, California	Tony Gwynn Stadium	3,000	Charter team, first-ever GBL champions, folded in 2007
Surprise Fightin' Falcons	2005	Surprise, Arizona	Surprise Recreation Campus	Unknown	Charter team, folded after only one season
Tijuana Cimarrones	2005	Tijuana, Baja California	Estadio Nacional de Tijuana	18,500	Formerly of Liga Mexicana de Béisbol, originally known as the Tijuana Potros, folded after only one season
Tucson Toros	1969	Tucson, Arizona	Hi Corbett Field	9,500	Formerly a member of the Triple-A Pacific Coast League, relocated from Reno, Nevada, returned to play in 2009, but folded in 2011
Victoria Seals	2008	Victoria, British Columbia	Royal Athletic Park	3,800	Folded in 2010
Yuma Scorpions	2005	Yuma, Arizona	Desert Sun Stadium	10,500	Charter team, folded after the 2012 season after two attempts to restart in different leagues

=== Teams that never played ===
- Tijuana Toros from Tijuana, Mexico – Stadium was seized by Mexican military forces in January 2005 and awarded to former politicians who had struck a deal to bring a team back to the Mexican Summer League. The GBL quickly responded by forming the Japan Samurai Bears to fill the Tijuana spot on the schedule. There was also the Tijuana Embajadores from Tijuana, Baja California.
- Santa Clarita, California – Awarded franchise in 2006, but ownership was unable to find or build a ballpark.
- Palm Springs, California - Awarded franchise in 2009, was expected to play in the 2012 season. The GBL and later NAL did not allow Palm Springs to have the team play in 2010 and 2011, due to Palm Springs Stadium's substandard facilities.

== Season-by-season results ==
=== 2005 ===
Standings

PL	California Division	W	L	GB	PL	Arizona Division	W	L	GB
1	San Diego-x	52	38	--	1	Mesa-x	51	39	--
2	Chico-y	49	41	3	2	Yuma	47	43	4
3	Long Beach-y	49	41	3	3	Surprise	45	45	6
4	Fullerton	34	56	18	4	Samurai Bears	33	57	18

x-Division Champion y-Wild Card (Division champions and top two wild card teams go to championship)

Playoffs and Championship (four-team double-elimination, final two teams face in one-game playoff):

Game 1	SAN DIEGO 9 Chico 0
Game 2	MESA 8 Long Beach 0
Game 3	CHICO 7 Long Beach 5 (Long Beach eliminated)
Game 4	MESA 2 San Diego 0
Game 5	SAN DIEGO 2 Chico 1 (Chico eliminated)
Championship Game	SAN DIEGO 9 Mesa 6 (San Diego wins championship)
MVP	Cody Clark, San Diego

Awards:

Year	Most Valuable Player	Pitcher of the Year	Rookie of the Year	Rookie Pitcher of the Year	Manager of the Year	Executive of the Year
2005	Desi Wilson, 1B/OF, Surprise	Grant Gregg, LHP, Chico	Nick Guerra, C/3B, San Diego	Manny Ayala, RHP, Mesa	Terry Kennedy, San Diego	Bob Linscheid, Chico

Gold Glove winners: Pitcher: Adam Pettyjohn, Long Beach Catcher: Cody Clark, San Diego First base: Yuji Nerei, Samurai Bears Second base: Kenichi Miura, Samurai Bears Third base: Sean Walsh, Fullerton Shortstop: Jeremy Hernandez, Long Beach Outfielders Marcus Knight, Mesa; Billy Brown, Surprise; Travis McAndrews, Long Beach

=== 2006 season ===
Standings:

PL	1st Half Standings	W	L	GB	PL	2nd Half Standings	W	L	GB
1	Reno-z	25	15	--	1	Fullerton-x	26	14	--
2	Chico	22	18	3	2	Chico	24	16	2
3	Long Beach	22	18	3	3	Reno	22	18	4
4	Yuma	18	22	7	4	San Diego	19	21	7
5	Fullerton	17	23	8	5	Long Beach	15	25	11
6	San Diego	16	24	9	6	Yuma	14	26	12

z-First-half champion and best overall record, x-second-half champion (Champions of each half face in 5-game series for championship. If one team wins both halves, the team with next best overall record receives championship bid.)

Championship (best of 5 game series):

Game 1	RENO 11 Fullerton 4
Game 2	RENO 5 Fullerton 4
Game 3	FULLERTON 9 Reno 5
Game 4	RENO 5 Fullerton 3 (Reno wins championship)
MVP	Doug Gredvig, Reno

Awards:

Year	Most Valuable Player	Pitcher of the Year	Rookie of the Year	Rookie Pitcher of the Year	Manager of the Year	Executive of the Year
2006	Peanut Williams, 1B/DH, Fullerton	Chris Jakubauskas, RHP, Fullerton	Matt Maloney, OF, San Diego	Phil Springman, RHP, Chico	Les Lancaster, Reno	Becca Hoffer, Chico

All-League Team: Catcher: Marcus Jensen, Reno First base: Desi Wilson, Chico Second base: Adam Mandel, San Diego Third base: Henry Calderon, Yuma Shortstop: Bret LeVier, Fullerton Utility: Craig Kuzmic, Chico Outfielders: Seth Pietsch, San Diego; Jason Van Meetren, Chico; Jeff LaRue, Long Beach; Scott Goodman, San Diego Designated hitter: Peanut Williams, Fullerton Starting Pitchers: Chris Jakubauskas, Fullerton; Andre Simpson, Long Beach; Ben Thurmond, Reno; Phil Springman, Chico; Brian Kroll, Chico; Nate Sevier, Reno Relief Pitchers: Josh Rummonds, San Diego; Scott Schneider, Reno; E.J. Shanks, San Diego; Mike Peck, Long Beach; Wes Faust, Fullerton

Gold Glove Winners: Pitcher: James Johnson, Reno Catcher: Marcus Jensen, Reno First base: Desi Wilson, Chico Second base: Rob Gandolfo, Chico Third base: Henry Calderon, Yuma Shortstop: Hector Tena, Yuma Outfielders Chris Klemm, Long Beach; Lino Garcia, Chico; Ryan Webb, Long Beach

=== 2007 season ===
Standings:

PL	1st Half Standings	W	L	GB	PL	2nd Half Standings	W	L	GB
1	Chico-x	25	13	--	1	Long Beach-z	25	13	--
2	Long Beach	23	15	2	2	Yuma	21	17	4
3	Yuma	21	17	4	3	Chico	19	19	6
4	Orange County	19	19	6	4	Orange County	18	20	7
5	Reno	18	20	7	5	St. George	16	22	9
6	St. George	7	31	18	6	Reno	15	23	10

x-1st half champion, z-2nd half champion and best overall record

Championship (best of 5 game series):

Game 1	CHICO 10 Long Beach 4
Game 2	CHICO 12 Long Beach 8
Game 3	LONG BEACH 7 Chico 5
Game 4	CHICO 6 Long Beach 1 (Chico wins championship)
MVP	Scott Dragicevich, Chico

Awards:

Year	Most Valuable Player	Pitcher of the Year	Rookie of the Year	Rookie Pitcher of the Year	Executive of the Year
2007	Daniel Nava, OF, Chico	Todd Gelatka, RHP, Chico	Kane Simmons, OF, Reno	Dustin Gober, RHP, Long Beach	Curt Jacey, Reno

All-League Team: Catcher: Buddy Morales, Orange County First base: Jaime Martinez, Long Beach Second base: David Bacani, Orange County Third base: Henry Calderon, Yuma Shortstop: Jesse Kovacs, Chico Utility: Ryan Stevenson, St. George Outfielders: Daniel Nava, Chico; Kane Simmons, Reno; Johnny Kaplan, Long Beach Yosvanny Almario, Yuma Designated hitter: Peanut Williams, Orange County Starting Pitchers: Ben Fox, Orange County; Derek Loop, Chico; Ryan Claypool, Long Beach; Roger Luque, Yuma; Dusty Bergman, Reno Relief Pitchers: Todd Gelatka, Chico; Dane De La Rosa, Long Beach; Anthony Pluta, St. George; Neil Hayes, Yuma

=== 2008 season ===
Overall Standings:

PL	North Division Standings	W	L	Winning %	GB	PL	South Division Standings	W	L	Winning %	GB
1	Edmonton-y	51	37	.580	--	1	Orange County-x	51	35	.593	--
2	Calgary-x	45	42	.517	5½	2	Yuma	48	40	.545	4
3	Chico	34	52	.395	16	3	Long Beach-y	47	40	.540	4½
4	Reno	30	58	.341	21	4	St. George	43	45	.489	9

x-1st half division champion, y-2nd half division champion

2008 All-Star Game:

- 2008 - United League Baseball All-Stars 8, Golden Baseball League All-Stars 5 (July 15, 2008, San Angelo, Texas)

Northern Division Playoff (best of 5 game series):

Game 1	CALGARY 8, Edmonton 4
Game 2	CALGARY 8, Edmonton 2
Game 3	Edmonton 1, CALGARY 8 (Calgary wins series 3-0)

Southern Division Playoff (best of 5 game series):

Game 1	ORANGE COUNTY 4, Long Beach 2
Game 2	Orange County 4, LONG BEACH 5
Game 3	LONG BEACH 13, Orange County 4
Game 4	Long Beach 3, ORANGE COUNTY 4
Game 5	Long Beach 2, ORANGE COUNTY 12 (Orange County wins series 3-2)

Championship (best of 5 game series):

Game 1	Orange County 5, CALGARY 6
Game 2	ORANGE COUNTY 13, Calgary 1
Game 3	Calgary 9, ORANGE COUNTY 14
Game 4	CALGARY 9, Orange County 1
Game 5	Calgary 9, ORANGE COUNTY 10 (Flyers win Championship)
Series MVP	Josh Arhart, Orange County

Awards:

Year	Safeway Most Valuable Player	Pitcher of the Year	Rookie of the Year	Rookie Pitcher of the Year	Manager of the Year	Executive of the Year
2008	Patrick Breen (Orange County)	Trevor Caughey (Chico)	Colin Moro (Calgary)	Ben Shockey (Chico)	Gary Carter (Orange County)	TBA

All-League Team: Catcher: TBA First base: TBA Second base: TBA Third base: TBA Shortstop: TBA Utility: TBA Outfielders: TBA Designated hitter: TBA Starting Pitchers: TBA Relief Pitchers: TBA

=== 2009 season ===
Overall Standings:

PL	North Division Standings	W	L	Winning %	GB	PL	South Division Standings	W	L	Winning %	GB
1	Calgary-x, y	49	27	.645	--	1	St. George-x	48	34	.585	--
2	Edmonton-z	44	38	.537	8	2	Long Beach	40	36	.526	5
3	Chico	33	44	.429	16½	3	Tucson-y	38	35	.521	5½
4	Victoria	32	50	.390	20	4	Orange County	37	39	.487	8
5						5	Yuma	29	47	.382	16

x-1st half division champion, y-2nd half division champion, z-wild card

Northern Division Playoff (best of 5 game series):

Game 1	CALGARY 15, Edmonton 4
Game 2	CALGARY 7, Edmonton 3
Game 3	EDMONTON 13, Calgary 6
Game 4	Edmonton 7, CALGARY 8 (Calgary wins series 3-1)

Southern Division Playoff (best of 5 game series):

Game 1	TUCSON 9, St. George 4
Game 2	ST. GEORGE 6, Tucson 3
Game 3	ST. GEORGE 1, Tucson 0
Game 4	St. George 1, TUCSON 5
Game 5	St. George 4, TUCSON 5 (Tucson wins series 3-2)

Championship (best of 5 game series):

Game 1	CALGARY 9, Tucson 8
Game 2	CALGARY 11, Tucson 4
Game 3	TUCSON 12, Calgary 1
Game 4	Tucson 10, CALGARY 18 (Calgary wins championship)
Series MVP	Sergio Pedroza (Calgary)

Awards:

Year	Player of the Year	Pitcher of the Year	Rookie of the Year	Rookie Pitcher of the Year	Manager of the Year	Executive of the Year
2009	Nelson Castro (Calgary)	Matt Durbin (Orange County)	Reynaldo Rodriquez (Yuma)	Mikael Ryder (Chico)	Morgan Burkhart (Calgary)	Darren Parker (Victoria)

Attendance (paid):

Team	Total	Average
Tucson	139,149	3,661
Victoria	93,691	2,342
Chico	89,276	2,177
Edmonton	84,813	2,174
Calgary	54,910	1,525
Long Beach	54,931	1,408
Yuma	41,578	1,259
St. George	44,417	1,168
Orange County	28,344	944

== All-star game ==
=== 2006 GBL All-Star Game ===
The GBL played their very first All-Star Game on July 18, 2006 at Chico's Nettleton Stadium pitting the North All-Stars against the South All-Stars.

=== 2008 United League vs. Golden League All-Star Game ===
The GBL reached a two-year agreement with the United League to face off in two All-Star Games. The 2008 game was hosted by the ULB's San Angelo Colts, while the 2009 game was to be hosted by the Orange County Flyers. However, the United League went bankrupt in the off-season after 2008, causing the 2009 All-Star Game to be cancelled.

=== 2009 Golden League All-Star Game ===
In replacement of the 2009 All-Star Game against the United League, the GBL held its own All-Star Game. The game was between the two divisions, taking place in St. George, Utah - home of the RoadRunners, on Tuesday, July 14. During the game, pitchers Donnie Brandt and Isaac Hess were purchased by major league organizations during the game by Milwaukee and Boston respectively. Fehlandt Lentini won the home run derby.

=== 2010 and 2011 GBL All-Star Games ===
On December 9, 2009 the GBL and the Northern League announced a two-year agreement that would pit the all-stars of the two leagues against each other in the mid-summer classic. The 2010 game wAS in Tucson on July 14 while the leagues will face off in Zion, Illinois at the newest ballpark (currently under construction) in the Northern League.

== GBL Instructional/Developmental Leagues ==
The GBL, then later the North American League, featured two small instructional leagues that helped produce future independent, minor league and even Major League Baseball standouts, including two-time World Series Champion Sergio Romo of the San Francisco Giants. These leagues folded with the NAL in 2013.

=== Arizona Winter League ===
On November 15, 2006, the Golden Baseball League announced the Arizona Winter League, which would be a short-season instructional league for its summer league. The league began play on January 19, 2007. The Arizona Winter League has just completed its third season. In the first three years, over 130 Arizona Winter League players have been signed to professional contracts. Two of those players, Scott Richmond and Sergio Romo, are now pitching in the major leagues. The 2009 Arizona Winter League began play on January 31, 2009 and has expanded to 8 teams and almost 200 players.

=== Arizona Summer League ===
On April 3, 2009, the Golden Baseball League announced its second instructional league known as the Arizona Summer League, which is patterned after the AWL. This league consists of three teams, the Canada Miners, El Centro Imperials and San Luis Atleticos and began play in late June 2009. The ASL had 12 players signed to pro contracts during the 2009 season.

The Bisbee Miners, Long Beach Armada and San Diego Surf Dawgs joined the ASL for the 2010 season.

== Television ==
The Yuma Scorpions became the first franchise in the league to broadcast select games on Adelphia Cable, which were produced by Arizona Western College Television Services. The Edmonton Capitals televised selected games by reaching an agreement with Shaw TV. The Golden Baseball League announced they had reached a deal with iBN Sports to broadcast 40 games on the internet showing various teams.
