= Japan Samurai Bears =

Japanese Baseball team

Logo
Cap insignia

Information
- League: Golden Baseball League (2005) (Arizona Division)
- Location: Japan
- Ballpark: none
- Founded: 2005
- Disbanded: 2006
- League championships: 0
- Division championships: 0
- Former name: Japan Samurai Bears (2005)
- Colors: Black, red, yellow, white
- Ownership: Golden Baseball League
- General manager: Thomas Bernhardt
- Manager: Warren Cromartie
- Media: none
- Website: www.seasonofthesamurai.com

The Japan Samurai Bears are a defunct professional baseball traveling team that played in the independent Golden Baseball League, which is not affiliated with either Major League Baseball or Minor League Baseball. They were based in the Arizona Division. The team, which existed for one season, played all of its games on the road in order to keep an even number of teams in the league.

The manager of the team was Warren Cromartie (a.k.a. "Cro"), an American who had played for a number of years in the Japanese Nippon Professional Baseball league. The team was almost entirely made of players from Japan, but did include some US-born players of Japanese descent to fill out the roster.

== Team history ==
The Samurai Bears were one of eight charter teams in the Golden Baseball League that began play in 2005 joining the likes of the Chico Outlaws, Fullerton Flyers, Long Beach Armada and San Diego Surf Dawgs of California; the Mesa Miners, Surprise Fightin' Falcons and Yuma Scorpions of Arizona. They were the first, and so far only, "traveling team" in league history. They replaced the Tijuana Toros, who were supposed to be one of the original eight teams, but who were unable to play due to the Baja California State Government seizing their stadium with police troops and turning it over to the Mexican League a few months before the start of the GBL season.

In their only season, the Samurai Bears finished last in the Arizona division with a league worst 33–57 record. Though the team struggled, there were some bright spots for the season. They had 3 pitchers (Hideki Nagasaka, Takaaki Igarashi, and Rentaro Seki) on the Arizona Division all-star team. First baseman Yuji Nerei was a Gold Glove winner and led the team in home runs and RBI, in addition to several other offensive categories. Pitcher Keisuke Ueno had his contract purchased by the Texas Rangers at the end of the season. Takaaki Igarashi still holds the single season GBL record for strikeouts and Rentaro Seki still holds the GBL single season record for shutouts.

In 2007, a documentary of the experience was released titled "Season of the Samurai." The documentary, directed by Matthew Asner and Danny Gold, looked at the on- and off-field experiences of the team, including an in-depth look at the challenging relationship with the coach. The film was made an official selection to the Santa Barbara Film Festival.The film also was selected as the opening film of The 11th annual Comedia at the Just For Laughs Festival in Montreal.

== Other logos ==
First team logo (2005)

Second team logo (2005)

Alternate Team Logo (2005)

== Team record ==
Season	W	L	Win %	Place	Playoff
2005	33	57	.367	4th, Arizona Division	Did not qualify
