= Kip Gross =

American baseball player (born 1964)

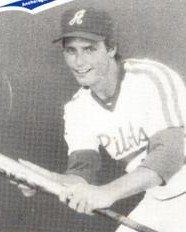
- Gross with the Anchorage Glacier Pilots in 1986
- Pitcher
- Born: August 24, 1964 (age 61); Scottsbluff, Nebraska, U.S.
- Batted: Right Threw: Right

Professional debut
- MLB: April 21, 1990, for the Cincinnati Reds
- NPB: May 26, 1994, for the Nippon-Ham Fighters

Last appearance
- NPB: October 7, 1998, for the Nippon-Ham Fighters
- MLB: May 29, 2000, for the Houston Astros

MLB statistics
- Win–loss record: 7–8
- Earned run average: 3.90
- Strikeouts: 81

NPB statistics
- Win–loss record: 55–49
- Earned run average: 3.60
- Strikeouts: 364
- Stats at Baseball Reference

Teams
- Cincinnati Reds (1990–1991); Los Angeles Dodgers (1992–1993); Nippon-Ham Fighters (1994–1998); Boston Red Sox (1999); Houston Astros (2000)

Kip Lee Gross (born August 24, 1964) is an American former professional baseball pitcher who played for the Cincinnati Reds, Los Angeles Dodgers, Nippon-Ham Fighters, Boston Red Sox and Houston Astros in Major League Baseball and Nippon Professional Baseball between 1990 and 2000.

== Biography ==
Gross was born in Scottsbluff, Nebraska, and played college baseball both at Murray State College (where he was drafted in the third round of the January draft) and the University of Nebraska–Lincoln. In 1985, he played collegiate summer baseball with the Hyannis Mets of the Cape Cod Baseball League. Gross was drafted by the New York Mets in the fourth round of the 1986 Major League Baseball draft. He played his first MLB game on April 21, 1990, with the Cincinnati Reds.

Gross played for four different ball clubs during his career: the Cincinnati Reds from 1990 until 1991, the Los Angeles Dodgers from 1992 until 1993, the Boston Red Sox in 1999 and the Houston Astros in 2000. He played his final MLB game on May 29, 2000.

On May 10, 1994, Gross was purchased from the Los Angeles Dodgers by the Nippon Ham Fighters of the Japanese Pacific League. This explains his absence from Major League Baseball from 1994 until 1998. He was highly successful in Japan, leading the league in wins from 1995 and 1996. Gross returned to the United States in 1998 to undergo surgery. He is remembered by baseball enthusiasts as one of the finest non-Japanese players to have played in the Japanese Leagues and for the Nippon Ham Fighters.

In 2010, Gross was the manager, pitching coach, hitting coach and GM for the Victoria Seals in the Golden Baseball League.
