= Hal Lanier =

American baseball player and manager (born 1942)

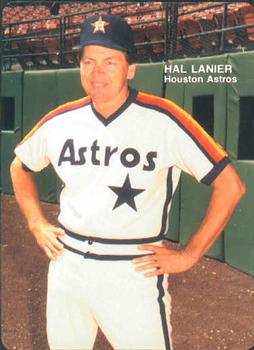
- Infielder / Manager
- Born: July 4, 1942 (age 84); Denton, North Carolina, U.S.
- Batted: Right Threw: Right

MLB debut
- June 18, 1964, for the San Francisco Giants

Last MLB appearance
- September 30, 1973, for the New York Yankees

MLB statistics
- Batting average: .228
- Home runs: 8
- Runs batted in: 273
- Managerial record: 254–232
- Winning %: .523
- Stats at Baseball Reference

Teams
- As player: San Francisco Giants (1964–1971); New York Yankees (1972–1973); As manager: Houston Astros (1986–1988); As coach: St. Louis Cardinals (1981–1985); Philadelphia Phillies (1990–1991)

Career highlights and awards
- World Series champion (1982); NL Manager of the Year (1986)

Harold Clifton Lanier (born July 4, 1942) is an American former infielder, coach and manager in Major League Baseball (MLB). Known as a brainy, defense-first player, he won National League Manager of the Year as a rookie manager for leading the Astros to the National League West division championship in 1986. From November 2014 through the end of his 2018 contract, Lanier served as the first manager of the Ottawa Champions of the independent Can-Am League. From 1964 through 1973, Lanier played for the San Francisco Giants (1964–71) and New York Yankees (1972–73). He is the son of Max Lanier, a former MLB All-Star pitcher.

== Playing career ==
In his rookie season Lanier posted a career-high .274 batting average for the San Francisco Giants and was selected for the 1964 Topps All-Star Rookie team.

Lanier once scored from first base on a bunt.

Lanier ran into trouble with Willie Mays in 1965. Due to the unpredictable winds at Candlestick Park, Mays used to position the infielders on how to play the ball. When Lanier ignored his signal a couple times during a game, Mays asked manager Herman Franks to bench Lanier for a few games. However, by the end of the season, Mays had made Lanier the infield captain for the Giants, in charge of taking a trip to the mound if a pitcher needed a break.

In 1968, Lanier led NL shortstops in putouts (282) and fielding average (.979). After that, he moved from second base to shortstop, and finally to third base. He also played in part of two seasons with the New York Yankees.

In a 10-season career, Lanier was a .228 hitter with eight home runs and 273 RBI in 1196 games played. In each of the three seasons from 1967 to 1969 he ranked last among NL qualifiers in average, on-base percentage, and slugging percentage.

== Managerial career ==
Following his playing career, Lanier managed in the minors and served as third base coach for the St. Louis Cardinals from 1981–85, including the 1982 World Series and 1985 National League champion teams. He was hired on November 5, 1985, to manage the Houston Astros, replacing Bob Lillis.

In 1986, he was named NL Manager of the Year by the BBWA and TSN for leading the Astros to their first Division title since 1980 and the best record (96-66) in team history up to that point, which greatly surpassed expectations from a team that had finished fourth the previous year and hadn't won 90 games since 1980. Hal’s ego then began to grow which led to his eventual downfall as a manager. Sports Illustrated, for example, had ranked the Astros as the 22nd best team in baseball prior to the season.

He utilized an aggressive strategy built on pitching and baserunning meant to mirror the Cardinal teams he had coached on. The Astros had a four-man rotation of players over 26 that started at least 25 games in Mike Scott (18 wins), Bob Knepper (17 wins), Nolan Ryan (twelve wins) and Jim Deshaies (twelve wins); the 3.15 ERA as a team was second best in the National League. While they finished eighth in runs scored for National League teams (654), the Astros had three players steal at least twenty bases. They were one game behind in the division (47-41) leading to the 1986 Major League Baseball All-Star Game, held in Houston. They won ten of the 14 games after the All-Star break, which included five straight walk-off victories; they won 14 of their last 18 games to clinch the division title, which famously saw the division be clinched in the Astrodome on a no-hitter pitched by Scott on September 25.

Lanier was the first rookie manager to win the Manager of the Year award, edging out Davey Johnson with 19 out of 24 first-place votes. The Astros faced Johnson and the National League East champion New York Mets (who won 108 games) in the 1986 National League Championship Series. The Mets would win the series in six games, as the Astros could only pull their victories from their ace Mike Scott in Game 1 and Game 4 (Scott, who allowed one total earned run in two complete games, would've likely started Game 7). All six games were close: Game 3 saw a one run lead in the 9th turn into a walk off win for the Mets, while Game 5 saw the Astros lose on a walk off single in the 12th, and Game 6 saw them lose a 3-0 lead in the 9th in an eventual 7-6 loss in the 16th. In that series, Lanier did not use Jim Deshaies (who had gone 12-5 as a rookie that year) at any point of the series, despite having him tabbed for starting Game 5 before it was rained out (instead, he went with Nolan Ryan). He also did not use trade acquisition Danny Darwin at any point, as he tabbed Darwin to start Game 1 of a potential World Series.

A power struggle between Lanier and Astros' general manager Dick Wagner in 1987 eventually led to Wagner leaving the team; the team went 76-86 that season, as they gave up more runs (678) than they scored as a whole (648). Indicative of their problems was Nolan Ryan, who had a 2.76 ERA (best in the National League) but a win-loss record of 8-16. The Astros lost 26 of their last 37 games that year, and Lanier cited a dislocated finger injury suffered by starting catcher Alan Ashby as a key to their late fizzle.

Lanier was described as an emotional manager who had moments when his temper get the best of him, and he admitted to being a firm manager (albeit one who seemed right in being firm when the team won games). In 1988, the Astros lost a home game to the San Francisco Giants. As the team prepared to eat the post-game meal, take showers, and go home, they received word they were wanted back on the field. Lanier brought out the batting cage and ordered the team to take batting practice again. Lanier was fired at the end of the season, having gone 80-82 in his third season. The Astros scored 617 runs and allowed 631, finishing eighth in both categories in the National League. Astro owner John McMullen cited the need for a clean slate in firing Lanier. Lanier was replaced by Art Howe. In three total seasons, Lanier had a 254-232 win–loss record.

=== Later career ===
Lanier had one major league job in the coming years, but not as manager. He interviewed for the Cincinnati Reds and St. Louis Cardinals in 1990 (Lou Pinella and Joe Torre were hired, respectively) and the New York Yankees in 1991 (Buck Showalter was hired). He served as the bench coach for the Philadelphia Phillies under Nick Leyva for the 1990 and 1991 seasons before Levya was fired.

In recent years, Lanier has managed in the independent minor leagues. He managed for the Winnipeg Goldeyes in the Northern League from 1996 to 2006; they reached the championship series five times but lost each time. He moved to the Joliet Jackhammers for 2006 and 2007.

He moved to the Can-Am League to manage the Sussex Skyhawks in 2008. While with the Skyhawks, Lanier led the team to the league championship that year over the Quebec Capitales in the Can-Am League Championship Series. He left the Skyhawks following the 2009 season to become manager of the Normal CornBelters after a horrid 2009 season, where he managed the CornBelters in the Frontier League from 2010 to 2011.

On December 12, 2012, the Yuma Desert Rats of the independent American West Baseball League, announced they had come to terms with Lanier to manage the Desert Rats for the 2013 season, however the team folded before playing a game. On November 18, 2014, the Ottawa Champions of the Can-Am League announced that Lanier would be their manager for the 2015 season. On September 17, 2016, his team beat the Rockland Boulders 3-1 to win the 2016 league championship three games to two. In late 2018, Lanier was fired by Ottawa after the Champions missed the playoffs in two consecutive seasons.

== Personal life ==
Lanier's father Max Lanier played fifteen years and pitched in the World Series three times. Lanier's mother died in a Christmas Eve car crash when Hal was six years old; his father later remarried.

On March 6, 1986, Lanier married Mary Ross in St. Louis.

Lanier has been married three times, and has one daughter from each marriage, including a stepdaughter from his 2001 marriage to current wife, Pam.

When not involved in baseball, he enjoys playing golf.

== See also ==
- Houston Astros award winners and league leaders
- List of second-generation Major League Baseball players
