= Surprise Fightin' Falcons =

Baseball team

Logo
Cap insignia

Information
- League: Golden Baseball League (2005) (Arizona Division)
- Location: Surprise, Arizona
- Ballpark: Surprise Stadium
- Founded: 2005
- Disbanded: 2005
- League championships: 0
- Division championships: 0
- Former name: Surprise Fightin' Falcons (2005)
- Colors: Blue, red, gray, white
- Ownership: Golden Baseball League
- Manager: Ozzie Virgil, Jr.
- Media: none
- Website: www.goldenbaseball.com/surprise

The Surprise Fightin' Falcons are a defunct professional baseball team based in Surprise, Arizona. They played in the Arizona Division of the independent Golden Baseball League, which was not affiliated with Major League Baseball. They played their home games at Surprise Stadium.

== History ==
The Fightin' Falcons started as one of eight charter teams in the GBL along with the Chico Outlaws, Fullerton Flyers, Long Beach Armada and San Diego Surf Dawgs in California, the Mesa Miners and Yuma Scorpions in Arizona and a traveling team, the Japan Samurai Bears that began play in May 2005. The league owns the naming rights to the team as well as the other seven original teams. In their only season, they finished 3rd in the Arizona Division with a 46-44 record. The team included the league's first ever MVP, Desi Wilson, who during the year had a league record 30-game hitting streak. Outfielder Billy Brown hit a team high 14 home runs and won a gold glove. The team was managed by Ozzie Virgil, Jr. and their mascot was Luke the Falcon.

The team, which played for one season, was based in the Arizona Division. In November 2005, the league contracted both the Falcons and the Mesa Miners.

== Team Record ==
Season	W	L	Win %	Place	Playoff
2005	46	44	.511	3rd, Arizona Division	No Playoff Berth

== See also ==
- Sonora Pilots
