= Fullerton Flyers =

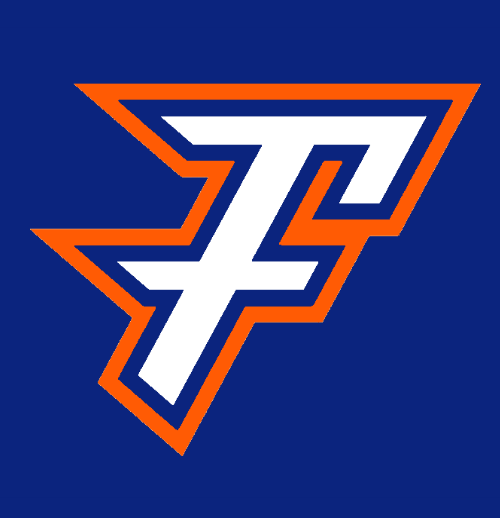
- Cap insignia

Information
- Location: Fullerton, California
- Ballpark: Goodwin Field
- Founded: 2005
- Disbanded: 2012
- League championships: 1 (2008)
- Division championships: 2 (2006-2nd Half, 2008-South)
- Former name: Orange County Flyers (2007–10); Fullerton Flyers (2005–06)
- Former league: Golden Baseball League
- Colors: Blue, orange, white
- Ownership: Western Sports & Entertainment

The Fullerton Flyers were a professional baseball team based in Fullerton, California, in the United States. They were an independent franchise, not affiliated with either Major League Baseball or Minor League Baseball. The team played from 2005 to 2010 and their home stadium was at "The Station" at Goodwin Field, which is also the home field for the Cal State Fullerton Titans.

The Flyers were an original charter team of the Golden Baseball League. After the collapse of that league, they were scheduled to join the new independent North American League, but sat out the 2011 season as they negotiated plans for a new stadium with the city of Fullerton. Those stadium plans never materialized.

In May 2012, they announced they were joining the American West Baseball League (AWBL) and would play in 2013, but they left the league before it was to start.

The team was original owned by the Golden Baseball League and its primary owners Diamond Sports & Entertainment. They were then sold to the Orange County Group, led by investor and actor James Denton, in 2007 and renamed the Orange County Flyers. They were then sold to Western Sports & Entertainment Group on November 23, 2011, and went back to the Fullerton Flyers. Following the folding of the NAL, they were then sold on April 13, 2012, to Godfather Media, which also owned the Yuma Panthers (now the Yuma Desert Rats). However, when Godfather Media owner Michael Cummings resigned as C.E.O. of the league, the team's franchise ownership reverted to the previous owners, Western Sports & Entertainment Group, based out of the Los Angeles area.

== Team history ==
The Flyers were one of the original eight GBL charter teams that started in 2005 along with the Chico Outlaws, Long Beach Armada and San Diego Surf Dawgs in California; Mesa Miners, Surprise Fightin' Falcons and Yuma Scorpions in Arizona and the traveling Japan Samurai Bears (who played in the Arizona Division).

The team officially unveiled its name and logo on January 27, 2005, at Fullerton Train Station. On the same day, they introduced their new general manager, Fullerton native Ed Hart. Hart ran the team for the first three seasons.

The Flyers clinched their first playoff spot ever by winning the second-half division title in 2006. However, they ultimately lost the GBL championship to the Reno Silver Sox, 3 games to 1. First baseman Peanut Williams was named the 2006 GBL Most Valuable Player and hit a league record 20 home runs for the season. RHP Chris Jakubauskas was named the league's Pitcher of the Year for the 2006 season.

=== Team sold and name changed ===
The Flyers were sold on March 21, 2007, to an investment group called the Orange County Group. One of the investors was James Denton, part of the cast of Desperate Housewives. The sale of the Flyers made them the first Golden Baseball League team to ever be sold to a private investment group. On March 28, 2007, they changed their name to the Orange County Flyers, but kept their team colors (blue and orange).

== Managers ==
Since their inception, the Fullerton Flyers/Orange County Flyers have been managed by hometown heroes, All-Stars and Hall of Famers.

=== Garry Templeton (2005-07) ===
Before the team had a logo or even a name, it had Jumpsteady. Three-time National League All-Star Garry Templeton was named manager of the GBL franchise in Fullerton, Calif., on December 6, 2004.

As a player, Templeton was drafted by the St. Louis Cardinals in the 1st round of the 1974 draft. He played sixteen seasons in the major leagues as a switch-hitting shortstop with the Cards, Padres, and Mets, reaching the World Series in 1984. He was a three time major league All Star during his career, garnered a pair of Silver Slugger Awards, led the NL in triples a record three straight years, and was the first player ever to have more than 100 hits from each side of the plate as he led the league with 211 in 1979.

Garry began his managing career in the Anaheim Angels farm system in 1998 as he led the Cedar Rapids Class A team. He stayed as a manager in the Angels systems for the next three years progressing to the Erie AA, Edmonton AAA, and Salt Lake City AAA clubs. Sixteen members of the 2002 Anaheim Angels World Championship team played for Garry in the minors. In 2003 and 2004 Garry led the Gary Railcats of the Northern League as their field manager.

Since leaving the Flyers after the club's first three seasons, Templeton has gone on to manage the Long Beach Armada (2009), Chico Outlaws (2010) and Na Koa Ikaika Maui (2011).

=== Gary Carter (2008) ===
The Flyers made Hall of Fame catcher Gary Carter the second manager in team history on December 5, 2007, during baseball's winter meetings. Carter, who attended Sunny Hills High School in Fullerton, is an 11-time Major League All-Star who won 5 Silver Slugger and 3 Gold Glove awards during his Hall of Fame career.

Carter played a majority of his years with the Montreal Expos and New York Mets. He had one year stints with the San Francisco Giants and Los Angeles Dodgers. Carter was inducted into the Hall of Fame in 2003 along with slugger Eddie Murray, who was his teammate with the Dodgers in 1991.

Carter brought on board coaches Darrell Evans and Dan DiPace who had spent the previous three seasons in Long Beach.

They won the first-ever GBL South Division Championship by defeating Long Beach 3 games to 2 and, for the second time in franchise history, advanced to the GBL Championship Series. The Flyers captured their first GBL Championship by beating the Calgary Vipers 3 games to 2 on September 14, 2008, capping off the best season in team history. On October 14, 2008, GBL Safeway Player of the Year Patrick Breen was picked up by the Los Angeles Angels of Anaheim of Major League Baseball. Carter was named Manager of the Year.

Since leaving the Flyers, Carter managed the Long Island Ducks in 2009, and he was named Head Baseball Coach for the NCAA Division II Palm Beach Atlantic University Sailfish in 2010. Carter died on February 16, 2012, of brain cancer.

=== Phil Nevin (2009) ===
In December 2008, the Flyers named Phil Nevin the third manager in team history. Nevin, who won the Golden Spikes Award in 1992 as the best collegiate baseball player in the nation while with Cal State Fullerton, played 11 seasons in the major leagues for the Houston Astros (1995), Detroit Tigers (1995–97), Anaheim Angels (1998), San Diego Padres (1999-2005), Texas Rangers (2005-2006), Chicago Cubs (2006), and the Minnesota Twins (2006).

Nevin left the Flyers after the 2009 season when he was offered a job to manage the Detroit Tigers Double-A affiliate, the Toledo Mud Hens.

=== Paul Abbott (2010) ===
Paul Abbott became the fourth manager in team history in February 2010. Abbott played 11 seasons in the Major Leagues, beginning his career with the Minnesota Twins in 1990, making his MLB debut on August 21. In addition to his time with the Twins (1990–92), he also played in the Majors with the Indians (1993), Mariners (1998-2002), Royals (2003), Devil Rays (2004), and Phillies (2004). In 162 big league games, Abbott made 112 starts, going 43-37 with a 4.92 ERA.

His best season came in 2001 when Abbott won a career-high 17 games, going 17-4 in 27 starts as the Mariners tied the mark for most victories in a season with 116 wins. Abbott finished his playing career in 2005 as a member of the inaugural Fullerton Flyers team in the first year of the Golden League. The Fullerton native made 9 starts for the Flyers, going 3-5 with a 2.87 ERA.

Abbott's coaching experience included working as a coach for the Fullerton Junior College Hornets in addition to working with the Flyers as Pitching Coach the previous season. Abbott left the Flyers when the Red Sox organization hired him as a pitching coach for the Lowell Spinners in 2011.

== Plans for new stadium ==
The Flyers announced on their website that they were working on plans to move from Goodwin Field (after six years) to Amerige Park, a former Pacific Coast League ballpark in downtown Fullerton, and were waiting for the city's decision. Rumors circulated that if the Flyers were not accommodated by the city, they would have to relocate.

On January 14, 2011, it was announced that the city of Fullerton and the Flyers had entered into an exclusive negotiating period to discuss plans for the Amerige Park location while they sit out the 2011 season.

== North American League ==
On November 23, 2011, team founder/president and chairman Alan Mintz initially announced that the team would return to action in the North American League for 2012 and would do so with their original identity, the Fullerton Flyers. Mintz cited that "This is Fullerton's team". However, on April 13, 2012, the Flyers were sold to Godfather Media, LLC, which also owned the Yuma Panthers and would stay as the Orange County Flyers. The team was expected to play the 2012 season on the road as they could not come to an agreement with Cal State Fullerton to play at Goodwin Field.

The Flyers' new ownership decided to withdraw from the North American League in May 2012 because of uncertainty of the league's future and again sat out the season.

== America West Baseball League ==
After being purchased by Godfather Media, LLC, the Flyers announced they would revert to the Fullerton Flyers and play in Cummings' new league, the American West Baseball League (AWBL). The Flyers along with the Long Beach Splash, North County Cannons (San Diego), Yuma Panthers, and another unannounced team from Mesa, Arizona, were to be the charter teams for the new league, which was to be based in Costa Mesa, California. Along with the new name, the Flyers also announced a new logo featuring blue, black, and white, and keeping a revised train logo.

The league was delayed however and due to discrepancies with the AWBL and Godfather Media, the franchise ownership reverted to its previous owners, Western Sports & Entertainment Group. The future of the team, if any, remains in doubt.

== Team record ==
| Season | W | L | Win % | Place | Manager | Playoff |
|---|---|---|---|---|---|---|
| 2005 | 34 | 56 | .378 | 4th | Garry Templeton | Did not qualify |
| 2006 | 43 | 37 | .538 | 2nd | Garry Templeton | Lost to Reno in the Championship Series, 1-3 |
| 2007 | 37 | 39 | .487 | 4th | Garry Templeton | Did not qualify |
| 2008 | 50 | 36 | .581 | 2nd/1st | Gary Carter | South Division Champions (def. LB, 3-2). Defeated Calgary to win the GBL Championship Series, 3-2. |
| 2009 | 37 | 39 | .490 | 4th | Phil Nevin | Did not qualify |
| 2010 | 51 | 35 | .593 | 2nd | Paul Abbott | Lost to Maui in first playoff round, 3-1 |
