= Ozzie Virgil Jr. =

Puerto Rican baseball player (born 1956)

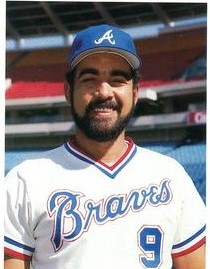
- Catcher
- Born: December 7, 1956 (age 69); Mayagüez, Puerto Rico
- Batted: Right Threw: Right

MLB debut
- October 5, 1980, for the Philadelphia Phillies

Last MLB appearance
- April 24, 1990, for the Toronto Blue Jays

MLB statistics
- Batting average: .243
- Home runs: 98
- Runs batted in: 307
- Stats at Baseball Reference

Teams
- Philadelphia Phillies (1980–1985); Atlanta Braves (1986–1988); Toronto Blue Jays (1989–1990)

Career highlights and awards
- 2× All-Star (1985, 1987)

Osvaldo José Virgil Jr. (born December 7, 1956) is a Puerto Rican former Major League Baseball catcher who played with the Philadelphia Phillies, Atlanta Braves and Toronto Blue Jays from 1980 to 1990. His father, Ozzie Sr., was a Major League catcher and utilityman and longtime coach.

Virgil Jr. threw and batted right-handed and was listed as 6 feet 1 inch (1.85 m) tall and 180 pounds (82 kg). He was selected by the Phillies in the sixth round of the 1976 Major League Baseball draft, and from 1984 to 1988 he was a regular catcher in the National League, being elected to the loop's All-Star team twice, in 1985 and in 1987.

In 1987, Virgil hit a career high 27 home runs with the Braves. In that year's MLB All-Star Game, he was the first player to get a leadoff hit—in the 13th inning of a scoreless game—and scored the game's winning run.

All told, he played in 739 major league games and collected 549 hits, with 98 career home runs.

Years after his playing career was over, Virgil Jr. became a manager, being named manager of the Arizona's Surprise Fightin' Falcons (Arizona) of the independent Golden Baseball League in 2005.

Ozzie Jr. attended Moon Valley High School in Phoenix, Arizona. He set many state records and even forced a taller fence to be erected on the Moon Valley field due to his tendency to use nearby houses as target practice.

In 1978, Virgil was named the Carolina League MVP.

== See also ==
- List of second-generation Major League Baseball players
