= American West Baseball League =

Former proposed independent baseball league

The American West Baseball League was a proposed independent baseball league formed in 2012 and was to start playing in 2013. Sean Smock, a former general manager in minor league baseball, was to be the commissioner of the league.

Numerous teams joined or were set to join within the first few months of the league's creation. The Yuma Desert Rats, who were to be managed by Hal Lanier but withdrew from the league in January 2013, were one. Others included the Orange County Flyers, Long Beach Splash, Fullerton Flyers (to be managed by Evert Renteria), North County Cannons and a squad from Mesa, Arizona, which was to be co-owned by former major league baseball pitcher Albie Lopez. After the Desert Rats withdrew, the league had only Fullerton, San Diego, Orange County and North County among its ranks. Later in January, the circuit added a team in Las Cruces, New Mexico, which was to be managed by Kelly Stinnett and called the Las Cruces Sun Rays. In late February, Nogales, Arizona joined with a team, to be called the Nogales Desert Ghosts and managed by Jolbert Cabrera. In March, North County dropped out of the league. The Bisbee Copperheads (to be managed by Danny DiPace) joined in May, but later that month it stated it would postpone its start to 2014. The league never resurfaced. One source says there was an attempt to put a team in Douglas, Arizona, as well.

Édgar Rentería and Edinson Renteria were investors.

There was also going to be an AWBL winter league, but it, too, was canceled.
