= Surprise, Arizona =

City in Maricopa County, Arizona

- City
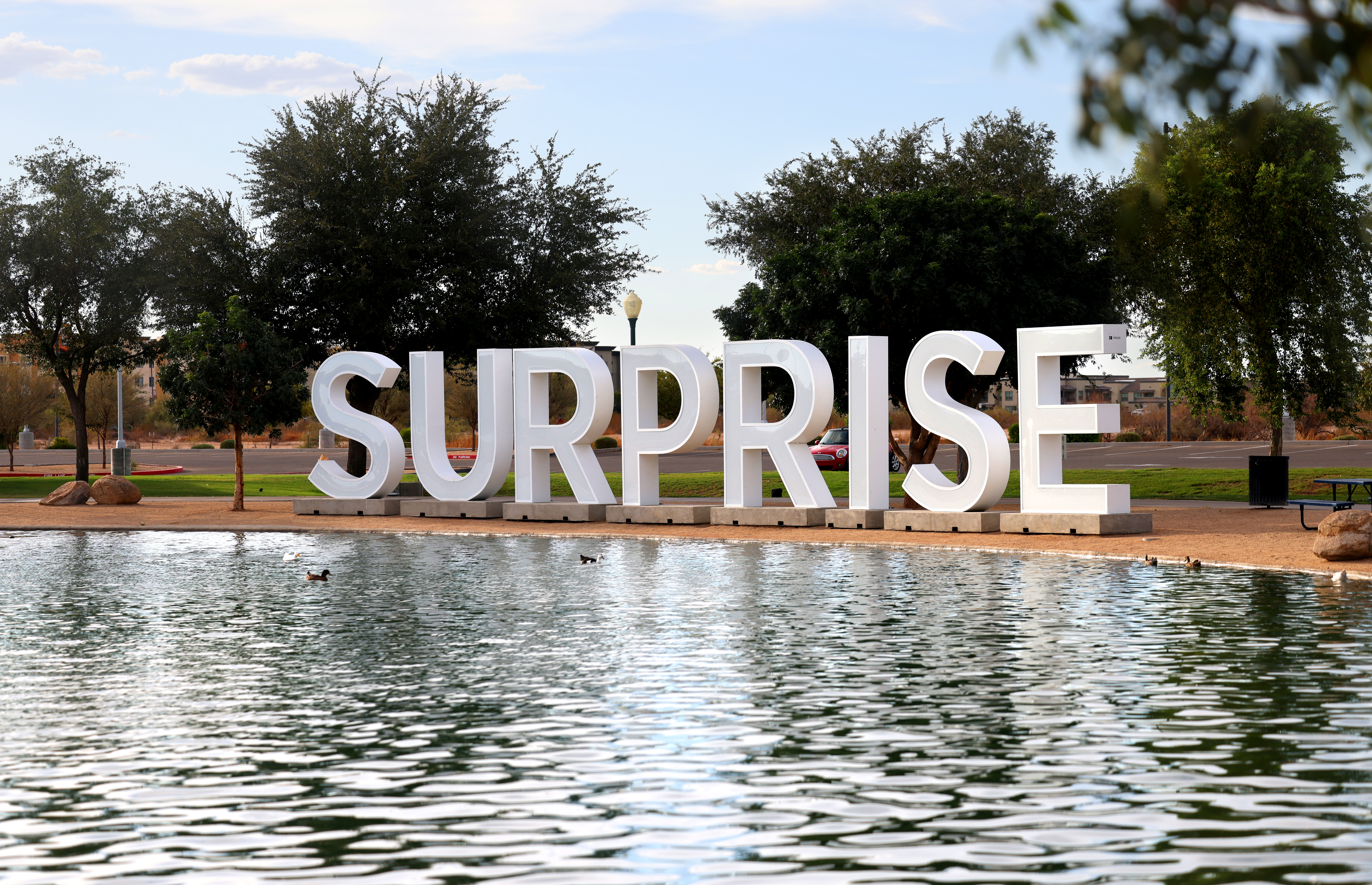
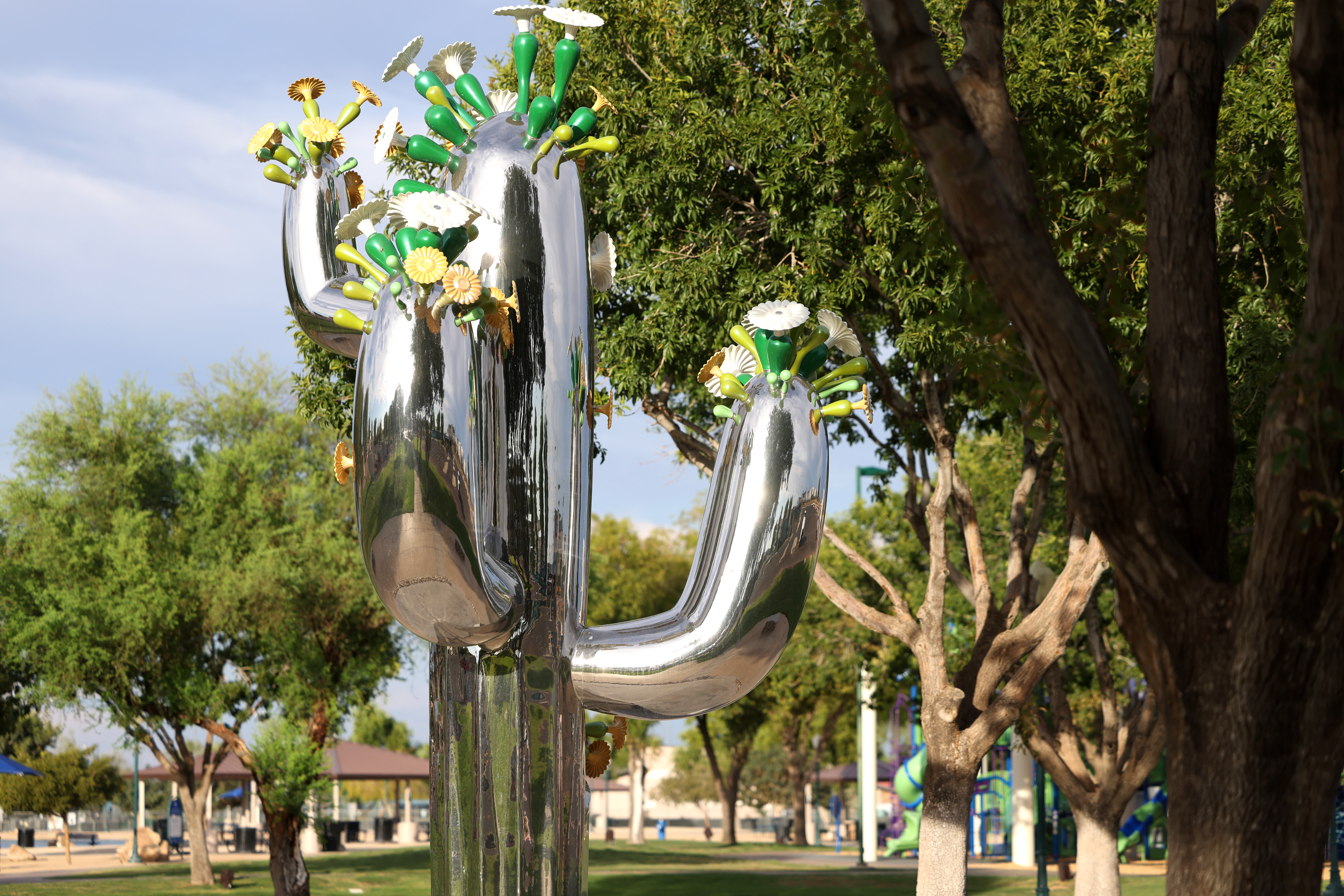
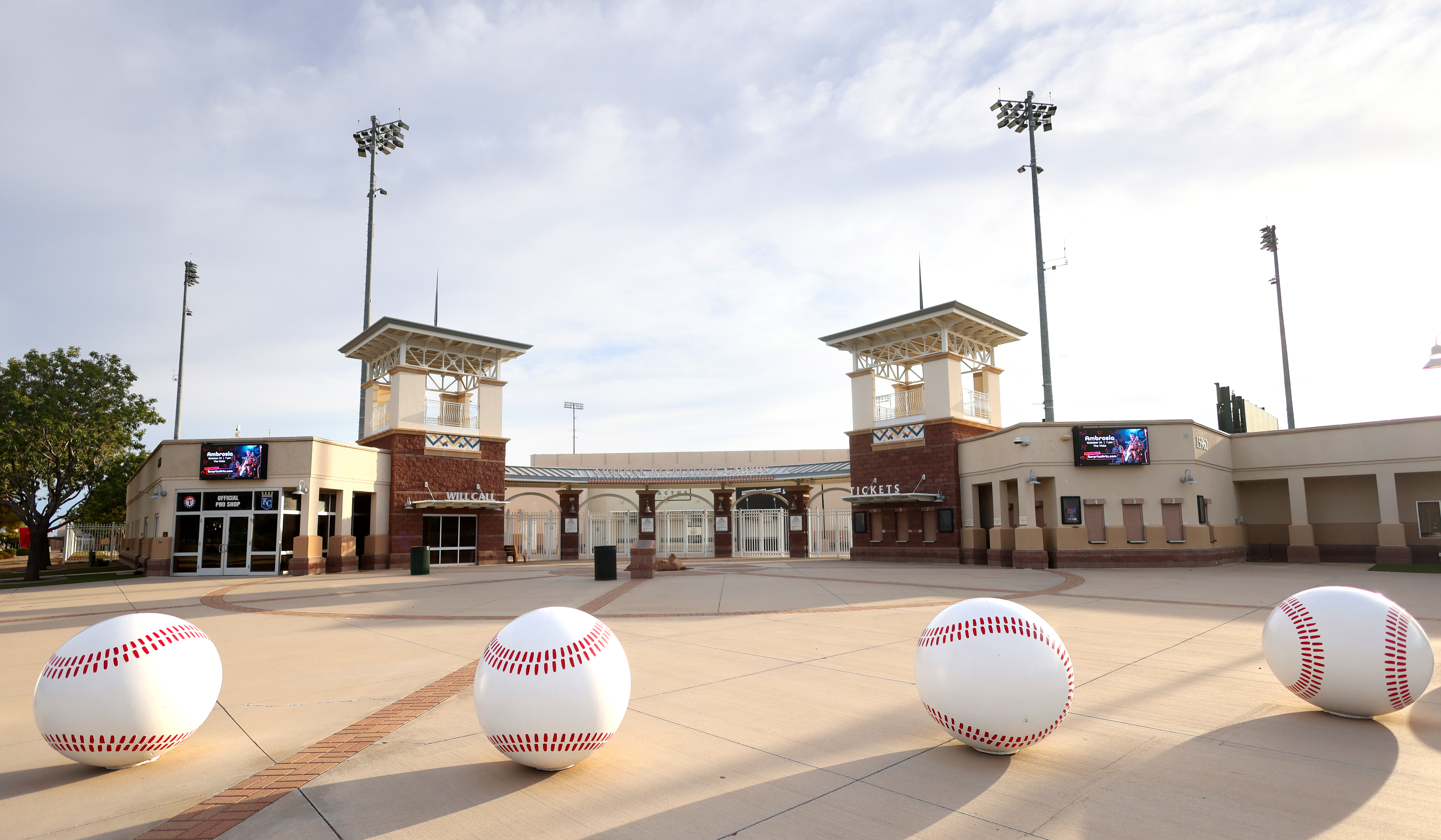
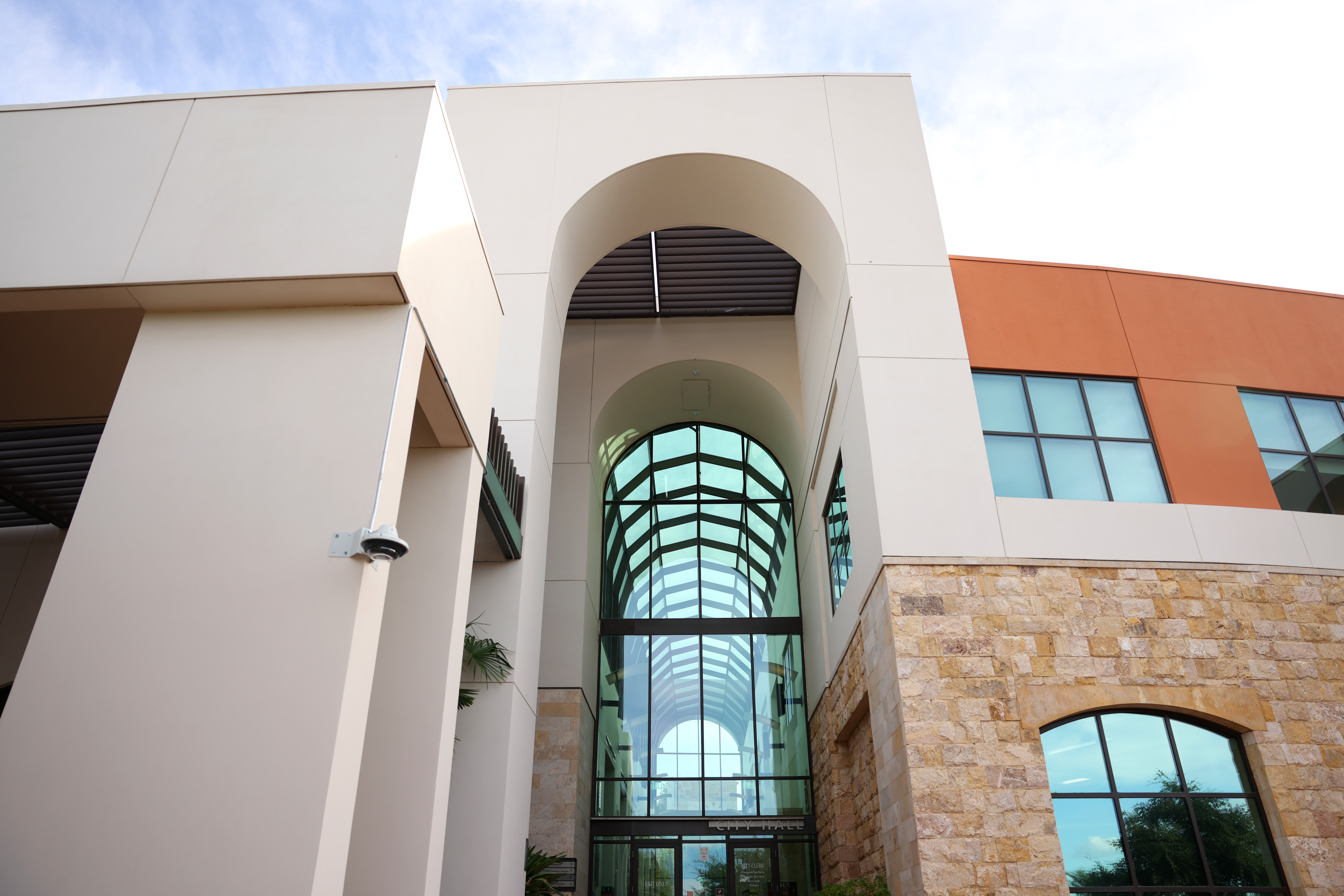
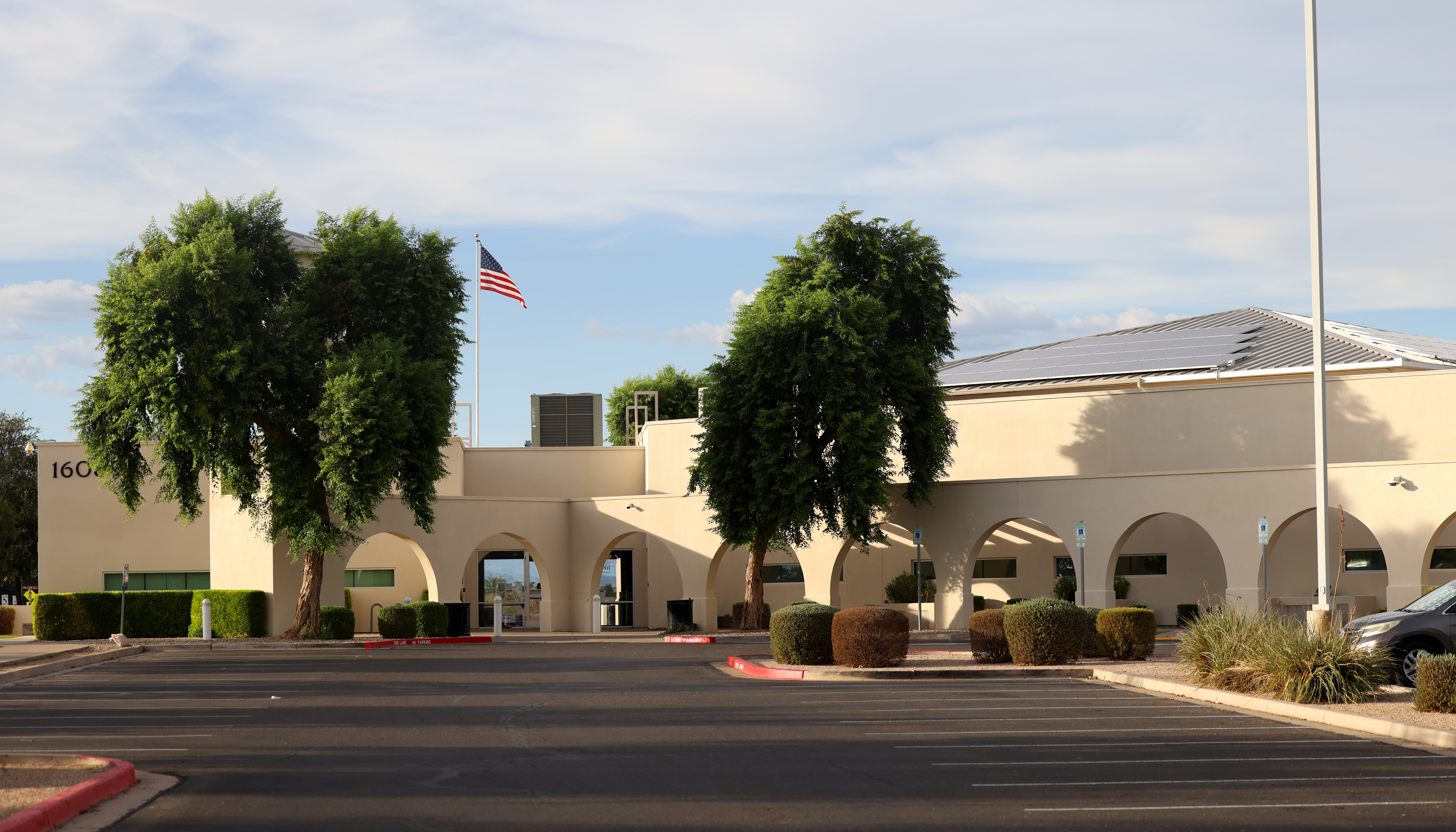
- Surprise Lake "Bloom Where You're Planted" Surprise Recreation Campus Surprise City Hall Surprise Public Library

- Flag Logo

- Location in Maricopa County, Arizona

- Location within Arizona Location within the United States
- Coordinates: 33°37′50″N 112°22′00″W
- Country: United States
- State: Arizona
- County: Maricopa
- Founded: 1938
- Incorporated (town): December 12, 1960

Government
  - Type: Mayor-council government
  - Mayor: Kevin Sartor
  - Vice Mayor: Jack Hastings

Area
  - Total: 110.52 sq mi (286.25 km^{2})
  - Land: 110.30 sq mi (285.68 km^{2})
  - Water: 0.22 sq mi (0.57 km^{2})
- Elevation: 1,385 ft (422 m)

Population (2020)
  - Total: 143,148
  - Rank: US: 189th
  - Density: 1,297.8/sq mi (501.08/km^{2})
- Time zone: UTC−7 (MST (no DST))
- ZIP codes: 85374, 85378–85379, 85387–85388
- Area code: 623
- FIPS code: 04-71510
- GNIS feature ID: 2412016
- Website: www.surpriseaz.gov

Surprise is a city in Maricopa County, in the U.S. state of Arizona. Its population was 143,148 at the 2020 census, up from 117,517 in 2010 and 30,848 in 2000.

== History ==
The city was founded in 1938 by Flora Mae Statler, who was the daughter of another Arizona pioneer, Charles Gillett, who helped found Glendale, specifically as a temperance community. Gillett owned much land in Glendale, as well as the Verde Valley. Surprise officials previously thought the city was founded by Statler's husband, real estate developer and state legislator Homer C. Ludden, but in 2010, property records were discovered that listed Statler as owning the land before she met Ludden. Modern records often state that Statler named her land Surprise as she "would be surprised if the town ever amounted to much," with her daughter backing this claim. This claim is contested, however, since pioneers commonly named their settlements after their hometowns and Ludden hailed from Surprise, Nebraska, possibly influencing the name of the town.

When Surprise was subdivided to build inexpensive houses for agricultural workers, only a few houses and a gas station were on the 1-square-mile (2.6 km^{2}) parcel of land. Since then, the town has experienced tremendous growth. It incorporated as a city in 1960. The original townsite is bounded by Greenway Road on the south, El Mirage Road on the east, Bell Road on the north, and Dysart Road on the west.

Surprise's City Hall is located on the site of Luke Air Force Base's former auxiliary airfield No. 3. The outline of the former runways can still be seen from aerial photos today.

In 2026, the US federal government planned to open a United States Immigration and Customs Enforcement facility in Surprise. This plan received widespread backlash, and residents of the city sought to stop its implementation. The city council refused to oppose the facility, leading to a petition to dissolve the city of Surprise and place it under direct control of the Maricopa County Board of Supervisors. Arizona attorney general Kris Mayes filed a lawsuit in April 2026 claiming that the federal government failed to undergo an environmental review required by the National Environmental Policy Act before beginning construction on the camp. The camp's implementation was ultimately delayed for environmental reviews.

== Geography ==
According to the United States Census Bureau, the city has a total area of 110.5 square miles (286 km^{2}), of which 0.2 sq mi (0.5 km^{2}), or 0.20%, is covered by water water.

== Demographics ==
Historical population
Census	Pop.	Note	%±
1970	2,427		—
1980	3,723		53.4%
1990	7,122		91.3%
2000	30,848		333.1%
2010	117,517		281.0%
2020	143,148		21.8%
2024 (est.)	167,564	▲	17.1%
U.S. Decennial Census

Surprise, Arizona – racial and ethnic composition Note: the US Census treats Hispanic/Latino as an ethnic category. This table excludes Latinos from the racial categories and assigns them to a separate category. Hispanics/Latinos may be of any race.
Race / ethnicity (NH = Non-Hispanic)	Pop 2000	Pop 2010	Pop 2020	% 2000	% 2010	% 2020
White alone (NH)	22,136	83,677	94,856	71.76%	71.20%	66.26%
Black or African American alone (NH)	744	5,648	7,404	2.41%	4.81%	5.17%
Native American or Alaska Native alone (NH)	95	543	786	0.31%	0.46%	0.55%
Asian alone (NH)	321	2,884	3,771	1.04%	2.45%	2.63%
Pacific Islander alone (NH)	15	211	310	0.05%	0.18%	0.22%
Some other race alone (NH)	18	156	591	0.06%	0.13%	0.41%
Multiracial (NH)	335	2,674	7,057	1.09%	2.28%	4.93%
Hispanics or Latinos (any race)	7,184	21,724	28,373	23.29%	18.49%	19.82%
Total	30,848	117,517	143,148	100.00%	100.00%	100.00%

== Economy ==
=== Southwest Railplex ===
A large business park, a foreign trade zone at the southeast corner of the city, is known as the Southwest Railplex industrial district. This area has rail access to the BNSF Railway via the Phoenix Subdivision. The United States Department of Homeland Security purchased a warehouse in this park intending to use it as an Immigration and Customs Enforcement detention facility. A Canadian company, GardaWorld, has been awarded a US$313 million contract to convert the warehouse.

=== Largest employers ===
According to the state of Arizona's 2023 Council of Governments employer database, the top employers in the city are:

#	Employer	# of employees
1	Dysart Unified School District	1,760
2	City of Surprise	1,170
3	Wal-Mart	890
4	Sun Health Foundation	570
5	Fry's Food and Drug	550
6	Costco	370
7	The Home Depot	300
8	McDonald's	270
9	Safeway	240
10	Maricopa County	230

== Arts and culture ==
Surprise Regional Library, a $5.5-million, 20,000-square-foot (1,900 m^{2}) library, is located in Surprise’s Recreation Campus. Surprise has two other city library branches, one in the original townsite (Hollyhock Branch) and one in north Surprise (Asante Branch). On July 1, 2023, the City of Surprise created the Surprise Public Library systems, taking ownership of the three Maricopa County libraries within its borders.

Surprise has a variety of public art installations across the city. Many public installations have been in collaboration with WHAM community art center, which is also in Surprise. The city has several holiday events throughout the year, such as their Easter Eggstavaganza and Sparkling Surprise Christmas event, which are both hosted at the city's recreation campus. They also host several smaller community-engagement events throughout the year such as Sundays in the Park and Lunchtime Theater.

== Parks and recreation ==
The city has a 10,562-square-foot (981.2 m^{2}) Aquatics Center, as well as the smaller Hollyhock Community Pool. Surprise’s Oasis Swim center opened on May 24, 2025. It includes six waterslides, an Olympic-sized pool, and a diving pool. The city of Surprise has 17 city-owned parks across the city, most notably Surprise Community Park on the recreation campus at city center. The 25-acre (10 ha) park hosts a playground, pickleball courts, basketball courts, a fishing lake, and dog parks. As part of the city's Recreation Campus, Surprise is also home to the Surprise Tennis and Racquet Complex.

== Government ==
Surprise is governed on the local level by a mayor and a six-member city council. The mayor is elected at-large, while the council members are elected from the six districts they represent. All city council elections are officially nonpartisan. All representatives serve staggered, four-year terms as of 1981.

== Education ==
The Dysart Unified School District serves the majority of the city, with Nadaburg Unified School District serving a small section of northern Surprise. Ottawa University, a private, nonprofit, Christian, four-year university, opened in Surprise in 2017. It enrolled over 1000 students in 2022.

== Infrastructure ==
=== Roads ===
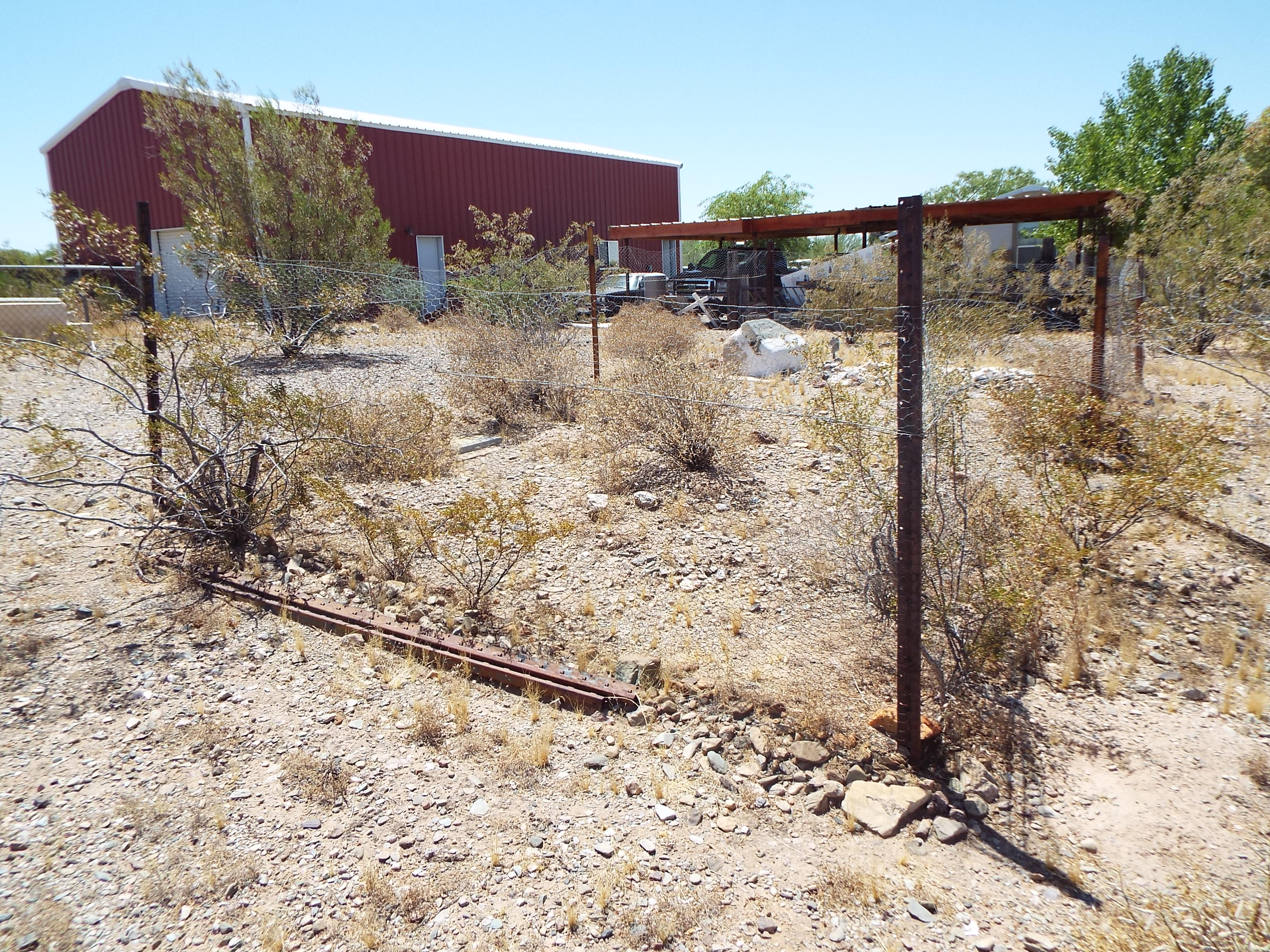
Mission Home Cemetery

Surprise is served by Loop 303 and U.S. Route 60.

=== Transportation ===
Surprise is a member of Valley Metro. Valley Metro Bus operates route 571, an express bus between Surprise and Glendale. Surprise is also a member of WeRIDE, which operates demand-responsive transport in Peoria, Goodyear, Avondale, and Surprise, but was to end this service on July 1, 2025, citing that only 1% of residents used this service.

=== Police ===
The Surprise Police Department consists of a Patrol Operations Division, Agency Support Division, Criminal Investigations Division, and Tactical Support Division.

=== Sun City Grand ===
Sun City Grand (the Grand) is a 45+ active adult retirement community in the city of Surprise founded in 1996. The community's final homes were completed in 2005. Unlike other Del Webb communities in Arizona (Sun City and Sun City West), the Grand is not an unincorporated community led by community associations. The community boasts four golf courses and a variety of other amenities such as pools and recreation centers.

=== Mission Home Cemetery ===
The Mission Home Cemetery, also known as the Sleeping Bride Cemetery, is a historic cemetery located in Surprise.
