= List of professional sports teams in Utah =

Professional sports teams based in Utah encompass multiple teams including the National Basketball Association's Utah Jazz, the National Hockey League’s Utah Mammoth, and Major League Soccer's Real Salt Lake.

== Current teams ==
Major professional teams (current)
| Club | Year introduced | Sport | League | Tier |
|---|---|---|---|---|
| Utah Jazz | 1979 | Basketball | National Basketball Association | Top |
| Utah Mammoth | 2024 | Ice hockey | National Hockey League | Top |
| Real Salt Lake | 2004 | Soccer | Major League Soccer | Top |
| Utah Archers | 2023 | Field Lacrosse | Premier Lacrosse League | Top |
| Utah Royals FC (Note: The original Royals folded after the 2020 season. The team was reestablished in 2023, inheriting the history and records of the former franchise, and resumed play in 2024.) | 2017 | Soccer | National Women's Soccer League | Top |
| Utah Talons | 2025 | Softball | Athletes Unlimited Softball League | Top |
| LOVB Salt Lake | 2025 | Volleyball | LOVB Pro | Top |

Minor professional teams (current)
| Club | Year introduced | Sport | League | Tier |
|---|---|---|---|---|
| Wasatch WarGulls | 2019 | Australian rules football | USAFL | Top |
| Salt Lake Shred | 2022 | Ultimate Frisbee | AUDL | Top |
| Salt Lake Bees | 2006 | Baseball | Pacific Coast League | Class AAA |
| Salt Lake City Stars | 2016 | Basketball | NBA G League | Developmental |
| Utah Great 8's | 2026 | Arena Football | International Arena League of Football | International |
| Real Monarchs | 2015 | Soccer | MLS Next Pro | Division III |
| Ogden Raptors | 1994 | Baseball | Pioneer League | MLB Partner League |
| Utah Falconz | 2014 | American football | Women's National Football Conference | Top |
| Salt Lake Wildcats | 2025 | American football | Women's Football Alliance | Division 2 |

== Historical teams ==
=== American Football ===
| Club | Years active | League |
|---|---|---|
| Utah Pioneers | 1992 | Professional Spring Football League |
| Utah Blitz | 2010–2019 | Women's Football Alliance |
| Utah Argonauts | 2012–2013 | Professional Developmental Football League |
| Salt Lake Stallions | 2018–2019 | Alliance of American Football |

=== Baseball ===
| Club | Years active | League |
|---|---|---|
| Ogden Lobsters | 1900–1902 | Utah-Idaho Intermountain League / Inter-Mountain League / Utah State League |
| Lagoon | 1901–1902 | Inter-Mountain League / Utah State League |
| Park City | 1901 | Inter-Mountain League |
| Salt Lake City | 1901 | Inter-Mountain League |
| Logan Collegians | 1902, 1921, 1926–1927 | Utah–Idaho League |
| Salt Lake City Elders | 1903 | Pacific National League |
| Salt Lake City Mormons | 1909 | Inter-Mountain League |
| Salt Lake City Skyscrapers | 1911–1914 | Union Association |
| Ogden Canners | 1912–1914 | Union Association |
| Murray Infants | 1914 | Union Association |
| Salt Lake City Bees (Three previous franchises) | 1915–28, 1939–42, 1946–65, 1969–70 | Utah–Idaho League / Pacific Coast League / Pioneer League |
| Ogden Gunners | 1926–1928 | Utah–Idaho League |
| Ogden Reds | 1939–42, 1946–55 | Pioneer League |
| Ogden Dodgers | 1966–1973 | Pioneer League |
| Salt Lake City Giants | 1967–1968 | Pioneer League |
| Salt Lake City Angels | 1971–1974 | Pacific Coast League |
| Ogden Spikers | 1974 | Pioneer League |
| Salt Lake City Gulls | 1975–1984 | Pacific Coast League |
| Ogden A's | 1979–1980 | Pacific Coast League |
| Salt Lake City Trappers | 1985–1992 | Pioneer League |
| Salt Lake Stingers (FKA Salt Lake Buzz) | 1994–2005 | Pacific Coast League |
| St. George Pioneerzz (FKA Zion Pioneerzz) | 1999–2001 | Western Baseball League |
| Provo Angels | 2001–2004 | Pioneer League |
| Orem Owlz | 2005–2020 | Pioneer League |
| St. George RoadRunners | 2007–2010 | Golden Baseball League |

=== Men’s Basketball ===
| Club | Years active | League |
|---|---|---|
| Utah Stars | 1970–1975 | American Basketball Association |
| Utah Rockies | 1976 (Note: The Utah Rockies was the name by which the Spirits of St. Louis were set to play in the 1976 season, however the team was dissolved prior to play due to the ABA-NBA merger.) | American Basketball Association |
| Salt Lake City Prospectors | 1978–1979 | Western Basketball Association |
| Utah Snowbears | 2004–2005 | American Basketball Association (2000–present) |
| Salt Lake Dream | 2006 | American Basketball Association (2000–present) |
| Utah Eagles | 2006–2007 | Continental Basketball Association |
| Utah Flash | 2007–2011 | NBA Development League |
| Salt Lake City Saints | 2008 | American Basketball Association (2000–present) |

=== Women’s Basketball ===
| Club | Years active | League |
|---|---|---|
| Utah Starzz | 1997–2002 | Women's National Basketball Association |

=== Ice Hockey ===
| Club | Years active | League |
|---|---|---|
| Salt Lake Golden Eagles | 1969–1994 | WHL / CHL / IHL |
| Utah Grizzlies (1995–2005) | 1995–2005 | IHL / AHL |
| Utah Grizzlies | 2005–2026 | ECHL |

=== Indoor American Football ===
| Club | Years active | League |
|---|---|---|
| Utah Catzz | 1998 | Professional Indoor Football League |
| Utah Rattlers | 2001 | National Indoor Football League |
| Utah Warriors | 2003–2004 | National Indoor Football League |
| Utah Blaze | 2006–2013 | American Indoor Football Association / Arena Football League |
| Utah Saints | 2008 | American Indoor Football Association |
| Ogden Knights | 2009–2010 | American Indoor Football Association |
| Salt Lake Screaming Eagles | 2016–2017 | Indoor Football League |

=== Indoor Soccer ===
| Club | Years active | League |
|---|---|---|
| Utah Freezz | 1999–2001 | World Indoor Soccer League |

=== In-line Hockey ===
| Club | Years active | League |
|---|---|---|
| Utah Rollerbees | 1993 | Roller Hockey International |

=== Rugby ===
| Club | Years active | League |
|---|---|---|
| Utah Warriors | 2010–2011 | Rugby Super League |
| Utah Warriors | 2017–2025 | Major League Rugby |

=== Men’s Soccer ===
| Club | Years active | League |
|---|---|---|
| Utah Golden Spikers (FKA Utah Pioneers) | 1976 | American Soccer League |
| Salt Lake Sting | 1990–1991 | American Professional Soccer League |
| Utah Blitzz | 2000–2004 | USL Second Division |
| Utah Salt Ratz | 2003–2004 | National Premier Soccer League |
| Ogden Outlaws | 2006–2012 | USL Premier Development League |

=== Women’s Soccer ===
| Club | Years active | League |
|---|---|---|
| Utah Starzz (FKA Utah Spiders) | 1999–2013 | Women's Premier Soccer League |
| Real Salt Lake Women | 2008–2018 | United Women's Soccer |

=== Ultimate ===
| Club | Years active | League |
|---|---|---|
| Salt Lake Lions | 2014 | American Ultimate Disc League |

=== Volleyball ===
| Club | Years active | League |
|---|---|---|
| Salt Lake City Stingers | 1979 | International Volleyball Association |
| Utah Predators | 1994 | Women's Western Volleyball League |

== The use of the letter "Z" ==
The professional sports team nicknames are often noted for the unusual frequency of the letter Z appearing in team nicknames (such as the Utah Jazz). This phenomenon reached the peak of its popularity during the 1990s; however, several Utah teams continue to make use of the letter Z. At least ten Utah-based professional sports franchises have used team names that include the letter Z, some of which are intentionally spelled incorrectly, using the Z unnecessarily or as a replacement for another letter. Commenting on the proliferation of such team names, New York Times sportswriter Alan Schwarz called Utah "the state where sports fans go to get their Z's." Local television stations KJZZ-TV (which was owned by Larry H. Miller from 1993 until his estate sold the station in 2016) and KPNZ also played off the Jazz's name to end their calls with Z's.

=== Early Utah -zz teams ===
The popularity of the Z in Utah sports was likely inspired in part by the unusual nickname of the Utah Jazz NBA team, which in 1979 relocated from New Orleans —which is noted for jazz music— to Salt Lake City, which is not. Up until the early 1990s, Utah's other professional teams used somewhat conventional nicknames (such as the Stars, Golden Eagles, and Trappers).

With the arrival of the Salt Lake Buzz in 1994, the similarity of the nicknames "Buzz" and "Jazz" was unmistakable (although the name "Buzz" was really a play on the name of owner Joe Buzas, as well as a nod to Utah's "Beehive State" moniker). The following year, the Utah Grizzlies minor league hockey team also entered the market.

=== Utah becomes a -zz market ===
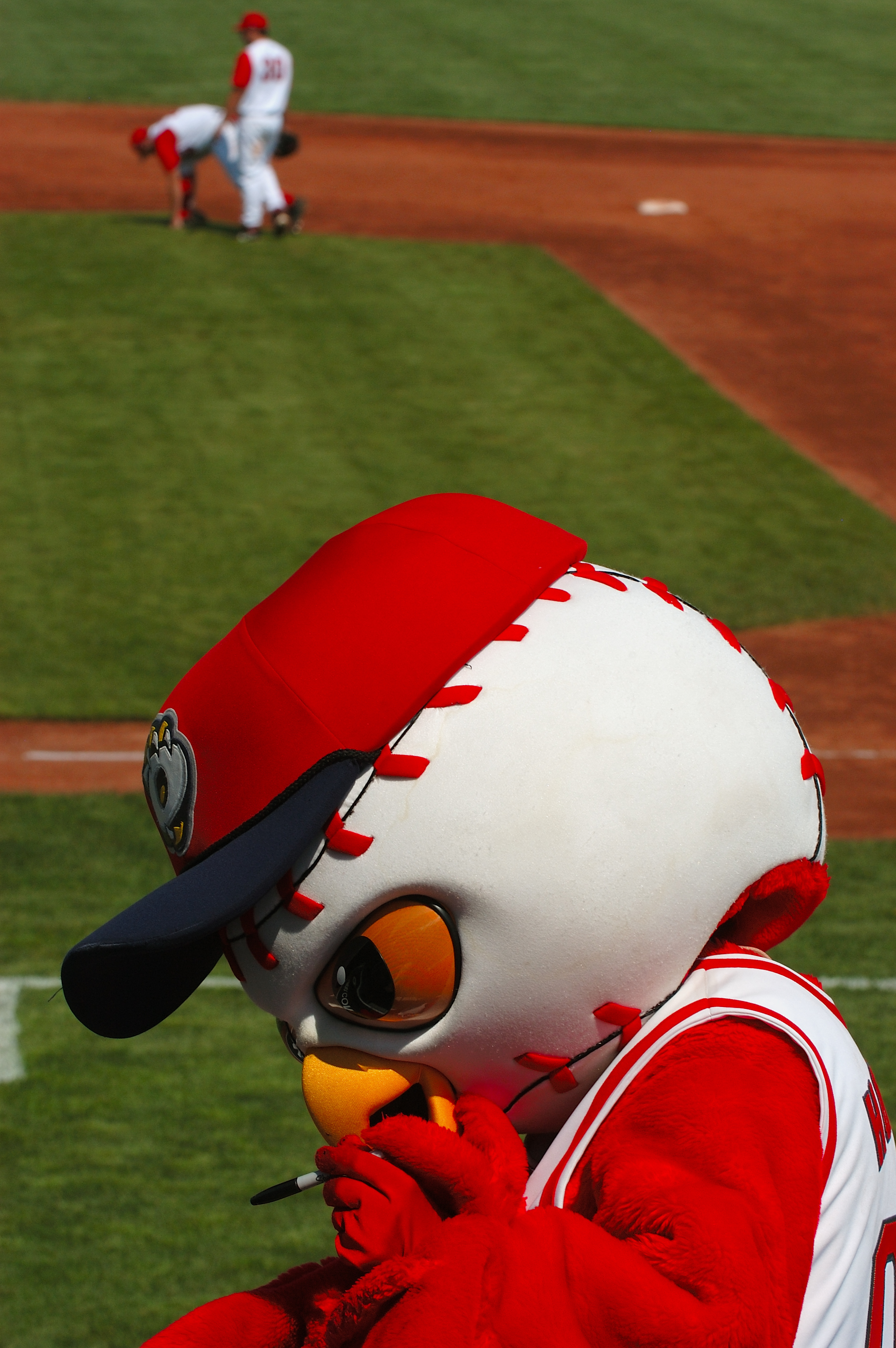
Hootz, the Orem Owlz mascot

The announcement of the Utah Starzz WNBA franchise in 1996 cemented the state's propensity for using the letter Z in its team names. The peculiar "Starzz" nickname was an homage to the Jazz (as well as to the old Utah Stars ABA team). The precedent firmly set, several -zz teams entered the Utah market in subsequent years, to include the Utah Catzz, Utah Freezz, and Utah Blitzz.

From 1994 to 1999, at least seven professional sports teams in the state adopted nicknames containing a double Z (see table below). All of these team names ended in -zz, except the Utah Grizzlies (which are also commonly called "the Grizz"). The Jazz are the only remaining -zz team in Utah today, as all the other teams have relocated, folded, or been renamed.

The Ogden Raptors (1994–present) were the only notable Utah pro franchise to forgo use of the letter Z when entering the Utah market during the 1990s. The Raptors offered this as a selling point, using the slogan "All the fun without the ZZs!" Since 2000, new and renamed franchises have tended to steer away from the Z naming fad, opting instead for names such as Salt Lake Bees, Utah Flash, Real Salt Lake, and Utah Royals FC.

Selected Utah Professional sports teams
-ZZ teams
| Team name | Sport (League) | Nickname still in use | Years used |
|---|---|---|---|
| Utah Jazz | Basketball (NBA) | Yes | 1979–present |
| Salt Lake Buzz | Baseball (PCL) | No – Renamed | 1994–2000 |
| Utah Grizzlies | Hockey (IHL/AHL/ECHL) | No – Relocated | 1995–present (two franchises) |
| Utah Starzz | Basketball (WNBA) | No – Relocated | 1997–2002 |
| Utah Catzz | Indoor football (PIFL) | No – Folded | 1997–1998 |
| Utah Freezz | Indoor soccer (WISL) | No – Folded | 1999–2001 |
| Utah Blitzz | Soccer (USL-2) | No – Folded | 1999–2004 |
| St. George Pioneerzz | Baseball (WBL) | No – Folded | 1999–2001 |
Other Z teams
| Orem Owlz | Baseball (Pioneer League) | Yes, but relocated from Utah | 2005–2020 |
| Utah Blaze | Arena football (AFL I and AFL II) | Yes | 2006–present |
Notable non-Z teams introduced since 1990
| Ogden Raptors | Baseball (Pioneer League) | Yes | 1994–present |
| Utah Rattlers | Indoor football (NIFL) | No – Folded | 2001 |
| Salt Lake Stingers/Bees | Baseball (PCL) | Yes | 2001–present |
| Utah Warriors | Indoor football (NIFL) | No – Folded | 2003–2004 |
| Real Salt Lake | Soccer (MLS) | Yes | 2004–present |
| Utah Snowbears | Basketball (new ABA) | No – Folded | 2004–2005 |
| Utah Eagles | Basketball (CBA) | No – Folded | 2006–2007 |
| St. George RoadRunners | Baseball (GBL) | No – Relocated | 2006–2010 |
| Utah Flash | Basketball (NBA G League) | Yes | 2007–present |
| Utah Saints | Indoor football (AIFA) | No – Folded | 2008–2008 |
| Utah Royals FC | Soccer (NWSL) | Yes | 2017–2020, 2024- |
| Utah Hockey Club/Mammoth | Hockey (NHL) | Yes | 2024- |

Notes:

- The Ogden Raptors previously played as Salt Lake City Trappers from 1985 to 1992.
- The Orem Owlz previously played as Provo Angels from 2001–2004, taking its name from the parent Anaheim Angels franchise. The Owlz' last season playing in Orem was 2019; the team had planned to play in 2020, but the 2020 season of all leagues in Minor League Baseball (MiLB) was not played due to COVID-19. After the contraction of MiLB in 2021, the Owlz were purchased by a Colorado-based group; the team was on hiatus for the 2021 season before resuming in 2022 as the Windsor-based Northern Colorado Owlz.
- The Salt Lake Buzz, Stingers, and Bees are various names for the same Pacific Coast League team.
- After the 2020 NWSL season, Utah Royals FC folded amid a controversy surrounding the principal owner of its parent club, Real Salt Lake, that led to that team's sale. The Royals' player-related assets were assumed by a new ownership group in Kansas City. Following the closure of Real Salt Lake's sale in 2022, the new owners exercised an option to revive the Royals, which resumed play in 2024 as a continuation of the original franchise.
- The Utah Mammoth played as Utah Hockey Club in the 2024–25 NHL season, the team's first in Salt Lake City.

== See also ==
- List of developmental and minor sports leagues
- Professional sports leagues in the United States
- Sports in the United States
