= List of Pioneer League champions =

The Pioneer League is an independent baseball league in the United States. From 1939 to 2020, it was part of affiliated Minor League Baseball. A league champion is determined at the end of each season. Champions have been determined by postseason playoffs or winning the regular season pennant. Currently, the first- and second-half winners within each division, North and South, meet in a best-of-three series to determine division champions. Then, the North and South division winners play a best-of-three series to determine a league champion.

== League champions ==
Series and finalist information is only presented when postseason play occurred; the lack of this information indicates a declared league champion.

Year	Champion	Series	Finalist
1939	Twin Falls Cowboys	—	No playoffs held
1940	Ogden Reds	3–0	Boise Pilots
1941	Ogden Reds	3–1	Boise Pilots
1942	Pocatello Cardinals	4–3	Boise Pilots
1943	Not in operation		
1944	Not in operation		
1945	Not in operation		
1946	Salt Lake City Bees	4–2	Twin Falls Cowboys
1947	Twin Falls Cowboys	4–1	Salt Lake City Bees
1948	Twin Falls Cowboys	4–2	Pocatello Cardinals
1949	Pocatello Cardinals	3–2	Billings Mustangs
1950	Billings Mustangs	3–0	Twin Falls Cowboys
1951	Great Falls Electrics	3–2	Twin Falls Cowboys
1952	Idaho Falls Russets	3–0	Pocatello Bannocks
1953	Salt Lake City Bees	3–0	Great Falls Electrics
1954	Great Falls Electrics	3–2	Salt Lake City Bees
1955	Magic Valley Cowboys	3–2	Pocatello Bannocks
1956	Boise Braves	—	No playoffs held
1957	Billings Mustangs	3–2	Salt Lake City Bees
1958	Boise Braves	3–2	Great Falls Electrics
1959	Billings Mustangs	3–1	Idaho Falls Russets
1960	Boise Braves	3–0	Idaho Falls Russets
1961	Great Falls Electrics	3–1	Boise Braves
1962	Billings Mustangs	3–0	Boise Braves
1963	Idaho Falls Yankees	2–1	Billings Mustangs
1964	Treasure Valley Cubs	—	No playoffs held
1965	Treasure Valley Cubs	—	No playoffs held
1966	Ogden Dodgers	—	No playoffs held
1967	Ogden Dodgers	—	No playoffs held
1968	Ogden Dodgers	—	No playoffs held
1969	Ogden Dodgers	—	No playoffs held
1970	Idaho Falls Angels	—	No playoffs held
1971	Great Falls Giants	—	No playoffs held
1972	Billings Mustangs	—	No playoffs held
1973	Billings Mustangs	—	No playoffs held
1974	Idaho Falls Angels	—	No playoffs held
1975	Great Falls Giants	—	No playoffs held
1976	Great Falls Giants	—	No playoffs held
1977	Lethbridge Dodgers	—	No playoffs held
1978	Billings Mustangs	2–0	Idaho Falls Angels
1979	Lethbridge Dodgers	2–0	Helena Brewers
1980	Lethbridge Dodgers	2–1	Billings Mustangs
1981	Butte Copper Kings	3–2	Calgary Expos
1982	Medicine Hat Blue Jays	3–1	Idaho Falls A's
1983	Billings Mustangs	3–1	Calgary Expos
1984	Helena Gold Sox	3–1	Billings Mustangs
1985	Salt Lake City Trappers	3–2	Great Falls Dodgers
1986	Salt Lake City Trappers	3–1	Great Falls Dodgers
1987	Salt Lake City Trappers	3–1	Helena Brewers
1988	Great Falls Dodgers	3–2	Butte Copper Kings
1989	Great Falls Dodgers	3–0	Butte Copper Kings
1990	Great Falls Dodgers	3–0	Salt Lake City Trappers
1991	Salt Lake City Trappers	2–1	Great Falls Dodgers
1992	Billings Mustangs	2–0	Salt Lake City Trappers
1993	Billings Mustangs	2–1	Helena Brewers
1994	Billings Mustangs	3–2	Helena Brewers
1995	Helena Brewers	2–0	Medicine Hat Blue Jays
1996	Helena Brewers	2–0	Ogden Raptors
1997	Billings Mustangs	2–0	Great Falls Dodgers
1998	Idaho Falls Braves	2–1	Lethbridge Black Diamonds
1999	Missoula Osprey	2–0	Billings Mustangs
2000	Idaho Falls Padres	2–0	Great Falls Dodgers
2001	Billings Mustangs	2–0	Provo Angels
2002	Great Falls Dodgers	2–1	Provo Angels
2003	Billings Mustangs	2–0	Provo Angels
2004	Provo Angels	2–0	Billings Mustangs
2005	Orem Owlz	2–0	Helena Brewers
2006	Missoula Osprey	2–0	Idaho Falls Chukars
2007	Orem Owlz	2–0	Great Falls White Sox
2008	Great Falls Voyagers	2–1	Orem Owlz
2009	Orem Owlz	2–1	Missoula Osprey
2010	Helena Brewers	2–0	Ogden Raptors
2011	Great Falls Voyagers	2–0	Ogden Raptors
2012	Missoula Osprey	2–1	Ogden Raptors
2013	Idaho Falls Chukars	2–1	Helena Brewers
2014	Billings Mustangs	2–0	Orem Owlz
2015	Missoula Osprey	2–1	Idaho Falls Chukars
2016	Orem Owlz	2–0	Billings Mustangs
2017	Ogden Raptors	2–1	Great Falls Voyagers
2018	Great Falls Voyagers	2–0	Grand Junction Rockies
2019	Idaho Falls Chukars	2–1	Ogden Raptors
2020	None (season cancelled due to COVID-19 pandemic)		
2021	Missoula PaddleHeads	2–1	Boise Hawks
2022	Grand Junction Rockies	2–0	Missoula PaddleHeads
2023	Ogden Raptors	2–0	Billings Mustangs
2024	Yolo High Wheelers	3–1	Glacier Range Riders
2025	Oakland Ballers	3–2	Idaho Falls Chukars
2026	Billings Mustangs	2–0	Long Beach Coast

== Championship wins by team ==
Active Pioneer League teams appear in bold.

Wins	Team	Championship years
16	**Billings Mustangs**	1950, 1957, 1959, 1962, 1972, 1973, 1978, 1983, 1992, 1993, 1994, 1997, 2001, 2003, 2014, 2026
12	**Great Falls Electrics/Giants/Dodgers/Voyagers**	1951, 1954, 1961, 1971, 1975, 1976, 1988, 1989, 1990, 2002, 2008, 2011, 2018
8	**Idaho Falls Russets/Yankees/Angels/Braves/Padres/Chukars**	1952, 1963, 1970, 1974, 1998, 2000, 2013, 2019
5	**Missoula Osprey/PaddleHeads**	1999, 2006, 2012, 2015, 2021
4	Helena Gold Sox/Brewers	1984, 1995, 1996, 2010
4	Ogden Dodgers	1966, 1967, 1968, 1969
4	Orem Owlz	2005, 2007, 2009, 2016
4	Salt Lake City Trappers	1985, 1986, 1987, 1991
3	Boise Braves	1956, 1958, 1960
3	Lethbridge Dodgers	1977, 1979, 1980
3	Twin Falls Cowboys	1939, 1947, 1948
2	**Ogden Raptors**	2017, 2023
2	Ogden Reds	1940, 1941
2	Pocatello Cardinals	1942, 1949
2	Salt Lake City Bees	1946, 1953
2	Treasure Valley Cubs	1964, 1965
1	Butte Copper Kings	1981
1	Grand Junction Rockies	2022
1	Magic Valley Cowboys	1955
1	Medicine Hat Blue Jays	1982
1	**Oakland Ballers**	2025
1	Provo Angels	2004
1	**Yuba-Sutter High Wheelers**	2024
