= List of professional sports teams in Montana =

Montana is the 43rd most populated state in the United States and has a rich history of professional sports.

== Active teams ==
Baseball
League	Team	City	Stadium	Capacity
PL (Ind.)	Billings Mustangs	Billings	Dehler Park	3,071
PL (Ind.)	Glacier Range Riders	Kalispell	Glacier Bank Park	2,500
PL (Ind.)	Great Falls Voyagers	Great Falls	Centene Stadium	4,000
PL (Ind.)	Missoula PaddleHeads	Missoula	Ogren Park at Allegiance Field	5,000

=== Map of cities with a professional sports team ===
Location with a professional sports team

== See also ==
- Sports in Montana
