= Ogden, Utah minor league baseball history =

Ogden Gunners
- 1900–1928; (1900–1902, 1905, 1912–1914, 1921, 1926–1928); Ogden, Utah

Minor league affiliations
- Class: Independent (1900–1902, 1905); Class D (1912–1914); Independent (1921); Class C (1926–1928)
- League: Utah-Idaho Intermountain League (1900); Inter-Mountain League (1901); Utah State League (1902); Pacific National League (1905); Union Association (1912–1914); Northern Utah League (1921); Utah–Idaho League (1926–1928)

Major league affiliations
- Team: None

Minor league titles
- League titles (3): 1900; 1901; 1914
- Conference titles (1): 1921

Team data
- Name: Ogden Lobsters (1900–1901); Ogden (1902); Ogden Lobsters (1905); Ogden Canners (1912–1914); Ogden (1921); Ogden Gunners (1926–1928)
- Ballpark: Glenwood Park (1912–1914); Lorin Farr Park (1926–1928)

The Ogden Gunners were a minor league baseball team based in Ogden, Utah, between 1900 and 1928. The Ogden "Gunners" played the 1926 to 1928 seasons as members the Class C level Utah–Idaho League. The Gunners were preceded by Ogden teams in the 1901 Inter-Mountain League, 1902 Utah State League, 1905 Pacific National League, Union Association (1912–1914) and the 1921 Northern Utah League, winning three championships and a league pennant.

Baseball Hall of Fame member Ernie Lombardi played for the 1927 Ogden Gunners.

Ogden next hosted the 1939 Ogden Reds of the Pioneer League. Today, the Ogden Raptors play as members of the Pioneer League.

== History ==
Ogden first had a minor league baseball team with the Ogden Lobsters of the Utah-Idaho Intermountain League in 1900. The Lobsters won the 1900 Utah-Idaho Intermountain League Championship, finishing with a record of 32–13 under manager Dad Gimlin to finish 8.0 games ahead of second place Rio Grande Rios in the four-team Independent league. They finished ahead of the third place Pocatello Indians and fourth place Short Line Shorts in the final league standings.

The Ogden Lobsters joined the Inter-Mountain League in 1901, playing in the newly created four-team league, along with the Park City Miners, Railway Ducks/Lagoon Farmers and Salt Lake City White Wings. Ogden finished with a record of 31–10 to capture the 1901 Inter-Mountain League Championship, playing under returning manager Dad Gimlin to finish 5.0 games ahead of the second place Salt Lake City White Wings. The league folded after the 1901 season.

Ogden continued play as members of the four–team Independent level Utah State League in 1902 under manager Frank "Dad" Gimlin. The league standings for the 1902 season are unknown.

The Ogden Lobsters played in the 1905 Pacific National League, alongside the Boise Infants, Salt Lake City Fruit Pickers and Spokane Indians teams. In the final standings, Ogden placed second in the league with a 20–17 record in a shortened season. The Pacific National League disbanded on June 20, 1905, and did not reform.

The Ogden Canners played in the Class D level Union Association from 1912 to 1914. Ogden placed fourth in 1912 with a 71–68 record. The Canners placed sixth (last) in 1913, with a record of 49–74. The Union Association folded on August 5, 1914, however Ogden and the Salt Lake City Skyscrapers played 16 games against each other to complete their seasons. Ogden won 10 of the 16 games to finish with an overall record of 54–32, ending the season 2.0 games ahead of Salt Lake. In the Finals, Ogden defeated Salt Lake 4 games to 2 and captured the 1914 Union Association Championship.

Ogden fielded a team in the Independent, newly formed, 1921 Northern Utah League. On July 3, 1921, Ogden pitcher Dave Davenport pitched a perfect game against Tremonton in 4–0 Ogden victory. Ogden finished with an 11–5 record in 1921, placing 2nd in the six–team Northern Utah League regular season standings, 1.0 games behind the champion Tremonton team. A "league report" stated Ogden tied with Tremonton for the second half title with 15-5 records, before losing to Tremonton in a three–game playoff series. Tremonton pitcher Franklin Coray reportedly defeated Ogden in the first game, throwing a no–hitter in a 2–0 victory. The Northern Utah League permanently folded after playing only the 1921 season.

In 1921, Ogden pitcher Dave Davenport, a former major league pitcher, was still the property of the St. Louis Browns and under suspension after failing to report to the team in 1920. Davenport began the 1921 season with a 7–0 record pitching for Ogden at age 31, which included a no-hitter. After his successful start, Davenport was then released by Ogden, with pressure from the Northern Utah League owners, for being too good to pitch in the Northern Utah League.

The Ogden Gunners joined the Utah–Idaho League in 1926 and were charter members, along with the Idaho Falls Spuds, Logan Collegians, Pocatello Bannocks, Twin Falls Bruins and Salt Lake City Bees.

After finishing last with a 46–65 record in 1926, the Ogden Gunners finished with a 58–45 record to place second in 1927, playing under manager Del Baker. Baseball Hall of Fame inductee Ernie Lombardi played for the 1927 Ogden Gunners at age 19, hitting .398 on the season.

In 1928, Ogden placed fourth at 57–59, with Del Baker again managing the team, as the Salt Lake City Bees won the championship. The six–team Utah–Idaho League disbanded after the 1928 season.

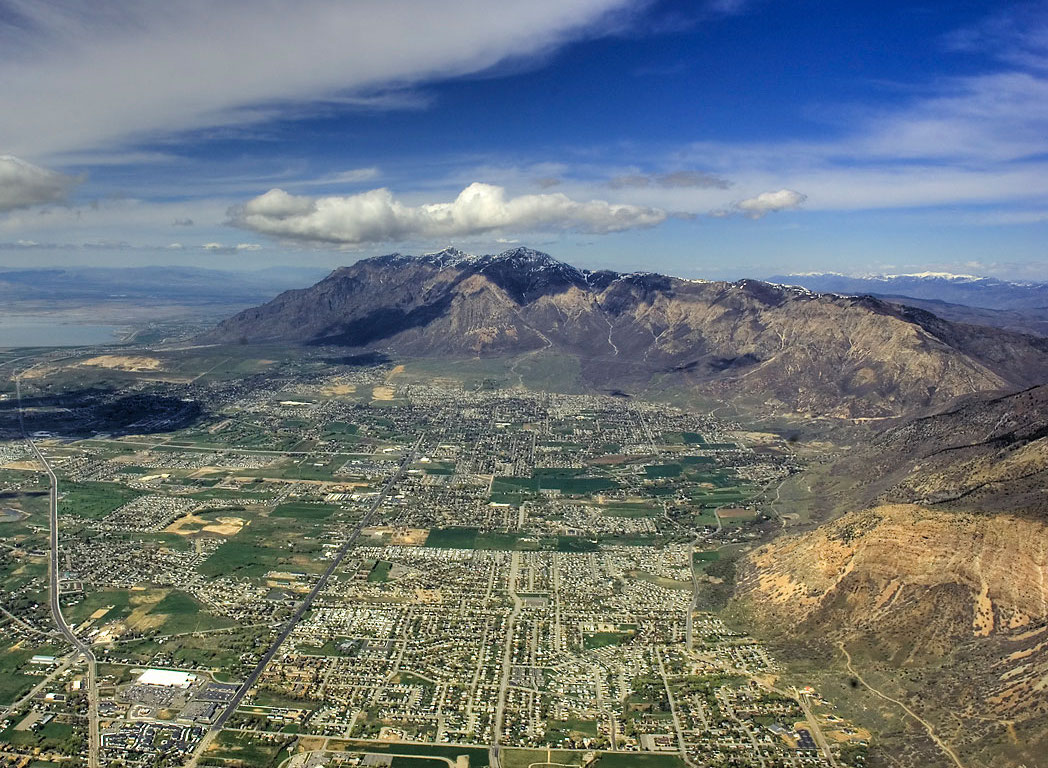
(2008) Ogden, Utah

Ogden remained without a team until the Ogden Reds began play as founding members of the Pioneer League in 1939. The Ogden Reds disbanded in 1955, and a few more minor-league teams came and went from the city, mostly playing in the Pioneer League. As of 2025, Ogden has a team in the Pioneer League: the Ogden Raptors.

== The ballparks ==
From 1912 to 1914, the Ogden Canners hosted minor league home minor league games at Glenwood Park. The ballpark opened in April 1912. It was located on 27th Street, between Washington Avenue and Grant Avenue in Ogden, Utah.

The Ogden Gunners (1926–1928) and later the Ogden Reds (1939) played home games at Lorin Farr Park. With a capacity of 2,600 (1926) and 2,500 (1939), the park had field dimensions (left, center, right) of 325-377-325 (1939). Today, Lorin Farr Park is still in use as a public park with a swimming pool complex. The address is 1691 Gramercy Avenue in Ogden, Utah.

== Notable alumni ==
- Ernie Lombardi (1927) Inducted into the Baseball Hall of Fame in 1986
- Walt Alexander (1912)
- Del Baker (1927–1928, MGR)
- Dad Clark (1902)
- Johnny Couch (1914)
- Dave Davenport (1921)
- Pete Dowling (1905)
- Roy Evans (1901)
- Larry French (1926) MLB All-Star
- Frank Hansford (1902)
- Bob Jones (1913)
- Eddie Kenna (1921)
- Swede Risberg (1913–1914) Black Sox Scandal
- Dwight Stone (1912)
- Gus Thompson (1905)
- Johnny Vergez (1927–1928)
- Jimmy Whelan (1912)
- Ogden Canners players
- Ogden Gunners players
- Ogden (minor league baseball) players
