= Billings Mustangs =

American minor-league professional baseball team

- Founded in 1948; Billings, Montana
Team logo
Cap insignia

Minor league affiliations
- Class: Independent (from 2021)
- Previous classes: Class C (1948–1962); Class A (1963); Rookie Advanced (1969–2020)
- League: Pioneer League (1948–1963, 1969–present)

Major league affiliations
- Team: Independent (1948, 2021–present)
- Previous teams: Cincinnati Reds (1974–2020); Kansas City Royals (1970–1973); Seattle Pilots (1969); St. Louis Cardinals (1957–1963); Pittsburgh Pirates (1952–1956); Brooklyn Dodgers (1949–1951)

Minor league titles
- League titles (16): 1950; 1957; 1959; 1962; 1972; 1973; 1978; 1983; 1992; 1993; 1994; 1997; 2001; 2003; 2014; 2026
- Division titles (12): 1980; 1983; 1984; 1992; 1993; 1994; 1997; 1999; 2001; 2003; 2023; 2026

Team data
- Name: Billings Mustangs (1948–1963, 1969–present)
- Colors
- Mascot: Homer
- Ballpark: Dehler Park (2008–present)
- Previous parks: Cobb Field (1948–1963, 1969–2007)
- Owner/ Operator: Main Street Baseball
- General manager: Matt Allen
- Manager: Craig Maddox
- Website: billingsmustangs.com

The Billings Mustangs are an independent baseball team of the Pioneer League, which is not affiliated with Major League Baseball (MLB) but is an MLB Partner League. They are located in Billings, Montana, and have played their home games at Dehler Park since 2008. The team previously played at Cobb Field.

== History ==
Previous Logo until 2024

The Mustangs joined the Class C Pioneer League in 1948, then a full-season league. The club was founded by Brown Derby founder Bob Cobb, a Billings native who enlisted Hollywood stars such as Bing Crosby, Cecil B. DeMille, Robert Taylor, and Barbara Stanwyck to purchase stock at $500 to $1,000 apiece to help launch the club. Local residents also purchased stock to help fund $100,000 in upgrades to Billings' Athletic Park, which was renamed for Cobb.

In the inaugural 1948 season, the Mustangs were an independent club, though they maintained a loose relationship with Cobb's other club, the Hollywood Stars of the Pacific Coast League. After their inaugural season, the Mustangs had affiliations with the Brooklyn Dodgers (1949–1951), Pittsburgh Pirates (1952–1956), and St. Louis Cardinals (1957–1963), winning Pioneer League championships in 1950, 1957, 1959, and 1962. However, despite this success, the club folded following the 1963 season, ending a sixteen-season run.

After going dark for five seasons, the 1969 Major League Baseball expansion created the need for more minor league affiliates. The Mustangs were reborn in the now short-season Pioneer League as the Rookie-level affiliate of the Seattle Pilots in 1969. That was followed by a four-year stint as an affiliate of the Kansas City Royals (1970–1973), earning Pioneer League titles in 1972 and '73. Future Baseball Hall of Fame inductee George Brett began his professional career with the 1971 Mustangs.

In 1974, the Mustangs signed as an affiliate of the Cincinnati Reds, beginning a relationship with the Reds that stretched for 47 years. As of 2019, the Reds-Mustangs partnership was tied for the fifth-longest affiliation in all of Minor League Baseball.

Billings claimed league championships in 1978 and 1983, with the 1978 team becoming best-known for the record-breaking exploits of Gary Redus, who set a still-standing all-time minor league record by batting .462. The late 80's were leaner, but still featured memorable moments, including snapping the minor league record 29-game winning streak of the Salt Lake City Trappers in 1987 and featuring future Hall of Famer pitcher Trevor Hoffman in 1989, who played shortstop that season before moving to the mound a year later.

The Mustangs won three consecutive Pioneer League championships from 1992 to 1994, then won another in 1997. The 1994 season featured a club-record fifteen-game winning streak and a perfect game by Jason Robbins on August 1, the only perfect game thrown in the Pioneer League since 1951 and one of only three in the league's 85-year history.

After sweeping the Provo Angels in the 2001 championship series, the Mustangs repeated the feat in 2003. In the latter year, Billings, the last team to qualify for the postseason, won game one at Provo 8–5 in 11 innings, then, Billings won 3–0 on a no-hitter by James Paduch to win the championship in front of a sold-out Cobb Field in Billings. The game was a pitchers' duel between two of the top pitchers in the league (Provo's being 2003 Pioneer League Pitcher of the Year Abel Moreno).

In 2006, Chris Valaika set a Pioneer League record with a 32-game hitting streak during the Mustangs 51-win campaign. The Mustangs snapped an 11-year drought in 2014 with their Pioneer League-record 15th league championship.

The Billings Mustangs changed their logo for the 2006 season. The 2007 season was their last at Cobb Field and the Mustangs begin the 2008 season at Dehler Park. On September 11, 2014, the Mustangs defeated the Orem Owlz for their first Pioneer League Championship since the 2003 season. After the 2014 season, the team introduced its new ownership group, Main Street Baseball at a December 5 in a press conference at Dehler Park.

After the cancellation of the 2020 season, Major League Baseball contracted 43 minor league franchises for the 2021 season, including all eight members of the Pioneer League. The Pioneer League converted to an independent baseball league and became an MLB Partner League.

In this new arrangement, the Mustangs enjoyed a playoff appearance under the leadership of former MLB manager Jim Riggleman in 2022, before reaching the Pioneer League championship series in 2023, where they fell to the Ogden Raptors.

In its time as a Rookie or Advanced Rookie team, Billings was the first experience with professional baseball for most players. Many major league stars have begun their pro careers in Billings. These include George Brett, Reggie Sanders, Paul O'Neill, Trevor Hoffman, Keith Lockhart, Danny Tartabull, Ben Broussard, Scott Sullivan, Aaron Boone, Adam Dunn, Austin Kearns, and B. J. Ryan.

== Playoffs ==
- 1949: Defeated Salt Lake City 2–0 in semifinals; lost to Pocatello 3–2 in finals.
- 1950: Defeated Pocatello 2–0 in semifinals; defeated Twin Falls 3–0 to win league championship
- 1952: Lost to Pocatello 2–0 in semifinals
- 1953: Lost to Great Falls 2–0 in semifinals
- 1954: Lost to Great Falls 2–1 in semifinals
- 1957: Defeated Salt Lake City 3–2 to win league championship
- 1959: Defeated Great Falls 2–1 in semifinals; defeated Idaho Falls 3–1 to win league championship
- 1962: Defeated Boise 3–0 to win league championship
- 1963: Defeated Great Falls 2–0 in semifinals; lost to Idaho Falls 2–1 in finals
- 1978: Defeated Idaho Falls 2–0 to win league championship
- 1980: Lost to Lethbridge 2–1 in finals
- 1983: Defeated Calgary 3–1 to win league championship
- 1984: Lost to Helena 3–1 in finals
- 1992: Defeated Salt Lake 2–0 to win league championship
- 1993: Defeated Helena 3–2 to win league championship
- 1994: Defeated Helena 2–1 to win league championship
- 1995: Lost to Medicine Hat 2–1 in semifinals
- 1997: Defeated Idaho Falls 2–0; defeated Great Falls 2–0 to win league championship
- 1999: Defeated Idaho Falls 2–0; lost to Missoula 2–0 in finals
- 2001: Defeated Missoula 2–1 in semifinals; defeated Provo 2–0 to win league championship
- 2002: Lost to Great Falls 2–0 in semifinals
- 2003: Defeated Provo 2–0 to win league championship
- 2004: Defeated Great Falls 2–0 in semifinals, lost to Provo 2–0 in finals
- 2005: Lost to Helena 2–0 in semifinals
- 2006: Lost to Missoula 2–0 in semifinals
- 2008: Lost to Great Falls 2–0 in semifinals
- 2014: Defeated Great Falls 2–0 in semifinals; defeated Orem 2–0 to win league championship
- 2015: Lost to Missoula 2–1 in semifinals
- 2016: Defeated Great Falls 2–1 in semifinals; lost to Orem 2–0 in finals.
- 2018: Lost to Great Falls 2–0 in semifinals.
- 2019: Lost to Idaho Falls 2–1
- 2022: Lost to Missoula 2-1 in semifinals.
- 2023: Defeated Missoula 2-1 in semifinals; lost to Ogden 2-0 in finals.
- 2026: Defeated Missoula 2-0 in semifinals; defeated Long Beach 2-0 in finals.

== Roster ==
Billings Mustangs roster
Active (25-man) roster		Coaching staff
Pitchers: 50 Arturo Alvarez; 21 Tariq Bacon; 18 Greg Blackman; 28 Hudson Boncal; 19 Cole Chimenti; 45 C. J. Colyer; 65 Hollis Fanning; 16 Daniel Foster; 36 Justin Fuson; 53 Julian Garcia; 43 Chris Hardin; 15 E. J. Johnson; 30 Jack Maruskin; 35 Ethan Ross; 52 Ismael Michel Sanchez; 47 Shane Spencer; 26 Thomas Wilhite; 13 Bodee Wright; Utility players: 39 Tyler Shelnut	Catchers: 34 Ronnie Allen Jr.; 40 Sean Lynch; 5 Kyle Micklus; Infielders: 11 Evan Berkey; 23 Cameron Bowen; 24 Jacob Kline; 9 Jack O'Dowd; Outfielders: 37 Briley Knight; 49 Patrick Mills; 22 A. J. Shaver; 17 Justin Williams	Manager: -- Craig Maddox; Coaches: -- Joel Hartman (hitting); -- Dennis Rasmussen (pitching); Disabled list; ‡ Inactive list; § Suspended list; updated July 1, 2025 Transactions

== Hall of Fame alumni ==
- George Brett (1971) Inducted, 1999
- Trevor Hoffman (1989) Inducted, 2018

== Notable alumni ==
1948
Charlie Root (Player-Manager)
1949
Larry Shepard (Player-Manager)
1950
Larry Shepard (Player-Manager)
1951
Larry Shepard (Player-Manager)
1952
Dick Stuart
1955
Bennie Daniels, Dick Stuart
1956
Ellis Burton
1957
Chris Cannizzaro, Mel Nelson
1958
Jim Hickman
1959
Whitey Kurowski (Player-Manager)
1960
Doug Clemens
1969
Rick Auerbach, Gorman Thomas, Jim Slaton
1970
Al Cowens, Greg Minton, Jim Wohlford
1971
George Brett (Baseball Hall of Fame Class of 1999), Mark Littell
1972
Jamie Quirk
1973
Ruppert Jones, Bob McClure, Rodney Scott
1974
Steve Henderson, Mike LaCoss, Ron Oester, Harry Spilman
1975
Frank Pastore, Larry Rothschild
1976
Eddie Milner
1977
Tom Foley, Joe Price, Greg Riddoch
1978
Skeeter Barnes, Nick Esasky, Gary Redus
1980
Dave Miley, Danny Tartabull
1981: Paul O'Neill
1982
Tom Browning, Kal Daniels
1983
Gary Denbo, Rob Dibble, Lenny Harris, Jeff Montgomery, Joe Oliver, Kurt Stillwell
1984
Troy MacDonald
1985
Don Wakamatsu
1986
Keith Lockhart
1987
Jack Armstrong, Butch Henry, Reggie Jefferson, Ed Taubensee
1988
Reggie Sanders, Jerry Spradlin
1989
Trevor Hoffman (Baseball Hall of Fame Class of 2018)
1992
Chad Mottola, Eric Owens, Donnie Scott (Manager)
1993
Paul Bako, Chris Sexton, Scott Sullivan, Donnie Scott (Manager)
1994
Aaron Boone, John Riedling, Donnie Scott (Manager)
1995
Ray King, Jason LaRue, John Riedling, Donnie Scott (Manager)
1996
Lance Davis
1997
Gookie Dawkins, Scott Williamson, DeWayne Wise
1998
Todd Coffey, Adam Dunn, Austin Kearns, B. J. Ryan, Russ Nixon (Manager)
1999
Ben Broussard, Scott Dunn, John Koronka, Brad Salmon, Russ Nixon (Manager)
2000
Russ Nixon (Manager), Randy Ruiz
2001
Todd Coffey, Edwin Encarnación, Rick Burleson (Manager), Ted Power (Pitching Coach)
2002
William Bergolla, Rick Burleson (Manager)
2003
Rick Burleson (Manager), Chris Dickerson, Miguel Perez, Joey Votto
2004
Paul Janish, Craig Tatum, Chris Sabo (Hitting Coach)
2005
Jay Bruce, Carlos Fisher, Sam LeCure, Adam Rosales, Jeff Stevens, Travis Wood, Rick Burleson (Manager)
2006
Danny Dorn, Juan Francisco, Chris Heisey, Marcos Mateo, Logan Ondrusek, Denis Phipps, Josh Roenicke, Jordan Smith, Drew Stubbs, Justin Turner, Chris Valaika, Rick Burleson (Manager)
2007
Scott Carroll, Enerio Del Rosario, Todd Frazier, Jeremy Horst, Curtis Partch
2008
Justin Freeman, Josh Ravin, Miguel Rojas, Dave Sappelt, Neftali Soto
2009
Daniel Corcino, Didi Gregorius, Donnie Joseph
2010
Tucker Barnhart, Billy Hamilton, Yorman Rodríguez, Delino DeShields (Manager)
2011
Tony Cingrani, Carlos Contreras, Steve Selsky, Kyle Waldrop
2012
Amir Garrett, Jon Moscot, Sal Romano, Robert Stephenson, Jesse Winker
2013
Aristides Aquino, Ben Lively, Layne Somsen, Zack Weiss, Daniel Wright
2014
Tejay Antone, Aristides Aquino, Shed Long Jr., Tyler Mahle, Dick Schofield (Manager)
2015
Tanner Rainey, Jose Siri, Tyler Stephenson, Dick Schofield (Manager)
2016
TJ Friedl, Tony Santillan, Nick Senzel, Taylor Trammell
2017
Jeter Downs, Stuart Fairchild, Hunter Greene
2018
Jonathan India
2019
Noah Davis, Nick Lodolo
2022
Jim Riggleman (Manager)
2023
Dennis Rasmussen (Pitching Coach)
