= Eddie Leishman =

American baseball player, manager and executive

- Born: December 20, 1910; Oakland, California, U.S.
- Died: December 28, 1972 (aged 62); San Diego, California, U.S.
- Stats at Baseball Reference

Teams
- As manager: Twin Falls Cowboys (1939); Spokane Indians (1940); Idaho Falls Russets (1946); As executive: Ventura Yankees (1947); Salt Lake City Bees (1950–1960); San Diego Padres (PCL) (1960–1968); San Diego Padres (1969–1972)

Edwin William Leishman (December 20, 1910 — December 28, 1972) was an American professional baseball player, manager and executive. He was the first general manager of the San Diego Padres when they joined Major League Baseball, serving from late 1968 until 1972. Immediately before, Leishman had been the GM of the Triple-A, Pacific Coast League edition of the Padres from 1960 to 1968.

== Early life ==
On December 20, 1910, Leishman was born in Oakland, California.

== Career ==
Leishman began his professional baseball career for the Hollywood Stars in 1930. Throughout the 1930s, he was a shortstop and second baseman for various minor league baseball teams, including the Newark Bears and the Binghamton Triplets. When a pitched ball in 1935 fractured his skull, Leishman ended his playing career due to his injury. In 1939, he became the manager of the Twin Falls Cowboys. After managing the Spokane Indians in 1940, he left baseball the following year to work in steel production. Leishman returned to baseball in 1946 and joined the Idaho Falls Russets as their manager.

Leishman started working with the New York Yankees' farm teams in 1947. He originally worked as a business executive for the Ventura Yankees before becoming their general manager. The same year, Leishman was named director of multiple Yankees affiliated teams including the Victoria Athletics and the Bisbee-Douglas Copper Kings. He proceeded to the Salt Lake City Bees in 1950 as their owner before becoming the Bees' general manager when they relocated to the Pacific Coast League in 1957.

Leishman stayed in the PCL as front-office boss of the San Diego Padres from 1960 to 1968, under owner C. Arnholdt Smith. When the Padres moved to the National League as an expansion team in 1969, Smith was awarded the MLB franchise. He took on Los Angeles Dodgers general manager Buzzie Bavasi as a minority owner, and named Bavasi president of the Padres. Although Bavasi was integrally involved in the team's baseball operations, Leishman was retained as general manager of the MLB Padres until his death in 1972.

During his career, Leishman was twice honored as Minor League Executive of the Year by The Sporting News, in 1959 with Salt Lake City and 1964 with San Diego. He was named the minor leagues' King of Baseball in 1966.

== Death ==
Eddie Leishman died on December 28, 1972, in San Diego, California.
