= Dylann Ceriani =

American former volleyball player

Personal information
- Born: Dylann Duncan Salt Lake City
- Education: Brigham Young University; University of California, Berkeley
- Occupation: Product development engineer
- Employer: Symbient Product Development
- Height: 6 ft 3 in (191 cm)
- Spouse: Geoff Ceriani (2008)

Sport
- Sport: Volleyball
- Position: Middle blocker
- University team: BYU Cougars
- League: Women's Western Volleyball League
- Team: San Jose Storm
- Turned pro: 1989
- Retired: 1992

Dylann Duncan Ceriani is an American former volleyball player, who played for the United States women's national volleyball team, and as a professional volleyball player in both the United States and Switzerland.

== Playing career ==
She has also received the NCAA Silver Anniversary Award in recognition of her college volleyball career, leading Brigham Young University to four successive NCAA tournament appearances, and was twice selected as an All-American player (in 1987 and 1988), and three times as a CoSIDA Academic All-American. She holds a degree in electrical and computer engineering. She is a member of BYU's athletic hall of fame, and has been described as BYU's most decorated female athlete.
