= Simplot Stadium =

Athletic stadium in Caldwell, Idaho

- Satellite view

- Location in the United States Location in Idaho
- Interactive map of Simplot Stadium
- Address: 2415 Blaine Street
- Location: Caldwell, Idaho, U.S.
- Coordinates: 43°39′14″N 116°40′15″W
- Elevation: 2,390 feet (730 m) AMSL
- Capacity: 4,826
- Surface: Artificial turf (2014–); Natural grass (1964–2013)

Construction
- Opened: 1964; 62 years ago

Simplot Stadium is an outdoor athletic stadium in the western United States, located in Caldwell, Idaho. It is primarily used for football and soccer, with a seating capacity of 4,826. The College of Idaho Coyotes men's soccer team used it as their home field for 2010 and is current home to the Coyotes football team.

Opened 62 years ago in 1964, it was the home of the Caldwell Cubs minor league baseball team of the Pioneer League. It also hosted Caldwell High School's football, baseball, and soccer games, until the completion of various on-campus stadiums in 2003.

As a football stadium, the field ran southeast to northwest, with one large concrete grandstand, along the southwest sideline, which was the third base line for baseball. The baseball diamond was aligned due north (home plate to second base), and the field was lit for night games. The elevation of the field is approximately 2,390 feet (730 m) above sea level.

Along with O'Connor Field House and Charolias Barn, Simplot Stadium is part of the Caldwell Events Center Complex. There are two other facilities on the complex, however only these three are owned by the city.
