= Derks Field =

Former minor league baseball stadium in Salt Lake City, Utah

- Location in Utah Location in the United States Location in North America
- Interactive map of Derks Field
- Former names: Community Park (1928–1940)
- Location: 1300 South & West Temple; Salt Lake City, Utah, U.S. 84101
- Coordinates: 40.741°N 111.893°W
- Owner: City of Salt Lake City
- Operator: City of Salt Lake City
- Capacity: 5,000 (1947–1957); 10,000 (1958–1993)
- Surface: Natural grass

Construction
- Groundbreaking: February 1947; 79 years ago
- Opened: 1928; 98 years ago 1947; 79 years ago
- Expanded: 1958
- Closed: 1993; 33 years ago
- Demolished: 1993; 33 years ago

Tenants
- Salt Lake City Bees (PioL/PCL) (1947–1984); Salt Lake City Trappers (PioL) (1985–1992); Salt Lake Sting (APSL) (1990–1991)

Derks Field was a minor league baseball park in the Western United States, located in Salt Lake City, Utah. It was the home field of the Salt Lake Bees, Angels, and Gulls of the Pacific Coast League, Bees, Giants, and Trappers of the Pioneer Baseball League, and the Salt Lake Sting of the American Professional Soccer League.

Opened in 1928 as Community Park, the ballpark's final seating capacity was 10,000. In 1940, it was named for Salt Lake Tribune sports editor John C. Derks.

Derks Field had replaced the previous professional ballpark, Bonneville Park (originally called Majestic Park), which was south of 900 S. between State Street and Main Street, on the site of an amusement park called the Salt Palace, which had been destroyed by fire in 1910. It operated from 1915 through 1927. As part of the construction of the new Community Park, the Bonneville stands were taken down and reassembled at the new site.

Destroyed by arson on the night of September 24, 1946, it reopened in May 1947, and was expanded in 1958 with the return of the PCL.

Major League Baseball teams occasionally played exhibition games at Derks Field, including the 1960 Pittsburgh Pirates and the 1964 Milwaukee Braves.

The field was aligned to the southeast, with a view of the Wasatch Range, and its elevation was 4,230 feet (1,290 m) above sea level. Its successor, Smith's Ballpark, opened on the same site 32 years ago in 1994.
