= Utah-Idaho Intermountain League =

Minor League Baseball league

- Classification: Independent (1900)
- Sport: Minor League Baseball
- First season: 1900
- Folded: September 19, 1900
- Replaced by: Inter-Mountain League (1901)
- President: Unknown (1900)
- No. of teams: 4
- Country: United States of America
- Most titles: 1 Ogden Lobsters (1900)
- Related competitions: Northern Utah League

The Utah–Idaho Intermountain League was an Independent baseball minor league baseball league that played in the 1900 season. As the name indicates, the four–team Utah–Idaho Intermountain League teams were based in Idaho and Utah. The Utah–Idaho Intermountain League played just the 1900 season before permanently folding.

== History ==
The Utah–Idaho Intermountain League began minor league play as an Independent four–team league, with the Ogden Lobsters, Pocatello Indians, Rio Grande Rios, and Short Line Shorts as the charter members.

On April 25, 1900, the Utah–Idaho Intermountain League officially began play, with the schedule continuing until September 19, 1900. The Ogden Lobsters won the 1900 Utah-Idaho Intermountain League Championship, ending the season with a 32–13 regular season record, finishing 4.5 games ahead of the 2nd place Rio Grande Rios (23–20). They were followed by the Pocatello Indians (21–24) and Short Line Shorts (12–23) in the final standings. There were no playoffs.

The Utah–Idaho Intermountain League permanently folded after the 1900 season ended on September 19, 1900. In 1901, the Ogden franchise and a Salt Lake City franchise joined two new clubs in another four–team league known similarly as the Inter-Mountain League.

== Utah–Idaho Intermountain League teams ==
Team name(s)	City represented	Ballpark	Year
Ogden Lobsters	Ogden, Utah	Unknown	1900
Pocatello Indians	Pocatello, Idaho	Unknown	1900
Rio Grande Rios	Salt Lake City, Utah	Unknown	1900
Short Line Shorts	Salt Lake City, Utah	Unknown	1900

== League standings ==
1900 Utah–Idaho Intermountain League

Team standings	W	L	PCT	GB	Managers
Ogden Lobsters	32	13	.711	–	Dad Gimlin
Rio Grande Rios	23	20	.534	4½	Dan Hickey / Dud Risley
Pocatello Indians	21	24	.432	5½	Billy Trapp
Short Line Shorts	12	23	.342	10	Clippinger
