= Lagoon Farmers =

- 1901–1902; Farmington, Utah

Minor league affiliations
- Class: Independent (1901–1902)
- League: Inter-Mountain League (1901); Utah State League (1902)

Major league affiliations
- Team: None

Minor league titles
- League titles: None

Team data
- Name: Lagoon Farmers (1901); Lagoon (1902)
- Ballpark: Lagoon Resort Park (1901–1902)

The Lagoon Farmers was the initial moniker of the minor league baseball teams based in Farmington, Utah, on the private grounds of the Lagoon Amusement Park, in 1901 and 1902. Lagoon teams played as members of the 1901 Inter-Mountain League and 1902 Utah State League.

== History ==
Lagoon first began play in 1901, becoming members of the Inter-Mountain League during the season. The Inter-Mountain League was an independent minor league baseball league. The league played in the 1901 season and fielded four clubs, all in Utah, with Farmington, Utah/Lagoon joining teams from Ogden, Utah, Park City, Utah and Salt Lake City, Utah in league play.

On June 8, 1901, the Railway Ducks, with a 5–7 record, sold the franchise to the owner of the Lagoon Resort. The Salt Lake City based Railway Ducks relocated to become the "Lagoon Farmers."

In the final 1901 standings, the Lagoon Farmers finished in third place. The Ogden Lobsters won the championship with a 31–10 record, followed by the Salt Lake City White Wings (26–15), Railway Ducks / Lagoon Farmers (23–19) and Park City Miners (3–39). Park City folded during the season and the rest of their scheduled games were forfeited, as reflected in the final standings. The Railway/Lagoon team was managed by James Clippinger and John Crichlow and finished 8.5 games behind the first place Ogden Lobsters in the final standings. Lagoon pitcher Harry Newmeyer led the Inter-Mountain League with 129 strikeouts.

The Lagoon team continued play in 1902, as the Utah State League formed and began minor league play as an Independent four–team league. The Utah State League was formed with teams in Lagoon, Utah, Logan, Utah, Ogden, Utah and Salt Lake City, Utah teams as the charter members. Lagoon was managed by Farmer Weaver and the 1902 team has no referenced moniker.

The Utah State League permanently folded as a minor league after the 1902 season. The team records and standings for the 1902 league are unknown, but rosters exist. Lagoon/Farmington has not hosted another minor league team.

== The ballpark ==
Lagoon teams were noted to have played minor league home games on the Lagoon Resort grounds. A 1911 map shows the ballpark next to the "Lagoon Summer Resort & Picnic Grounds". The site is still a resort and amusement park today, located in Farmington, Utah.

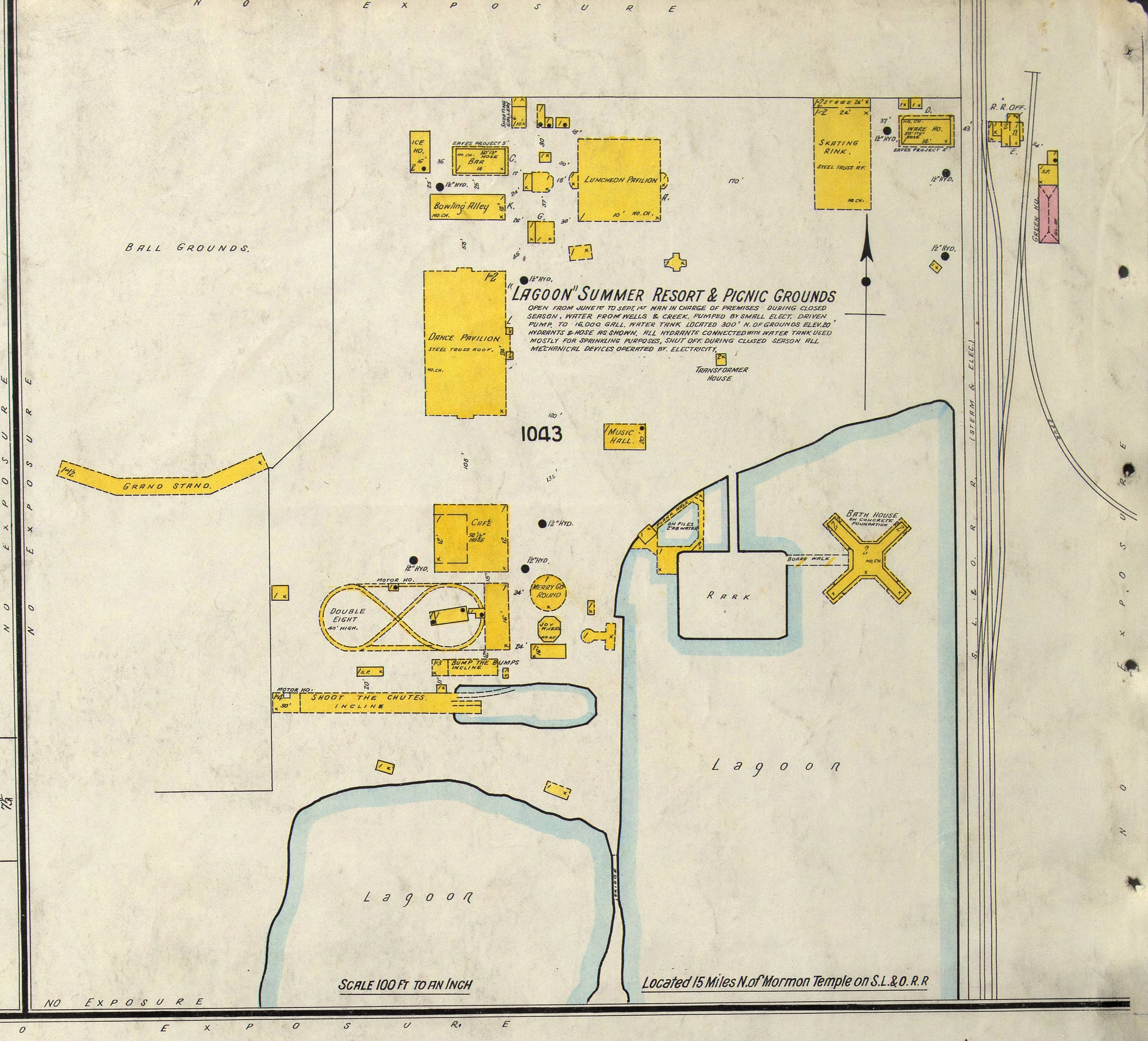
(1911) Sanborn Map of Lagoon with ballpark location

== Timeline ==
| Year(s) | # Yrs. | Team | Level | League | Ballpark |
|---|---|---|---|---|---|
| 1901 | 1 | Lagoon Farmers | Independent | Utah State League | Lagoon Resort Ballpark |
| 1902 | 1 | Lagoon | Independent | Utah State League | Lagoon Resort Ballpark |

== Year–by–year records ==
| Year | Record | Finish | Manager | Playoffs/Notes |
|---|---|---|---|---|
| 1901 | 23–19 | 3rd | James Clippinger / John Crichlow | 18–12 as Lagoon |
| 1902 | NA | NA | Farmer Weaver | standings unknown |

== Notable alumni ==
- Joe Kostal (1901)
- Farmer Weaver (1901) (1902, MGR)

== See also ==
- Lagoon (minor league baseball) players
