= KPNZ =

Television station in Ogden, Utah

- Ogden–Salt Lake City, Utah; United States
- City: Ogden, Utah
- Channels: Digital: 24 (UHF); Virtual: 24

Programming
- Affiliations: 24.1: TCT; for others, see § Subchannels

Ownership
- Owner: Total Christian Television; (Faith Broadcasting Network, Inc.)

History
- First air date: December 6, 1998
- Former call signs: KAZG (1998–2000)
- Former channel numbers: Analog: 24 (UHF, 1998–2009)
- Former affiliations: Independent (1998–2000, 2006–2009); UPN (2001–2006); Estrella TV (2009–2018); Azteca América (2018–2021)
- Call sign meaning: UPN (former affiliation); "Z" ("zz" suffixation unique to Utah inspired by the Jazz)

Technical information
- Licensing authority: FCC
- Facility ID: 77512
- ERP: 450 kW
- HAAT: 1,229 m (4,032 ft)
- Transmitter coordinates: 40°39′33″N 112°12′10″W

Links
- Public license information: Public file; LMS
- Website: www.tct.tv

KPNZ (channel 24) is a religious television station licensed to Ogden, Utah, United States, serving the Salt Lake City area. The station is owned by Total Christian Television (TCT). KPNZ's studios are located on North Wright Brothers Drive in northwest Salt Lake City, and its transmitter is located on Farnsworth Peak in the Oquirrh Mountains.

== History ==
The station first signed on the air on December 6, 1998, as KAZG, originally operating as an independent station. It became the Salt Lake City market's UPN affiliate, after the network disaffiliated from KJZZ-TV (channel 14) in January 2001. This change came about due to several factors, most notably a disagreement over affiliate compensation, preemption terms, and what KJZZ ownership saw as the lack of financial viability of urban-themed programming in the Salt Lake City market. In October 2000, KJZZ made national headlines when it demanded the right to back out of its UPN contract if UPN increased its "urban/ethnic programming" to more than two hours per week. UPN responded by moving their programming to KAZG, which then changed its call letters to KPNZ. In August 2001, the station moved its operations from its original studio facility in Ogden to the International Center in Salt Lake City.

On January 24, 2006, the Warner Bros. unit of Time Warner and CBS Corporation announced that the two companies would shut down The WB and UPN and combine the networks' respective programming to create a new "fifth" network called The CW. Later that year, KPNZ stopped using UPN branding on its website, referring to the station as "Utah's 24". On June 5, 2006, KPNZ removed UPN programming from its schedule in retaliation for being passed over by both The CW (which went to former WB affiliate KUWB, channel 30, now KUCW) and another new netlet, News Corporation's MyNetworkTV (which at the time went to KJZZ-TV, which has since reverted to independent status).

On May 30, 2007, Utah Communications, LLC, the licensee of KPNZ, filed an application with the Federal Communications Commission (FCC) to sell the station to Liberman Broadcasting, a media company whose television properties operated as Spanish-language independent stations at the time. The sale was completed on November 30, 2007. After Liberman took over, it continued to broadcast entirely in English until February 2008, when it officially adopted a Spanish-language programming format. On September 14, 2009, KPNZ and the other Liberman television stations became owned-and-operated stations of the new Spanish-language network Estrella TV.

On June 20, 2018, Liberman announced it was selling KPNZ to HC2 Holdings; the sale was completed on October 26. Upon the sale's completion, the station's affiliation was changed to Azteca América, a network owned by HC2 Holdings.

On March 18, 2021, it was announced that KPNZ and sister station KWKB in Iowa City, Iowa, would be sold to Marion, Illinois–based Total Christian Television for $4 million. The sale was completed on August 2.

== Legal battles ==
In May 2005, human resources director/accounting manager Brad Brewer was fired from KPNZ for embezzlement. Two months later, Brewer, general manager Kurt Gentry and traffic manager Bonnie Dunn were arrested by Salt Lake City Police on charges of theft, fraud and forgery. The charges against Gentry were dropped after investigation by the Salt Lake County District Attorney's Office. Charges against Dunn were dismissed in court as well. Brewer was charged with 31 separate counts and has since settled. The circumstances behind the arrests and dismantling of KPNZ are still unclear, though many rumors have been made public by partners, former employees and clients.

In February 2014, KPNZ was involved in the FCC ruling to pay a $9,000 fine. This was due to the station "willfully and repeatedly violat[ing] Section 11.35(a) of the Commission's rules...by failing to maintain operational Emergency Alert System (EAS) equipment and logs."

== Technical information ==
=== Subchannels ===
The station's signal is multiplexed:

Subchannels of KPNZ
Subchannel	Res.	Short name	Programming
24.1	720p	KPNZ HD	TCT
24.2	480i	JTV	Jewelry TV
24.3	480i	SBN	SonLife
24.4	480i	ShopLC	Shop LC
24.5	480i	BuzzrTV	Buzzr
24.6	480i	BizTV	Biz TV
24.7	480i	Heart	Heartland

=== Analog-to-digital conversion ===
Because it was granted an original construction permit after the FCC finalized the DTV allotment plan on April 21, 1997, the station did not receive a companion channel for a digital television station. Instead, when KPNZ shut down its analog signal, over UHF channel 24, on June 12, 2009. The station "flash-cut" its digital signal into operation UHF channel 24.
