= Halliwell Park =

Stadium in Pocatello, Idaho

Coordinates: 42.89219°N 112.473521°W

Halliwell Park is a stadium in Pocatello, Idaho. The stadium is located at 1100 W. Alameda. It is primarily used for baseball and was the home of Pocatello Giants. The ballpark has a capacity of 2,580 people.

== Current users ==
The park serves as a home for the Gate City Grays of the Northern Utah League, as well as the three local high school boys baseball programs of Pocatello, Highland, and Century High schools. The field also hosts American Legion baseball in the summer.
