= Magic Valley Cowboys =

Defunct professional baseball team

- (1952–1958, 1961–1966, 1968–1971); Twin Falls, Idaho

Minor league affiliations
- Class: Class C (1952–1958, 1961–1962); Class A (1963); Rookie (1964–1966, 1968–1971)
- League: Pioneer League

Major league affiliations
- Team: Chicago Cubs (1954–1958); Philadelphia Phillies (1961–1963); San Francisco Giants (1964–1966); Atlanta Braves (1968–1970)

Minor league titles
- League titles (1): 1955

Team data
- Ballpark: Jaycee Field

The Magic Valley Cowboys were a minor league baseball team in the Pioneer League for a total of 17 seasons between 1952 and 1971. The team was based in Twin Falls, Idaho — the largest city within the Magic Valley region — and succeeded the Twin Falls Cowboys. The team played at Jaycee Field, located in the northeast corner of the city's Harmon Park.

== History ==
The Magic Valley Cowboys competed at the Class C level (1952–58, 1961–62), the Class A level (1963), and the Rookie level (1964–66, 1968–71). At different times, they were affiliated with four National League teams; the Chicago Cubs (1954–58), the Philadelphia Phillies (1961–63), the San Francisco Giants (1964–66), and the Atlanta Braves (1968–70).

Magic Valley's one league championship came in 1955, when the Cowboys finished the regular season in fourth place, then defeated the Boise Braves and the Pocatello Bannocks in the playoffs.

== Season records ==
Season	Class	Affiliation	Record	Win %	Finish	Playoffs	Ref
1952	C	none	55–77	.417	7th (tie)		
1953	C	none	48–83	.366	7th		
1954	C	Chicago Cubs	67–65	.508	5th		
1955	C	Chicago Cubs	64–67	.489	4th	champions	
1956	C	Chicago Cubs	69–63	.523	4th (tie)		
1957	C	Chicago Cubs	60–66	.476	6th		
1958	C	Chicago Cubs	58–74	.439	6th		
1959	no team						
1960	no team						
1961	C	Philadelphia Phillies	64–66	.492	4th		
1962	C	Philadelphia Phillies	64–65	.496	3rd		
1963	A	Philadelphia Phillies	84–44	.656	1st	lost in first round	
1964	Rookie	San Francisco Giants	33–32	.508	2nd		
1965	Rookie	San Francisco Giants	33–33	.500	2nd (tie)		
1966	Rookie	San Francisco Giants	28–38	.424	4th		
1967	no team						
1968	Rookie	Atlanta Braves	30–31	.492	4th		
1969	Rookie	Atlanta Braves	39–33	.542	3rd		
1970	Rookie	Atlanta Braves	41–29	.586	3rd		
1971	Rookie	none	36–34	.514	3rd (tie)		

== All-stars ==
Season	Name & Position
1954	Charles Jorgenson, P
1955	Daniel Lobitz, 1B; Bob Shaffer, P
1956	Robert Pascal, 1B; Duane Hermon, OF; Samual Mauney, C John Buzhardt, P
1961	Costen Shockley, 1B; Bobby Sanders, OF; Victor Baron, C Joel Gibson, P
1962	Harold "Hank" Allen, 1B; Adolfo Phillips, OF; Ferdinand Walters, C Jack Phillips, Mgr.
1963	Alex Johnson, OF; Gene Kerns, OF; Nolen Campbell, IF; George Bechtold, P
1966	Jay Reed, OF; John Harrell, C Don DeSousa, Util. Robert "Bob" Reynolds, P
1968	Larry LeGarde, OF; Curtis Moore, Util.
1969	Mickey Rivers, OF
1970	Marc Meno, 3B
1971	Dominic Gaudioso, C

== Notable alumni ==
- Dick Allen
- Larvell Blanks
- Ron Bryant
- Ken Henderson
- Alex Johnson
- Grady Little
- Mike Marshall
- Jerry Remy
- Mickey Rivers
- Al Zarilla

== See also ==
- Magic Valley Cowboys players
