= Utah State League =

- Formerly: Inter-Mountain League (1901)
- Classification: Independent (1902)
- Sport: Minor League Baseball
- First season: 1902
- Folded: 1902
- President: Unknown (1902)
- No. of teams: 4
- Country: United States of America
- Most titles: Unknown (1902)

The Utah State League was an Independent baseball minor league baseball league that played in the 1902 season. As the name indicates, the four–team Utah State League consisted of teams based in Utah. The Utah State League played just the 1902 season before permanently folding.

== History ==
The Utah State League began minor league play as an Independent four–team league in 1902. The Utah State League was formed with teams in Lagoon, Utah, Logan, Utah, Ogden, Utah and Salt Lake City, Utah as the charter members.

In the previous season of 1901, the Ogden Lobsters, Railway Ducks/Lagoon Farmers, Park City Miners and Salt Lake City White Wings teams played as members the four–team Class D level Inter-Mountain League, which folded after the 1901 season.

The Utah State League permanently folded as a minor league after the 1902 season. The team records and standings for the 1902 league are unknown, but rosters exist. Numerous Independent and semi–professional teams later played in leagues under the "Utah State League" name in various seasons.

== Utah State League teams ==
Team name(s)	City represented	Manager	Year
Lagoon	Lagoon, Utah	Farmer Weaver	1902
Logan	Logan, Utah	Harry Stovey	1902
Ogden	Ogden, Utah	Frank Gimlin	1902
Salt Lake City	Salt Lake City, Utah	George Borchers	1902

== 1902 standings ==
The team standings for the 1902 Utah State League are unknown.
