= Glacier Bank Park =

Baseball stadium in Montana, United States

- Former names: Flathead Field (2022–2023)
- Address: 25 McDermott Lane; Kalispell, MT; United States
- Coordinates: 48.2974°N 114.3378°W
- Capacity: 2,500 (4,000 with lawn seating)
- Opened: 2022

Website
- https://www.gorangeriders.com/Flathead_Field

Glacier Bank Park (formerly Flathead Field) is a baseball stadium located in the Flathead Valley, north of Kalispell, Montana. It is home to the Glacier Range Riders of the Pioneer League.

== Background ==
The stadium, which opened in 2022 as Flathead Field, seats 2,500 people, with a total capacity of around 4,000, including lawn seating. Over 85,000 spectators attended during its inaugural season. In 2023, the stadium was renamed Glacier Bank Park after Glacier Bank purchased the naming rights under a 10-year agreement running through 2033.

== Design and features ==
Glacier Bank Park was designed to maximize fan experience while harmonizing with the natural beauty of the Flathead Valley. The stadium seats approximately 2,500 spectators in individual seatback chairs, with lawn areas accommodating an additional 1,500 fans. It includes 19 luxury suites for premium viewing, as well as event spaces with meeting rooms capable of hosting up to 500 people, suitable for community gatherings and corporate functions. Family-friendly amenities include a children's playground and open viewing areas, and visitors can also enjoy traditional ballpark concessions and a team store. The stadium is fully ADA-compliant, ensuring accessibility for all guests. The field itself measures 328 feet to left field, 406 feet to center, and 338 feet to right, providing a professional-quality playing surface for the Glacier Range Riders and other events.

The field dimensions are 328 ft to left field, 406 ft to center field, and 338 ft to right field.

== Events and community ==
Glacier Bank Park hosts concerts, community events, and nonprofit fundraisers. Its first concert took place on July 11, 2025, featuring country artists Tyler Rich, Scotty Hasting, and Maggie Baugh with a fireworks show. The stadium also serves as a hub for local nonprofit events.

== Recognition ==
In 2023, the stadium received "Ballpark of the Year" recognition for design and fan experience. It was also voted top ballpark across all MLB Partner Leagues in a fan poll.
