= Park City Miners =

- 1901; Park City, Utah

Minor league affiliations
- Class: Independent (1901)
- League: Inter-Mountain League (1901)

Major league affiliations
- Team: None

Minor league titles
- League titles (0): None

Team data
- Name: Park City Miners (1901)
- Ballpark: Unknown (1901)

The Park City Miners were a minor league baseball team based in Park City, Utah. In 1901, the Miners played a partial season as members of the Independent level Inter-Mountain League, finishing in fourth place in the only year of minor league play for the Park City franchise.

== History ==
Minor league baseball was first hosted in Park City, Utah in 1901, when the "Park City Miners" became charter members of the Inter-Mountain League. The league was an Independent level league that featured four clubs, all in Utah. The Ogden Lobsters, Salt Lake City White Wings and Railway Ducks / Lagoon Farmers teams joined the Park City Miners as charter members.

The "Miners" moniker was in reference to local industry, as Park City and the immediate area was home to silver mining, including the Ontario silver mine.

The Park City Miners finished in fourth place in 1901. The Park City franchise disbanded on July 15, 1901, and all remaining games were forfeited. Playing in the newly created four-team league, the Park City Miners had a 3–20 record when the team disbanded. Park City finished behind the Ogden Lobsters (31–10), Salt Lake City White Wings (26–15), Railway Ducks / Lagoon Farmers (23–19) in the standings. The Park City Miners finished with an accredited record of 3–39, playing the season under manager H.S. Townsend, after the forfeits were applied. Parks City finished 28.5 games behind the first place Ogden Lobsters in the final standings, as Ogden finished with a 31–10 record. The Inter-Mountain League folded after the 1901 season and Park City has not hosted another minor league team.

Today, the "Miners" moniker has been adopted by the athletic teams at Park City High School.

== The ballpark ==
The name of the Park City home minor league ballpark in 1901 is unknown.

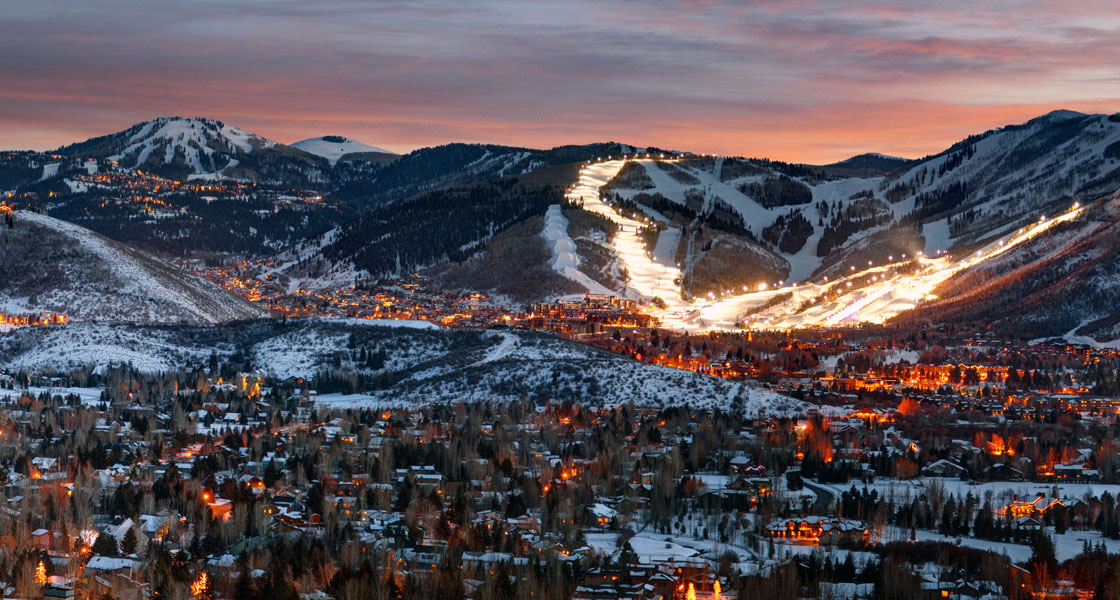
(2013) Park City, Utah

== Timeline ==
Year(s)	# Yrs.	Team	Level	League
1901	1	Park City Miners	Independent	Inter-Mountain League

== Year-by-year record ==
Year	Record	Finish	Manager	Playoffs
1901	3–39*	4th	H.S. Townsend	Team disbanded July 14 (3-20); All 19 remaining games forfeited

== Notable alumni ==
No alumni of Park City reached the major leagues.
