= Caldwell Cubs =

Coordinates: 43.654°N 116.671°W

- 1964–1971; Caldwell, Idaho

Minor league affiliations
- Class: Rookie (1964–1971)
- League: Pioneer League (1964–1971)

Major league affiliations
- Team: Chicago Cubs (1964–1971)

Minor league titles
- League titles (2): 1964; 1965

Team data
- Name: Caldwell Cubs (1967–1971); Treasure Valley Cubs (1964–1966)
- Ballpark: Simplot Stadium (1964–1971)

The Caldwell Cubs were a Minor League Baseball team that played in the Pioneer League. The Caldwell Cubs were located in the western United States, in the town of Caldwell, Idaho, west of Boise.

== History ==
A rookie league affiliate of the Chicago Cubs, the team played in the Pioneer League from 1964 through 1971, and their home field was Simplot Stadium in Caldwell. During their first three seasons, they were known as the Treasure Valley Cubs as nearby Boise had lost its minor league team after the 1963 season.

The Treasure Valley Cubs were champions of the Pioneer League in their first two seasons, and were runners-up in 1966. Lack of attendance was cited as the reason for the club's demise in January 1972; they drew only 11,000 at home during the 1971 season, an average of 315 per game.

== Ballpark ==
The Caldwell Cubs played at Simplot Stadium, at 2415 Blaine Street in Caldwell. Part of the Canyon County Fairgrounds, the venue is still in use today by the teams of the College of Idaho.

(2011) Simplot Stadium. Caldwell, Idaho

== Notable alumni ==
- Joe Decker (1965)
- Oscar Gamble (1968)
- Ken Holtzman (1965) 2x MLB All-Star
- Pete LaCock (1970)
- Dennis Lamp (1971)
- Joe Niekro (1966) MLB All-Star
- Billy North (1969) 2x AL Stolen Base Leader
- Frank Reberger (1966) Caldwell Native
- Ken Rudolph (1965)
- Bill Stoneman (1966) MLB All-Star
- Caldwell Cubs players
- Treasure Valley Cubs players
