= Utah Saints (AIFA) =

American professional indoor football team

- Founded: 2008
- League: American Indoor Football Association
- Team history: Utah Saints (2008)
- Based in: Kearns, Utah
- Arena: Utah Olympic Oval
- Colors: Black, Red, White
- President: Michael Curran
- Head coach: TBD
- Championships: 0

The Utah Saints was a team of the American Indoor Football Association that played in 2008. They played their home games at the Utah Olympic Oval in Kearns, Utah, a suburb of Salt Lake City. The Oval is best known for being a venue of the 2002 Winter Olympics, known as the "Fastest Ice On Earth," and was expanded to 2,500 for Saints games.

The team was owned by Michael Curran, previously owner of the PIFL's Utah Catzz, and later on founder and CEO of the Utah Indoor Football League.

The team name is a reference to the Church of Jesus Christ of Latter-day Saints (Mormons), which is the preferred religion of 58% of Utah's adult population.

== Season-by-season ==
Season records
Season	W	L	T	Finish	Playoff results
2008	1	13	0	4th WC West	--
