= Twin Falls Cowboys =

Defunct professional baseball team

- (1939–1942, 1946–1951); Twin Falls, Idaho

Minor league affiliations
- Class: Class C
- League: Pioneer League

Major league affiliations
- Team: Seattle Rainiers (PCL) (1939); New York Yankees (1946–1951)

Minor league titles
- League titles (3): 1939; 1947; 1948

Team data
- Ballpark: Jaycee Field

The Twin Falls Cowboys were a Class C minor league baseball team from 1939 to 1942 and 1946 to 1951 in the Pioneer League. Their affiliation was with the Seattle Rainiers in 1939, and later the New York Yankees from 1946 to 1951. The Cowboys played at Jaycee Field in Twin Falls, Idaho, located in the northeast corner of the city's Harmon Park.

== History ==
1939 championship team

The Cowboys' home ballpark was constructed during the spring of 1939, as a WPA project costing $30,000. The team's first Pioneer League game was played on May 2, 1939, when they lost an away game to the Pocatello Cardinals by a score of 17–1. The Cowboy's first home game in Twin Falls was played on May 5, when the Cowboys again lost to the Cardinals, 6–3.

Statistics for the team between the 1939 and 1949 seasons are incomplete; also, the league did not operate from 1943 to 1945 due to World War II. Records do show that the Cowboys were the Pioneer League champions three times; 1939, 1947, and 1948.

The Cowboys were second in the Pioneer League in 1950, posting a 76–50 record under manager Wally Berger. Ray Posipanka hit 32 home runs for the Cowboys, leading the team; Svend Jessen contributed 25 more home runs en route to posting a league leading 141 team home runs during the 136 game season.

Second baseman Don Trower took over as manager in the 1951 season, in which the Cowboys went 71–68. However, the team lost its biggest offensive threat in Dick Conway, a 6 feet 3 inches (1.91 m) tall catcher from Lynn, Massachusetts. Conway, 19, was in his first season of professional baseball and leading the Pioneer League in home runs (12) at the time of his death. He was killed during a pre-game warm-up in Ogden, Utah, on June 29, 1951, when he was struck over the heart by a throw from Trower while distracted; he died within minutes of the impact.

In 1952, the Magic Valley Cowboys became Twin Falls' team in the Pioneer League; meanwhile the Boise Yankees became New York's minor league affiliate in the Pioneer League.

== Season records ==
Season	Manager(s)	W–L	Win %	Finish	Playoffs	Ref
1939	Eddie Leishman; Wes Schulmerich; Charles Wry	72–52	.581	1st	champions†	
1940	Frank Tobin; Ray Jacobs	53–76	.411	6th	none	
1941	Andy Harrington	39–90	.302	6th	none	
1942	Tony Robello	51–67	.432	5th	none	
1943–45	league paused due to World War II					
1946	Earl Bolyard	72–56	.563	2nd	lost in finals	
1947	Earl Bolyard	77–60	.562	2nd	champions	
1948	Charlie Metro	75–51	.595	2nd	champions	
1949	Charlie Metro	78–47	.624	1st	lost in first round	
1950	Wally Berger	76–50	.603	2nd	lost in finals	
1951	Don Trower	71–68	.511	4th	lost in finals	

† The league did not hold playoffs in 1939; the Cowboys became champions by finishing first in league standings.

== All-stars ==
Season	Name & Position
1939	Ernest "Ernie" Bishop, 2B; Joseph "Joe" McNamee, C Charles Wry, P
1940	Pete Hughes, OF
1947	Jack Radtke, 2B; George Leyrer, OF; Charles "Chuck" Balassi, OF; Harold "Hal" Danielson, C Walter Eads, P Earl Bolyard, Mgr.
1948	Gil McDougald, 2B; Harold "Hal" Danielson, C Dale Maycock, P
1949	Svend "Red" Jessen, 1B; Bill Renna, OF; Otto Schroeder, P
1950	Svend "Red" Jessen, 1B; Ray Posipanka, 3B; Ivan Abromowitz, P
1951	Vern Campbell, OF; James "Jim" Russell, P

== Notable players ==
- Woodie Held
- Jack Lohrke
- Gil McDougald
- Charlie Metro
- Gus Triandos

== See also ==
- Twin Falls Cowboys players
