= Professional Developmental Football League =

The Professional Developmental Football League (PDFL) is a minor league American football league that was established in the winter of 2008 and began play in 2009. The league is centered on developing players for the National Football League. Its four current teams are divided into two conferences: the National Development Conference and the American Development Conference. The league's goal is to have ten teams, with five in each conference.

== Teams ==
- Seattle-Tacoma Cobras – based in Renton, Washington
- Vancouver Blackhawks – based in Vancouver, Washington
- Clarksville Warhawks – based in Clarksville, Tennessee
- Miami Crush – based in Miami, Florida
