= Glacier Range Riders =

American minor-league professional baseball team

- Founded in 2021; Kalispell, Montana
Team logo
Cap insignia

Minor league affiliations
- Class: Independent
- League: Pioneer League

Team data
- Colors: Red, black, olive, sienna, white
- Mascots: Cliff & Huck
- Ballpark: Glacier Bank Park
- Owner/ Operator: Ridge Run Baseball LLC
- President: Marty Kelly
- General manager: Chris Kelly
- Manager: Todd Pratt
- Website: gorangeriders.com

The Glacier Range Riders are an independent baseball team of the Pioneer League, an MLB Partner League, who began play in 2022. They are located in Kalispell, Montana, and play their home games at Glacier Bank Park.

== History ==
With the contraction of Minor League Baseball in 2021, the Pioneer League was converted from an MLB-affiliated Rookie Advanced league to an independent baseball league and granted status as an MLB Partner League.

With the transition, the Pioneer League added the Boise Hawks, a former member of the Northwest League, for the 2021 season. To keep the league at eight teams, the Northern Colorado Owlz (formerly the Orem Owlz) sat out 2021. With the return of the Owlz for 2022, a 10th team was needed to balance the schedule, and on August 16, 2021, Ridge Run Baseball LLC was awarded an expansion team to begin play in 2022.

The announcement also revealed that a new ballpark would be constructed alongside U.S. Route 93 north of Kalispell. Glacier Bank Park, originally known as Flathead Field, seats 2,500 and features artificial turf.

The franchise debuted on May 23, 2022, against the Rocky Mountain Vibes, and they hosted their first home game on June 14 against the Billings Mustangs.

== Roster ==
Glacier Range Riders roster
| Active (25-man) roster | Coaching staff |
|---|---|
| Pitchers: 13 Noah Barros; 1 Jonathan Clark; 19 Ryan Cloude; 37 Justin Coleman; 16 Luke Dawson; 5 Ben Ferrer; 34 Lyle Hibbitts; 35 Connor Housley; 27 Joe Kinsky; 15 Patrick Miner; 28 John Natoli; 24 Jonathan Pintaro; -- Montana Quigley; 17 Roy Robles; 39 Nathan Thomas; 3 Jack White; 29 Michael YaSenka; 38 Nick Zegna; Catchers: 4 Austin Bates; 11 Matt Clayton; -- Keenan O'Brien; -- Drew Sims; Infielders: 23 Mason Dinesen; 6 Benjamin Fitzgerald; 8 Colin Gordon; 10 Gabe Howell; -- Jake MacKenzie; 14 Jackson Raper; Outfielders: 12 Christian Kirtley; 20 Kingston Liniak; 7 Nick Lucky; 30 Dean Miller; 32 Crews Taylor | Manager: -- Todd Pratt; Coaches: -- Glendon Rusch (pitching); Disabled list; ‡ Inactive list; § Suspended list; updated August 7, 2023 Transactions |
