= Ogden Reds =

- (1939–42, 1946–55); Ogden, Utah

Minor league affiliations
- Previous classes: Class C
- Previous leagues: Pioneer League

Major league affiliations
- Previous teams: Cincinnati Reds

Minor league titles
- League titles (2): 1940; 1941

Team data
- Previous parks: John Affleck Park (demolished) (41.201°N 111.981°W)

The Ogden Reds were a minor league baseball team in the western United States, based in Ogden, Utah. They played in the Pioneer League for a total of 14 seasons between 1939 and 1955. They were affiliated with the Cincinnati Reds of Major League Baseball (MLB), and played at the Class C level. The team's home field was John Affleck Park.

== History ==
The Reds were one of the six original teams of the Pioneer League when it was formed in 1939. The Reds were league champions in 1940 and 1941, finishing in fourth place and second place, respectively, during the regular season before winning the postseason playoffs. The team competed through the 1955 season, except for three years during World War II when the league did not operate. Hall of Fame inductee Frank Robinson played for the Reds in 1953. After the Reds' final season in Ogden, the city would not have another minor league team until the Ogden Dodgers arrived in 1966.

== Season records ==
Season	Manager(s)	W–L	Win %	Finish	Playoffs	Ref
1939	Bill McCorry	58–66	.468	5th	no playoffs held	
1940	Bill McCorry	64–66	.492	4th	champions	
1941	Bill McCorry	76–51	.598	2nd	champions	
1942	Bill McCorry	50–69	.420	6th	none	
1943–45	league paused due to World War II					
1946	Jim Keesey	68–59	.535	3rd	none	
1947	Pip Koehler	77–61	.558	3rd	none	
1948	Pip Koehler; Bobby Mattick	61–65	.484	4th	lost in first round	
1949	Ham Schulte	58–68	.460	6th	none	
1950	Cecil Scheffel	58–68	.460	5th	none	
1951	Cecil Scheffel	78–61	.561	2nd	lost in first round	
1952	Dee Moore	55–77	.417	7th	none	
1953	Earle Brucker Sr.	89–42	.679	1st	lost in first round	
1954	Earle Brucker Sr.	61–71	.462	6th	none	
1955	Jimmie Crandall; Red Treadway	54–78	.409	8th	none	

== All-stars ==
Season	Name & Position
1939	Chester Rosenlund, 3B; Pete Hughes, OF; Joe Serpa, Util.
1940	Dale Laybourne, SS; Pete Hughes, OF
1941	Tom Canavan, 1B; Mike Winseck, 3B; Frank Baumholtz, OF; Ken Polivka, P Bill McCorry, Mgr.
1949	Billy Ford, 3B
1950	Cliff Ross, P
1951	Ron Harrison, OF
1952	Steve Mesner, 3B
1953	Lazaro Terry, SS; Frank Robinson, OF; Carl Wells, P Allen Flauger, P
1954	William Newkirk, 1B; Kenneth Hommel, P
1955	Drew Gilbert, OF

== Notable alumni ==
=== Baseball Hall of Fame alumni ===
- Frank Robinson (1953) Inducted 1982

=== Notable alumni ===
- Ed Bailey
- Dave Bristol
- Frank Baumholtz
- Dale Long
- Bobby Mattick
- Ogden Reds players
