= Women's Western Volleyball League =

The Women's Western Volleyball League (WWVL) was a women's volleyball league created by Ralph Christ in August 1992. It was around for two seasons in 1993 and 1994.

The inaugural 1993 season finished with the San Diego Wave capturing the league championship; Wave hitter Missy McLinden was named the league's Most Valuable Player. In 1994 the champions were the San Diego Breakers. The Wave was the same team but it was sold and became the Breakers.

Franchises:

- Las Vegas Vipers (Second year)
- Orange County Diggers (Second year) (Were Ventura Slammers)
- Sacramento Stars (Played in both seasons)
- Salinas Aces (Never played)
- San Jose Storm (Played in both seasons)
- San Bernardino Jazz (Played in both seasons)
- Santa Monica Sharks (First year only)
- San Diego Wave (Played first year)
- San Diego Breakers (Played in season two) (Same team as Wave, but Wave were sold and became Breakers.)
- Utah Predators (Played second season)
- Ventura Slammers (Played first year) (Became Orange County Diggers)
