= Inter-Mountain League =

Former American baseball competition

- Classification: Independent (1901); Class D (1909)
- Sport: Minor League Baseball
- First season: 1901
- Folded: 1909
- Replaced by: Utah State League (1902)
- President: William Henry Lucas (1901, 1909)
- No. of teams: 9
- Country: United States of America
- Most titles: 1 Ogden Lobsters (1901); Helena Senators (1909)

The Inter–Mountain League was a minor league baseball league that played in the 1901 and 1909 baseball seasons. League franchises were based in Idaho, Montana and Utah.

== History ==
The 1901 Inter–Mountain League was an Independent league that fielded four clubs, all based in Utah: the Ogden Lobsters, Salt Lake City White Wings, Railway Ducks/Lagoon Farmers and Park City Miners. The league folded after the 1901 season, with the forming of the 1902 Utah State League.

The league reformed in 1909. The 1909 Inter–Mountain League was a Class D level minor league, comprising the Helena Senators, Salt Lake City Mormons (moved to Livingston), Butte Miners and Boise Irrigators (moved to become Bozeman Irrigators. The Inter–Mountain league permanently disbanded on July 25, 1909.

== Cities represented ==
- Boise, ID: Boise Irrigators 1909
- Bozeman, MT: Bozeman Irrigators 1909
- Butte, MT: Butte Miners 1909
- Farmington, UT: Lagoon Farmers 1901
- Helena, MT: Helena Senators 1909
- Livingston, MT: Livingston 1909
- Ogden, UT: Ogden Lobsters 1901
- Park City, UT: Park City Miners 1901
- Salt Lake City, UT: Salt Lake City White Wings 1901; Salt Lake City, UT: Salt Lake City Mormons 1909

== Standings and statistics ==
=== 1901 ===
schedule

Team standings	W	L	PCT	GB	Managers
Ogden Lobsters	31	10	.756	–	Dad Gimlin
Salt Lake City White Wings	26	15	.634	5.0	C.H. Griffin
Railway Ducks / Lagoon Farmers	23	19	.548	8.5	James Clippinger / John Crichlow
Park City Miners	3	39	.071	28.5	H.S. Townsend

Railway (5–7) sold franchise to the owner of Lagoon Resort, June 8
Park City disbanded July 15 with remaining games forfeited.

Player statistics
Player	Team	Stat	Tot	Player	Team	Stat	Tot
Homer Chase Hausen	Ogden	BA	.438	George Borchers	Ogden	W	15
Pearl Casey	Ogden	Runs	51	Harry Newmeyer	Lagoon	SO	129
Homer Chase Hausen	Ogden	Hits	67	Edwin Kidder	Railway/Salt Lake City	PCT	.857 6–1
Homer Chase Hausen	Ogden	HR	3				

=== 1909 ===
schedule

Team standings	W	L	PCT	GB	Managers
Helena Senators	43	19	.694	–	John Huston
Salt Lake City Mormons / Livingston	39	23	.629	4.0	E.S. Farnsworth
Butte Miners	21	36	.368	10.5	John Barnes
Boise Irrigators / Bozeman Irrigators	16	41	.281	22.0	Con Strothers

Salt Lake City (34–17) moved to Livingston July 10; Boise (13–38) moved to Bozeman July 10; Butte disbanded July 18.
League disbanded July 25.

== See also ==
- Intermountain West
