= Salt Lake City Trappers =

- 1985–1992; Salt Lake City, Utah

Minor league affiliations
- Class: Rookie League
- League: Pioneer League

Major league affiliations
- Team: Unaffiliated

Minor league titles
- League titles (4): 1985; 1986; 1987; 1991
- Division titles (5): 1985; 1987; 1990; 1991; 1992

Team data
- Name: Salt Lake City Trappers
- Ballpark: Derks Field

The Salt Lake City Trappers were a Minor League Baseball team of the Rookie level Pioneer League from 1985 to 1992. They were located in Salt Lake City, Utah, and played their home games at Derks Field. The Trappers were not affiliated with any Major League Baseball team. They won the Pioneer League championship four times: in three consecutive seasons from 1985 to 1987, and again in 1991.

The Trappers' ownership group included Angels owner Arte Moreno, as well as actor Bill Murray and his brother Brian Doyle-Murray.

The team is best known for winning 29 consecutive games in 1987 to establish an all-time record for all of professional baseball. Memorabilia from the 1987 squad is on display at the Baseball Hall of Fame.

== Team history ==
In 1985, the Rookie Calgary Expos, an affiliate of the Montreal Expos, relocated from Calgary, Alberta, to Salt Lake City to make room for the Calgary Cannons of the Triple-A Pacific Coast League.

In 1993, the team relocated to Pocatello, Idaho, as the Pocatello Posse before moving to Ogden, Utah, as the Ogden Raptors in 1994.

== 1987 streak ==
During the 1987 Pioneer League season, the Trappers won 29 consecutive games to set a new professional baseball record that is still standing today. The previous record was 27 games, set by the Corsicana Oil Citys of the Texas League in 1902 and matched by the Baltimore Orioles of the International League in 1921. The Trappers went on to win the Pioneer League Championship, their third title in a row.

No players on the 1987 team went on to play in the major leagues, although outfielder Adam Casillas played 3 seasons in Triple-A. Pitcher John Savage has been the UCLA baseball head coach since 2005.

The team was the subject of the 2025 documentary The Streak, which won the Audience Award at the 2024 Nashville Film Festival.

== Season-by-season results ==
Season	W–L	Finish	Win%
1985	46–24	1st	.657
1986	45–25	1st	.643
1987	49–21	1st	.700
1988	41–29	2nd	.586
1989	33–36	2nd	.478
1990	42–26	2nd	.618
1991	49–21	1st	.700
1992	53–23	1st	.697
Total	358–205	—	.636
