= Ogden Dodgers =

- 1966–1974; Ogden, Utah

Minor league affiliations
- Class: Rookie
- League: Pioneer League

Major league affiliations
- Team: Co–op (1974); Los Angeles Dodgers (1966–1973)

Minor league titles
- League titles (4): 1966; 1967; 1968; 1969

Team data
- Name: Ogden Spikers (1974); Ogden Dodgers (1966–1973)

The Ogden Dodgers were a Minor League Baseball team based in Ogden, Utah. The Ogden Dodgers played as members of the Pioneer Baseball League from 1966 to 1973. The Ogden Dodgers were an affiliate of the Los Angeles Dodgers (1966–1973). Future Baseball Hall of Fame Manager Tommy Lasorda managed the team from 1966–1968.

== History ==
The Ogden Dodgers started in 1966 when the Pocatello Chiefs moved to Ogden and changed their name. They won the Pioneer League championship their first four seasons in existence from 1966 to 1969.

When the club lost its Dodgers affiliation after the 1973 season, they spent the 1974 season as the Ogden Spikers, a co-op team that featured players from six different Major League organizations.

After the 1974 season, the franchise moved to Canada and became the Lethbridge Expos.

== Notable alumni ==
- Tommy Lasorda (1966–1968, MGR) Inducted Baseball Hall of Fame, 1996
- Bill Buckner (1968) MLB All-Star; 1982 NL batting title
- Steve Garvey (1968) 10× MLB All-Star; 1974 NL Most Valuable Player
- Charlie Hough (1966) MLB All-Star
- Lee Lacy (1969)
- Tom Paciorek (1968) MLB All-Star
- Bill Russell (1966) 3× MLB All-Star
- Eddie Solomon (1969)
- Bobby Valentine (1968)
- Steve Yeager (1967) 1981 World Series Most Valuable Player
