= Ogden Raptors =

American minor-league professional baseball team

- Founded in 1994; Ogden, Utah

Team logo	Cap insignia

Minor league affiliations
- Class: Independent (from 2021)
- Previous classes: Rookie Advanced (1994–2020)
- League: Pioneer League (1994–present)

Major league affiliations
- Team: Independent (from 2021)
- Previous teams: Los Angeles Dodgers (2003–2020); Milwaukee Brewers (1996–2002); Independent (1994–1995)

Minor league titles
- League titles (2): 2017; 2023
- Division titles (11): 1996; 2005; 2010; 2011; 2012; 2014; 2016; 2017; 2018; 2019; 2023

Team data
- Name: Ogden Raptors (1994–present)
- Colors
- Mascot: Oggie
- Ballpark: Lindquist Field (1997–present)
- Previous parks: Serge B. Simmons Field (1994–1996)
- Owner/ Operator: Ogden Professional Baseball Inc.
- General manager: Trever Wilson
- Manager: Evan Parker
- Website: ogden-raptors.com

The Ogden Raptors are an independent baseball team of the Pioneer League, which is not affiliated with Major League Baseball (MLB) but is an MLB Partner League. They are located in Ogden, Utah and play their home games at Lindquist Field.

Pitcher Ben Sheets, first baseman Prince Fielder, shortstop J. J. Hardy and third baseman Bill Hall formerly played for the Raptors. Hall of Famer Frank Robinson played for the Ogden Reds, a previous Ogden franchise in the Pioneer League. The Raptors' inaugural 1994 season is chronicled in the book Minor Players, Major Dreams (1997, University of Nebraska Press) by author-in-uniform Brett Mandel.

During their second season of play the Raptors set a league record for most runs scored in a single game, defeating the Helena Brewers 33–10 on August 27, 1995.

The official mascot of the Ogden Raptors minor league baseball team is Oggie. Oggie is a cartoon green raptor who wears the white home uniform with a "#" as the number. He is a regular part of Raptors' home games and events.

Before they arrived in Ogden, the team was known as the Pocatello Posse and played in Pocatello, Idaho.

On September 17, 2017, the Raptors beat the Great Falls Voyagers 8–3 to win their first ever Pioneer League championship.

In conjunction with a contraction of Minor League Baseball in 2021, the Pioneer League, of which the Raptors have been members since 1994, was converted from an MLB-affiliated Rookie Advanced league to an independent baseball league and granted status as an MLB Partner League, with Ogden continuing as members.

== Playoffs ==
- 1996: Lost to Helena 2–0 in finals.
- 1998: Lost to Idaho Falls in semifinals.
- 2000: Lost to Idaho Falls 2–1 in semifinals.
- 2002: Lost to Provo 2–1 in semifinals.
- 2003: Lost to Provo 2–1 in semifinals.
- 2005: Lost to Orem 2–1 in semifinals.
- 2008: Lost to Orem 2–1 in semifinals.
- 2009: Lost to Orem 2–0 in semifinals.
- 2010: Defeated Orem 2–1 in semifinals; lost to Helena 2–0 in finals.
- 2011: Defeated Orem 2–1 in semifinals; lost to Great Falls 2–0 in finals.
- 2012: Defeated Grand Junction 2–1 in semifinals; lost to Missoula 2–1 in finals.
- 2014: Lost to Orem 2–1 in semifinals.
- 2016: Lost to Orem 2–1 in semifinals.
- 2017: Defeated Orem 2–0 in semifinals; defeated Great Falls 2–1 in finals.
- 2018: Lost to Grand Junction 2–1 in semifinals.
- 2019: Lost to Idaho Falls 2–1 in finals.
- 2021: Lost to Boise Hawks in Wild Card game.
- 2022: Lost to Grand Junction 2–1 in semifinals.
- 2023: Defeated Rocky Mountain 2–1 in semifinals; defeated Billings Mustangs 2–0 in finals.

== Major League alumni ==
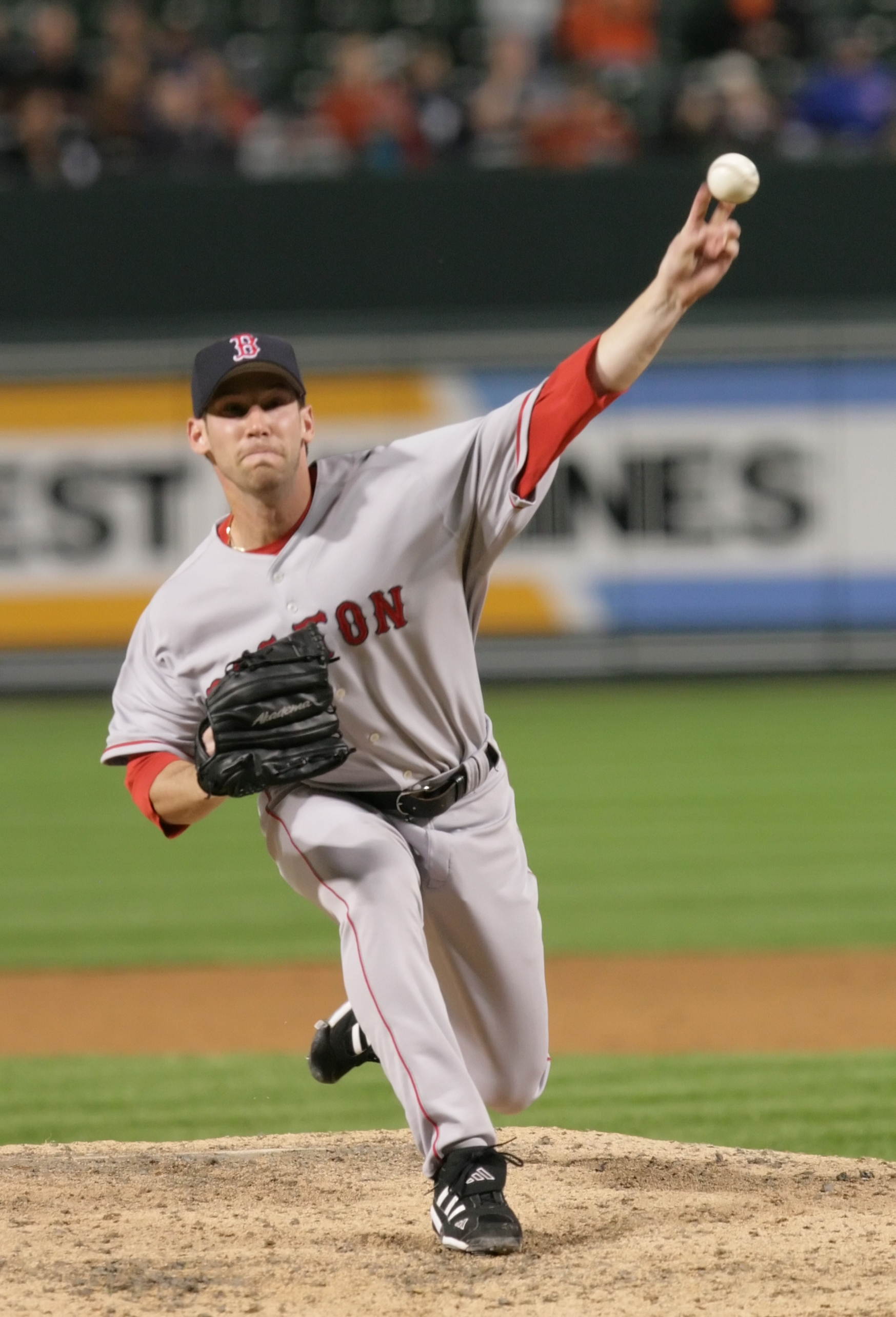
Craig Breslow

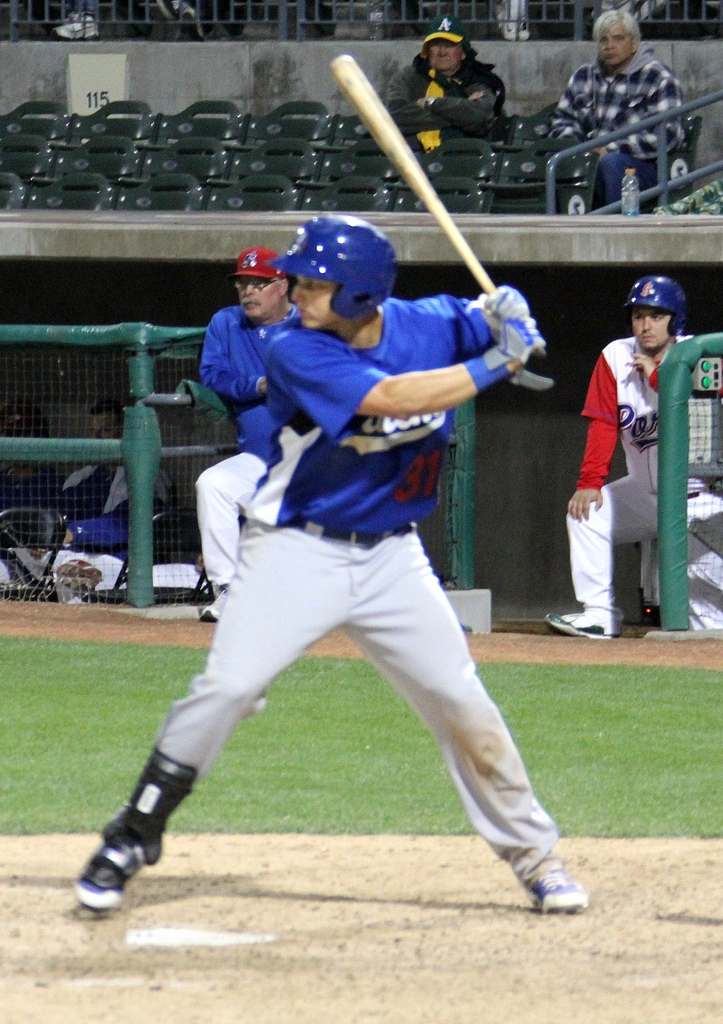
Joc Pederson

- Mike Adams
- Pedro Baez
- Larry Barnes
- Cody Bellinger
- Chad Billingsley
- Craig Breslow
- Willie Calhoun
- Marcos Carvajal
- Alejandro De Aza
- Blake DeWitt
- Jose Dominguez
- Scott Elbert
- Nathan Eovaldi
- Kyle Farmer
- Prince Fielder
- Yimi Garcia
- Dee Gordon
- Javy Guerra
- Bill Hall
- J. J. Hardy
- Corey Hart
- Ben Hendrickson
- Kenley Jansen
- Dean Kremer
- Dave Krynzel
- Russell Martin
- James McDonald
- Brad Nelson
- James Outman
- Manny Parra
- Xavier Paul
- Joc Pederson
- Justin Ruggiano
- Carlos Santana
- Corey Seager
- Ben Sheets
- Brock Stewart
- Ross Stripling
- Shawn Tolleson
- Scott Van Slyke
- Wesley Wright
- Alex Verdugo
- Edwin Rios

== Roster ==
Ogden Raptors roster
Active (25-man) roster	Coaching staff
Pitchers: 31 José Ballista; 28 Lucas Boesen; 54 Caleb Bunch; 17 Chase Chatman; 16 Micah Del Rio; 23 Christian Diaz; 97 Hunter Edwards; 6 Nolan Ficklin; 38 Dylan Gardner; 18 Miles Garrett; 35 Kaden Kneip; 37 Kyle Lewis; 28 Kade Linn; 14 Parker McMan; 28 Kalean Racculia; 33 Ryan Radkey; 31 Yordy Richard; 22 Landon Riley; 12 Nico Saltaformaggio; 99 Chance Wallace; Utility players: 15 Efrain Manzo; Catchers: 48 Hank Dodson; 26 Tyler Gilligan; 98 Eric Sim; Infielders: 44 Giuseppe Ferraro-Nahr; 47 Dylan Fesperman; 16 Sebastian Greico; 3 Cole Jordan; 9 Carmine Lane; 5 Chase Valentine; 21 Dylan Wilkinson; Outfielders: 30 Garrett Bevacqua; 13 Tyler Ganus; 36 Colson Lawrence; 8 Bradley Pelle; 10 Kyler Stancato	Manager: 34 Evan Parker; Coaches: 7 Ed Campaniello (hitting / bench); -- Chase Wells (assistant); Disabled list; ‡ Inactive list; § Suspended list; updated June 22, 2026 Transactions
