= Pocatello, Idaho minor league baseball teams =

American baseball teams

Pocatello minor league baseball teams
- 1900–1993; (1900, 1926–1928, 1939–1942, 1946–1965, 1984–1985, 1987–1991, 1993); Pocatello, Idaho

Minor league affiliations
- Previous classes: Rookie (1964–1965, 1984–1985, 1987–1991, 1993); Class A (1963); Class C (1926–1928, 1939–1942, 1946–1962)
- League: Pioneer League (1939–1942, 1946–1965, 1984–1985, 1987–1991, 1993)
- Previous leagues: Utah-Idaho Intermountain League (1900); Utah–Idaho League (1926–1928)

Major league affiliations
- Previous teams: San Francisco Giants (1987–1989); Oakland Athletics (1985); Los Angeles Dodgers (1964–1965); Chicago Cubs (1963); Boston Red Sox (1962); San Francisco Giants/Kansas City Athletics (1961); San Francisco Giants (1960); Kansas City Athletics (1956–1959); St. Louis Browns (1952–1953); St. Louis Cardinals (1939–1942, 1946–1951)

Minor league titles
- League titles (2): 1942; 1949

Team data
- Previous names: Pocatello Posse (1993); Pocatello Pioneers (1991); Gate City Pioneers (1990); Pocatello Giants (1987–1989); Pocatello Gems (1984–1985); Pocatello Chiefs (1962–1965); Pocatello Bannocks (1961); Pocatello Giants (1960); Pocatello A's (1957–1959); Pocatello Bannocks (1952–1956); Pocatello Cardinals (1939–1942, 1946–1951); Pocatello Bannocks (1926–1928); Pocatello Indians (1900)
- Previous parks: Halliwell Park

Pocatello, Idaho, has been home to minor league baseball teams who competed in 35 seasons of Minor League Baseball, between 1900 and 1993.

== History ==
The Pocatello Indians played as members of the Independent Utah-Idaho Intermountain League in 1900.

The Pocatello Bannocks played in the Utah–Idaho League from 1926 to 1928. Pocatello's teams since then have played in the Pioneer League. The Pocatello Cardinals, an affiliate of the St. Louis Cardinals, played during the seasons of 1939–1942 and 1946–1951, as the league paused for three years during World War II. The Cardinals won two Pioneer League titles in 1942 and 1949.

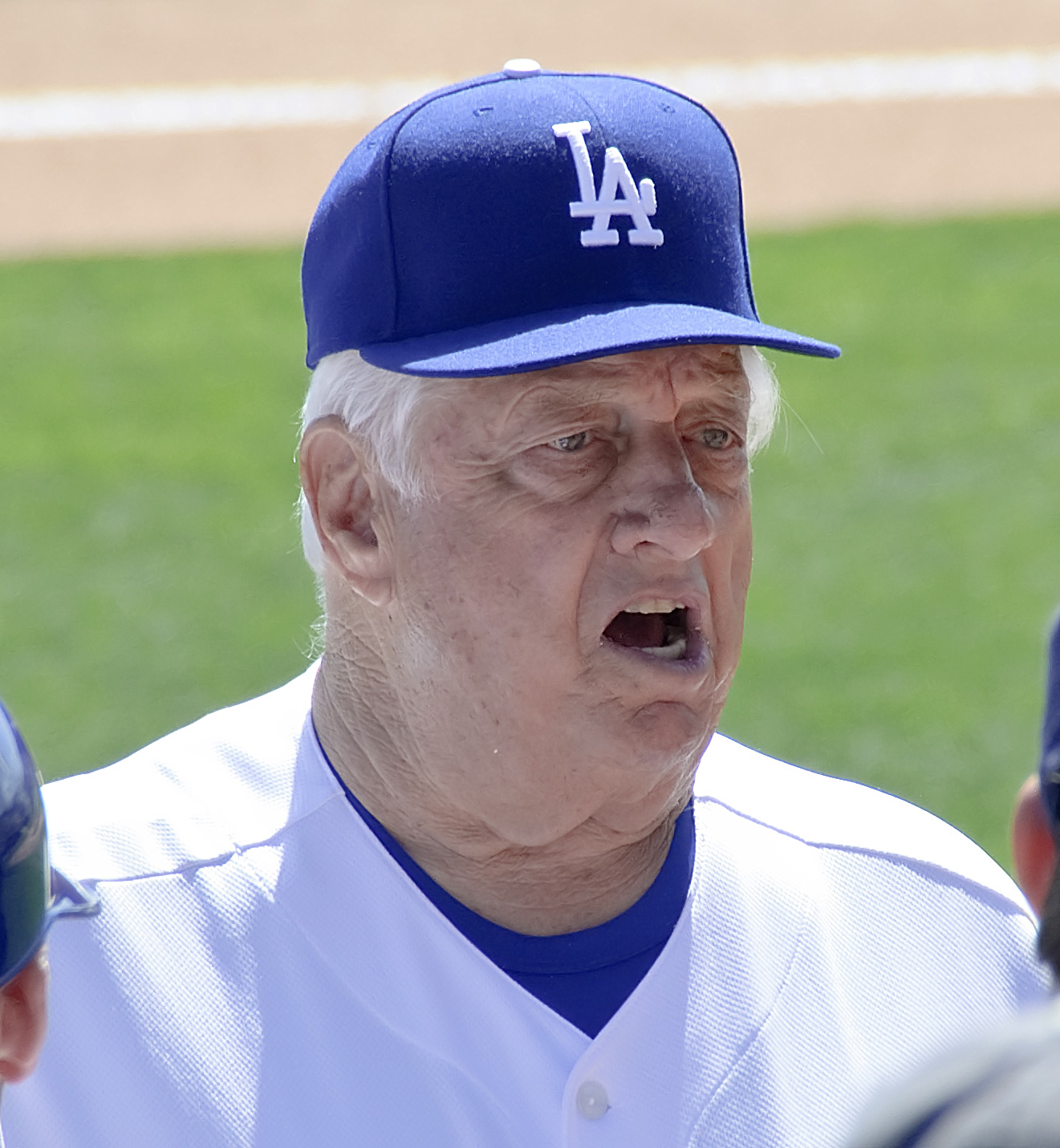
Hall of Fame Manager, Tommy Lasorda, 2010

A new version of the Pocatello Bannocks started in 1952, originally as a St. Louis Browns affiliate for the first two years. In 1957, they changed their name to the Pocatello A's to reflect their new connection to the Kansas City Athletics, and then in 1960 to the Pocatello Giants as the San Francisco Giants took over as their affiliate. After a final season as the Pocatello Bannocks in 1961, they changed their name to the Pocatello Chiefs in 1962 and remained under that name until they moved to Ogden, Utah, to become the Ogden Dodgers in 1966. Hall of Fame manager Tommy Lasorda managed the Chiefs in 1965.

In 1984, baseball returned to Pocatello for two seasons, when the Lethbridge Dodgers relocated as the Pocatello Gems. This was the same team that had left in 1966.

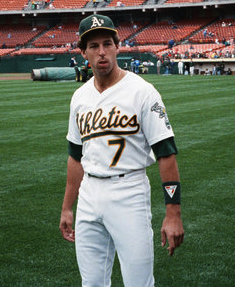
Walt Weiss, 1988 AL Rookie of the Year

The Pocatello Giants were affiliated with the San Francisco Giants for the 1988 and 1989 seasons; prior affiliation was with the Oakland A's. The home stadium was Halliwell Park, located on Alameda Drive. After the 1989 season the Giants ended their farm team affiliation with the franchise. The franchise became an independent/co-op team and was renamed the Gate City Pioneers for the 1990 season; that team featured players from the Montreal Expos and Chicago White Sox farm systems as well as minor league players from the Hiroshima Toyo Carp of the Nippon Professional Baseball. For the 1991 season, the team changed its name to the Pocatello Pioneers. The franchise to relocated to Lethbridge, Alberta, where they became the Lethbridge Mounties.

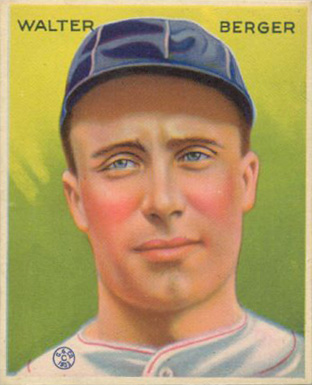
Wally Berger, 1933 Goudey card

Pocatello gained one more team in 1993, when the Salt Lake City Trappers - forced out by the move of a Class AAA Pacific Coast League team to the city - moved to town as the Pocatello Posse in 1993. After the 1993 season, the team moved to Ogden, Utah, to become the Ogden Raptors.

Semi-pro team

A new team, the Gate City Grays, was formed in 2014 as part of the Northern Utah League. They were undefeated in their first regular season and won the league championship the next two seasons. The Grays are a semi-professional team not associated with MLB. Games are played at Halliwell Park.

== Timeline ==
Year(s)	# Yrs.	Team	Level	League
1900	1	Pocatello Indians	Independent	Utah-Idaho Intermountain League
1926–1928	3	Pocatello Bannocks	Class C	Utah–Idaho League
1939–1942; 1946–1951	10	Pocatello Cardinals	Class C	Pioneer League
1952–1956	5	Pocatello Bannocks	Class C	Pioneer League
1957–1959	3	Pocatello A's	Class C	Pioneer League
1960	1	Pocatello Giants	Class C	Pioneer League
1961	1	Pocatello Bannocks	Class C	Pioneer League
1962–1965	4	Pocatello Chiefs	Class C (1962); Class A (1963); Rookie League	Pioneer League
1984–1985	2	Pocatello Gems	Rookie League	Pioneer League
1987–1989	3	Pocatello Giants	Rookie League	Pioneer League
1990	1	Gate City Pioneers	Rookie League	Pioneer League
1991	1	Pocatello Pioneers	Rookie League	Pioneer League
1993	1	Pocatello Posse	Rookie League	Pioneer League

== Notable alumni ==
- Tommy Lasorda (1965, MGR) Inducted Baseball Hall of Fame, 1997
- Corey Lidle (1993)
- Pat Rapp (1989)
- Jack Hiatt (1988, MGR)
- Rafael Landestoy (1987, MGR)
- Walt Weiss (1985) MLB All-Star; 1988 AL Rookie of the Year
- Greg Goossen (1964)
- Bill Sudakis (1964)
- Jim Strickland (1964–1965)
- John Boccabella (1963)
- Fred Wenz (1961–62)
- Mike McCormick (1960, MGR)
- Chico Salmon (1960)
- Tommy Giordano (1959, MGR) MLB Player; MLB Scout: Drafted Cal Ripken Jr.
- John O'Donoghue (1959) MLB All-Star
- Diego Segui (1959) 1970 AL ERA leader
- Dan Pfister (1958)
- Lou Klimchock (1958)
- Alex George (1958)
- Norm Bass (1958) 2-Sport Athlete: MLB (1961-63), Denver Broncos AFL (1964)
- Joe Lutz (1956)
- Lou Stringer (1956)
- Frank Lucchesi (1955)
- Hersh Martin (1953) MLB All-Star
- Willie Tasby (1952)
- Larry Jackson (1951) 5x MLB All-Star; 1964 NL Wins Leader
- Dick Rand (1950)
- John Romonosky (1950)
- Bob Mahoney (1948)
- Solly Hemus (1946)
- Bill Brenzel (1946)
- Nick Cullop (1942)
- Ed Chandler (1941)
- Bill DeLancey (1941, MGR)
- Eddie Malone (1939)
- Jim Mosolf (1928)
- Wally Berger (1927) 4x MLB All-Star; 1935 NL RBI Leader; 1935 NL HR Leader
- Woody Jensen (1927–28)
- Bruce Cunningham (1926)
- Doug Taitt (1926)
