= Salt Lake City Bees =

- (1911–1928, 1939–1942, 1946–1965, 1967–1984); Salt Lake City, Utah

Minor league affiliations
- Previous classes: Class-AAA (1958–1965, 1970–1984); Rookie-level (1967–1969); Class-C (1916–1928, 1939–1957); Class-AA (1915–1925); Class-D (1911–1914)
- Previous leagues: Pacific Coast League (1915–1925, 1958–1965, 1970–1984); Pioneer League (1939–1942, 1946–1957, 1967–1969); Utah–Idaho League (1926–1928); Union Association (1911–1914)

Major league affiliations
- Previous teams: Seattle Mariners (1982–1984); California Angels (1971–1981); San Diego Padres (1969–1970); San Francisco Giants (1967–1968); Chicago Cubs (1963–1965); Cleveland Indians (1961–1962); Pittsburgh Pirates (1958–1960); Philadelphia Phillies (1951–1957)

Minor league titles
- League titles: 6 (1928, 1946, 1953, 1959, 1971, 1979)

Team data
- Previous names: Salt Lake City Gulls (1975–1984); Salt Lake City Angels (1971–1974); Salt Lake City Giants (1967–1968); Salt Lake City Bees (1915–1928, 1939–1942, 1946–1965, 1969–1970); Salt Lake City Skyscrapers (1911–1914)
- Ballpark: Derks Field

The Salt Lake City Bees was a primary moniker of the minor league baseball teams, based in Salt Lake City, Utah between 1911 and 1970 under various names. After minor league baseball first began in Salt Lake City in 1900, the Bees were long-time members of both the Pacific Coast League and Pioneer League. The Salt Lake Bees played their home games at Derks Field.

== History ==
Salt Lake hosted two teams in the 1900 Independent Utah-Idaho Intermountain League, the Rio Grande Rios and Short Line Shorts. They were followed by the Salt Lake City White Wings in the 1901 Class D Inter-Mountain League, a team in the 1902 Utah State League and the Salt Lake City Elders (1903-1904)/Salt Lake Fruit Pickers (1905) of the Pacific National League. The 1909 Salt Lake City Mormons played in the Inter-Mountain League and the 1909 Salt Lake City Cubs played in the Montana State League

The direct predecessor to the Bees were the Salt Lake City Skyscrapers that played in the class-D Union Association from 1911–1914. The Association folded after the 1914 season. However, in 1915, the San Francisco Missions were sold to Utah businessman Bill "Hardpan" Lane who moved the team to Salt Lake City. The club was named the Bees from 1915–1925. Due to the high altitude and the dimensions of the club's Bonneville Park stadium, the Bees recorded some of the best batting records in the PCL during this period.

The club was named the Bees name from 1915–1925. However Lane moved the team to Los Angeles for the 1926 season. Originally they were known as the Hollywood Bees, but soon changed their name to the Hollywood Stars.

The Bees' baseball was still available though in the city with Salt Lake City's team in the Utah–Idaho League from 1926–1928. The team won its first title in their final 1928 season. In 1939 the third incarnation of the Bees was formed and played in the Pioneer League, winning titles in 1946 and 1953. The city returned to the Pacific Coast league from 1958–1965, winning the league title in 1959.

From 1967–1968, the city was represented by the Salt Lake City Giants, who again played in the Pioneer League, now a rookie-level class league. The team was affiliated with the San Francisco Giants The team played the 1969 and 1970 seasons renamed as the Bees.

After their 1969, the club returned to Triple-A status and the PCL. In 1971, the club was renamed the Salt Lake City Angels, when they became the affiliate of the California Angels through the 1974 season. In their first season as the Angels, the club won the southern division of the PCL with a 78-68 record. The team would then go on to defeat the Tacoma Twins 3 games to 1 to claim the league pennant. The team was renamed the Salt Lake City Gulls in 1975 but remained as the Angels' top affiliate through the 1981 season. In 1979, the team swept the Hawaii Islanders and captured their final league title.

In 1982, the Gulls switched to the Seattle Mariners organization. Following the 1984 season, the team was relocated to Calgary, Alberta, and became the Calgary Cannons in 1985.

When the PCL returned to Salt Lake City in 1994, the new team chose the name Salt Lake Buzz in part to pay homage to the Bees heritage. In November 2005, the Buzz—at that point the Salt Lake Stingers—changed their name to the Salt Lake Bees, reviving the name once again.

== Notable players ==
- Lefty Gomez (1928) Inducted, Baseball Hall of Fame
- Jeff Newman, MLB All-Star catcher and manager

== Year-by-year record ==
Salt Lake City Angels cap logo

Year	League	Record	Finish	Manager	Playoffs
Salt Lake City Skyscrapers
1911	Union Association	85-58	2nd	Cliff Blankenship	
1912	Union Association	77-61	2nd	Art Weaver	
1913	Union Association	75-47	2nd	John McCloskey	
1914	Union Association	52-34	2nd	Harry Hester	Lost Finals to Ogden Canners 4-2
Salt Lake City Bees I
1915	Pacific Coast League	108-89	2nd	Cliff Blankenship	
1916	Pacific Coast League	99-96	3rd	Cliff Blankenship	
1917	Pacific Coast League	102-97	3rd	Bill Bernhard	
1918	Pacific Coast League	48-49	5th	Walter McCredie	
1919	Pacific Coast League	88-83	3rd	Ed Herr	
1920	Pacific Coast League	95-92	5th	Ernie Johnson	
1921	Pacific Coast League	73-110	7th	Gavvy Cravath	
1922	Pacific Coast League	95-106	4th	Duffy Lewis	
1923	Pacific Coast League	94-105	5th	Duffy Lewis	
1924	Pacific Coast League	101-100	5th	Duffy Lewis	
1925	Pacific Coast League	116-84	2nd	Oscar Vitt	
Salt Lake City Bees II
1926	Utah–Idaho League	52-70	5th	Bud Orr / Bert Whaling / Chet Chadbourne	
1927	Utah–Idaho League	59-50	2nd	Harry O'Neill	
1928	Utah–Idaho League	68-49	1st	Bobby Coltrin	Won League Championship vs. Boise Senators, 4-1
Salt Lake City Bees III
1939	Pioneer League	59-65	4th	Eddie Mulligan	
1940	Pioneer League	79-51	1st	Tony Robello	Lost first round
1941	Pioneer League	68-60	3rd	Tony Robello	Lost first round
1942	Pioneer League	55-63	4th	Andy Harrington	
1946	Pioneer League	76-40	1st	Joe Orengo	League Champs
1947	Pioneer League	81-57	1st	Tommy Thompson	Lost League Finals
1948	Pioneer League	60-65	5th	Tommy Thompson	
1949	Pioneer League	73-53	4th	Tommy Thompson	Lost first round
1950	Pioneer League	55-70	6th	Earl Bolyard / Robert White	
1951	Pioneer League	84-52	1st	Hub Kittle	Lost first round
1952	Pioneer League	60-71	6th	Hub Kittle	
1953	Pioneer League	69-62	4th	Eddie Murphy / Burt Barkelew / Charlie Gassaway	League Champs
1954	Pioneer League	78-53	1st	Charlie Gassaway	Lost League Finals
1955	Pioneer League	61-70	6th	Bobby Sturgeon / Sven Jessen	
1956	Pioneer League	70-62	2nd (tie)	Frank Lucchesi	
1957	Pioneer League	61-64	5th	Cliff Dapper	
1958	Pacific Coast League	77-77	5th	Larry Shepard	
1959	Pacific Coast League	85-69	1st	Larry Shepard	Won Championship; No playoffs
1960	Pacific Coast League	80-73	3rd	Larry Shepard	
1961	Pacific Coast League	67-87	8th	Herman Franks/ Fred Fitzsimmons	
1962	Pacific Coast League	81-73	2nd	Bob Kennedy	
1963	Pacific Coast League	73-85	9th	El Tappe	
1964	Pacific Coast League	58-98	9th	Vedie Himsl	
1965	Pacific Coast League	56-91	10th	Stan Hack	
Salt Lake City Giants
1967	Pioneer League	25-41	4th	Harvey Koepf	
1968	Pioneer League	16-45	5th	Ray Malgradi	
Salt Lake City Bees IV
1969	Pioneer League	38-33	4th	Dave Garcia	
1970	Pacific Coast League	44-99	8th	Don Zimmer	
Salt Lake City Angels
1971	Pacific Coast League	78-68	2nd	Del Rice	Won Championship vs. Tacoma Twins, 3-1
1972	Pacific Coast League	80-68	3rd	Les Moss	
1973	Pacific Coast League	79-65	3rd	Les Moss	
1974	Pacific Coast League	69-73	5th	Norm Sherry	
Salt Lake City Gulls
1975	Pacific Coast League	80-64	2nd	Norm Sherry	Lost Championship vs. Hawaii Islanders, 4-2
1976	Pacific Coast League	90-54	1st	Jimy Williams	Lost Championship vs. Hawaii Islanders, 3-2
1977	Pacific Coast League	74-65	3rd	Jimy Williams	
1978	Pacific Coast League	72-65	5th	Deron Johnson	Lost Semifinals vs. Albuquerque Dukes, 3-0
1979	Pacific Coast League	80-68	2nd	Jimy Williams	Won Semifinals vs. Albuquerque Dukes, 2-0; Won Championship vs. Hawaii Islanders, 3-0
1980	Pacific Coast League	77-65	4th	Moose Stubing	
1981	Pacific Coast League	63-71	6th	Moose Stubing	
1982	Pacific Coast League	73-70	4th	Bobby Floyd	Lost Semifinals vs. Albuquerque Dukes, 2-0
1983	Pacific Coast League	67-75	7th	Bobby Floyd	
1984	Pacific Coast League	74-66	2nd	Bobby Floyd	Lost Semifinals vs. Edmonton Trappers, 3-2

== See also ==
- Salt Lake Bees – (includes Buzz, Stingers)
- Salt Lake City Trappers
