= Pioneer Baseball League =

Baseball league in the Western United States

Pioneer League
- Upcoming season or competition: 2026 Pioneer League season
- Classification: Independent league
- Sport: Baseball
- Founded: 1939 (87 years ago)
- President: Mike Shapiro
- Commissioner: Henry Hunter
- No. of teams: 10
- Country: United States
- Most recent champion: Billings Mustangs (2026)
- Most titles: Billings Mustangs (16)
- Website: pioneerleague.com

The Pioneer Baseball League (also known as simply the Pioneer League) is a professional baseball league based in the Western United States. It operates as one of four Major League Baseball (MLB) Partner Leagues in the American independent baseball league system without MLB team affiliations. The league is contested by 10 teams from California and the Rocky Mountains region, which each play a 96-game regular season split into two halves. The top two teams in each half qualify for a postseason tournament to determine the overall league champion.

The Pioneer League was established in 1939 as a Class C minor league consisting of six teams from Idaho and Utah. It later expanded to Montana as part of a failed effort in the 1950s to become a third major league rivalling the American and National leagues, complicated by competition with the Pacific Coast League. By the time it was reclassified as a Rookie league in 1964, only four teams in Idaho remained. Gradually, it returned to Montana and Utah, and expanded into Colorado and the Canadian province of Alberta by 1974, and since then has consistently had eight or more teams competing. In 2021, the league became independent and ceased all MLB team affiliations, reorganizing as an MLB Partner League representing the Western United States market. Though all the league's teams in Alberta and Colorado have since folded or relocated, an expansion into California in the 2020s balanced the number of teams.

As of the 2026 season, four teams from California and Montana each, two from Idaho, one from Utah, and one travel team, the RedPocket Mobiles, compete in the Pioneer League. Twenty franchises have competed in the league across its 87-year history, with the Missoula PaddleHeads, a current team that joined as the Pocatello Cardinals in the inaugural season, being the longest-tenured. The Billings Mustangs are the current champions and have won the most championships (16).

== History ==
The Pioneer League began in 1939 with six teams in Idaho and Utah, operating at the Class C level. The original six teams were the Boise Pilots, Lewiston Indians, Ogden Reds, Pocatello Cardinals, Salt Lake City Bees, and Twin Falls Cowboys. With players in short supply due to World War II, the league suspended operations for the 1943 through 1945 seasons.

In 1948, the league expanded by adding two teams in Montana; the Billings Mustangs and Great Falls Electrics. In these early years, teams in the league either operated independently or were affiliated with Major League Baseball (MLB) or Pacific Coast League (PCL) parent clubs, as the PCL was attempting to grow into a third major league (a bid that ultimately failed). When MLB's Los Angeles Dodgers displaced the PCL's Hollywood Stars in 1958, the Stars relocated and became the "new" Salt Lake City Bees, remaining in the PCL and taking away the Pioneer League's largest market.

By 1959, the Pioneer League was down to six teams; Billings and Great Falls along with the Boise Braves, Idaho Falls Russets, Missoula Timberjacks, and Pocatello Athletics. The league operated at the Class A level for one year (1963), before changing to Rookie league in 1964, when there were only four teams in the league; the Idaho Falls Angels, Magic Valley Cowboys, Pocatello Chiefs, and Treasure Valley Cubs. By 1978, the league had again grown to eight teams — Billings and Idaho Falls along with the Butte Copper Kings, Calgary Cardinals, Great Falls Giants, Helena Phillies, Lethbridge Dodgers, and Medicine Hat Blue Jays. With the exception of 1986 (when there were six teams), there have been at least eight teams in the league since then.

In 2016, total league attendance was 616,686, down slightly from the 2015 total of 633,622.

In its final years as an MLB-affiliated league, the Pioneer League was one of two "Rookie Advanced" minor leagues along with the Appalachian League. As such, it occupied the second-lowest rung in the minor league ladder. Although classified as a Rookie league, the level of play was slightly higher than that of the two "complex" Rookie leagues, the Gulf Coast League and Arizona League. Unlike the complex leagues, Pioneer League teams charged admission and sold concessions. It was almost exclusively the first fully professional league in which many players competed; most of the players had just been signed out of high school. It was a short-season league that competed from late June (when Major League teams signed players whom they selected in the amateur draft) to early September.

After the 2018 season, the Helena Brewers relocated to Colorado Springs, Colorado, where they became the Rocky Mountain Vibes.

As the start of the 2020 season was postponed due to the COVID-19 pandemic before being cancelled on June 30, making the 2019 season the league's last as an MLB-affiliated league of Minor League Baseball.

=== Independent league ===
In conjunction with the reorganization of Minor League Baseball in 2021, the Pioneer League was converted to an independent baseball league and was granted the status of an official MLB Partner League. The league continued as a rookie league to develop young players getting their first experience with professional baseball. Players are limited to those who have no more than two years of prior domestic or international professional baseball experience (not counting winter leagues such as the Australian Baseball League or the Caribbean Professional Baseball Confederation, the MLB Draft League, or MLB complex leagues) as of January 1 of a season's calendar year. Service time accrued during a period within four years of a player's high school graduation year does not count towards the two-year limit. A "year" of service time is counted as 30 or more games played in a season for position players, seven or more starts in a season for starting pitchers, or eighteen or more appearances for other pitchers. Each year, teams may designate one player as a "franchise" player for the upcoming season, who must have spent no less than two years in the PBL and played the prior season with the team choosing to tag them as a franchise player. Rosters can have a minimum of 22 and maximum of 24 active players (with the option to add a 25th player offered a contract at the conclusion of an official PBL tryout camp), with players on the inactive or injured lists not counting against the roster limits.

The reconfigured league continued with the same franchises using the same identities, with the exception of the Orem Owlz who relocated to Windsor, Colorado, as the Northern Colorado Owlz. The Boise Hawks also joined the Pioneer League in 2021 after moving from the Northwest League.

The Pioneer League announced a five-year naming rights deal between the league and ticket vendor TicketSmarter that would have the league branded The Pioneer Baseball League presented by TicketSmarter starting in time for the 2022 season.

On April 10, 2024, Kelsie Whitmore signed with the Oakland Ballers of the Pioneer League. She became the first woman to play for that league later that year. On June 6, 2024, she became the first female player to start a Pioneer League game. In that game she struck out one batter, gave up 6 hits, two earned runs, and a walk. The Ballers would lose the game by one run. On the same road trip, she gave up 11 earned runs in 4 and 2/3rds innings. The league further expanded into California for its 2026 season, adding teams in Long Beach and Modesto – the latter as a replacement for the Modesto Nuts of the California League, who moved to San Bernardino and became the Inland Empire 66ers. Simultaneously, the league's presence in Colorado came to an abrupt end, after both the Rocky Mountain Vibes and short-lived Colorado Springs Sky Sox folded, and the Grand Junction Jackalopes relocated.

== Teams ==
Locations of teams competing in the 2027 season

List of current teams
Team	Location	Stadium	Cap.	First
Billings Mustangs	Billings, Montana	Dehler Park	3,071	1948
Boise Hawks	Boise, Idaho	Memorial Stadium	3,452	2021 (Note: Previously played in the Northwest League from 1969 to 2020.)
Glacier Range Riders	Kalispell, Montana	Glacier Bank Park	2,500	2022
Great Falls Voyagers	Great Falls, Montana	Centene Stadium	4,000	1948
Idaho Falls Chukars	Idaho Falls, Idaho	Melaleuca Field	3,400	1940
Long Beach Coast	Long Beach, California	Blair Field	3,238	2026
Missoula PaddleHeads	Missoula, Montana	Ogren Park at Allegiance Field	5,000	1939
Oakland Ballers	Oakland, California	Raimondi Park	4,000	2024
Ogden Raptors	Ogden, Utah	Lindquist Field	8,700	1977
Orange County Baseball Club	Irvine, California	Great Park Baseball Stadium	1,200	2027

- **List of franchises (1939–present)**
- **Bold** text indicates current teams
- Boise Pilots / Boise Yankees / Boise Braves (1939–1963)
- Lewiston Indians (1939)
- Ogden Reds (1939–1955)
- Pocatello Cardinals / Pocatello Bannocks / Pocatello A's / Pocatello Giants / Pocatello Chiefs / Ogden Dodgers / Ogden Spikers / Lethbridge Expos / Lethbridge Dodgers / Pocatello Gems / Gate City Pioneers / Pocatello Pioneers / Lethbridge Mounties / Lethbridge Black Diamonds / Missoula Osprey / **Missoula PaddleHeads** (1939–present)
- Salt Lake City Bees / Salt Lake City Giants (1939–1957; 1967–1969)
- Twin Falls Cowboys / Magic Valley Cowboys (1939–1971)
- Idaho Falls Russets / Idaho Falls Yankees / Idaho Falls Angels / Idaho Falls A's / Idaho Falls Eagles / Idaho Falls Braves / Idaho Falls Gems / Idaho Falls Padres / **Idaho Falls Chukars** (1940–present)
- **Billings Mustangs** (1948–present)
- Great Falls Electrics / Great Falls Selectrics / Great Falls Dodgers / Great Falls Giants / Great Falls Dodgers / Great Falls White Sox / **Great Falls Voyagers** (1948–present)
- Missoula Timberjacks (1956–1960)
- Treasure Valley Cubs / Caldwell Cubs (1964–1971)
- Calgary Cardinals / Calgary Expos / Salt Lake City Trappers / Pocatello Posse / **Ogden Raptors** (1977–present)
- Medicine Hat A's / Medicine Hat Blue Jays / Helena Brewers / Rocky Mountain Vibes (1977–2025)
- Butte Copper Kings / Casper Rockies / Casper Ghosts / Grand Junction Rockies / Grand Junction Jackalopes (1978–2025)
- Helena Phillies / Helena Gold Sox / Helena Brewers / Provo Angels / Orem Owlz / Northern Colorado Owlz (1978–2025)
- **Boise Hawks** (2021–present)
- **Glacier Range Riders** (2022–present)
- **Oakland Ballers** (2024–present)
- Yolo High Wheelers / Yuba-Sutter High Wheelers / Yuba-Sutter Freebirds (2024–2026)
- Colorado Springs Sky Sox (2025)
- **Long Beach Coast** (2026–present)
- Modesto Roadsters (2026)
- RedPocket Mobiles (2026)

Timeline of franchises (1939–present)

== Champions ==
League champions have been determined by different means since the Pioneer League's formation in 1939. There were postseason playoffs when the league operated as Class C (1939–1962), except for 1939 and 1956, and for the three years during World War II when the league did not operate. In the league's one year as Class A (1963), there were also postseason playoffs. After becoming a Rookie league in 1964, the league champions were simply the regular season pennant winners through 1977. Since 1978, postseason playoffs have again been held to determine a league champion.

== See also ==
- List of Pioneer League owners
