= Smithfield (baseball) =

Smithfield "Blue Sox"
- 1921; Smithfield, Utah

Minor league affiliations
- Class: Class D (1921)
- League: Northern Utah League (1921)

Major league affiliations
- Team: None

Minor league titles
- League titles (0): None

Team data
- Name: Smithfield (1921)
- Ballpark: Richard V. Hansen

The Smithfield team was a minor league baseball team based in Smithfield, Utah. In 1921, the Smithfield team played as a charter member of the Class D level Northern Utah League. The team moniker was noted to be the "Blue Sox."

The Smithfield teams using the "Blue Sox" moniker, corresponds with local professional, semi–professional and collegiate summer baseball teams continually using the moniker, since Smithfield began hosting a baseball team in the 1890s.

== History ==
Smithfield became a charter member when the Northern Utah League first began play in the 1921 season. The Northern Utah League began the 1921 season as a six–team Class D level minor league. The Northern Utah League's charter franchises were based in Brigham City, Utah (Brigham City "Peaches"), Lewiston, Idaho (Lewiston Broncs), Logan, Utah (Logan Collegians), Ogden, Utah (Ogden) and Tremonton, Utah (Tremonton) joined Smithfield, in the newly formed league.

The 1921 Smithfield team using the "Blue Sox" moniker, corresponds with local semi–professional and collegiate summer baseball teams continually using the moniker every season since beginning play in the 1890s.

Smithfield began Northern Utah League began play on May 4, 1921, as the league played a split season schedule. The second half began on July 4, 1921. The six–team league overall standings in database references consisted of Brigham City (7–9), the Lewiston Broncs (4–11), Logan Collegians (8–9), Ogden (11–5), Smithfield (6–10) and Tremonton (12–4). With their 12–4 record, Tremonton had the best record in the league. It was reported that Tremonton finished 15–5 in the second half standings to again finish in first place in the standings.

Records conflict but reports in the "1921 Northern Utah League Summary" by Ray Olson, the league secretary, have Smithfield finishing in second place in the first half of the season and in fifth place in the second half. Olson's report has the Brigham City "Peaches" winning the first half with a 12–4 records and Smithfield in second place, 1.0 game behind with an 11–5 record. Reportedly, Tremonton won the second half, beating Ogden in a three–game playoff series after the two clubs finished the season tied for first place with 15–5 records. Smithfield was 8.0 games behind with a 7–13 record. In a five–game series for the league title, the Brigham City Peaches reportedly defeated the Tremonton "Bears" 3 games to 2. Smithfield's overall record as reported in the league summary was 18–18.

On June 11, 1921, Smithfield turned a triple play in a game against the Logan Collegians.

The Northern Utah League permanently folded as a minor league following the 1921 season. Smithfield, Utah has not hosted another minor league team.

== Richard V. Hansen Ballpark ==
The Richard V. Hansen Ballpark is located at Forrester Acres 500 W 100 N, Smithfield Utah. A statue of Richard Hansen can be seen on the East side of the park. Richard Hansen served as manager/coach of the Blue Sox for 47 years, and over 2,500 games. Hansen received multiple awards from his community for his service to the Blue Sox's and was inducted into the U.S. Open Baseball Hall of Fame. Hansen managed his 2,500th game on May 9, 2009, during Smithfield City Health Days. In 2009 he celebrated his 60th year with the team and 47 year as manager. In his 47 years of coaching the team, he only missed six games. Hansen died on January 21, 2010. In honor of his relentless and untiring service to the Smithfield Blue Sox the Richard V. Hansen Award has been awarded annually since 2010 to a person who has done all they could for the Blue Sox organization.

A memorial to Nyals Bodine, Steven Smith, and Dale Anderson can also be found on the East side of the park near the Blue Sox dugout.

In 2021 the crows nest was renamed the "Steven Smith Crows Nest" in memory of Steven Smith.

The ballpark has also become known for its "Lion Pups". Starting in 1953 instead of serving hot dogs the food stand decided to serve corn dogs. Ruth S. Hansen, an avid member of Lions Clubs International and mother of Richard Hansen said "We should call them Lion Pups." The name has stuck ever since. Originally a Lion Pup only cost 5 cents. They are traditional served with a secret sauce, many believe it to be a concoction of ketchup and mustard. The food stand, also known as the "Lions stand" and is sponsored by the Smithfield Lions Club.

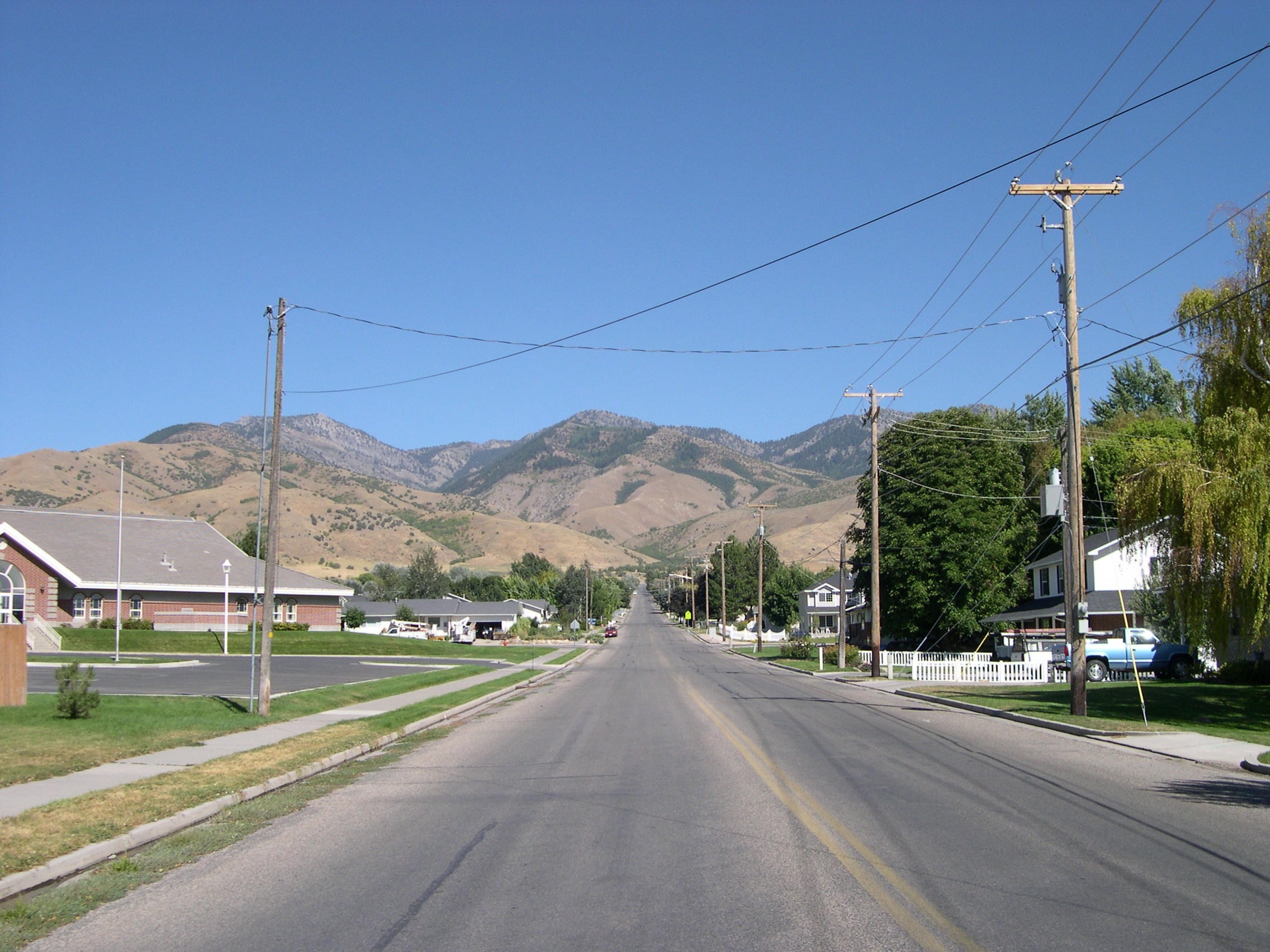
(2007) Smithfield, Utah

== Year–by–year records ==
Year	Wins	Losses	Finish	Manager	Playoffs/Notes
1921	6	10*	4th	NA	"League summary" has team at 18–18
1980	40	16			
1979	46	18			
1978	40	22			
1977	46	13			
1976	45	11			
1975	41	16			
1974	32	13			
1973	35	11			
1972	31	13			
1971	39	16			
1970	31	11			
1969	37	17			
1968	24	17			
1967	30	15			
1966	38	5			
1965	24	14			
1964	18	16			
1963	25	11			
1962	22	12			
1961	31	7			
1960	25	11			

== Notable alumni ==
- Robert Thomas Kaiser: Played 5 games with the Cleveland Indians in their 1971 season. He went on to play for the Blue Sox in 1974.
- Lewis Albert Fonseca: Played for the Smithfield Summits in 1920. He went straight to the major leagues playing with the Cincinnati Reds (1921-1924), the Phillies (1925), the Cleveland Indians (1927-1931), and the Chicago White Sox (1931-1933). Fonseca also won the American League Batting Title in 1929.
