= Idaho Falls Spuds =

- 1926–1928; Idaho Falls, Idaho

Minor league affiliations
- Class: Class C (1926–1928)
- League: Utah-Idaho League (1926–1928)

Major league affiliations
- Team: None

Minor league titles
- League titles (2): 1926; 1927
- Wild card berths (1): 1927

Team data
- Name: Idaho Falls Spuds (1926–1928)
- Ballpark: Highland Park (1926–1928)

The Idaho Falls Spuds were the first minor league baseball team based in Idaho Falls, Idaho. Playing from 1926 to 1928, the Spuds played as members of the Class C level Utah-Idaho League, winning league championships in 1926 and 1927 and hosting home games at Highland Park.

The Idaho Falls Spuds were followed by the Idaho Falls Russets, who joined the Pioneer League in 1940. Today, the Idaho Falls Chukars franchise continues play in the Pioneer League.

== History ==
Minor League baseball began in Idaho Falls in 1926, when the Idaho Falls Spuds became charter members of the newly formed Utah-Idaho League. The Idaho Falls Spuds joined the Logan Collegians, Ogden Gunners, Pocatello Bannocks, Salt Lake City Bees and Twin Falls Bruins in the new six–team league.

The 1926 Idaho Falls Spuds won the 1926 Utah–Idaho League Championship. The Spuds ended the season with a 75–39 record, finishing 11.5 games ahead of the 2nd place Twin Falls Bruins. Idaho Falls was managed by Bill Leard and Danny Collins. The league did not have playoffs in 1926. Idaho Falls pitcher Robert Hurst led the league with 22 wins, while teammate Guy Morrison had a 2.83 ERA to lead the league.

In 1927, the Spuds repeated as Utah-Idaho League Champions. On June 28, 1927, Idaho Falls pitcher Charles Newbill pitched a no–hitter in a 4–0 win against the Twin Falls Bruins. The Spuds finished the season with a record of 52–47 to place 3rd in the Utah-Idaho League regular season standings, playing under manager Dan O'Leary. In the 1927 Utah-Idaho League Playoffs, the Idaho Falls Spuds defeated the Pocatello Bannocks 4 games to 3 to claim their second consecutive Utah–Idaho League Championship.

In 1928, the Idaho Falls Spuds were playing under manager Pete Maloney, with a record of 17–38, when the franchise disbanded on July 5, 1928. The Twin Falls Bruins franchise folded on the same day. The Utah–Idaho League finished the 1928 season with the four remaining teams, but folded permanently after the season.

Idaho Falls minor league baseball resumed in 1940, when the Idaho Falls Russets became a member franchise of the Pioneer League, a league still playing as a Rookie League today with the Idaho Falls Chukars as a member.

== The ballpark ==
The Idaho Falls Spuds minor league teams played home games at Highland Park. The ballpark sat within Highland Park. All Idaho Falls teams since have played in ballparks at the same site. The Highland Park ballpark had a capacity of 3,000 (1927), with dimensions (Left, Center, Right) of 350–400–350 (1927). The Highland Park ballpark was located at 500 West Elva, Idaho Falls, Idaho.

Today, Highland Park contains Melaleuca Field, which hosts the Idaho Falls Chukars of the Pioneer League. Melaleuca Field is located at 568 West Elva, Idaho Falls, Idaho.

== Timeline ==
Year(s)	# Yrs.	Team	Level	League
1926–1928	3	Idaho Falls Spuds	Class C	Utah-Idaho League

== Year-by-year records ==
Year	Record	Finish	Manager	Playoffs/notes
1926	75–39	1st	Bill Leard / Danny Collins	League champions
1927	52–47	3rd	Dan O'Leary	defeated Pocatello Bannocks 4–3; League champions
1928	17–38	6th	Pete Maloney	Team disbanded July 5

== Notable alumni ==
- Bill Brenzel (1928)
- Ed Coleman (1927)
- Jim Cronin (1926–1927)
- Ike Danning (1926)
- Roy Johnson (1926)
- Guy Morrison (1926)

== See also ==
Idaho Falls Spuds players
