= Idaho Falls Chukars =

American minor-league professional baseball team

- Founded in 1940; Idaho Falls, Idaho
Team logo
Cap insignia

Minor league affiliations
- Class: Independent (from 2021)
- Previous classes: Rookie Advanced (1964–2020); Class A (1963); Class C (1940–1942, 1946–1962)
- League: Pioneer League (1940–1942, 1946–present)

Major league affiliations
- Team: Independent (from 2021)
- Previous teams: Kansas City Royals (2004–2020); San Diego Padres (1995–2003); Atlanta Braves (1986–1994); Oakland Athletics (1982–1984); California Angels (1966–1981); New York Yankees (1962–1965); Chicago White Sox (1960–1961); Pittsburgh Pirates (1959); Detroit Tigers (1954–1958); Sacramento Solons (PCL) (1953–1954); New York Giants (1949–1951); Brooklyn Dodgers (1948); New York Yankees (1940–1941)

Minor league titles
- League titles (8): 1952; 1963; 1970; 1974; 1998; 2000; 2013; 2019
- Division titles (8): 1978; 1982; 1998; 2000; 2006; 2007; 2013; 2019

Team data
- Name: Idaho Falls Chukars (2004–present)
- Previous names: Idaho Falls Padres (2000–2003); Idaho Falls Braves (1993–1999); Idaho Falls Gems (1992); Idaho Falls Braves (1986–1991); Idaho Falls Eagles (1985); Idaho Falls A's (1982–1984); Idaho Falls Angels (1966–1981); Idaho Falls Yankees (1962–1965); Idaho Falls Russets (1940–1942, 1946–1961)
- Colors: Burgundy, silver, black
- Mascot: Charlie the Chukar
- Ballpark: Melaleuca Field (2007–present)
- Previous parks: McDermott Field (1978–2006)
- Owner/ Operator: Elmore Sports Group
- General manager: Kevin Greene
- Manager: Les Lancaster
- Website: ifchukars.com

The Idaho Falls Chukars are an independent baseball team of the Pioneer League, which is not affiliated with Major League Baseball (MLB) but is an MLB Partner League. They are located in Idaho Falls, Idaho, and play their home games at Melaleuca Field.

They adopted the name the Chukars following a fan vote when the major league affiliation changed after the 2003 season. A chukar is a game bird found in the region. The Chukars are not the only professional sports team in Eastern Idaho (see Spud Kings).

In conjunction with a contraction of Minor League Baseball in 2021, the Pioneer League, of which the Chukars have been members since 1940, was converted from an MLB-affiliated Rookie Advanced league to an independent baseball league and granted status as an MLB Partner League, with Idaho Falls continuing as members.

== Franchise history ==
After fielding the Idaho Falls Spuds in the Utah–Idaho League from 1926 to 1928, the franchise restarted in 1940 and were called the Russets, playing in the Pioneer League. The team has played each season since then, under various major league affiliations and nicknames, except for three years that the Pioneer League suspended operation due to World War II. It has played in its present city without interruption longer than any team in the league. Only the Missoula PaddleHeads, descendants of a charter Pioneer League franchise, the Pocatello Cardinals, have been in the league longer.

For much of their history as an affiliated minor league team, the Chukars and their predecessors were many players' first experience with fully professional baseball. As such, a number of notable baseball players saw time in Idaho Falls during their careers. Among the more famous baseball alumni of Idaho Falls teams are Billy Martin, Joe Maddon, Jose Canseco, Mike Moustakas, Eric Hosmer and Billy Butler. The Chukars are the only professional sports team in Eastern Idaho. More than one million fans have attended Idaho Falls home games since the team moved into Melaleuca Field in 2007.

== Roster ==
Idaho Falls Chukars roster
Active (25-man) roster	Coaching staff
Pitchers: 46 Griffin Bremer; 51 Damon Ellis; 13 Alex Fishberg; 47 Nick Floyd; 27 Matt Geoffrion; 50 Nate Jenkins; 12 Alex Leija; 38 Keagan McGinnis; 24 Jon Nunnally; 48 Victor Rodriguez; 35 Daniel Silva; 31 Joe Slocum; 9 Jake Waters; Catchers: 33 Hunter Hisky; 30 Brady West; Infielders: 23 Steve Barmakian; 20 Andrew Don; 7 Tyler Kelly; 21 Webb Little; 4 Tyler Van Marter; 15 Tyler Wyatt; Outfielders: 29 Hogan Brown; 11 Thomas DeBonville; 36 Calvin Estrada; 17 Matt Feinstein; 25 Kona Quiggle	Manager: -- Les Lancaster; Coaches: -- Bob Milacki (pitching); Disabled list; ‡ Inactive list; § Suspended list; Roster updated April 18, 2024 Transactions

== Broadcasting ==
All exhibition, regular season and postseason games can be heard on KSPZ (Fox Sports Radio affiliate) 980 AM - 98.7 FM throughout Eastern Idaho in Idaho Falls and Pocatello. The signal also reaches part of Western Wyoming. John Balginy has been the "Voice of the Chukars" since 1985. For 2023, Ben Pokorny is the Director of Broadcasting & Media Relations, serving as the solo play-by-play voice for all road games and working in the booth with Balginy for all home games.

== Notable alumni ==
Numerous Idaho Falls alumni advanced to Major League baseball, some alumni of note include:

- Raul Mondesi (2012)
- Danny Duffy (2010)
- Wil Myers (2009) MLB All-Star; 2013 AL Rookie of the Year
- Eric Hosmer (2008) 4 × GG; MLB All-Star
- Salvador Pérez (2008–09) 5 × GG; 9 × MLB All-Star; 2015 World Series MVP
- Greg Holland (2007) 3 × MLB All-Star; 2014 AL Reliever of the Year
- Mike Moustakas (2007) 3 × MLB All-Star
- Billy Butler (2004) MLB All-Star
- Carlos Lezcano (2003, MGR)
- José Lobatón (2003)
- Óliver Pérez (2000)
- Jake Peavy (1999) 3 × MLB All-Star; 2007 NL wins Leader; 2× MLB ERA leader (2004, 2007); 2007 NL Cy Young Award
- Rick Sutcliffe (Pitching coach: 1996-1997) 3 x MLB All-Star, 1984 NL Cy Young Award, 1979 NL Rookie of the Year, ESPN Broadcaster
- Shawn Camp (1997)
- Matt Clement (1995) MLB All-Star
- Ben Davis (1995)
- Dave Hilton (1992, MGR)
- Cloyd Boyer (1989, MGR)
- Kevin Brown (1986) 6 × MLB All-Star; 2 × NL ERA Leader (1996, 2000)
- Rod Gilbreath (1986–87, MGR)
- Al Martin (1986)
- Jim Nettles (1984 MGR)
- Félix José (1984) MLB AS
- Jose Canseco (1982) 6 × MLB All-Star; 2 × MLB home run leader (1988, 1991); 1986 AL Rookie of the Year; 1988 AL Most Valuable Player
- Dick Schofield (1981)
- Devon White (1981) 7 × GG; 3 × MLB All-Star
- Joe Maddon (1981, MGR) 3 × MLB Manager of the Year (2008, 2011, 2015); MGR: 2016 World Series Champion — Chicago Cubs
- Gary Pettis (1979) 5 × GG
- Tom Brunansky (1978) MLB All-Star
- Mike Witt (1978) 2 × MLB All-Star; Perfect Game: 9/30/1984
- Richard Dotson (1977) MLB All-Star
- Keith Comstock (1976)
- Bobby Clark (1975)
- Mark Clear (1975) 2 × MLB All-Star
- Carney Lansford (1975) MLB All-Star; 1981 AL Batting Title
- Thad Bosley (1974)
- Julio Cruz (1974)
- Larry Himes (1974–77, MGR)
- Rance Mulliniks (1974)
- Dave Collins (1972)
- Ron Jackson (1971)
- Dan Briggs (1970–71)
- Dick Lange (1970)
- Sid Monge (1970) MLB AS
- Morris Nettles (1970)
- Rudy Meoli (1969)
- Norm Sherry (1969, MGR)
- Lloyd Allen (1968)
- Doug Griffin (1965)
- Tom Egan (1964)
- Marty Perez (1964–65)
- Frank Fernández (1963)
- Steve Whitaker (1962–63)
- Jim Shellenback (1962)
- Tommy McCraw (1961)
- Jerry McNertney (1961)
- Bob Locker (1960)
- Jim Hicks (1960–61)
- Peanuts Lowrey (1960, MGR) MLB All-Star
- Fred Talbot (1960)
- Donn Clendenon (1959) 1969 World Series MVP
- Jim Campbell (1959)
- Jake Wood (1958)
- Buck Rodgers (1958) MLB Player; MLB MGR; 1987 NL Manager of the Year
- Bob Johnson (1956)
- Charlie Metro (1956, MGR)
- Ken Rowe (1955)
- Pat Mullin (1955, Player/MGR) 2 × MLB AS;
- Bubba Morton (1955)
- Cuno Barragan (1953) Inducted Mexican American Hall of Fame
- John Briggs (1952–53)
- Billy Martin (1946) MLB All-Star; MGR: 1977 World Series Champion—New York Yankees
- Bill Wight (1941)
- Clancy Smyres (1941) MLB autograph is more valuable than Babe Ruth
- Elmer Singleton (1941)
- Doc Marshall (1941)
- Woody Main (1941)
- Ed Bahr (1940)
- Ed Coleman (1927)
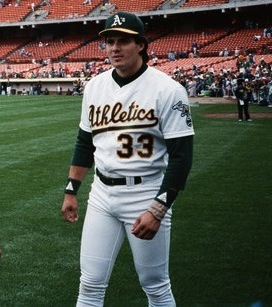
Jose Canseco 1989

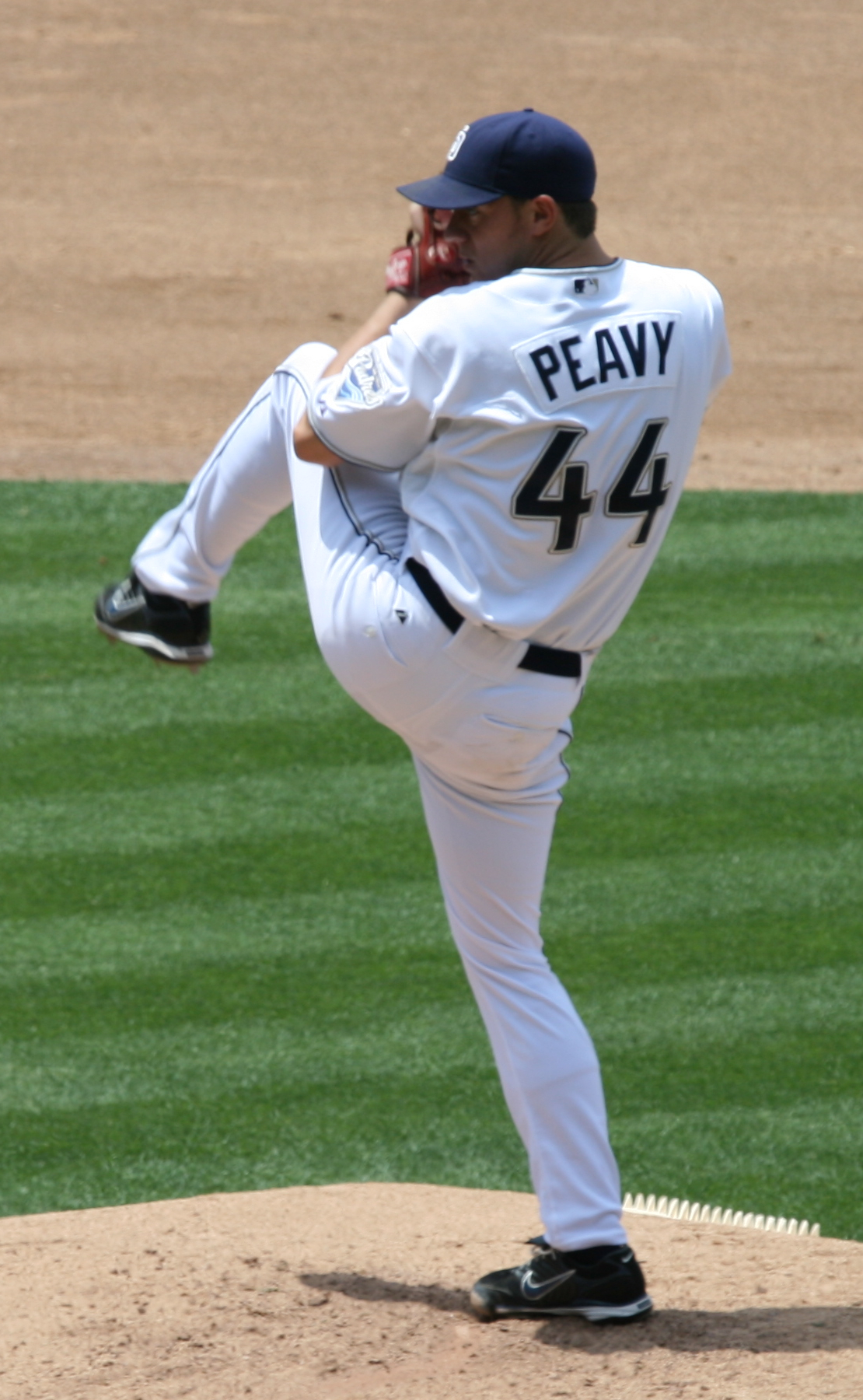
Jake Peavy, 2007

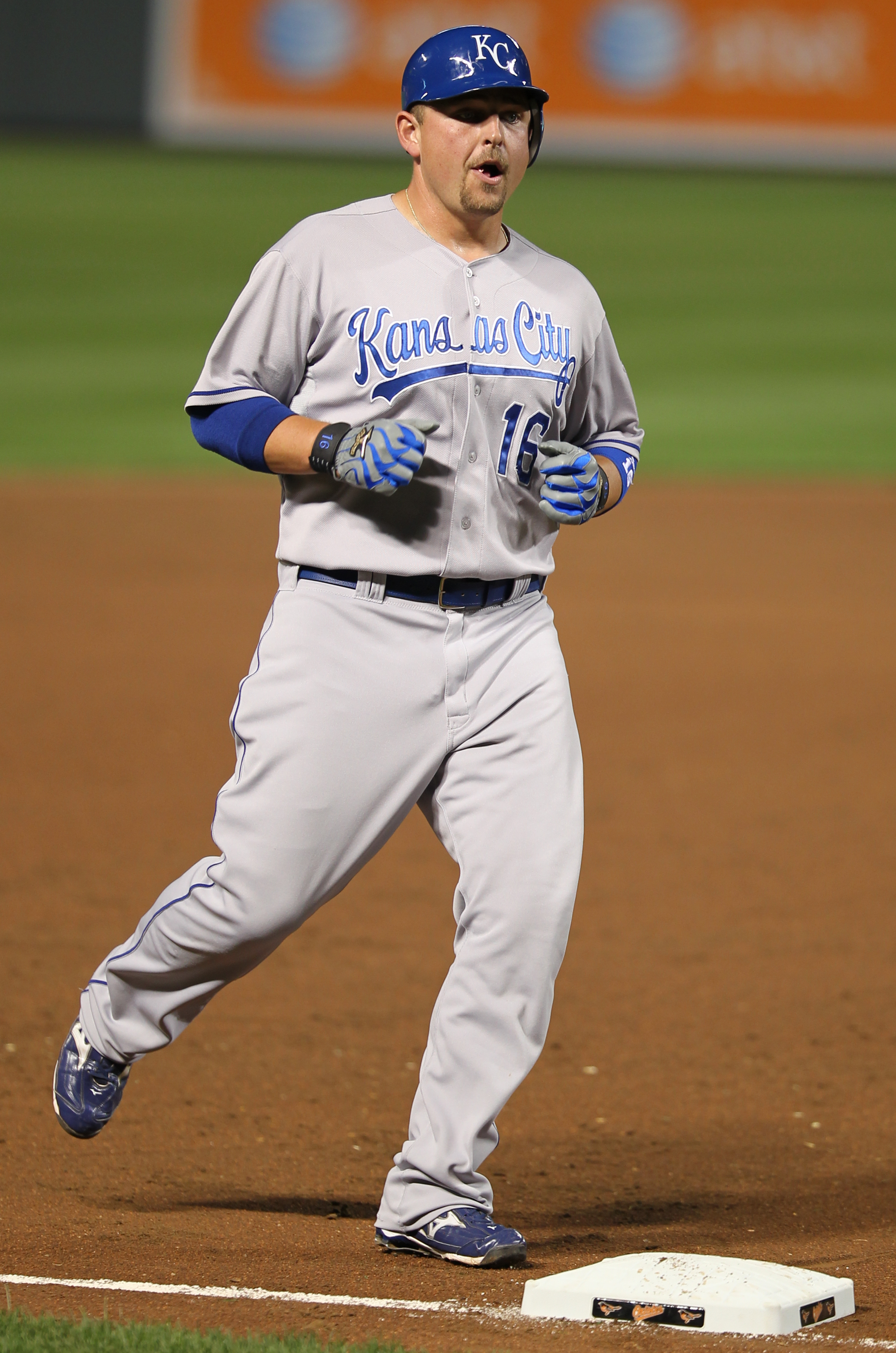
Kansas City Royals Billy Butler, 2011

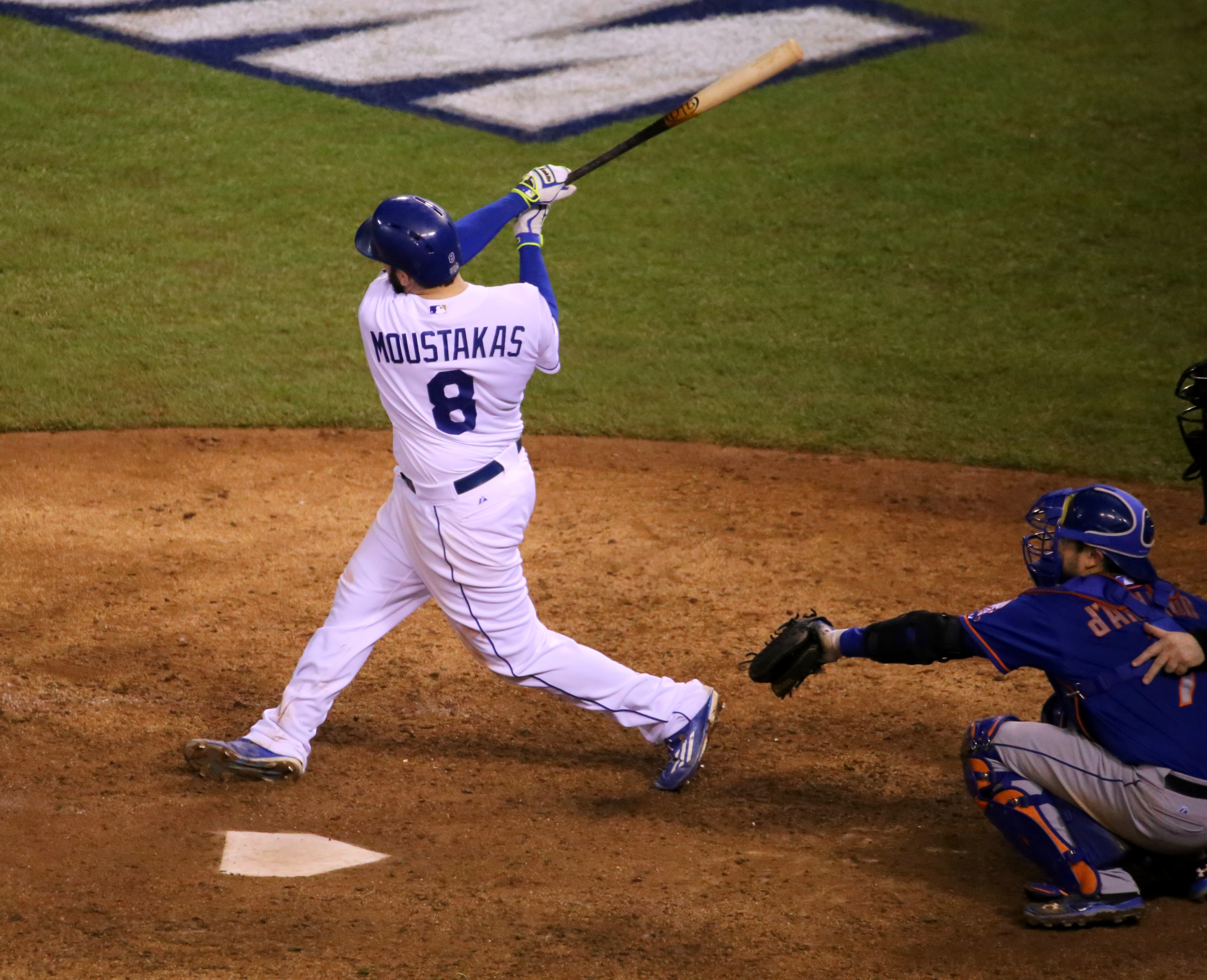
Mike Moustakas, Game 1, 2015 World Series
