= Twin Falls Bruins =

- 1926–1928; Twin Falls, Idaho

Minor league affiliations
- Class: Class C (1926–1928)
- League: Utah-Idaho League (1926–1928)

Major league affiliations
- Team: None

Minor league titles
- League titles (0): None

Team data
- Name: Twin Falls Bruins (1926–1928)
- Ballpark: Athletic Park (1926–1928)

The Twin Falls Bruins were the first minor league baseball team based in Twin Falls, Idaho. From 1926 to 1928, the Twin Falls Bruins played exclusively as members the Class C level Utah-Idaho League, hosting home games at Athletic Park.

The Bruins were succeeded in Twin Falls by the Twin Falls Cowboys, who joined the Pioneer League in 1939.

== History ==
Twin Falls first hosted the semi–pro "Twin Falls Irrigators", who began play in 1905, playing against other regional teams for many seasons.

In 1926, minor League baseball began in Twin Falls, when the Twin Falls "Bruins" became charter members of the Class C level Utah-Idaho League. The Bruins joined the Idaho Falls Spuds, Logan Collegians, Ogden Gunners, Pocatello Bannocks and Salt Lake City Bees teams in the new six–team league.

In their first season of play, the 1926 Twin Falls Bruins ended the season with a record of 63–50, playing the season under manager Carl Zamloch. The Bruins placed second in the regular season standings, finishing 11.5 games behind the champion Idaho Falls Spuds. The Utah-Idaho League did not have playoffs in 1926.

In 1927, the Bruins continued league play and placed sixth and last in the Utah-Idaho League. Twin Falls ended the season with a record of 40–63, playing under managers Curly Gardiner, Phil Apperson and Bill Leard. Twin Falls finished the season 18.0 games behind the first place Ogden Gunners and did not qualify for the playoffs that were held.

After continuing play, the Twin Falls Bruins folded during the 1928 season. On July 5, 1928, the Bruins had compiled a record of 29–29 playing under manager Bill Leard when the franchise disbanded. Fellow Utah-Idaho League member Idaho Falls Spuds disbanded on the same day. The Utah-Idaho League finished the season with four teams and permanently folded after conclusion of the 1928 season.

After a decade hiatus, minor league baseball returned to Twin Falls in 1939, when the Twin Falls Cowboys became charter members of the six–team Pioneer League and began a tenure of play in the league.

== The ballpark ==
The Twin Falls Bruins hosted home minor league home games at the Twin Falls Athletic Park. Baseball Hall of Fame inductee Ty Cobb had a brother who lived in Twin Falls. Cobb hosted an exhibition game at Twin Falls Athletic Park on Nov. 9, 1915, between a group of American League All-Stars and a team from the National League. Torn down in 1974, Twin Falls Athletic Park was located on the 500 block of Second Avenue South in Twin Falls, Idaho.

== Timeline ==
Year(s)	# Yrs.	Team	Level	League	Ballpark
1926–1928	3	Twin Falls Bruins	Class C	Utah-Idaho League	Twin Falls Athletic Park

== Year–by–year records ==
Year	Record	Finish	Manager	Playoffs/Notes
1926	63–50	2nd	Carl Zamloch	No playoffs held
1927	40–63	6th	Curly Gardiner / Phil Apperson / Bill Leard	Did not qualify
1928	29–29	NA	Bill Leard	Team folded July 5

== Notable alumni ==
- Bill Brenzel (1927)
- Ed Coleman (1928)
- Pete Daglia (1926)
- Myril Hoag (1927) MLB All-Star
- Lou Rosenberg (1926–1927)
- Carl Zamloch (1926, MGR)

== See also ==
- Twin Falls Bruins players
