= Logan Collegians =

Minor league baseball team in Utah

- 1902–1927; (1902, 1921, 1926–1927); Logan, Utah

Minor league affiliations
- Class: Independent (1902); Class D (1921); Class C (1926–1927)
- League: Utah State League (1902); Northern Utah League (1921); Utah-Idaho League (1926–1927)

Major league affiliations
- Team: None

Minor league titles
- League titles (0): None

Team data
- Name: Logan (1902); Logan Collegians (1921, 1926–1928)
- Ballpark: Crimson Field (1926–1927)

The Logan Collegians were a minor league baseball team based in Logan, Utah. Between 1902 and 1927, Logan teams played as members of the 1902 Utah State League, 1921 Class D level Northern Utah League and Class C level Utah-Idaho League in 1926 and 1927.

== History ==
Minor League baseball began in Logan in 1902, when the Logan team played as members of the four–team Independent level Utah State League. Logan played the season under manager Harry Stovey. The 1902 Utah State League final standings are unknown. The Utah State League disbanded following the 1902 season.

In 1921, the Logan "Collegians" became charter members of the Class D level Northern Utah League. The Northern Utah League began play as a six–team league and Logan played with hosting franchises from Brigham City, Utah (Brigham City Peaches), Lewiston, Idaho (Lewiston Broncs), Ogden, Utah (Ogden), Smithfield, Utah (Smithfield Blue Sox) and Tremonton, Utah (Tremonton Bears).

The Logan Collegians finished the 1921 season with a record of 8–9, placing 4th in the six–team Northern Utah League. Playing under manager Lewis Edwards, The Collegians Logan finished 5.5 games behind the 1st place Tremonton team. The Northern Utah League folded as a minor league after the 1921 season.

The Logan use of the "Collegians" moniker corresponds to Logan, Utah being home to Utah State University, founded in 1888.

In 1926, the Logan Collegians became charter members of the Class C level Utah-Idaho League. The Collegians joined the Idaho Falls Spuds, Ogden Gunners, Pocatello Bannocks, Salt Lake City Bees and Twin Falls Bruins, playing in the new six–team league.

The 1926 Collegians placed 4th in the first year of the Utah–Idaho League. Logan ended the 1926 season with a record of 48–65, finishing 26.5 games behind the 1st place Idaho Falls Spuds, playing under managers Harry Wolter, Nick Williams and Nate Shandling. The Logan Collegians began play at Crimson Field.

In their final season of minor league play, the Logan Collegians ended the 1927 Utah–Idaho League season in 4th place. With a 49–51 record, the Collegians finished 7.5 games behind the champion Ogden Gunners. Harry Wolter served as player/manager in 1927. The Logan franchise folded after the 1927 season and was replaced in the 1928 Utah–Idaho League season by the Boise Senators.

Logan, Utah has not hosted another minor league team.

== The ballpark ==
The Logan Collegians were noted to have played minor league home games at Crimson Field beginning in 1926. Crimson Field had a capacity of 2,500. Today, Crimson Field is still in use as home to Logan High School sports teams. The address is 162 West 100 South, Logan, Utah.

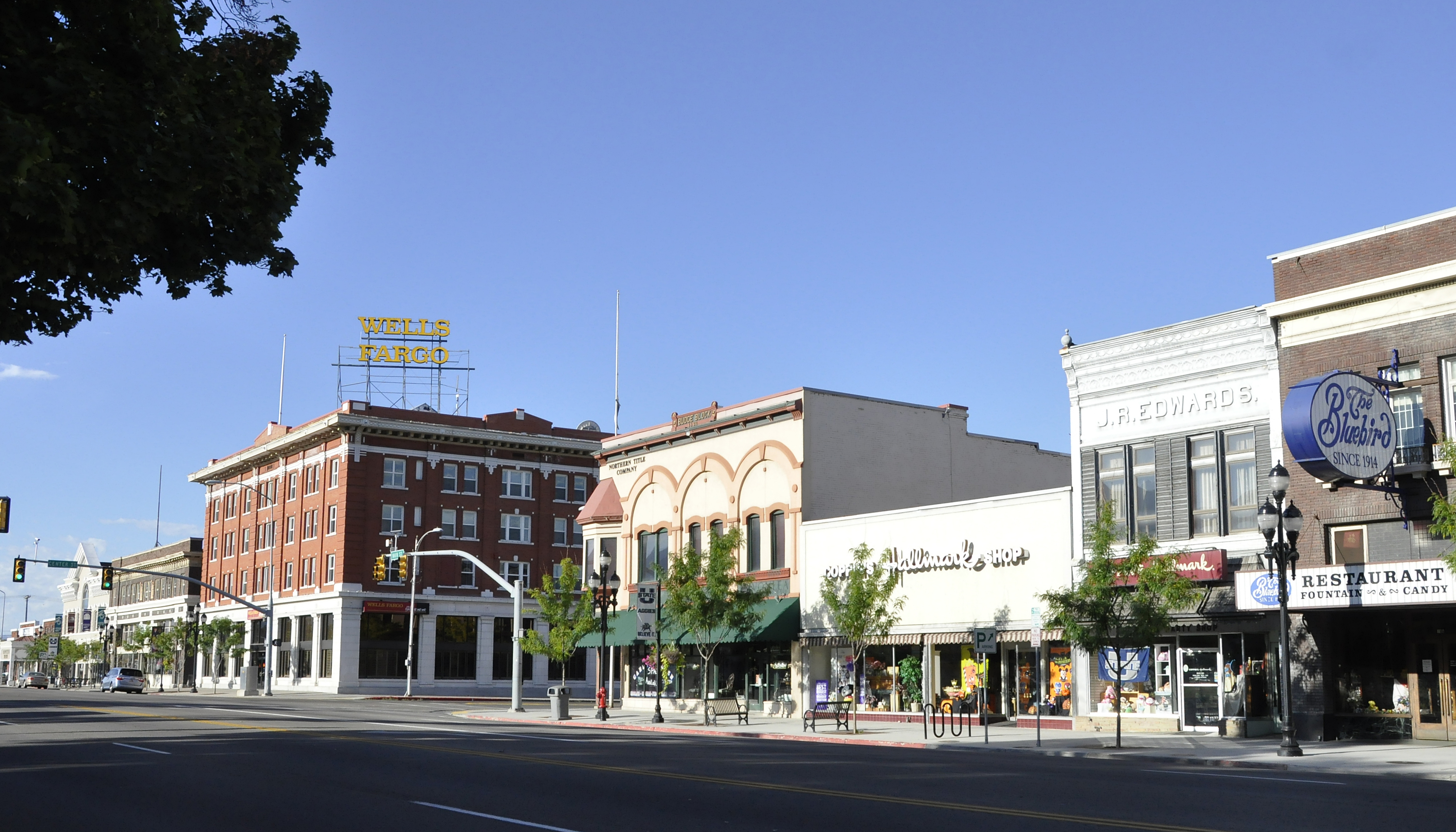
(2014) Downtown. Logan, Utah

== Timeline ==
Year(s)	# Yrs.	Team	Level	League
1902	1	Logan	Independent	Utah State League
1921	1	Logan Collegians	Class D	Northern Utah League
1926–1927	2	Logan Collegians	Class C	Utah-Idaho League

== Year–by–year records ==
Year	Record	Finish	Manager	Playoffs/Notes
1902	00–00	NA	Harry Stovey	League records unknown
1921	8–9	4th	Lewis Edwards	No playoffs held
1926	48–65	4th	Harry Wolter / Nick Williams / Nate Shandling	No playoffs held
1927	49–51	4th	Harry Wolter	Non playoffs held

== Notable alumni ==
- Dolph Camilli (1926–1927)
- Ed Coleman (1926)
- Roy Hartzell (1902)
- Eddie Quick (1902)
- Lou Rosenberg (1927)
- Harry Stovey (1902, MGR)
- Harry Wolter (1926–1927, MGR)
- Logan Collegians players
