= Tremonton (baseball) =

Tremonton "Bears"
- 1921; Tremonton, Utah

Minor league affiliations
- Class: Class D (1921)
- League: Northern Utah League (1921)

Major league affiliations
- Team: None

Minor league titles
- Conference titles (1): 1921

Team data
- Name: Tremonton "Bears" (1921)
- Ballpark: Schuman Park* (1921)

The Tremonton team was a minor league baseball team based in Tremonton, Utah in 1921. Tremonton was identified under the "Bears" moniker as the team played as a member of the Class D level Northern Utah League in 1921, winning a split season championship.

== History ==
Tremonton was a member when the Northern Utah League first began play in the 1921 season as a six–team Class D level minor league. The Northern Utah League's charter franchises based in Brigham City, Utah (Brigham City "Peaches"), Lewiston, Idaho (Lewiston Broncs), Logan, Utah (Logan Collegians), Ogden, Utah (Ogden) and Smithfield, Utah (Smithfield) joined Tremonton, in the newly formed league.

Reports and a team photograph refer to the 1921 Tremonton team nickname as the "Bears."

The "Bears" moniker would likely be a reference to Tremonton's location within the Bear River Valley. Tremonton was founded in 1888 and is the largest city within the Bear River Valley.

Tremonton began Northern Utah League began play on May 4, 1921, as the league played a split season schedule. The second half began on July 4, 1921. The six–team league overall standings consisted of Brigham City (7–9), the Lewiston Broncs (4–11), Logan Collegians (8–9), Ogden (11–5), Smithfield (6–10) and Tremonton (12–4). With their 12–4 record, Tremonton had the best record in the league. It was reported that Tremonton finished 15–5 in the second half standings to again finish in first place in the standings.

Records conflict, but reports in the "1921 Northern Utah League Summary" by Ray Olson, the league secretary, have the Brigham City "Peaches" winning the overall championship after winning the first half with a 12–4 records. Reportedly, Tremonton won the second half, beating Ogden in a three–game playoff series after the two clubs finished the season tied for first place with 15–5 records. Tremonton pitcher Franklin Coray reportedly defeated Ogden in the first game, throwing a no–hitter in a 2–0 victory. In a five–game series for the league title, the Brigham Peaches reportedly defeated the Tremonton "Bears" 3 games to 2.

In a game on July 3, 1921, Ogden pitcher Dave Davenport pitched a perfect game in a 4–0 Ogden victory over Tremonton. Davenport was later released for being too dominant in the Northern Utah League, with a 7–0 record.

Reports show Tremonton player Spencer Adams leading the Northern Utah League in batting average, hitting .431.

The Northern Utah League permanently folded as a minor league following the 1921 season. Tremonton, Utah has not hosted another minor league team.

== The ballpark ==
The name of the 1921 Tremonton home minor league ballpark is not directly referenced. Schuman Park was in use in the era, having been founded in 1906 as the first city park in the city. It was named after John Schuman, a founder of Tremonton. Schuman sold his property to the city at a price of $50.00 to establish the park. Schuman Park is still in use today as a public park with amenities. It is located at 220 North Tremont Street.

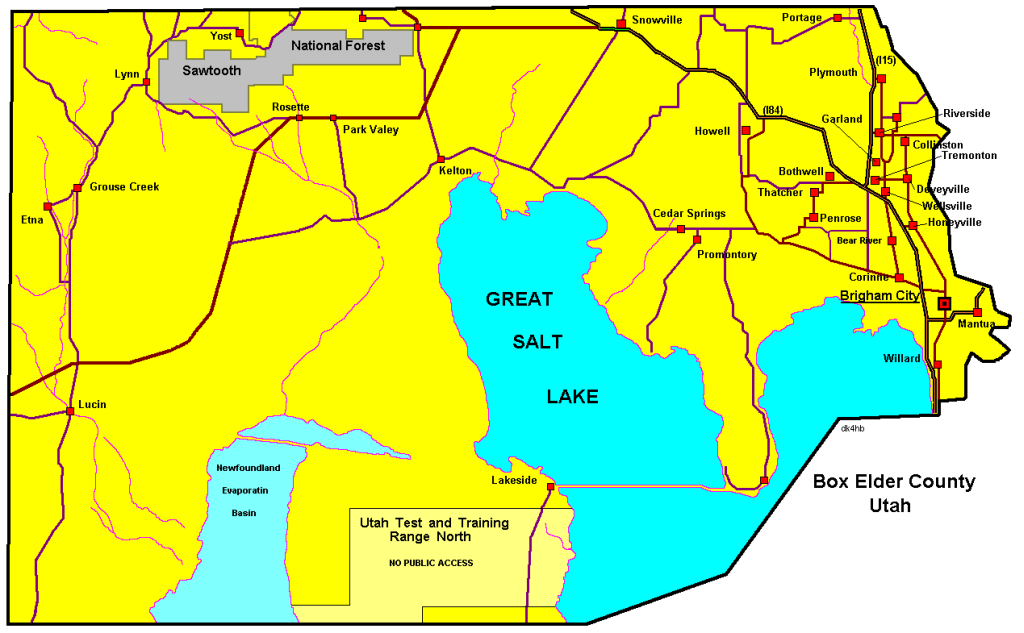
Map Box Elder County, Utah. Tremonton, Utah (at right)

== Year–by–year record ==
Year	Record	Finish	Manager	Playoffs/Notes
1921	27–9*	1st	NA	Pennant winners Lost in finals

== Notable alumni ==
- Spencer Adams (1921)
