= Adam Spencer (disambiguation) =

Adam Spencer may refer to:

- Adam Spencer (born 1969), Australian comedian
- Adam Spencer (curler) (born 1972), Canadian curler
- Adam Spencer (runner) (born 2001), Australian runner
- Adam Spencer (priest) (14th century), former English Archdeacon of Cleveland

== See also ==
- Spencer Adams (1898–1970), American baseball player
