= Northern Utah League =

- Classification: Class D (1921)
- Sport: Minor League Baseball
- First season: 1921
- Folded: 1921
- Director: Ray Olson
- President: Unknown (1921)
- No. of teams: 6
- Country: United States of America
- Most titles: 1 Tremonton (1921); Brigham City (1921)*
- Related competitions: Utah-Idaho Intermountain League

The Northern Utah League was a six–team Class D level baseball minor league that played in the 1921 season. The Northern Utah League featured teams based in Idaho and Utah. The Northern Utah League permanently folded after its only season of minor league play. Today, the league name has been revived by the summer collegiate baseball league.

== History ==
The Northern Utah League first began minor league play in the 1921 season as a six–team Class D level league. The Northern Utah League's six charter franchises were based in Brigham City, Utah (Brigham City), Lewiston, Idaho (Lewiston Broncs), Logan, Utah (Logan Collegians), Ogden, Utah (Ogden), Smithfield, Utah (Smithfield) and Tremonton, Utah (Tremonton).

The Northern Utah League began play on May 4, 1921, playing a split season schedule. The second half began on July 4, 1921. The six–team league final overall standings from database references consisted of Brigham City (7–9), the Lewiston Broncs (4–11), Logan Collegians (8–9), Ogden (11–5), Smithfield (6–10) and Tremonton (12–4). With a 12–4 record, Tremonton had the best record in the league.

Records conflict, but the "1921 Northern Utah League Summary" by Ray Olson, the league secretary, has the Brigham City "Peaches" winning the overall championship. In the summary, Brigham City were the league champions after winning the first half standings with a 12–4 record and the championship series. Reportedly, Tremonton won the second half standings, beating Ogden in a three–game playoff series after the two clubs finished the second half season tied with 15–5 records. Tremonton pitcher Franklin Coray reportedly defeated Ogden in the first game, throwing a no–hitter in a 2–0 victory. In a five–game series for the league title, the Brigham Peaches reportedly defeated the Tremonton "Bears" 3 games to 2.

On June 11, 1921, Smithfield turned a triple play in a game against the Logan Collegians.

On July 3, 1921, Ogden pitcher Dave Davenport pitched a perfect game in a 4–0 Ogden victory over Tremonton. Davenport was later released for being too dominant in the Northern Utah League, after compiling a 7–0 record.

Reports have Tremonton player Spencer Adams leading the league in batting average, hitting .431.

Today, the "Northern Utah League" name has been revived by the summer collegiate baseball league.

== Northern Utah League teams ==
Team name(s)	City represented	Ballpark	Year
Brigham City "Peaches"	Brigham City, Utah	Unknown	1921
Lewiston Broncs	Lewiston, Idaho	Unknown	1921
Logan Collegians	Logan, Utah	Unknown	1921
Ogden	Ogden, Utah	Unknown	1921
Smithfield "Blue Sox"	Smithfield, Utah	Unknown	1921
Tremonton "Bears"	Tremonton, Utah	League Park	1921

== 1921 Northern Utah League overall standings ==
Team standings	W	L	PCT	GB	Managers
Tremonton	12	4	.596	–	NA
Ogden	11	5	.688	1	NA
Logan Collegians	8	9	.471	4	Lewis Edwards
Brigham City	7	9	.438	4½	NA
Smithfiled	6	10	.375	6	NA
Lewiston Broncs	4	11	.267	8	NA
