= Lou Rosenberg =

American baseball player (1904–1991)

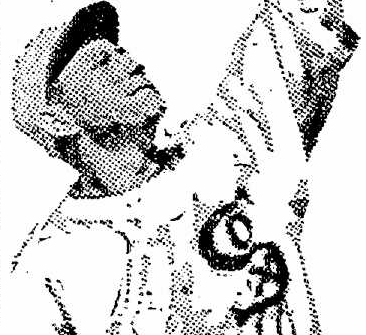
- Second baseman / Shortstop
- Born: March 5, 1904; San Francisco, California, U.S.
- Died: September 8, 1991 (aged 87); San Francisco, California, U.S.
- Batted: Right Threw: Right

MLB debut
- May 22, 1923, for the Chicago White Sox

Last MLB appearance
- July 16, 1923, for the Chicago White Sox

MLB statistics
- Batting average: .250
- Hits: 1
- Stats at Baseball Reference

Teams
- Chicago White Sox (1923)

Louis Rosenberg (March 5, 1904 – September 8, 1991) was an American professional baseball player whose career spanned three seasons, one of which was spent in Major League Baseball (MLB) with the Chicago White Sox (1923). During his time in the majors, he played second base and batted .250 with one hit, and one strikeout in four at-bats. Rosenberg also played in the minor leagues for two seasons with the Twin Falls Bruins (1926–27), Logan Collegians (1927), and Baltimore Orioles (1927). In the minors, he had a lifetime batting average of .331 with 233 hits, 51 doubles, 15 triples, and 16 home runs. During his playing career, he stood at 5 feet 7 inches (170 cm) and weighed in at 150 pounds (68 kg). He batted and threw right-handed. Rosenberg's brother, Harry, also played professional baseball.

== Early life ==
Rosenberg was born on March 5, 1904, in San Francisco, California, to Benjamin and Dora Rosenberg, both of Russia. Lou Rosenberg had eight siblings; sisters Celia, Dora, and Lottie; and brothers Harry, Max, Meyer, Hyman and Samuel Their father worked as a contractor in the San Francisco Bay Area. Lou Rosenberg's brother, Harry, was a Major League Baseball (MLB) player with the New York Giants. Lou Rosenberg, like his siblings, did not have a middle name, although some records indicated his middle initial was "C". He was Jewish.

== Baseball career ==
In 1922, Rosenberg was playing in the California Winter League. Before 1923, Rosenberg played sandlot ball in San Francisco. The Chicago White Sox signed Rosenberg during spring training in 1923 since they were short players on their roster after Eddie Collins and Ernie Johnson failed to report. During his spring training debut, collected three hits. He made his MLB debut on May 22, against the New York Yankees, where in one at-bat he struck out. On July 16, which would later prove to be his final MLB game, Rosenberg collected his first major league hit, which was off of Philadelphia Athletics pitcher Slim Harriss. That season, he was used as a pinch hitter and second baseman. He collected one hit in four at-bats with the White Sox that year. At 19, he was the second-youngest player in the American League that season. On July 24, the White Sox assigned Rosenberg to their minor league team in Galveston, Texas.

In April 1926, Rosenberg signed with the Class-C Twin Falls Bruins of the Utah–Idaho League. With the Bruins that season, he batted .354 with 139 hits, 32 doubles, 10 triples, and 13 home runs in 105 games played. He was fourth in the league in home runs and fifth in doubles. At the end of the season, it was announced that he would return to Twin Falls in 1927. With Twin Falls that season, he batted .273 with 36 hits, five doubles, and one home run in 36 games played. Mid-season that year, he joined the Class-C Logan Collegians, also of the Utah–Idaho League. With Logan, Rosenberg batted .326 with 58 hits, 14 doubles, five triples, and two home runs in 48 games played. Rosenberg also played for the Double-A Baltimore Orioles of the International League. He played just one game with the Orioles, and his stats were never kept. Before the start of the 1928 season, it was announced that Rosenberg was to play for the Logan Collegians of the Utah–Idaho League, but the team ceased operations before the season.

== Later life ==
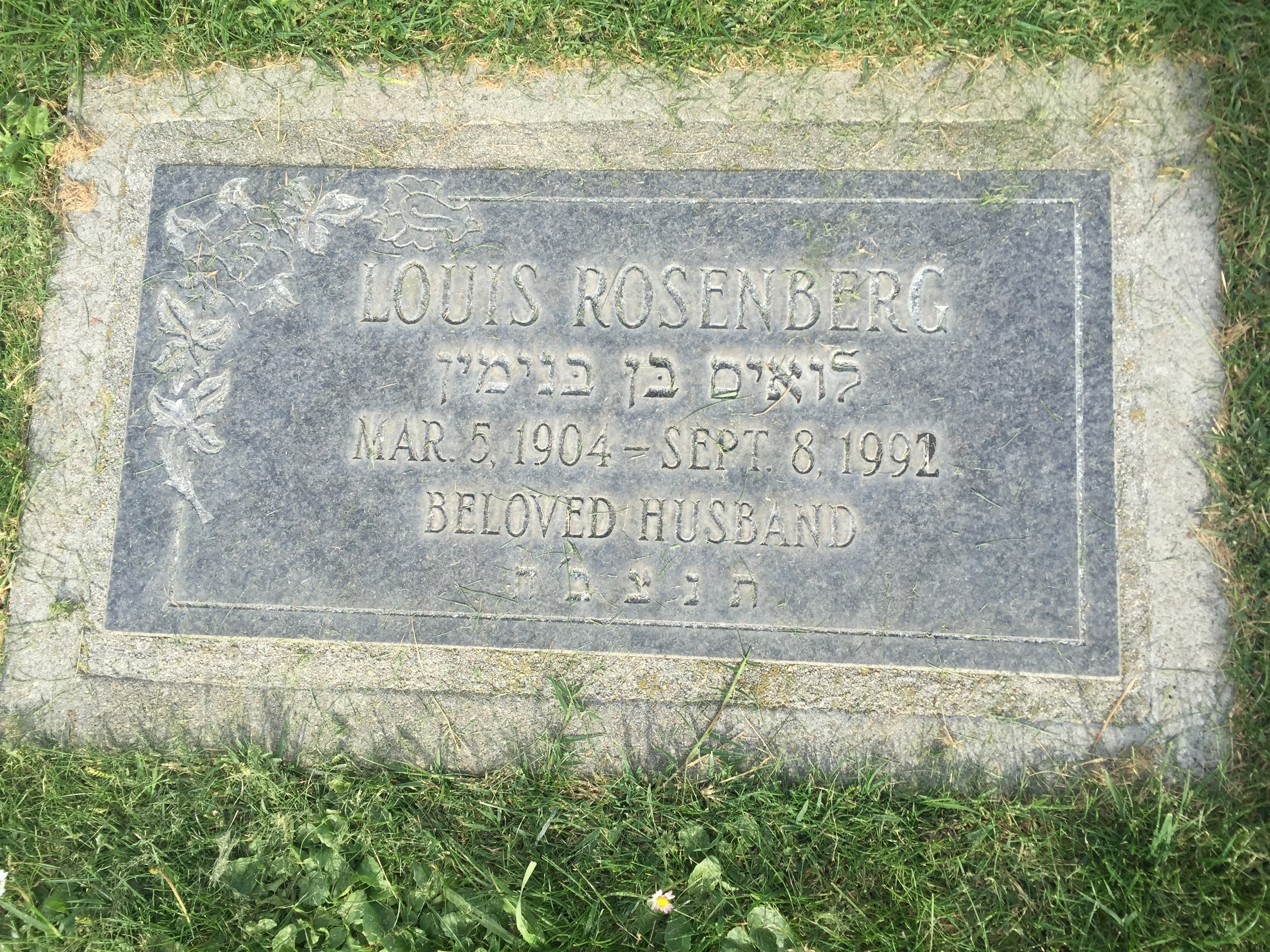

Rosenberg resided in San Francisco with his wife, Sylvia, after his baseball career was over. Rosenberg owned a plant nursery business, Sunset Garden Supply. During an interview, when asked who the greatest baseball player of all time was, Rosenberg answered Ty Cobb. He died on September 8, 1991, in San Francisco. He was buried at Eternal Home Cemetery in Daly City, California.
