= Northwest League Manager of the Year Award =

- Sport: Baseball
- League: Northwest League
- Awarded for: Best regular-season manager in the Northwest League
- Country: United States
- Presented by: Northwest League

History
- First award: Hugh Luby (1956)
- Most wins: Steve Decker (3); Cliff Ditto (3); John McNamara (3)
- Most recent: Jacob Heyward (2026)

The Northwest League Manager of the Year Award is an annual award given to the best manager in Minor League Baseball's Northwest League based on their regular-season performance as voted on by league managers. Broadcasters, Minor League Baseball executives, and members of the media have previously voted as well. Though the league was established in 1955, the award was not created until 1956. After the cancellation of the 2020 season, the league was known as the High-A West in 2021 before reverting to the Northwest League name in 2022.

The only managers to win the award on three occasions are Steve Decker (2005, 2006, and 2007), Cliff Ditto (1971, 1976, and 1977), and John McNamara (1960, 1961, and 1962). Eight others have each won twice: Tim Hulett, Hugh Luby, Bobby Malkmus, Rob Mummau, Fred Ocasio, Greg Riddoch, Fred Stanley and Joe Vavra.

Twelve managers from the Eugene Emeralds have been selected for the Manager of the Year Award, more than any other team in the league, followed by the Spokane Indians (8); the Lewiston Broncs (7); the Salem-Keizer Volcanoes (6); the Tri-City Padres (4); the Boise Hawks, Everett AquaSox, Salem Dodgers, Southern Oregon Timberjacks, and Vancouver Canadians (3); Bellingham Mariners, Hillsboro Hops, Medford A's, Tri-City Dust Devils, Walla Walla Padres, and Yakima Bears (2); and the Bellingham Giants, Central Oregon Phillies, Grays Harbor Loggers, Portland Rockies, Rogue Valley Dodgers, Tri-Cities Triplets, and Wenatchee Chiefs (1).

Eleven managers from the San Francisco Giants Major League Baseball (MLB) organization have won the award, more than any other, followed by the Oakland Athletics organization (9); the San Diego Padres organization (7); the Los Angeles Dodgers organization (6); the Seattle Mariners and Texas Rangers organizations (5); the Chicago Cubs, Colorado Rockies, Kansas City Royals, and Toronto Blue Jays organizations (3); the Arizona Diamondbacks, Baltimore Orioles, Los Angeles Angels, Philadelphia Phillies, and St. Louis Cardinals organizations (2); and the Cincinnati Reds organization (1). Five award winners managed teams that were not affiliated with any MLB organization.

== Winners ==
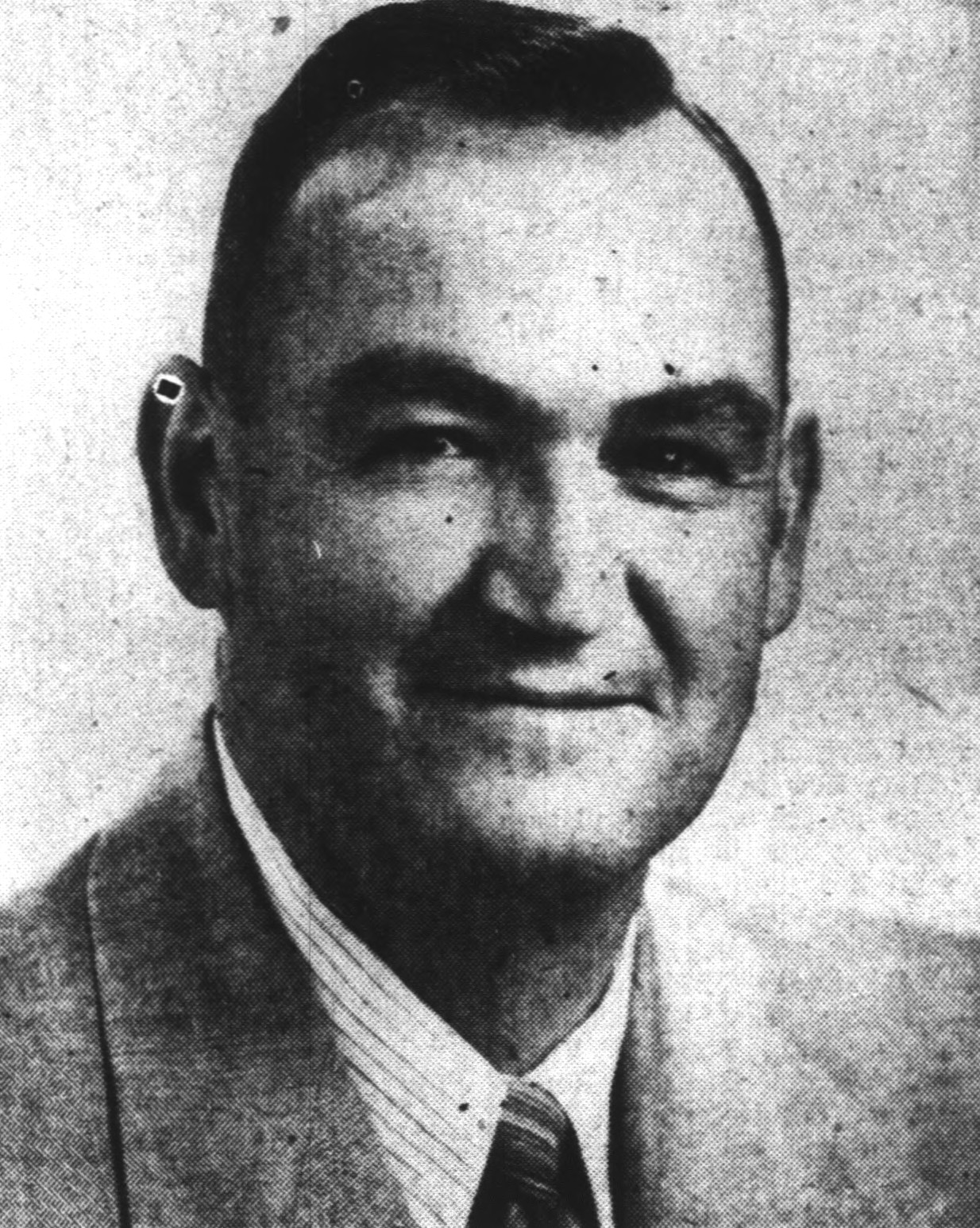
Hugh Luby won the first two Manager of the Year Awards (1956 and 1957).

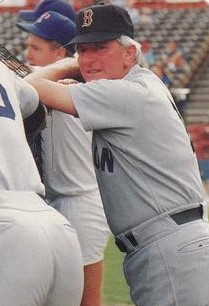
John McNamara won three consecutive Manager of the Year Awards (1960, 1961, and 1962) and the 1986 American League Manager of the Year Award.

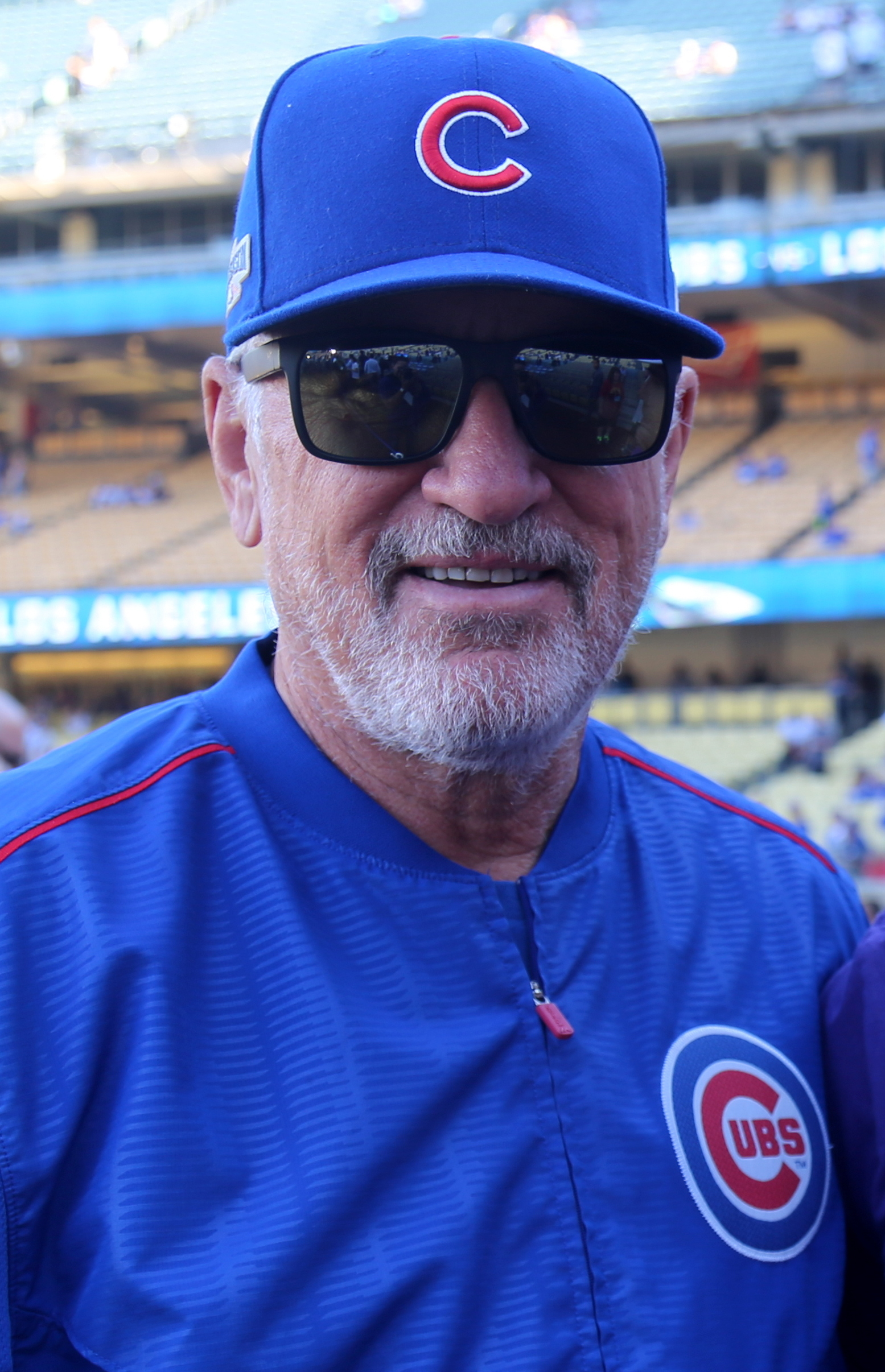
Joe Maddon, winner of the 1982 award, won two American League Manager of the Year Awards (2008 and 2011) and one National League Manager of the Year Award (2015).

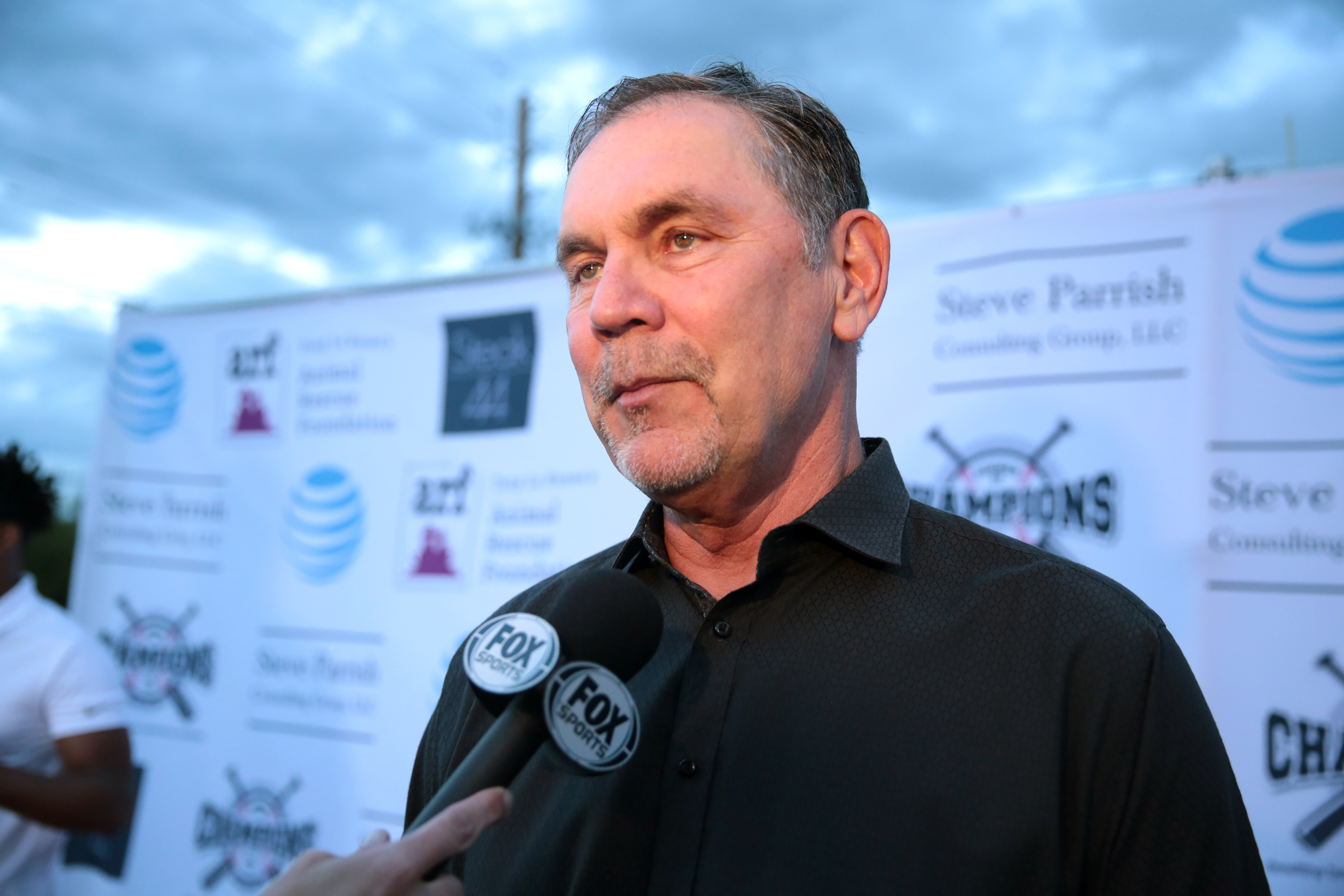
Bruce Bochy, the 1989 winner, won the 1996 National League Manager of the Year Award.

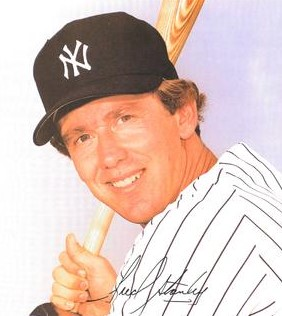
Fred Stanley won back-to-back Manager of the Year Awards (2000 and 2001).

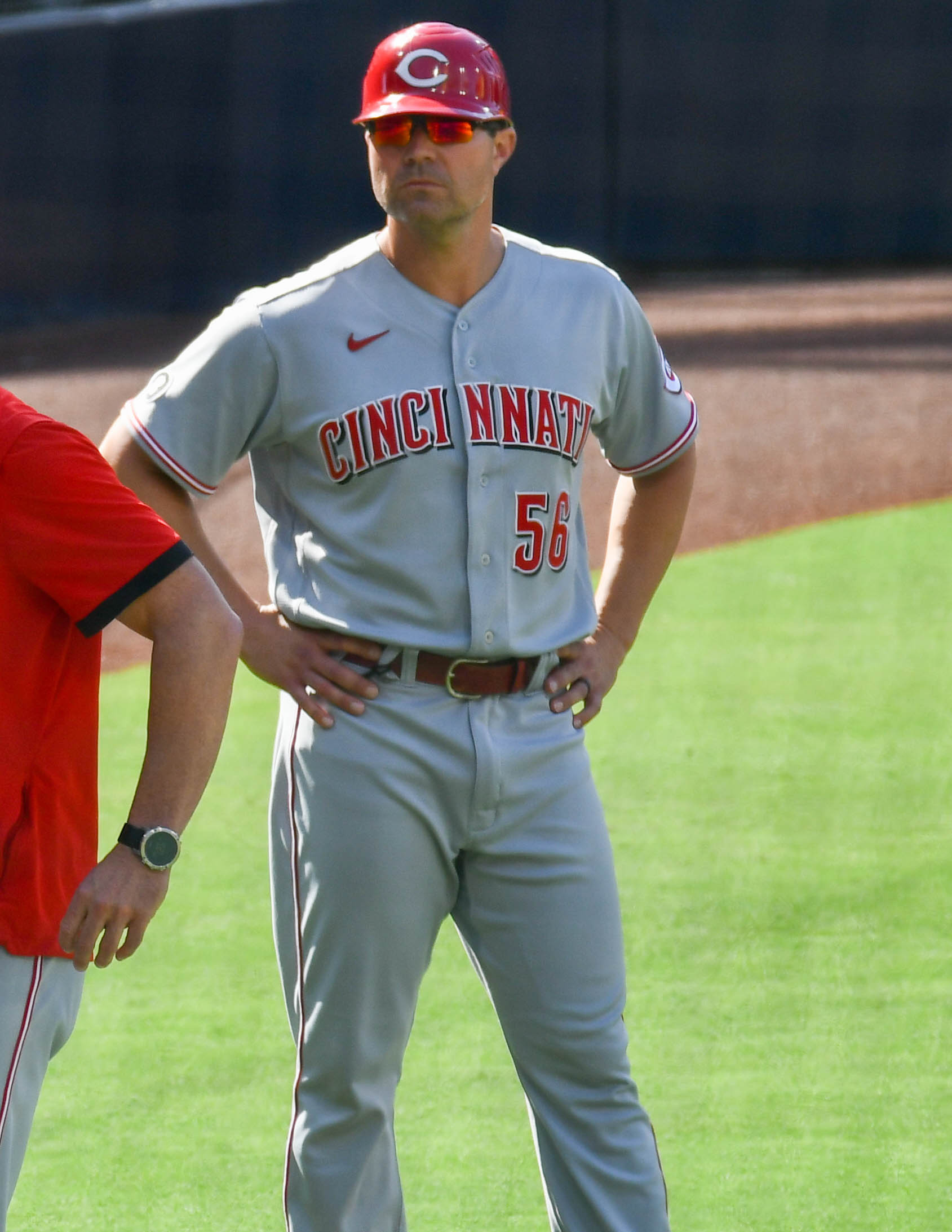
J. R. House was the 2014 Manager of the Year.

Key
League	The team's final position in the league standings
Division	The team's final position in the divisional standings
Record	The team's wins and losses during the regular season
(#)	Number of wins by managers who won the award multiple times
^	Indicates multiple award winners in the same year
*	Indicates league champions

Winners
Year	Winner	Team	Organization	League	Division	Record	Ref(s).
1956	Hugh Luby (1)	Salem Senators	—	3rd (tie)	—	64–68	
1957	Hugh Luby (2)	Eugene Emeralds	—	1st	—	77–58	
1958	Hillis Layne	Lewiston Broncs	—	1st	—	80–56	
1959	Dick Wilson	Wenatchee Chiefs	—	2nd	—	74–67	
1960	John McNamara (1)	Lewiston Broncs	Kansas City Athletics	3rd	—	78–63	
1961	John McNamara (2)	Lewiston Broncs*	Kansas City Athletics	1st	—	84–56	
1962	John McNamara (3)	Lewiston Broncs*	Kansas City Athletics	5th	—	66–75	
1963	William Robertson	Lewiston Broncs	Kansas City Athletics	3rd	—	77–63	
1964	Stan Wasiak	Salem Dodgers	Los Angeles Dodgers	1st	—	78–62	
1965	Cal Ripken Sr.	Tri-City Atoms*	Baltimore Orioles	2nd	—	81–58	
1966	Duke Snider	Tri-City Atoms*	Los Angeles Dodgers	1st	—	57–27	
1967	Bobby Malkmus (1)	Eugene Emeralds	Philadelphia Phillies	1st	—	50–34	
1968	Don LeJohn	Tri-City Atoms*	Los Angeles Dodgers	1st	—	45–30	
1969	Bill Berrier	Rogue Valley Dodgers*	Los Angeles Dodgers	1st	—	50–29	
1970	Fred Hatfield	Lewis-Clark Broncs*	St. Louis Cardinals	2nd	1st	43–37	
1971	Cliff Ditto (1)	Tri-City Padres*	St. Louis Cardinals	1st	1st	50–30	
1972	Bobby Malkmus (2)	Lewis-Clark Broncs*	Baltimore Orioles	1st	1st	54–26	
1973	None selected						
1974	None selected						
1975	Greg Riddoch (1)	Eugene Emeralds*	Cincinnati Reds	1st	1st	54–25	
1976	Cliff Ditto (2)	Walla Walla Padres*	San Diego Padres	1st	1st	46–26	
1977	Cliff Ditto (3)	Walla Walla Padres	San Diego Padres	3rd	2nd	41–27	
1978	Bill Bryk	Grays Harbor Loggers*	—	1st	1st	47–23	
1979	Tom Harmon	Central Oregon Phillies*	Philadelphia Phillies	1st	1st	43–28	
1980	Jeff Scott	Bellingham Mariners*	Seattle Mariners	1st	1st	45–25	
1981	Brad Fischer	Medford A's*	Oakland Athletics	1st	1st	42–28	
1982	Joe Maddon	Salem Angels*	California Angels	2nd	1st	34–36	
1983	Dennis Rogers	Medford A's*	Oakland Athletics	1st	1st	50–18	
1984	Marty Scott	Tri-Cities Triplets*	Texas Rangers	1st	1st	46–28	
1985	Frank Funk	Eugene Emeralds	Kansas City Royals	1st (tie)	1st	40–34	
1986	Sal Rende	Bellingham Mariners*	Seattle Mariners	1st (tie)	1st	45–29	
1987	Rob Picciolo	Spokane Indians*	San Diego Padres	1st	1st	54–22	
1988	Lenn Sakata	Southern Oregon A's	Oakland Athletics	1st	1st	46–30	
1989	Bruce Bochy	Spokane Indians*	San Diego Padres	3rd	1st	41–34	
1990	Gene Glynn	Spokane Indians*	San Diego Padres	2nd	1st	49–27	
1991	Tom Poquette	Eugene Emeralds	Kansas City Royals	3rd	2nd	42–34	
1992	Tom Kotchman	Boise Hawks	California Angels	3rd	2nd	40–36	
1993	Dick Scott	Southern Oregon A's	Oakland Athletics	5th	3rd	37–39	
1994	Joe Vavra (1)	Yakima Bears	Los Angeles Dodgers	1st	1st	49–27	
1995	Glenn Tufts	Bellingham Giants	San Francisco Giants	2nd	1st	43–33	
1996	Joe Vavra (2)	Yakima Bears*	Los Angeles Dodgers	3rd	1st	40–36	
1997	Jim Eppard	Portland Rockies*	Colorado Rockies	3rd	1st	44–32	
1998	Keith Comstock	Salem-Keizer Volcanoes*	San Francisco Giants	3rd (tie)	1st (tie)	43–33	
1999^	Kevin Long	Spokane Indians*	Kansas City Royals	1st	1st	44–32	
1999^	Greg Sparks	Southern Oregon Timberjacks	Oakland Athletics	5th	2nd	38–38	
2000	Fred Stanley (1)	Salem-Keizer Volcanoes	San Francisco Giants	7th	3rd	36–40	
2001	Fred Stanley (2)	Salem-Keizer Volcanoes*	San Francisco Giants	2nd	1st	51–25	
2002	Steve McFarland	Boise Hawks*	Chicago Cubs	1st	1st	49–27	
2003	Darryl Kennedy	Spokane Indians*	Texas Rangers	1st	1st	50–26	
2004	Tom Beyers	Boise Hawks*	Chicago Cubs	1st (tie)	1st	42–34	
2005	Steve Decker (1)	Salem-Keizer Volcanoes	San Francisco Giants	2nd	2nd	45–31	
2006^	Doug Dascenzo	Eugene Emeralds	San Diego Padres	3rd	2nd	43–33	
2006^	Steve Decker (2)	Salem-Keizer Volcanoes*	San Francisco Giants	1st	1st	55–21	
2007^	Steve Decker (3)	Salem-Keizer Volcanoes*	San Francisco Giants	1st	1st	57–19	
2007^	Greg Riddoch (2)	Eugene Emeralds	San Diego Padres	6th	4th	34–42	
2008	Tim Hulett (1)	Spokane Indians*	Texas Rangers	1st	1st	51–25	
2009	Fred Ocasio (1)	Tri-City Dust Devils	Colorado Rockies	2nd	1st	47–29	
2010	Tim Hulett (2)	Spokane Indians	Texas Rangers	2nd	1st	43–33	
2011	Fred Ocasio (2)	Tri-City Dust Devils	Colorado Rockies	2nd	1st	44–32	
2012	Clayton McCullough	Vancouver Canadians*	Toronto Blue Jays	2nd	2nd	46–30	
2013	Rob Mummau (1)	Everett AquaSox	Seattle Mariners	2nd	1st	44–32	
2014	J. R. House	Hillsboro Hops*	Arizona Diamondbacks	1st	1st	48–28	
2015	Rob Mummau (2)	Everett AquaSox	Seattle Mariners	2nd (tie)	1st (tie)	42–34	
2016	Jesús Feliciano	Eugene Emeralds*	Chicago Cubs	1st	1st	54–22	
2017	Rich Miller	Vancouver Canadians*	Toronto Blue Jays	1st	1st	43–33	
2018	Shawn Roof	Hillsboro Hops	Arizona Diamondbacks	1st	1st	51–25	
2019	Kenny Hook	Spokane Indians	Texas Rangers	3rd	1st	45–31	
2020	None selected (season cancelled due to COVID-19 pandemic)						
2021	Dennis Pelfrey	Eugene Emeralds*	San Francisco Giants	1st	—	69–50	
2022	Carlos Valderrama	Eugene Emeralds*	San Francisco Giants	1st	—	81–48	
2023	Ryan Scott	Everett AquaSox	Seattle Mariners	2nd	—	74–58	
2024	Brent Lavallee	Vancouver Canadians	Toronto Blue Jays	2nd (tie)	—	68–61	
2025	Jeremiah Knackstedt	Eugene Emeralds	San Francisco Giants	1st	—	81–51	
2026	Jacob Heyward	Eugene Emeralds	San Francisco Giants	1st	—	79–52	

== Wins by team ==
Active Northwest League teams appear in bold.

Team	Award(s)	Year(s)
**Eugene Emeralds**	12	1957, 1967, 1975, 1985, 1991, 2006, 2007, 2016, 2021, 2022, 2025, 2026
**Spokane Indians**	8	1987, 1989, 1990, 1999, 2003, 2008, 2010, 2019
Lewiston Broncs (Lewis-Clark Broncs)	7	1958, 1960, 1961, 1962, 1963, 1970, 1972
Salem-Keizer Volcanoes	6	1998, 2000, 2001, 2005, 2006, 2007
Tri-City Padres (Tri-City Atoms)	4	1965, 1966, 1968, 1971
Boise Hawks	3	1992, 2002, 2004
**Everett AquaSox**	3	2013, 2015, 2023
Salem Dodgers (Salem Angels/Senators)	3	1956, 1964, 1982
Southern Oregon Timberjacks (Southern Oregon A's)	3	1988, 1993, 1999
**Vancouver Canadians**	3	2012, 2017, 2024
Bellingham Mariners	2	1980, 1986
**Hillsboro Hops**	2	2014, 2018
Medford A's	2	1981, 1983
**Tri-City Dust Devils**	2	2009, 2011
Walla Walla Padres	2	1976, 1977
Yakima Bears	2	1994, 1996
Bellingham Giants	1	1995
Central Oregon Phillies	1	1979
Grays Harbor Loggers	1	1978
Portland Rockies	1	1997
Rogue Valley Dodgers	1	1969
Tri-Cities Triplets	1	1984
Wenatchee Chiefs	1	1959

== Wins by organization ==
Active Northwest League–Major League Baseball affiliations appear in bold.

Organization	Award(s)	Year(s)
**San Francisco Giants**	11	1995, 1998, 2000, 2001, 2005, 2006, 2007, 2021, 2022, 2025, 2026
Oakland Athletics (Kansas City Athletics)	9	1960, 1961, 1962, 1963, 1981, 1983, 1988, 1993, 1999
San Diego Padres	7	1976, 1977, 1987, 1989, 1990, 2006, 2007
Los Angeles Dodgers	6	1964, 1966, 1968, 1969, 1994, 1996
**Seattle Mariners**	5	1980, 1986, 2013, 2015, 2023
Texas Rangers	5	1984, 2003, 2008, 2010, 2019
Chicago Cubs	3	2002, 2004, 2016
**Colorado Rockies**	3	1997, 2009, 2011
Kansas City Royals	3	1985, 1991, 1999
**Toronto Blue Jays**	3	2012, 2017, 2024
**Arizona Diamondbacks**	2	2014, 2018
Baltimore Orioles	2	1965, 1972
**Los Angeles Angels** (California Angels)	2	1982, 1992
Philadelphia Phillies	2	1967, 1979
St. Louis Cardinals	2	1970, 1971
Cincinnati Reds	1	1975
