= KSPZ =

- Ammon, Idaho; United States
- Broadcast area: Idaho Falls, Idaho
- Frequency: 980 kHz
- Branding: The Sports Zone 980

Programming
- Format: Sports
- Affiliations: Fox Sports Radio; Idaho Falls Chukars

Ownership
- Owner: Sandhill Media Group, LLC

History
- First air date: November 9, 1957 (as KUPI)
- Former call signs: KUPI (1957–2007)
- Call sign meaning: K SPorts Zone

Technical information
- Licensing authority: FCC
- Facility ID: 55238
- Class: B
- Power: 5,000 watts day 1,000 watts night
- Transmitter coordinates: 43°31′23″N 112°0′36″W
- Translator: 98.7 K254DI (Idaho Falls)

Links
- Public license information: Public file; LMS
- Webcast: Listen Live
- Website: 980thezone.com

KSPZ (980 AM) is a radio station broadcasting a sports talk format. Licensed to Ammon, Idaho, United States, the station serves the Idaho Falls/Ammon area. The station is currently owned by Sandhill Media Group, LLC and features programming from Fox Sports Radio. The station is the radio home of the Idaho Falls Chukars, broadcasting all games (exhibition, regular season, and postseason).

The majority of the programming on KSPZ is Fox Sports Radio's nationally syndicated content including talk shows and professional/major college sporting events. However, there is plenty of local coverage including the Chukars, area highs schools, Boise State football, and BYU.

John Balginy is the station manager and has broadcast Chukars games since 1985. Balginy is also the voice of Idaho Falls High School and Skyline High School (Idaho) on KSPZ. For 2020, Tyler Petersen will broadcast all Chukars games (home and road) for the station and will work alongside Balginy for all games at Melaleuca Field.
