= Tim Hulett =

American baseball player (born 1960)

- Third baseman / Second baseman
- Born: January 12, 1960 (age 66); Springfield, Illinois, U.S.
- Batted: Right Threw: Right

MLB debut
- September 15, 1983, for the Chicago White Sox

Last MLB appearance
- May 14, 1995, for the St. Louis Cardinals

MLB statistics
- Batting average: .249
- Home runs: 48
- Runs batted in: 220
- Stats at Baseball Reference

Teams
- Chicago White Sox (1983–1987); Baltimore Orioles (1989–1994); St. Louis Cardinals (1995)

Timothy Craig Hulett Sr. (born January 12, 1960) is an American former professional baseball infielder in the major leagues from 1983-1995, who currently serves as the head baseball coach at Evangel Christian Academy in Shreveport, Louisiana. He was the manager for the Minor League Baseball Spokane Indians in the Texas Rangers organization for 10 years. He played for the Chicago White Sox, Baltimore Orioles, and St. Louis Cardinals.

== Playing career ==
Hulett was drafted in the 1978 Major League Baseball draft out of Lanphier High School but did not sign. Hulett played for the South Florida Bulls baseball team in 1979 before transferring to Miami Dade College's North Campus.

Hulett was picked in the secondary phase of the 1980 free agent draft by the Chicago White Sox and signed in June 1980. He made it to the major leagues with the White Sox in 1983, was traded to the Montreal Expos organization in 1988, and played in the major leagues with the Baltimore Orioles and St. Louis Cardinals before retiring in 1995.

== Coaching career ==
Hulett became the manager of the short-season Low-A Spokane Indians in the Texas Rangers organization in 2007; he led them to the Northwest League Championship in 2008 and was named Northwest League Manager of the Year. In 2010, Hulett's Indians were Eastern Division champions in 2010 and Northwest League runners-up, and Hulett was named NWL Manager of the Year for the second time. He was succeeded by Matt Hagen for the 2017 season.

After the 2004 season, Tim Hulett was promoted from assistant baseball coach to head coach at Evangel Christian Academy in Shreveport, Louisiana. He has led the Evangel Eagles to five state titles in 2006, 2009, 2011, 2013, and 2014.

Hulett managed the Philippines national baseball team during their attempt to qualify for the 2017 World Baseball Classic.

== Personal life ==
His son Tug Hulett is a graduate of Evangel, and is an infielder who played briefly in the major leagues in 2008 and 2009. He played in the minor leagues until 2012. Another son, Jeff Hulett, was drafted by the Houston Astros in the 12th round of the 2008 draft, and played in the Astros' minor league organization in 2008 and 2009.

On July 23, 1992, Hulett and his family suffered a terrible tragedy when his 6-year-old son, Samuel Wayne Hulett, died of injuries that he suffered when he was struck by a car the previous day. Sam and his three brothers were walking home from a playground near their home in Cockeysville, Maryland, when he darted from the curb of a roadway and into the path of the car. Hulett was placed on the 15-day disabled list after the incident; at that time, there was no provision in baseball's rules for bereavement leave. The situation was an impetus for the subsequent adoption of the two Family Leave lists—the bereavement list and the paternity list—adopted by Major League Baseball eventually.
