= Jesús Feliciano =

Puerto Rican baseball player and coach (born 1979)

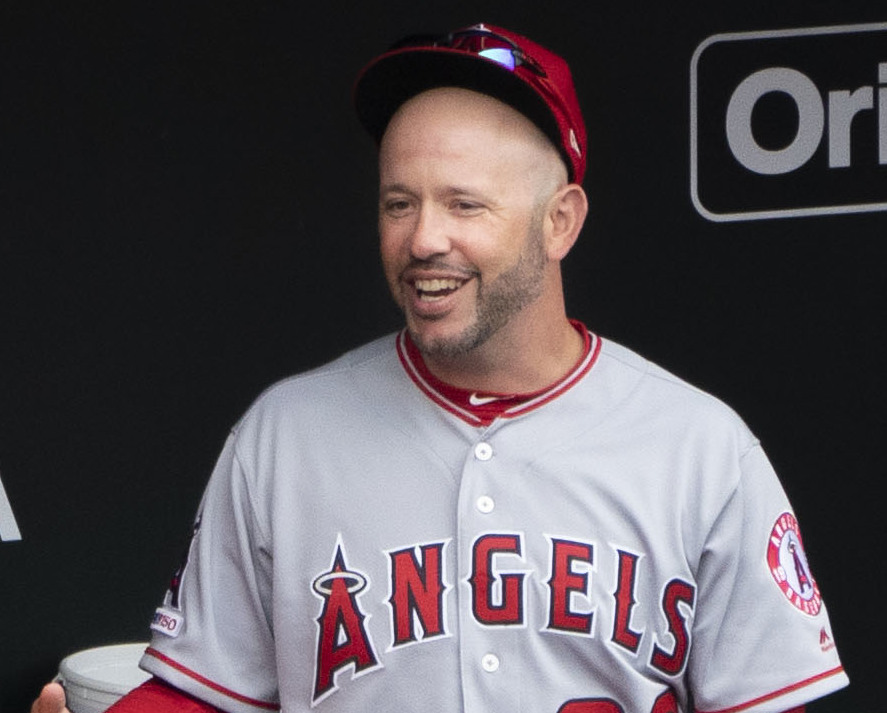
- Feliciano with the Angels in 2019
- Outfielder / Coach
- Born: June 6, 1979 (age 47); Bayamón, Puerto Rico
- Batted: Left Threw: Left

MLB debut
- June 10, 2010, for the New York Mets

Last MLB appearance
- October 3, 2010, for the New York Mets

MLB statistics
- Batting average: .231
- Home runs: 0
- Runs batted in: 3
- Stats at Baseball Reference

Teams
- As player: New York Mets (2010); As coach: Los Angeles Angels (2019–2020)

Member of the Caribbean

Baseball Hall of Fame
- Induction: 2024
Medals
Men's baseball
Representing Puerto Rico
World Baseball Classic
Silver medal – second place	2013 San Francisco	Team

Jesús Feliciano (born June 6, 1979) is a Puerto Rican former professional baseball outfielder and coach. He most recently served as the first base coach for the Los Angeles Angels of the Major League Baseball (MLB). He played in MLB for the New York Mets.

== Professional career ==
=== Los Angeles Dodgers ===
Feliciano was originally picked in the 36th round of the 1997 Major League Baseball draft by the Los Angeles Dodgers as a draft-and-follow player. He signed in May 1998 and debuted as a professional with the short-season Yakima Bears that summer. He batted .305 with 26 RBI, and stole 34 bases in 44 attempts in 77 games, finishing four steals behind Northwest League leader Juan Pierre. Feliciano led the Northwest League in at-bats with 302, outfield putouts with 191, and outfield double plays.

In 1999, Feliciano played for the Advanced-A Vero Beach Dodgers and he stole 20 bases in 30 tries. He played for the Class-A Advanced San Bernardino Stampede in 2000 and batted .289, stealing 31 bases while being caught 11 times. He fielded .996, leading California League outfielders.

Feliciano spent 2001 back at Vero Beach and hit .262, stealing 22 bases in 32 attempts. Feliciano again led his league's outfielders in fielding percentage, this time handling 284 chances without an error.

Feliciano struggled in 2002 playing for the Jacksonville Suns, only batting .237 in 100 games. He hit .300 that winter for the Cangrejeros de Santurce in the Puerto Rico Baseball League.

He began 2003 even worse than he had done in the summer of '02, hitting .138 and 4 RBI in 37 games. He was released by Dodgers on May 29.

=== Tampa Bay Devil Rays ===
He later was signed by the Tampa Bay Devil Rays where he played in 72 games for the Double-A Orlando Rays. He also played for Montgomery Biscuits and in 68 games for the High Class-A Bakersfield Blaze.

=== Washington Nationals ===
He was signed by the Washington Nationals organization and played for the Harrisburg Senators. He also spent time with the Oaxaca Warriors in the Mexican League.

=== New York Mets ===
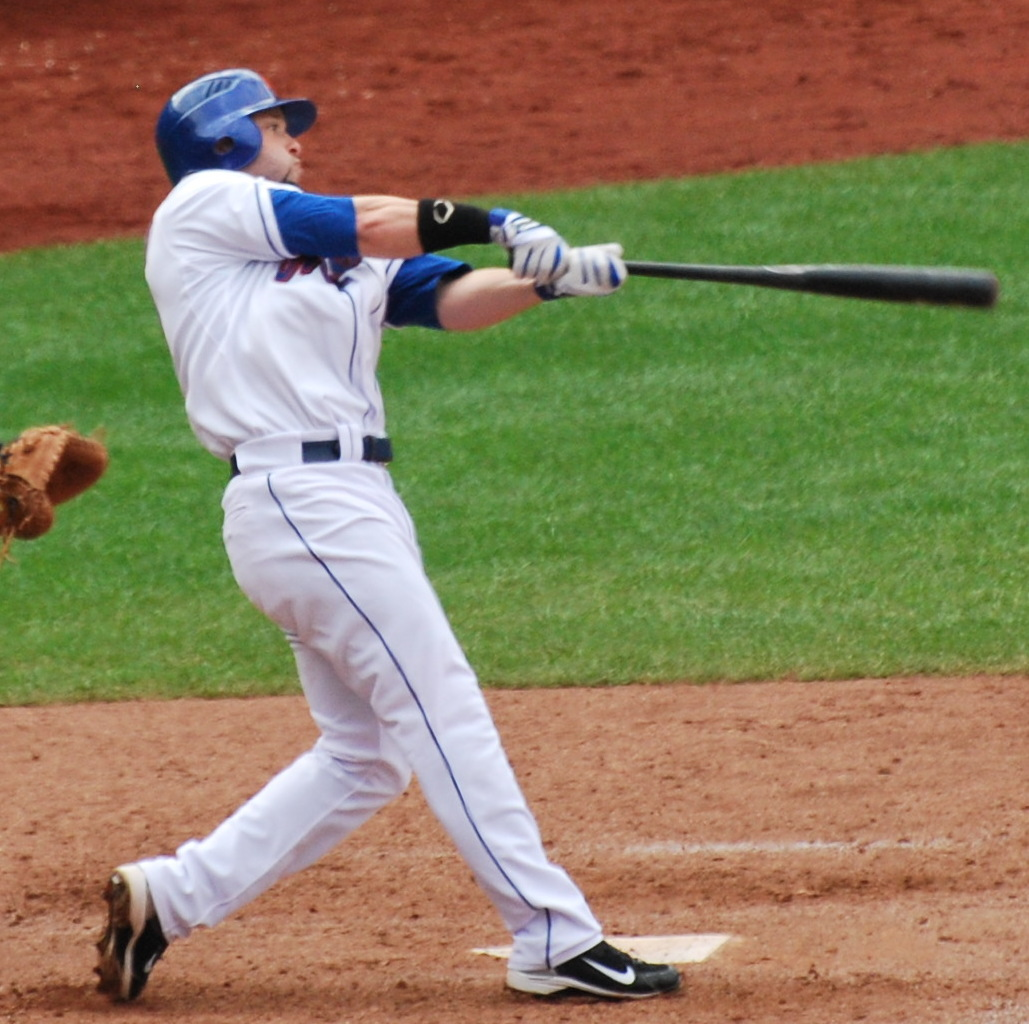
Feliciano with the New York Mets in 2010

On June 7, 2010, the New York Mets selected the contract of the 31-year-old outfielder. He went to Puerto Rico to play against the Florida Marlins in a three-game series. He had been leading the International League in hitting with a batting average of .385. On July 12, he was demoted for the return of the injured Carlos Beltrán. On August 22, 2010, he was called up from the Triple-A Buffalo Bisons to take the place of Rod Barajas.

When the Mets traded Jeff Francoeur to the Texas Rangers, Jesus was sent down to the Minors again to make room for rookie outfielder Lucas Duda.

On November 5, 2010, Feliciano was sent down to the minors to the Triple-A Buffalo Bisons, then became a free agent after refusing the minor league assignment.

=== Tampa Bay Rays ===
The Tampa Bay Rays signed Feliciano to a minor league contract on January 19, 2012.

== International career ==
=== Caribbean Series ===
In the 2009 Caribbean Series, he played for the Leones de Ponce.

=== Puerto Rico Winter League ===
In the 2009–2010 season he played with the Lobos de Arecibo. In the 2011–2012 season he played with the league champions Indios de Mayagüez.

=== World Baseball Classic ===
He was selected to play on the Puerto Rican national team for the 2009 World Baseball Classic, where he was the starting left fielder alongside major leaguers Carlos Beltrán and Alex Ríos.

== Coaching career ==
He joined the Chicago Cubs organization after retiring and replaced Bill Buckner as hitting coach for the Boise Hawks in 2014. He was the hitting coach for the South Bend Cubs in 2015. He served as the Eugene Emeralds manager in 2016 and 2017. He led his club to the Northwest League championship in 2016 and won the 2016 Northwest League Manager of the Year Award. He served as hitting coach for the Tennessee Smokies in 2018.

Prior to the 2019 season, he was hired by the Los Angeles Angels as their first base and outfield coach. On December 20, 2020, it was announced that Feliciano would not return to the Angels coaching staff in 2021.

== See also ==
- List of Major League Baseball players from Puerto Rico
