= Guy Morrison =

American baseball player (1895-1934)

- Pitcher
- Born: August 29, 1895; Hinton, West Virginia, U.S.
- Died: August 14, 1934 (aged 38); Grand Rapids, Michigan, U.S.
- Batted: Right Threw: Right

MLB debut
- August 31, 1927, for the Boston Braves

Last MLB appearance
- April 27, 1928, for the Boston Braves

MLB statistics
- Earned run average: 5.06
- Hits: 1
- Runs: 1
- Games started: 3
- Wins: 1
- Losses: 2
- Stats at Baseball Reference

Teams
- Boston Braves (1927–1928)

Walter Guy Morrison (August 29, 1895 – August 14, 1934) was an American professional baseball player. He played briefly in the majors for the Boston Braves in 1927 and 1928. He also served as the baseball and football coach at Montclair State University in 1929. He died of a self-inflicted gunshot wound in 1934.

== Minor leagues ==
Morrison began his career in 1920 with the Evansville Evas. He would play for the Evas, Bloomington Bloomers, Decatur Commodores, Bloomington Cubs and Peoria Tractors of the Illinois–Indiana–Iowa League. He also played for the Providence Grays and Waterbury Brasscos of the Eastern League. In 1923, he played for the San Antonio Bears of the Texas League. In 1926 he played for the Idaho Falls Spuds of the Utah–Idaho League.

== Role in the NFL ==
In 1921, Morrison signed an agreement with Frank Fausch, the owner of the Evansville Crimson Giants of the National Football League. The two arranged for a benefit game that would provide funds for the construction of a World War I veterans' memorial. Immediately the Giants secured the exclusive use of the only suitable stadium in Evansville, Bosse Field. As a result, Fausch's team became the only pro football team in Evansville, as the semi-pro Evansville Ex-Collegians were forced to join the Crimson Giants.

== College football ==
Morrison was the first head coach in Montclair State University's history. He coached for two seasons, 1928 and 1929, compiling a 2–7–1 overall record.

== Head coaching record ==
Year	Team	Overall	Conference	Standing	Bowl/playoffs
Montclair State Indians (Independent) (1928–1929)
1928	Montclair State	0–4			
1929	Montclair State	2–3–1			
Montclair State:		2–7–1			
Total:		2–7–1			
