= Harry Rosenberg =

American baseball player (1908-1997)

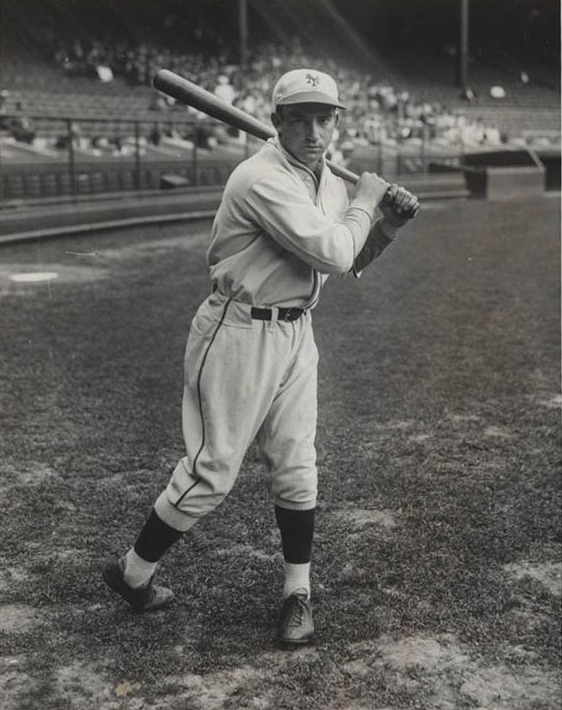
- Outfielder
- Born: June 22, 1908; San Francisco, California, U.S.
- Died: April 13, 1997 (aged 88); San Francisco, California, U.S.
- Batted: Right Threw: Right

MLB debut
- July 15, 1930, for the New York Giants

Last MLB appearance
- September 20, 1930, for the New York Giants

MLB statistics
- At bats: 5
- Runs scored: 1
- Hits: 0
- Stats at Baseball Reference

Teams
- New York Giants (1930)

Harry Rosenberg (June 22, 1908 – April 13, 1997) was an American professional baseball player whose career spanned 13 seasons, one of which was spent in Major League Baseball (MLB) with the New York Giants (1930). In the majors, he played nine games, getting five at-bats, one run scored, one base on balls, and four strikeouts. The majority of his baseball career was spent as an outfielder in the minor leagues.

In the minors, Rosenberg played with the Mission Reds (1930, 1936–37), Bridgeport Bears (1931), Newark Bears (1931), Indianapolis Indians (1931–34), Fort Worth Cats (1933), Sacramento Senators (1935), Portland Beavers (1938–1940), Hollywood Stars (1941), and San Francisco Seals (1943). Over his minor league career, he compiled a .326 batting average with 2,062 hits, 356 doubles, 103 triples, and 68 home runs in 1,720 games played. During his playing career, he stood at 5 feet 10 inches (178 cm) and weighed in at 180 pounds (82 kg). His brother, Lou Rosenberg, was also an MLB player.

== Early life ==
Rosenberg was born on June 22, 1908, in San Francisco to Benjamin and Dora Rosenberg, both of Suwałki, Poland, and was Jewish. Harry Rosenberg had eight siblings; sisters Celia, Dora, and Lottie; and brothers Louis, Max, Meyer, Hyman and Samuel. Their father worked as a contractor in the San Francisco Bay Area. Harry attended Mission High School in San Francisco. Harry Rosenberg's brother, Louis, was a Major League Baseball (MLB) player with the Chicago White Sox. After his baseball career, Harry Rosenberg was a shovel operator for a San Francisco construction company.

== Professional career ==
=== Early career and New York Giants ===
In 1929, Rosenberg played for in the California Winter League. Rosenberg signed with the Double-A Mission Reds of the Pacific Coast League (PCL) in 1930. The Deming Headlight described Rosenberg's play in the PCL as "the quickest rise to fame of any player in the Pacific Coast League in years". After 32 games with the Reds, he batted .500. His complete batting average with the Reds was .368 with 88 hits, 19 doubles, two triples, and 11 home runs in 70 games played. In June, Dick Kinsella, a scout for the New York Giants, advised manager John McGraw to sign Rosenberg, which he did for a price of US$25,000–US$40,000. Mission also received two players from the Giants as compensation. Rosenberg held-out when the Giants called for him to report because he claimed the team owed him a US$5,000 bonus. The Giants eventually played him and he reported. On July 15, 1930, Rosenberg made his MLB debut with the Giants against the Cincinnati Reds. In that game, he made two plate appearances, getting one walk. In nine games with the Giants, he never got a hit. In those games, he had five at-bats, striking out four times. Defensively, he played two games in center field, and one game in right field. His last MLB game would prove to be on September 20, 1930, against Cincinnati.

Before the 1931 season, the New York Giants gave Rosenberg a US$250 a month raise to go with his US$750 a month salary. The reason for the salary increase, it was announced, was due to Rosenberg's appeal to the Jewish community in New York City. He attended spring training with the Giants that year. However, he spent the entire season in the minor leagues. With the Class-A Bridgeport Bears of the Eastern League, he batted .329 with 91 hits, 17 doubles, nine triples, and two home runs in 71 games played. From there, Rosenberg was promoted to the Double-A Newark Bears of the International League, where he batted .284 with 19 hits, three doubles, and one triple in 21 games played. The Giants also farmed Rosenberg to the Double-A Indianapolis Indians of the American Association. With the Indians, he batted .330 with 37 hits, 10 doubles, and one triple in 35 games played. Between the three teams, he made 12 errors in the outfield.

=== Indianapolis Indians ===
After the 1931 season, the Giants traded Rosenberg, along with Jack Berly, Johnny Cooney, and Joe Heving to the Double-A Indianapolis Indians in exchange for Len Koenecke. Rosenberg spent the entire 1932 season with the Indians. He batted .318 with 164 hits, 27 doubles, six triples, and seven home runs in 144 games played. In the field, he committed seven errors in 309 total chances. In 1933, he split the season with the Indians and the Class-A Fort Worth Cats of the Texas League. With Indianapolis, he batted .281 with 41 hits, eight doubles, two triples, and two home runs in 44 games played. In 75 games with Fort Worth, he batted .325 with 89 hits, 17 doubles, seven triples, and four home runs. Combined between the two clubs that year, Rosenberg committed eight errors in 240 total chances. In 1934, Rosenberg spent his final season with the Indians. He batted .329 with 148 hits, 18 doubles, 11 triples, and two home runs in 126 games played. He committed 11 errors in 269 total chances as an outfielder that year.

=== Return to the Pacific Coast League ===
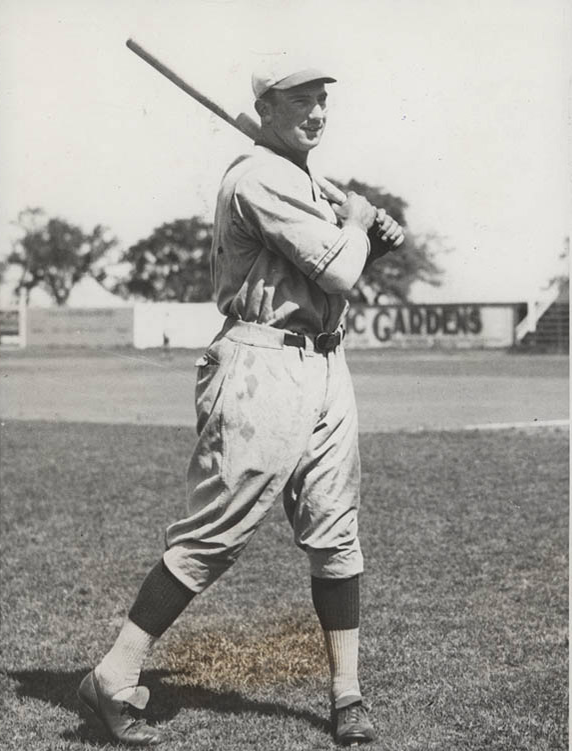
Harry Rosenberg as a member of the Mission Reds.

In December 1934, the Indians sold Rosenberg to the Double-A Sacramento Senators of the PCL. Sacramento were affiliated with the Brooklyn Dodgers in 1935, making Rosenberg a member of their minor league organization. That season, he batted .354 with 201 hits, 27 doubles, 16 triples, and 10 home runs in 151 games played. He was tied for third in the PCL that season in triples, and was eighth in batting average. In the field, he had a .981 fielding percentage. The Sacramento Senators sold Rosenberg to the Mission Reds in November 1935 due to financial restrictions. Before the 1936 season, Rosenberg played a charity game in San Francisco, which benefited semi-professional baseball players who sustained injuries on the field. In his first season with the Reds, he batted .334 with 223 hits, 33 doubles, 15 triples, and three home runs in 172 games played. Rosenberg was second in the PCL in triples that season. He was also fourth in hits, and ninth in total bases (295). In the field, he compiled a .983 fielding percentage. During the 1937 season, Rosenberg batted .330 with 202 hits, 32 doubles, 11 triples, and 10 home runs in 162 games played. He was tied for fourth in the PCL in batting average, and ninth in hits. Defensively, he compiled a .969 fielding percentage in the outfield.

Rosenberg was traded to the Portland Beavers PCL franchise before the 1938 season by the Hollywood Stars, formerly the Mission Reds, in exchange for Tommy Thompson. In his first season with Portland, he batted .320 with 184 hits, 37 doubles, eight doubles, and four home runs in 154 games played. Rosenberg had a .286 fielding percentage that season, which would later prove to be a career high. Before the start of the 1939 season, he was dubbed a holdout for not signing his contract with Portland. Rosenberg eventually signed with the Beavers, and compiled a batting average .331 with 214 hits, 45 doubles, five triples, and eight home runs in 172 games played. He was fourth in the PCL in hits, fifth in doubles, and tenth in total bases. Rosenberg spent his final season with the Beavers in 1940. He batted .314 with 207 hits, 28 doubles, six triples, and four home runs in 177 games played on the season. He was sixth in the league that year in hits. He a .976 fielding percentage.

In 1941, the Hollywood Stars purchased Rosenberg from the Portland Beavers. He was selected to the 1941 PCL All-Star Game. That season, he batted .286 with 58 runs scored, 120 hits, 31 doubles, two triples, one home run, 55 runs batted in (RBIs), and nine stolen bases in 120 games played. As an outfielder, he committed six errors in 124 total chances. He did not play professional baseball in 1942. Before the 1943 season, Rosenberg signed with the Double-A San Francisco Seals of the PCL. On the year, he batted .362 with 11 runs scored, 34 hits, four doubles, one triple, and 18 RBIs in 26 games played. In 1944, he was diagnosed with what was reported as being a "minor chronic disorder" which caused him to need surgery. Later that year, Rosenberg announced that due to the time-consuming day-to-day operations of his trucking business, he would not be able return to the Seals, although he wished to.

== Later life ==
Other than playing professional baseball, Rosenberg was a union hoisting engineer. After his baseball career, he continued to live in San Francisco with his wife. Rosenberg served in the United States Army from 1944 to 1945 in the latter part of World War II. He died on April 13, 1997, in San Francisco. He was buried at Hills of Eternity Memorial in San Francisco.
