= Brigham City (baseball) =

Brigham City "Peaches"
- 1921; Brigham City, Utah

Minor league affiliations
- Class: Class D (1921)
- League: Northern Utah League (1921)

Major league affiliations
- Team: None

Minor league titles
- League titles (1): 1921
- Division titles (1): 1921

Team data
- Name: Brigham City Peaches (1921)
- Ballpark: Unknown (1921)

The Brigham City team was a minor league baseball team based in Brigham City, Utah in 1921. Brigham City was noted to have used the "Peaches" moniker as the team played as a member of the Class D level Northern Utah League in 1921, winning the league championship.

== History ==
Brigham City was a charter member of the Northern Utah League. The league first began play in the 1921 season as a six–team Class D level minor league. The Northern Utah League's charter franchises were based in Brigham City, Lewiston, Idaho (Lewiston Broncs), Logan, Utah (Logan Collegians), Ogden, Utah (Ogden), Smithfield, Utah (Smithfield (baseball)|Smithfield) and Tremonton, Utah (Tremonton) in the newly formed league.

Multiple reports and a team photograph reference the 1921 Brigham City moniker as the "Peaches."

The "Peaches" moniker corresponds to local industry, agriculture and culture. Since 1905, the city has hosted an annual "Brigham City Peach Days."

Brigham City began play as members of the Northern Utah League on May 4, 1921. The Northern Utah League played a split season schedule. The second half began on July 4, 1921. The six–team league overall standings in database references consisted of Brigham City (7–9), the Lewiston Broncs (4–11), Logan Collegians (8–9), Ogden (11–5), Smithfield (6–10) and Tremonton (12–4). With their 12–4 record, Tremonton had the best record in the league. Records differ and it was reported that Brigham City won the first half standings with a 12–8 record and Tremonton finished 15–5 tied with Ogden and won a playoff to win the second half standings. Brigham city was credited with an 8–12 second half record to finish 4th.

Records conflict, but the "1921 Northern Utah League Summary" by Ray Olson, the league secretary, has the Brigham City "Peaches" winning the overall championship after winning the first half with a 12–4 record. In the summary, Tremonton won the second half after beating Ogden in a three–game playoff series. In the championship series for the league title, the Brigham Peaches reportedly defeated the Tremonton "Bears" 3 games to 2 to win the league championship.

The Northern Utah League permanently folded as a minor league following the 1921 season. Brigham City, Utah has not hosted another minor league team. The Brigham City Peaches continued play in the many decades to follow, playing under the moniker as a semi-professional team and collegiate summer baseball team.

== The ballpark ==
The exact name the Brigham City 1921 minor league home ballpark is unknown.

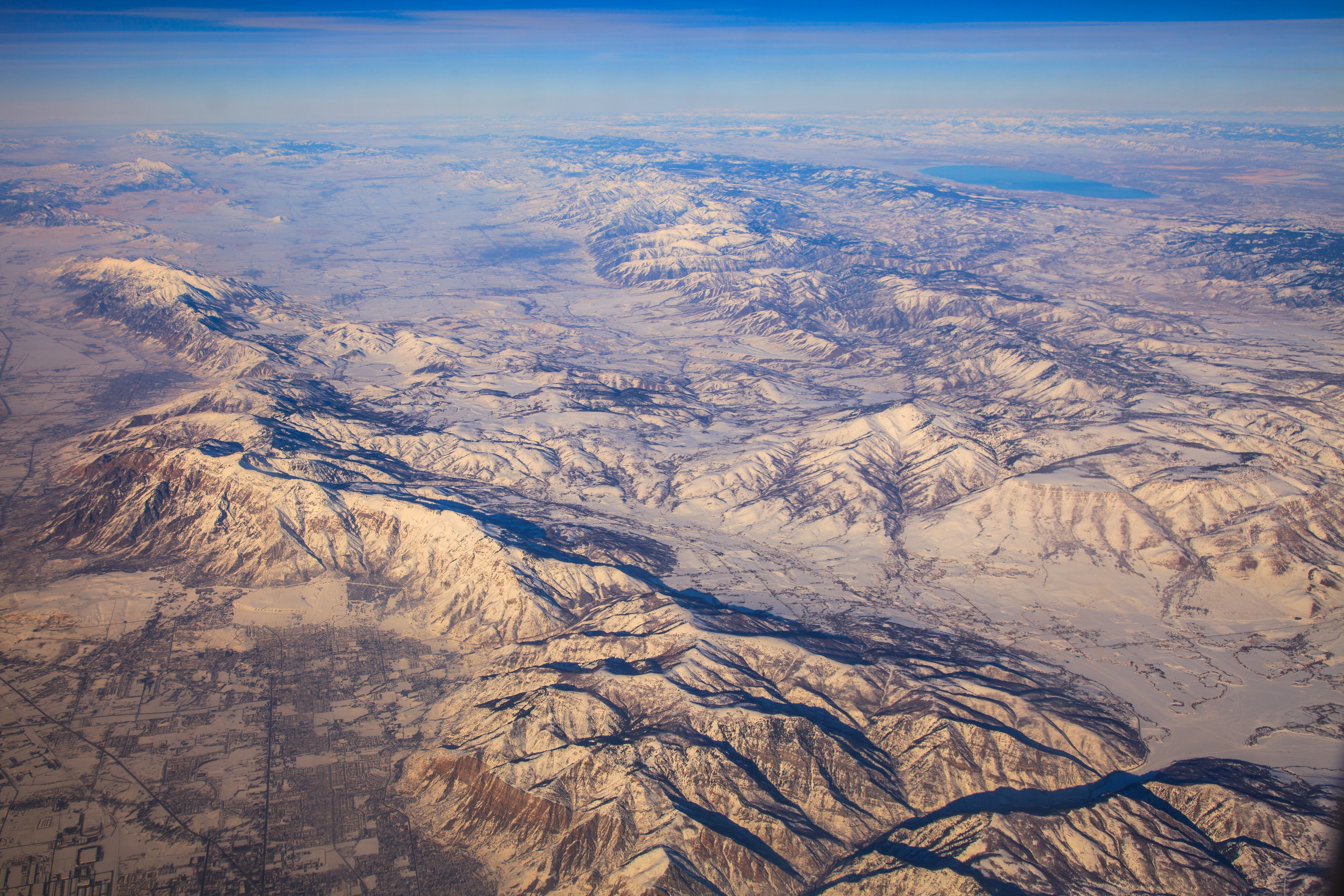
Brigham City, Utah, looking North to Box Elder Peak

== Year–by–year record ==
Year	Record	Finish	Manager	Playoffs/Notes
1921	7–9*	3rd	NA	League champions

== Notable alumni ==
No members of the 1921 Brigham City team reached the major leagues.
