= Utah–Idaho League =

- Classification: Class C (1926–1928)
- Sport: Minor League Baseball
- First season: 1926
- Folded: 1928
- President: Fred M. Nye (1926–1928)
- No. of teams: 7
- Country: United States of America
- Most titles: 2 Idaho Falls Spuds (1926–1927)
- Related competitions: Pacific Coast League

The Utah–Idaho League was a minor league baseball organization founded in 1926. Playing as a six–team, Class C level league for its duration, the Utah–Idaho League franchises were based exclusively in Idaho and Utah as the name indicates.

== History ==
Fred M. Nye served as president of the Utah–Idaho League for its duration. The Pacific Coast League used the Utah-Idaho for player development. Travel costs in the mountainous territory plagued the league and it permanently folded following the 1928 season. Baseball Hall of Fame members Lefty Gomez, 1928 Salt Lake City Bees and Ernie Lombardi, 1927 Ogden Gunners played in the Utah–Idaho League.

== 1926–1928 Utah–Idaho League teams ==
Team name	City represented	Ballpark	Year(s) active
Boise Senators	Boise, Idaho	Public School Field	1928
Idaho Falls Spuds	Idaho Falls, Idaho	Highland Park	1926 to 1928
Logan Collegians	Logan, Utah	Crimson Field	1926 to 1927
Ogden Gunners	Ogden, Utah	Lorin Farr Park	1926 to 1928
Pocatello Bannocks	Pocatello, Idaho	Overland Park	1926 to 1928
Salt Lake City Bees	Salt Lake City, Utah	Bonneville Park /Derks Field	1926 to 1928
Twin Falls Bruins	Twin Falls, Idaho	Athletic Park	1926 to 1928

== Standings & statistics ==
1926 Utah–Idaho League

Team	W	L	Pct.	GB	Manager
Idaho Falls Spuds	75	39	.658	–	Bill Leard / Danny Collins
Twin Falls Bruins	63	50	.558	11.5	Carl Zamlock
Pocatello Bannocks	58	53	.523	15.5	Al Bonner / Bert McIvor / Doug Taitt
Logan Collegians	48	65	.425	26.5	Harry Wolter / Nick Williams / Nate Shandling
Salt Lake City Bees	52	70	.426	27.0	Bud Orr / Bert Whaling / Chet Chadbourne
Ogden Gunners	46	65	.414	27.5	Ray Bates / Dad Gimlin / Guy Cooper

No playoffs scheduled.

Player statistics
Player	Team	Stat	Tot	Player	Team	Stat	Tot
Charles King	Logan	BA	.402	Robert Hurst	Idaho Falls	W	22
Roy Johnson	Idaho Falls	Runs	133	Bruce Cunningham	Pocatello	SO	140
Eddie Rose	Idaho Falls	Hits	177	Guy Morrison	Idaho Falls	ERA	2.83
Larman Cox	Ogden	HR	20				

1927 Utah–Idaho League

Team	W	L	Pct.	GB	Manager
Ogden Gunners	58	45	.563	–	Art Murphy / Del Baker
Salt Lake City Bees	59	50	.541	2.0	Harry O'Neill
Idaho Falls Spuds	52	47	.525	4.0	Dan O'Leary
Logan Collegians	49	51	.490	7.5	Harry Wolter
Pocatello Bannocks	48	50	.490	7.5	Ivy Olson
Twin Falls Bruins	40	63	.388	18.0	Curly Gardiner / Bill Leard

Playoff: Idaho Falls 4 games, Pocatello 3.

Player statistics
Player	Team	Stat	Tot	Player	Team	Stat	Tot
Wally Berger	Pocatello	BA	.385	George Hollerson	Salt Lake City	W	18
John Schinski	Logan	Runs	93	Dave Salazar	Pocatello	SO	129
R. Dennis Gearron	Logan	Runs	93	George Hollerson	Salt Lake City	ERA	2.52
Ira Caffey	Salt Lake City	Hits	152				
Wally Berger	Pocatello	HR	24				

1928 Utah–Idaho League

Team	W	L	Pct.	GB	Manager
Salt Lake City Bees	68	49	.581	–	Bobby Coltrin
Boise Senators	60	55	.522	7.0	Harry O'Neill
Pocatello Bannocks	57	58	.496	10.0	Jack Roche
Ogden Gunners	57	59	.491	10.5	Del Baker
Twin Falls Bruins	29	29	.500	NA	Bill Leard
Idaho Falls Spuds	17	38	.309	NA	Pete Maloney

Twin Falls & Idaho Falls disbanded July 5
Playoff: Salt Lake City 4 games, Boise 1.

Player statistics
Player	Team	Stat	Tot	Player	Team	Stat	Tot
Ed Coleman	Boise/Twin	BA	.385	Val Glynn	Salt Lake City	W	16
Arthur Parker	Pocatello	Runs	111	Curt Davis	Salt Lake City	W	16
Ed Coleman	Boise/Twin	Hits	167	George Hollerson	Boise	W	16
Ed Coleman	Boise/Twin	HR	26	Lefty Gomez	Salt Lake City	SO	172
George Hollerson	Boise	ERA	3.34				

== Sources ==
The Encyclopedia of Minor League Baseball, Second Edition.
