= Bill Brenzel =

American baseball player (1910–1979)

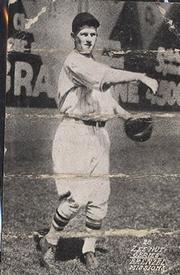
- Catcher
- Born: March 3, 1910; Oakland, California, U.S.
- Died: June 12, 1979 (aged 69); Oakland, California, U.S.
- Batted: Right Threw: Right

MLB debut
- April 13, 1932, for the Pittsburgh Pirates

Last MLB appearance
- September 28, 1935, for the Cleveland Indians

MLB statistics
- Batting average: .198
- Hits: 43
- RBI: 19
- Stats at Baseball Reference

Teams
- Pittsburgh Pirates (1932); Cleveland Indians (1934–1935)

William Richard Brenzel (March 3, 1910 – June 12, 1979) was an American Major League Baseball catcher who played three seasons for the Pittsburgh Pirates and Cleveland Indians where he earned a reputation for his quick wit and his slow feet. After his playing career ended, he was a longtime scout for the Los Angeles Dodgers.
