= Melaleuca Field =

Stadium in the western United States

- Location in the United States Location in Idaho
- Interactive map of Melaleuca Field
- Address: 568 West Elva
- Location: Idaho Falls, Idaho
- Coordinates: 43.505°N 112.038°W
- Elevation: 4,700 ft (1,435 m) AMSL
- Owner: Elmore Sports Group
- Operator: Elmore Sports Group
- Capacity: 3,400
- Surface: Natural Grass
- Field size: Left field: 350 ft (104 m); Center field: 390 ft (122 m); Right field: 335 ft (107 m)

Construction
- Groundbreaking: October 2006
- Opened: June 22, 2007; 19 years ago
- Cost: $5.6 million ($8.7 million in 2025 dollars)
- Architects: Nielson, Bodily and Associates
- Structural engineer: ES2 Structural Engineers
- Services engineers: Havlovick Engineering Services, Inc.
- General contractors: Bateman-Hall, Inc.

Tenant
- Idaho Falls Chukars (PL) 2007–present

Melaleuca Field is a stadium in the western United States, located in Idaho Falls, Idaho. Primarily a baseball park, it is the home field of the Idaho Falls Chukars independent Minor League Baseball team and was built during the Pioneer League 2006–07 offseason. American Legion and local high school games are also played at the field.

The current facility occupies the footprint of the longtime home of the Chukars and their predecessors in Idaho Falls, McDermott Field. It opened in 1940 as Highland Park and was heavily renovated after a 1975 fire. In 1977, it was renamed in honor of E. F. McDermott, a local newspaper publisher known as "Mr. Baseball" in eastern Idaho. However, by 2004, McDermott Field was outdated, deteriorating, and well past the end of its useful life as a baseball venue. In May of that year, the Chukars approached the City of Idaho Falls about a major renovation; the estimated cost was $3.35 million. After the city agreed to allocate $2 million toward the project, the Chukars started a "Step Up To The Plate" fundraising campaign to come up with the remaining $1.35 million. Despite a fundraising campaign launched by the city of Idaho Falls, a sharp rise in anticipated construction costs resulted in a budget shortfall of half a million dollars. Idaho Falls multi-level marketing company Melaleuca provided $600,000 to complete the construction.

The old McDermott Field stadium was torn down on October 30, 2006, and the new Melaleuca Field was dedicated on June 22, 2007. The new stadium includes a seating capacity of 3,400, eight luxury boxes, two large concession booths, and a sponsored hot tub on the right field line. Aligned northeast (home plate to second base), the field's elevation is approximately 4,700 feet (1,435 m) above sea level.

== Features ==
The grandstand includes 1,200 box seats, 1,459 bench seats with backs, eight custom suites with balcony seating, a large press box, two large concession booths, a souvenir shop, and various offices. The playing surface is natural Kentucky bluegrass.

The concourse wraps around the playing field with a picnic area on the third base side and a party area with hot tub on the first base side. A separate building next to the field contains two locker rooms and extra storage.

== Awards ==
In 2007, Melaleuca Field was awarded “Best Ballpark Renovation” in the inaugural Ballpark Digest Awards of Distinction. In 2015, the field was selected by fans as the top rookie-level ballpark in Ballpark Digest's Best of the Ballparks contest and was named fourth best rookie-level ballpark by the Digest. On August 14, 2017, Melaleuca Field welcomed the one millionth fan in the new ballpark's history.
