= Spencer Adams =

American baseball player (1898–1970)

- Infielder
- Born: June 21, 1898; Layton, Utah, U.S.
- Died: November 24, 1970 (aged 72); Salt Lake City, Utah, U.S.
- Batted: Left Threw: Right

MLB debut
- May 8, 1923, for the Pittsburgh Pirates

Last MLB appearance
- October 2, 1927, for the St. Louis Browns

MLB statistics
- Batting average: .256
- Home runs: 0
- Runs batted in: 38
- Stats at Baseball Reference

Teams
- Pittsburgh Pirates (1923); Washington Senators (1925); New York Yankees (1926); St. Louis Browns (1927)

Spencer Dewey Adams (June 21, 1898 – November 24, 1970) was an American Major League Baseball player.

== Career ==
He played with the Pittsburgh Pirates in 1923, the Washington Senators in 1925, the New York Yankees in 1926 and the St. Louis Browns in 1927.

Adams played the infield and batted and threw right-handed. He was born in Layton, Utah and died in Salt Lake City, Utah.

After his baseball days, he was a maintenance worker for the Utah State Highway Department.
