= Ed Coleman (baseball) =

American baseball player (1901–1964)

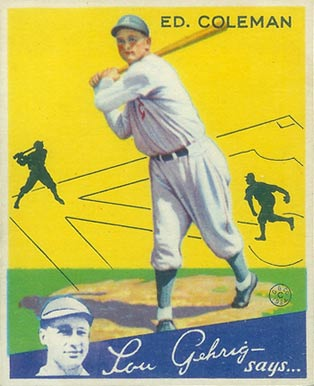
- Ed Coleman 1934 Goudey card
- Right fielder
- Born: December 1, 1901; Canby, Oregon, U.S.
- Died: August 5, 1964 (aged 62); Oregon City, Oregon, U.S.
- Batted: Left Threw: Right

MLB debut
- April 15, 1932, for the Philadelphia Athletics

Last MLB appearance
- September 26, 1936, for the St. Louis Browns

MLB statistics
- Batting average: .285
- Home runs: 40
- Runs batted in: 246
- Stats at Baseball Reference

Teams
- Philadelphia Athletics (1932–1935); St. Louis Browns (1935–1936)

Parke Edward Coleman (December 1, 1901 in Canby, Oregon – August 5, 1964 in Oregon City, Oregon) was a professional baseball player who played Major League Baseball for the Philadelphia Athletics from 1932 to 1935 and the St. Louis Browns from 1935 to 1936. The brother of long-time Oregon State head baseball coach Ralph Coleman, he played in college for Oregon State University and made his major league debut on April 15, 1932.

Coleman was a pinch hitter and, in his role as a substitute batter for the St. Louis Browns during the 1936 season, led the American League in number of times sent in to pinch hit (62 at bats) and in the number of hits as a pinch hitter (20 hits, for a .323 batting average). However, his major league career ended after the 1936 season, despite having a .292 batting average. He did play in the minors from 1937-1941, but injuries did force him to retire from professional baseball in 1941.

In a 5-year, 439 game career, Coleman compiled a .285 batting average (381-for-1337) with 193 runs, 40 home runs and 246 RBI. On August 17, 1934, as a member of the A's, he hit 3 home runs against the White Sox in a 9-8 win.
