= Lewiston Broncs =

Coordinates: 46.409°N 117.012°W

- 1921–1974; (1921, 1937, 1939, 1952–1974); Lewiston, Idaho

Minor league affiliations
- Previous classes: Short-season Class A (1966–1974); Class A (1963–1965); Class B (1937, 1955–1962); Class A (1952–1954); Class C (1939); Class D (1921)
- Previous leagues: Northern Utah League (1921); Western International League(1937); Pioneer League (1939); Northwest League (1955–1974); Western International League (1952–1954)

Major league affiliations
- Previous teams: Oakland Athletics (1973–1974); Baltimore Orioles (1972); Independent (1971); St. Louis Cardinals (1967–1970); Kansas City Athletics (1960–1966); Independent (1958–1959); Philadelphia Phillies (1957); Independent (1955–1956); Baltimore Orioles (1954); St. Louis Browns (1953); Independent (1952)

Minor league titles
- League titles: 3 (1961, 1970, 1972)

Team data
- Previous names: Lewis-Clark Broncs; Lewiston Indians (1939); Lewiston Broncs (1921, 1937, 1952–1974)
- Colors: Royal blue and white
- Previous parks: Bengal Field (1952–1974)
- Owner(s)/ Operator(s): Lewiston Baseball Club, Inc.

The Lewiston Broncs were a minor league baseball team in the northwest United States, based in Lewiston, Idaho, and played from 1952 through 1974. Locally, the team was known as "Lewis-Clark" to include the adjacent twin city of Clarkston, Washington. The team's ballpark was Bengal Field, a few blocks southeast of the high school.

== History ==
The parent organization was Lewiston Baseball Club, Inc., formed in 1952 by Lewiston businessmen Sam Canner Sr., Jack Lee, Billy Gray, George Thiessen, and others. Gray later sold his shares to Thiessen. Prior to its arrival in Lewiston, the team was the Tacoma Tigers, owned by William Starr of San Diego, and were affiliated with the San Diego Padres of the Pacific Coast League (PCL).

The Broncs were a member of the Western International League ("Willy") from 1952–54, and its successor, the Northwest League, from 1955–74. The Broncs won the NWL championships in 1961, led by catcher–manager John McNamara, the future MLB skipper, and again in 1970 and 1972.

The Broncs had two distinctions:

1. They played in the smallest town in America to have a professional baseball team (1960 census = 12,691^); and
2. They were the only professional baseball team to be operated without a business manager. During their entire existence, they were run by a board of directors centered on the stockholders.

The team colors were blue and white and the ballpark was Bengal Field; at 11th Avenue and 14th Street, it is now the football-only venue of Lewiston High School, with a grandstand on its west sideline. When it was a baseball stadium for the Lewiston Broncs, home plate was in the northeast corner of the property at 15th Street, resulting in an unorthodox southwest alignment (home to center field). (The recommended alignment is east-northeast.) LHS played baseball there through 1983.

^ Note: The Orchards area of south Lewiston was unincorporated until late 1969.

== Affiliations ==
The Broncs were affiliated with four major league franchises:

Year	Affiliation
1952	Independent
1953	St. Louis Browns
1954	Baltimore Orioles
1955–56	Independent
1957	Philadelphia Phillies
1958–59	Independent
1960–66	Kansas City Athletics
1967–70	St. Louis Cardinals
1971	Independent
1972	Baltimore Orioles
1973–74	Oakland Athletics

- The St. Louis Browns became the Baltimore Orioles in 1954.
- The Kansas City Athletics moved to Oakland in 1968.

== Players ==
A roster check in 1967 showed that 40% of the players and coaches of the Kansas City Athletics had been in Lewiston at one time or another. Reggie Jackson was perhaps the most famous Lewiston Bronc of all-time; Mr. October played 12 games at age 20 for Lewiston in 1966. which was the first year of the short season for the NWL. The Broncs' rosters included Rick Monday, manager John McNamara, Vearl ("Snag") Moore, Thorton ("Kip") Kipper, Antonio Perez, Ron Koepper, Delmer Owen, Dick Green, Bud Swan, Bert Campaneris, John Israel, Dave Duncan, Al Heist and as a player, later coach-manager Robert ("Gabby") Williams. In 1967, the Broncs started a four-year affiliation with the St. Louis Cardinals, who went to the World Series those first two seasons, both going seven games; they won in 1967, but were a game short in 1968.

== Notable alumni ==
- Reggie Jackson (1966) Inducted Baseball Hall of Fame, 1993
- Tony LaRussa (1964) Inducted Baseball Hall of Fame, 2014
- Jack Aker (1961, 1963)
- Bert Campaneris (1963) 6x MLB All–Star
- Reggie Cleveland (1967)
- Chuck Dobson (1965)
- Dave Duncan (1965) MLB All–Star
- Bob Forsch (1969–1970)
- Dick Green (1961)
- Wayne Gross (1973) MLB All-Star
- Dave Hamilton (1966)
- Ted Kubiak (1963)
- Marcel Lachemann (1964)
- Hillis Layne (1956–1958, MGR)
- Steve McCatty (1973-1974) 1981 AL ERA Leader
- John McNamara (1955)
- Rick Monday (1965) 2x MLB All–Star
- Dwayne Murphy (1973) 6x Gold Glove
- Jim Nash (1965)
- Fred Norman (1962)
- Blue Moon Odom (1965) 2x MLB All–Star
- John O'Donoghue (1960-1961) MLB All–Star
- Tom Trebelhorn (1974)
- Gary Woods (1973)
- Lewiston Broncs players

== Termination ==
The Broncs and their parent company were dissolved in January 1975, after years of financial losses due to poor win–loss records, resulting in low attendance. Micromanagement interference from A's owner Charlie O. Finley, at all levels of the organization, was the cause. The result for the Broncs was lost games due to the best players being quickly moved up to other A's minor league franchises in Single-A (Burlington Bees) and Double-A (Birmingham A's).

The A's maintained a presence in the Northwest League in 1975 with a new franchise in southwestern Idaho as the Boise A's, managed by former Bronc Tom Trebelhorn. After two seasons in Boise at Borah Field, the team moved to Medicine Hat in eastern Alberta in 1977 and joined the Pioneer League. The Medicine Hat A's switched affiliations after one season to become the Medicine Hat Blue Jays in 1978. There was no A's affiliate in the NWL in 1977; in 1978 it was the Bend Timber Hawks, who moved south in 1979 and became the Medford A's.

== Previous teams ==
Prior to the Broncs, Lewiston's first seasons in the minor leagues were in the 1921 Northern Utah League and with teams named the Indians, in the Class B WIL in 1937, and in the Class C Pioneer League in 1939. The first night game at Bengal Field was 89 years ago, the opening game in 1937 on April 27.
