= Canterbury City Council elections =

Local government elections in Kent, England

Canterbury City Council is the local authority for the City of Canterbury. The council is elected every four years.

== Council composition ==
Year	Conservative	Labour	Liberal Democrats (Note: Includes totals for the predecessors of the Liberal Democrats, the Liberal Party and SDP (both of which participated in the Alliance).)	Green	UKIP	Independents & Others	Council control after election
Local government reorganisation; council established (51 seats)
1973	34	7	1	–	–	9	Conservative
1976	46	1	0	0	–	4	Conservative
New ward boundaries (49 seats)
1979	37	6	0	0	–	6	Conservative
1983	37	7	3	0	–	2	Conservative
1987	33	5	11	0	–	0	Conservative
1991	19	7	23	0	–	0	No overall control
1995	10	15	24	0	0	0	No overall control
1999	18	14	17	0	0	0	No overall control
New ward boundaries (50 seats)
2003	24	7	19	0	0	0	No overall control
2007	29	2	19	0	0	0	Conservative
2011	36	3	11	0	0	0	Conservative
New ward boundaries (39 seats)
2015	31	3	3	0	2	0	Conservative
2019	23	10	6	0	0	0	Conservative
2023	8	18	9	4	0	0	No overall control

== Result maps ==
2003 results map

2007 results map

2011 results map

2015 results map

2019 results map

2023 results map

== By-election results ==
=== 1995-1999 ===
Swalecliffe By-Election 3 April 1997
Party	Candidate	Votes	%	±%
Conservative	Ian Thomas	564	35.1	
Liberal Democrats		552	34.4	
Labour		490	30.5	
Majority		12	0.7	
Turnout		1,606	51.0	
Conservative gain from Liberal Democrats		Swing		

Gorrell By-Election 25 September 1997
Party	Candidate	Votes	%	±%
Labour		577	44.1	−12.1
Conservative		567	43.3	+11.3
Liberal Democrats		151	11.5	−0.4
UKIP		14	1.1	+1.1
Majority		10	0.8	
Turnout		1,309		
Labour hold		Swing		

Marshside By-Election 25 September 1997
Party	Candidate	Votes	%	±%
Labour		313	49.8	−13.2
Conservative		183	29.1	+2.0
Liberal Democrats		133	21.1	+13.8
Majority		130	20.7	
Turnout		629		
Labour hold		Swing		

=== 1999-2003 ===
Marshside By-Election 16 March 2000
Party	Candidate	Votes	%	±%
Liberal Democrats	Heather Lloyd	329	38.3	+21.6
Conservative	Elizabeth Taylor	289	33.7	−0.6
Labour	Alan Thomas	241	28.1	−21.0
Majority		40	4.6	
Turnout		859	44.3	
Liberal Democrats gain from Labour		Swing		

Herne By-Election 7 September 2000
Party	Candidate	Votes	%	±%
Liberal Democrats	Nigel Oakes	867	37.6	+5.2
Conservative	Alan White	797	34.5	+9.0
Labour	David Hornsby	344	14.9	−2.6
Green	Carol Davis	187	8.1	−3.0
UKIP	John Moore	112	4.9	+4.9
Majority		70	3.1	
Turnout		2,307	26.8	
Liberal Democrats hold		Swing		

Barton By-Election 7 June 2001
Party	Candidate	Votes	%	±%
Conservative	Michael Northey	1,184	35.4	−2.3
Liberal Democrats	Valerie Ainscough	1,177	35.2	−11.6
Labour	Theresa Mawson	824	24.6	+9.0
Green	Steven Dawe	163	4.9	+4.9
Majority		7	0.2	
Turnout		3,348	62.4	
Conservative gain from Liberal Democrats		Swing		

=== 2003-2007 ===
North Nailbourne By-Election 22 January 2004
Party	Candidate	Votes	%	±%
Conservative	John Anderson	544	50.9	−5.3
Liberal Democrats	Janet Horsley	478	44.7	+0.9
UKIP	John Moore	26	2.4	+2.4
Labour	Paul Todd	21	2.0	+2.0
Majority		66	6.2	
Turnout		1,069	53.0	
Conservative hold		Swing		

Barton By-Election 7 October 2004
Party	Candidate	Votes	%	±%
Conservative	Michael Northey	820	44.8	+10.4
Liberal Democrats	James Flanagan	697	38.0	−4.3
Green	Keith Bothwell	145	7.9	+0.9
Labour	Laurence Ward	100	5.5	−5.1
Council Tax Payers Party	James Cooper	70	3.8	−2.0
Majority		123	6.8	
Turnout		1,832	31.8	
Conservative gain from Liberal Democrats		Swing		

West Bay By-Election 5 May 2005
Party	Candidate	Votes	%	±%
Conservative	Vincent McMahan	1,177	37.6	−13.2
Liberal Democrats	Kevin Sims	992	31.7	+13.5
Labour	Brian Hunter	754	24.1	−6.9
UKIP	John Moore	205	6.6	+6.6
Majority		185	5.9	
Turnout		3,128	67.5	
Conservative hold		Swing		

Sturry South By-Election 29 June 2006
Party	Candidate	Votes	%	±%
Conservative	Heather Taylor	474	52.4	−23.1
Liberal Democrats	David Mummery	318	35.1	+23.3
Labour	Andrew Fenyo	89	9.8	−2.8
Independent	John Moore	24	2.6	+2.6
Majority		156	17.3	
Turnout		905	41.3	
Conservative hold		Swing		

=== 2007-2011 ===
Barton By-Election 10 July 2008
Party	Candidate	Votes	%	±%
Liberal Democrats	Michael Steed	993	51.8	+9.3
Conservative	Mark Evans	701	36.6	+2.7
Green	Keith Bothwell	121	6.3	+6.3
Independent	Blue Cooper	102	5.3	−0.7
Majority		292	15.2	
Turnout		1,917	33.1	
Liberal Democrats hold		Swing		

=== 2011-2015 ===
Blean Forest By-Election 20 September 2012
Party	Candidate	Votes	%	±%
Conservative	Ben Fitter	342	44.2	−7.5
Labour	Carol Goldstein	185	23.9	+23.9
Liberal Democrats	Dan Smith	121	15.6	+0.4
Green	Russell Page	64	8.3	−24.8
UKIP	Howard Farmer	38	4.9	+4.9
Independent	John Hippisley	24	3.1	+3.1
Majority		157	20.3	
Turnout		774		
Conservative hold		Swing		

Seasalter By-Election 2 May 2013
Party	Candidate	Votes	%	±%
Conservative	Louise Morgan	789	38.4	−21.5
UKIP	Howard Farmer	706	34.3	+34.3
Labour	Rachel Goodwin	427	20.8	−6.7
Liberal Democrats	Debra Enever	93	4.5	−8.1
TUSC	Eriks Puce	41	2.0	+2.0
Majority		83	4.0	
Turnout		2,056		
Conservative hold		Swing		

Seasalter By-Election 19 September 2013
Party	Candidate	Votes	%	±%
UKIP	Mike Bull	644	38.5	+38.5
Conservative	Annette Stein	522	31.2	−28.7
Labour	Rachel Goodwin	307	18.3	−9.2
Liberal Democrats	Keith Hooker	147	8.8	−3.8
Green	Russell Page	54	3.2	+3.2
Majority		122	7.3	
Turnout		1,674		
UKIP gain from Conservative		Swing		

Barham Downs By-Election 14 March 2014
Party	Candidate	Votes	%	±%
Liberal Democrats	Michael Sole	337	37.3	−3.4
Conservative	Stuart Walker	285	31.5	−11.4
UKIP	Dave de Boick	164	18.1	+18.1
Labour	David Wilson	78	8.6	+8.6
Green	Pat Marsh	40	4.4	−12.0
Majority		52	5.8	
Turnout		904		
Liberal Democrats gain from Conservative		Swing		

=== 2015-2019 ===
Reculver By-Election 5 May 2016
Party	Candidate	Votes	%	±%
Conservative	Ann Taylor	421	39.3	−31.7
UKIP	Mick O'Brien	306	28.6	+28.6
Labour	Simon Warley	251	23.4	−5.6
Liberal Democrats	Ann Anderson	93	8.7	+8.7
Majority		115	10.7	
Turnout		1,071		
Conservative hold		Swing		

Westgate By-Election 8 June 2017
Party	Candidate	Votes	%	±%
Labour	Simon Warley	1,761	43.4	+24.1
Liberal Democrats	Daniel Prevett	978	24.1	+0.7
Conservative	Luke Whiddett	929	22.9	−3.8
Green	Henry Stanton	389	9.6	−9.8
Majority		783	19.3	
Turnout		4,057		
Labour gain from Conservative		Swing		

=== 2019-2023 ===
Chestfield By-Election 19 September 2019
Party	Candidate	Votes	%	±%
Conservative	Ben Fitter-Harding	728	46.0	−6.5
Liberal Democrats	Peter Old	562	35.5	+18.9
Labour	Morag Warren	140	8.8	−6.9
Independent	Joe Egerton	84	5.3	+5.3
Green	Nicole David	68	4.3	−10.9
Majority		166	10.5	
Turnout		1,582		
Conservative hold		Swing		

Swalecliffe By-Election 6 May 2021
Party	Candidate	Votes	%	±%
Conservative	Mark Dance	616	42.6	−3.7
Green	Keith Bothwell	527	36.5	+20.6
Labour	Craig Potter	278	19.2	−11.6
Independent	Joe Egerton	24	1.7	+1.7
Majority		89	6.2	
Turnout		1,445		
Conservative hold		Swing		

Westgate By-Election 6 May 2021
Party	Candidate	Votes	%	±%
Labour	Pip Hazelton	842	39.2	+5.4
Liberal Democrats	Alex Lister	661	30.8	−6.5
Conservative	Jake Warman	404	18.8	+9.2
Green	Terry Thompson	242	11.3	+2.0
Majority		181	8.4	
Turnout		2,149		
Labour hold		Swing		

Gorrell By-Election 18 November 2021
Party	Candidate	Votes	%	±%
Green	Clare Turnbull	1,149	43.9	+10.3
Labour	Dane Buckman	803	30.7	−6.0
Conservative	Stephen Spencer	608	23.2	+0.2
Workers Party	Colin Gardner	58	2.2	+2.2
Majority		346	13.2	
Turnout		2,618		
Green gain from Labour		Swing		

=== 2023-2027 ===
Gorrell By-Election 6 March 2025
Party	Candidate	Votes	%	±%
Green	Stuart Heaver	1,210	49.5	
Labour	Valerie Kenny	570	23.3	
Reform	Babychan Thomas	423	17.3	
Conservative	Janet Newcombe	179	7.3	
Liberal Democrats	Nick Parry	64	2.6	
Majority		640	26.2	
Turnout		2,446		
Green hold		Swing		

Herne and Broomfield By-Election 6 March 2025
Party	Candidate	Votes	%	±%
Conservative	Grace Paget	557	40.7	
Reform	Mark Mulvihill	473	34.6	
Labour	Lawrence Coomber	196	14.3	
Liberal Democrats	Derek Maslin	102	7.5	
Green	Peter Campbell	41	3.0	
Majority		84	6.1	
Turnout		1,369		
Conservative hold		Swing		

St Stephen's By-Election 6 March 2025
Party	Candidate	Votes	%	±%
Labour	Beth Forrester	628	47.0	
Reform	Colin Spooner	245	18.3	
Liberal Democrats	Christopher Palmer	220	16.5	
Conservative	Arjan Taylor	128	9.6	
Green	Jessie Millner	116	8.7	
Majority		383	28.6	
Turnout		1,337		
Labour hold		Swing		

Wincheap By-Election 13 November 2025
Party	Candidate	Votes	%	±%
Green	Peter Campbell	842	39.1	+24.0
Liberal Democrats	Guy Meurice	518	24.1	−12.2
Reform	Colin Spooner	351	16.3	+16.3
Labour	Jasmin Dallos-Foreman	276	12.8	−25.6
Conservative	Elliot Curryer	166	7.7	−2.6
Majority		324	15.0	
Turnout		2,153		
Green gain from Liberal Democrats		Swing		
