= Warmsley =

Warmsley is a surname. Notable people with the surname include:

- Fred Warmsley (born 1987), American record producer and sound artist
- Jeremy Warmsley, London-based musician and composer
- Julius Warmsley (born 1990), American football defensive end
- Titus Warmsley (born 1977), American professional basketball player

== See also ==
- Warley (disambiguation)
- Warmley
