= Montana State Billings Yellowjackets =

- University: Montana State University Billings
- Conference: GNAC (primary)
- NCAA: Division II
- Athletic director: Michael Bazemore
- Location: Billings, Montana
- Varsity teams: 14
- Basketball arena: Alterowitz Gymnasium
- Baseball stadium: Dehler Park
- Mascot: Buzz
- Nickname: Yellowjackets
- Colors: Navy and gold
- Website: msubsports.com

The Montana State Billings Yellowjackets (also known as MSU Billings Yellowjackets and MSUB Yellowjackets and formerly known as the Eastern Montana Yellowjackets) are the athletic teams that represent Montana State University Billings, located in Billings, Montana, in intercollegiate sports as a member of the NCAA Division II ranks, primarily competing in the Great Northwest Athletic Conference (GNAC) since the 2007–08 academic year. The Yellowjackets previously competed in the D-II Heartland Conference from 2005–06 to 2006–07; in the D-II Pacific West Conference (PacWest; formerly known as the Great Northwest Conference until after the 1991–92 school year) from 1982–83 to 2004–05; as an NCAA D-II Independent from 1980–81 to 1981–82; and in the Frontier Conference of the National Association of Intercollegiate Athletics (NAIA) from 1933–34 to 1979–80.

== Varsity teams ==
MSUB competes in 14 intercollegiate varsity sports: Men's sports include baseball, basketball, cross country, golf, and track & field; while women's sports include basketball, cross country, golf, soccer, softball, track & field, and volleyball; and co-ed sports include cheerleading and stunt. The official MSUB song is the Fight Song. Former sports included football.

=== Men's basketball ===
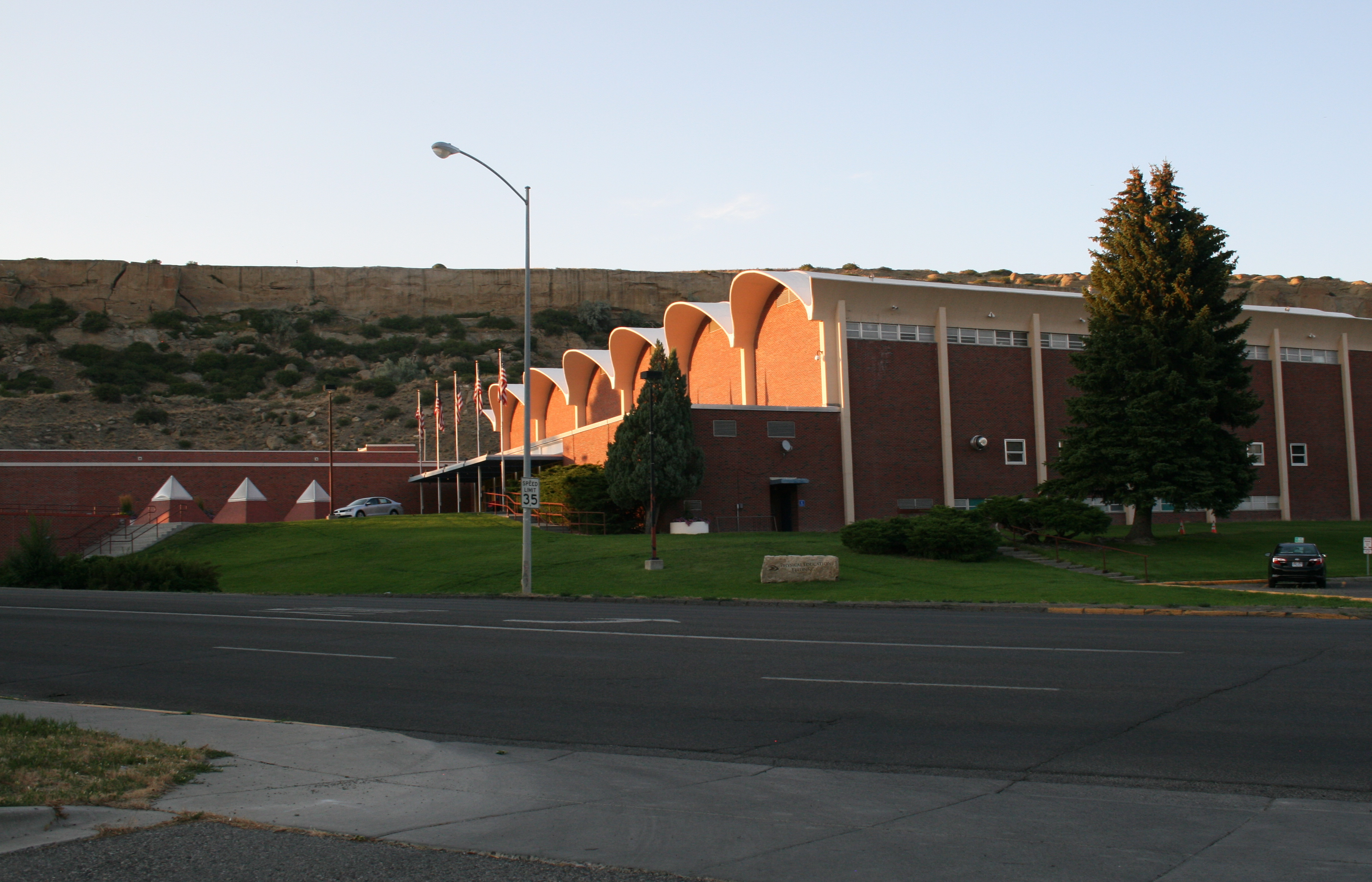
Alterowitz Gymnasium, home to MSU Billings basketball and volleyball teams

The Yellowjackets men's basketball program has been at the forefront of the MSU Billings sports offerings since football was abandoned in the late 1970s.

In 2011–12, the MSUB men's basketball team captured the Great Northwest Athletic Conference Men's Basketball Championship title, defeating the University of Alaska 74–70 to earn the conference's automatic berth into the NCAA Division II tournament.

The program, which rose to prominence during the early 1960s under coach Harry "Mike" Harkins, has lately been competitive within NCAA D–II and while a member of the Great Northwest Athletic Conference (GNAC). In the past ten years the Yellowjackets have led D–II (and in some cases all of the NCAA) in three-pointers made per game.

While Roy McPipe remains the only former player to be drafted by the NBA and play major professional basketball in the United States, many former players including Markus Hallgrimson, Jerett Skrifvars, Titus Warmsley have found pro careers in Europe or in minor leagues in the states.

=== Baseball ===
The Yellowjackets baseball program had originally been dropped in 1974, 5 years before the school moved from NAIA to an NCAA D–II athletics program. The baseball team was re-established in 2006, enjoying its first year ever as an NCAA baseball school under manager Chris Brown in the Heartland Conference.

The 2006 season began on February 24 with a 6–3 loss to Northwest Nazarene University. The Jackets began the year on a 16-game road trip, losing all 16 games. They started the year 0–18 before an 11–2 home win at Cobb Field against the same Northwest Nazarene team. The Jackets finished their first NCAA season on a 15–17 run to finish 15–35. In 2007 the team completed its second season with a much improved 24–26 record.

In 2015, the Yellowjackets posted their first winning season since the program was reintroduced, claiming the GNAC regular season title and hosting the conference championship tournament at Dehler Park in Billings. Head coach Rob Bishop was picked as the GNAC Coach of the Year, as MSUB won 20 of its final 25 conference games and claimed its first-ever conference title with a four-game series sweep of Saint Martin's University on the final weekend of the season.

2015 senior Brody Miller became just the second baseball player in GNAC history to earn GNAC Male Athlete of the Year honors, and he joined MSUB's Bobbi Knudsen (women's basketball) as the only two Yellowjackets to win the conference's top honor for an individual athlete. Miller was a two-time GNAC Player of the Year and two-time All-American.
