= Dehler Park =

Baseball park in Billings, MT

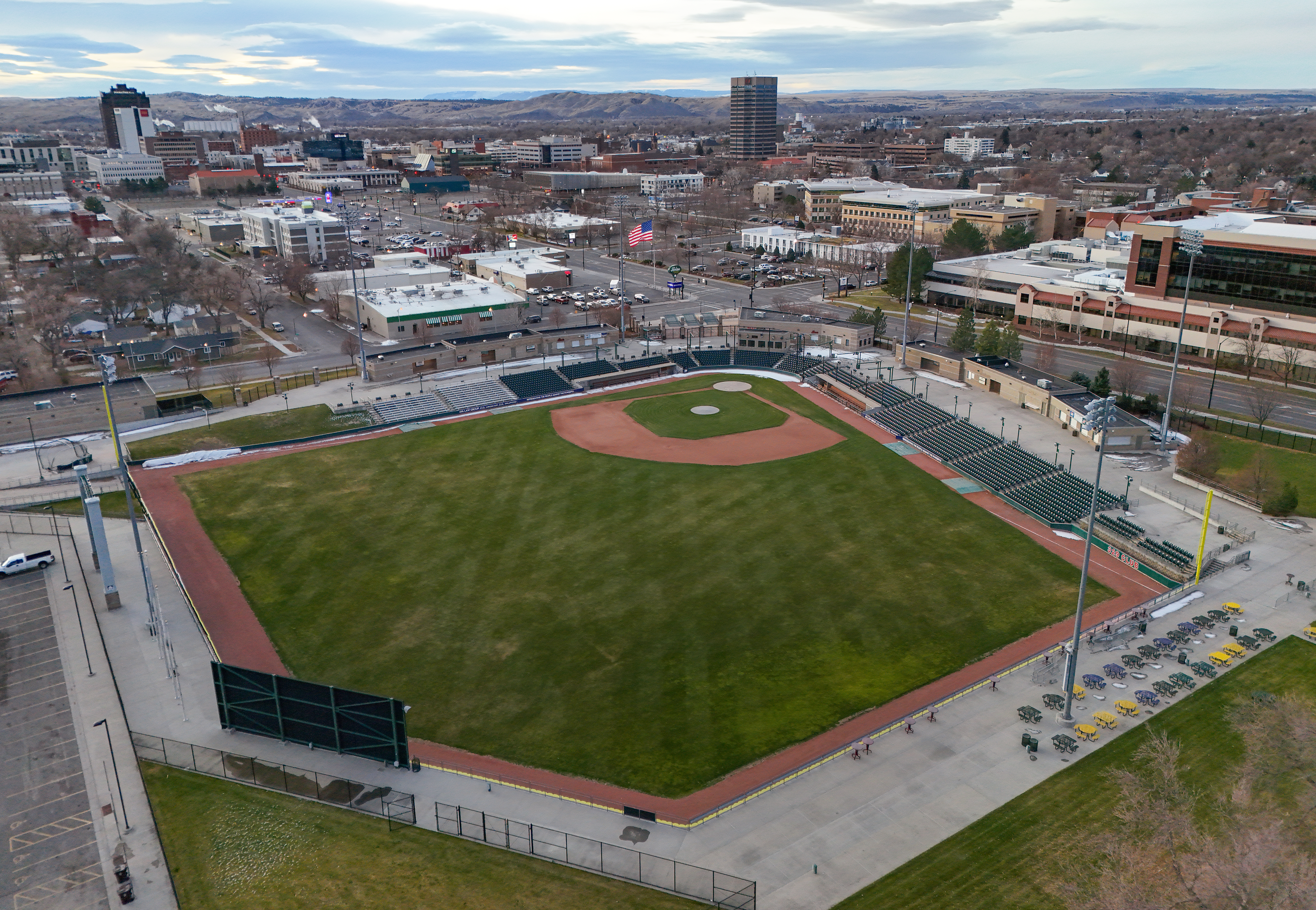
- The stadium in 2024

- Location in the United States Location in Montana
- Interactive map of Dehler Park
- Address: 2611 9th Ave N
- Location: Billings, Montana; United States
- Coordinates: 45°47′25″N 108°30′40″W
- Owner: City of Billings
- Operator: Billings Parks & Recreation
- Capacity: 3,071 (with standing room at least 6,000)
- Surface: Natural grass
- Field size: Left field: 329 feet (100 m); Center field: 410 feet (120 m); Right field: 350 feet (110 m)

Construction
- Groundbreaking: March 22, 2007
- Opened: June 29, 2008; 18 years ago
- Cost: $13.7 Million ($20.5 million in 2025 dollars)
- Architects: HNTB; CTA Architects
- General contractors: Langlas & Associates

Tenants
- Billings Mustangs; Montana State University-Billings (NCAA Baseball); Billings American Legion Baseball

Dehler Park is a multi-use stadium in Billings, Montana. Primarily used for baseball, it is the home of the Billings Mustangs of the independent Pioneer League and the Montana State University Billings Yellowjackets. The ballpark opened in 2008 and has a seating capacity of 3,071. It replaced Cobb Field, a fixture in Billings since the 1930s, and the groundbreaking ceremony took place on March 22, 2007.

First pitch, June 29, 2008

The stadium was named by Billings businessman Jon Dehler, who purchased the naming rights in 2007 to honor his father, Billy Joe Dehler. The park still has part of Cobb Field included, as a section down the right field line includes some of the same bench seating used at the old stadium. Outside of that and the over 2,500+ individual seats are two grass berm areas for picnic seating. Patrons can walk around the entire field thanks to an outfield terrace, which is also home to those who buy a standing room-only ticket. Theoretically, the stadium could feasibly hold well over 6,000 with a large standing room-only crowd. The natural grass field is aligned north by east (home plate to second base) at an approximate elevation of 3,150 feet (960 m) above sea level.

The first event at the stadium was on June 29, 2008, an American Legion game between the Billings Scarlets and Bozeman Bucks. The Bucks led 10–3 when the game was suspended after seven innings due to malfunctions with the lights. It was completed the following night at Pirtz Field, the local Legion ballpark, with the Bucks winning 16–3. The first home run, hit by Matt Comer of the Bucks, was retrieved by a man riding a bicycle outside the stadium. After some speculation as to what would become of the ball, the owner of the ball came forth and agreed to donate the ball to the Billings Parks and Recreation Department for a Dehler Park Hall of Fame display.

On June 30, the park hosted local Little League championship games before the Billings Mustangs and Great Falls Voyagers met in the first professional baseball game at the park on July 1. The Mustangs won a rain-soaked 9–7 game highlighted by a Michael Konstanty grand slam which stands as the first professional homer at the field. Attendance for the game was 3,749.

In 2021, the park was featured in a Geico commercial.

== Notable performers ==
Other uses for the stadium include concerts and plays. Some of the most notable performers at Dehler Park include:

- Bob Dylan and John Mellencamp – August 11, 2010
