= MSUB =

MSUB may refer to:

- Maharaja Sayajirao University of Baroda, Gujarat, India
- Montana State University Billings, Montana, United States
