= 2015 Canterbury City Council election =

2015 UK local government election

| ← 2011 | 7 May 2015 | 2019 → |

All 39 seats in the Canterbury City Council 20 seats needed for a majority
| | First party | Second party |
|---|---|---|
| Party | Conservative | Labour |
| Last election | Conservative |
| Seats won | 31 | 3 |
| Popular vote | 29,670 | 16,954 |
| Percentage | 37.4% | 21.4% |
| | Third party | Fourth party |
| Party | Liberal Democrats | UKIP |
| Seats won | 3 | 2 |
| Popular vote | 10,305 | 12,939 |
| Percentage | 13.0% | 16.3% |
- Map of the results of the 2015 Canterbury council election. Labour in red, Conservatives in blue, Lib Dems in orange and UKIP in purple.
Council control before election
Conservative
Council control after election
Conservative

The 2015 Canterbury City Council election took place on 7 May 2015 to elect members of the Canterbury City Council in Kent, England. This was on the same day as other local elections. It was the first election to be held under new ward boundaries. The Conservative Party retained overall control of the council.

== Election result ==
Canterbury City Council election result 2015
| Party | Seats | Gains | Losses | Net gain/loss | Seats % | Votes % | Votes | +/− |
|---|---|---|---|---|---|---|---|---|
| Conservative | 31 | | | | 79.5 | 38.8 | 55,105 | |
| Labour | 3 | | | | 7.7 | 23.4 | 33,253 | |
| Liberal Democrats | 3 | | | | 7.7 | 13.7 | 19,512 | |
| UKIP | 2 | | | | 5.1 | 13.0 | 18,427 | |
| Green | 0 | | | | 0.0 | 10.6 | 15,004 | |
| TUSC | 0 | | | | 0.0 | 0.2 | 325 | |
| Independent | 0 | | | | 0.0 | 0.3 | 412 | |

== Results by ward ==
=== Barton ===
Location of Barton ward

Barton (3)
| Party | Candidate | Votes | % | ±% |
|---|---|---|---|---|
| Conservative | Louise Jones | 1,255 | | |
| Conservative | Steven Williams | 1,224 | | |
| Conservative | Oliver Fawcett | 1,220 | | |
| Liberal Democrats | Paula Vickers | 1,211 | | |
| Labour | Andrew Ashenhurst | 1,141 | | |
| Labour | David Kyffin | 1,119 | | |
| Labour | David McLellan | 1,012 | | |
| Liberal Democrats | Peter Atkin | 1,009 | | |
| Liberal Democrats | Graham Wood | 863 | | |
| Green | Keith Bothwell | 846 | | |
| Green | Stephen Peckham | 667 | | |
| UKIP | James Cooper | 628 | | |
| UKIP | Carol Riley | 549 | | |
| UKIP | Richard Riley | 487 | | |
| Turnout | | | | |
| Conservative hold | | Swing | | |
| Conservative hold | | Swing | | |
| Conservative hold | | Swing | | |

=== Beltinge ===
Location of Beltinge ward

Beltinge (2)
| Party | Candidate | Votes | % | ±% |
|---|---|---|---|---|
| Conservative | Ian Stockley | 1,946 | | |
| Conservative | Jeanette Stockley | 1,705 | | |
| UKIP | Steven Johnson | 1,429 | | |
| Labour | Christine Wheeldon | 969 | | |
| Labour | Gillian Gower | 866 | | |
| Turnout | | | | |
| Conservative hold | | Swing | | |
| Conservative hold | | Swing | | |

=== Blean Forest ===
Location of Blean Forest ward

Blean Forest (3)
| Party | Candidate | Votes | % | ±% |
|---|---|---|---|---|
| Conservative | Amy Baker | 1,471 | | |
| Conservative | Benjamin Fitter | 1,253 | | |
| Conservative | George Metcalfe | 1,116 | | |
| Labour | Oluwaranti Adeyemi | 834 | | |
| Liberal Democrats | Helen Clark | 812 | | |
| Labour | Gabrielle Holden | 777 | | |
| Labour | Christopher Cornell | 736 | | |
| Liberal Democrats | Sarah Woodbridge | 657 | | |
| Green | David Cocozza | 581 | | |
| Liberal Democrats | William Tilbrook | 581 | | |
| Green | Andrew Goatly | 577 | | |
| Green | Adam Parsons | 395 | | |
| Turnout | | | | |
| Conservative hold | | Swing | | |
| Conservative hold | | Swing | | |
| Conservative hold | | Swing | | |

=== Chartham and Stone Street ===
Location of Chartham and Stone Street ward

Chartham and Stone Street (2)
| Party | Candidate | Votes | % | ±% |
|---|---|---|---|---|
| Conservative | Rosemary Doyle | 1,659 | | |
| Conservative | Robert Thomas | 1,421 | | |
| Liberal Democrats | Donald Ashton | 697 | | |
| UKIP | David Perry | 691 | | |
| Labour | Shirley Sankey | 635 | | |
| Green | Lucia Moorhead | 574 | | |
| Green | Michael Coppin | 561 | | |
| Labour | John Whyte | 527 | | |
| Liberal Democrats | Helen Sole | 498 | | |
| Turnout | | | | |
| Conservative hold | | Swing | | |
| Conservative hold | | Swing | | |

=== Chestfield ===
Location of Chestfield ward

Chestfield (2)
| Party | Candidate | Votes | % | ±% |
|---|---|---|---|---|
| Conservative | Jennifer Samper | 2,342 | | |
| Conservative | Patrick Todd | 2,049 | | |
| UKIP | Brian MacDowall | 925 | | |
| Labour | Philippa Langton | 648 | | |
| Labour | Stephen Furber | 584 | | |
| Liberal Democrats | Ann Anderson | 395 | | |
| Green | Gregory Lawrence | 391 | | |
| Liberal Democrats | Judith Wehner | 289 | | |
| Turnout | | | | |
| Conservative hold | | Swing | | |
| Conservative hold | | Swing | | |

=== Gorrell ===
Location of Gorrell ward

Gorrell (3)
| Party | Candidate | Votes | % | ±% |
|---|---|---|---|---|
| Conservative | Brian Baker | 1,977 | | |
| Conservative | Ashley Clark | 1,848 | | |
| Labour | Bernadette Fisher | 1,844 | | |
| Labour | Peter Halfpenny | 1,658 | | |
| Labour | Pamela O'Brien | 1,638 | | |
| Conservative | Ian Taylor | 1,427 | | |
| UKIP | Nicholas Bond | 1,102 | | |
| Green | Alexander Stevens | 903 | | |
| Green | Thomas Williams | 808 | | |
| Green | Michelle Freeman | 801 | | |
| Liberal Democrats | Guy Voizey | 531 | | |
| Liberal Democrats | Jonathan Dearth | 476 | | |
| Liberal Democrats | Colin Curtis | 451 | | |
| Independent | John Wratten | 412 | | |
| TUSC | Ian Page | 116 | | |
| TUSC | Mary Sullivan | 110 | | |
| TUSC | Delia Hazrati | 99 | | |
| Turnout | | | | |
| Conservative hold | | Swing | | |
| Conservative hold | | Swing | | |
| Labour hold | | Swing | | |

=== Greenhill ===
Location of Greenhill ward

Greenhill (1)
| Party | Candidate | Votes | % | ±% |
|---|---|---|---|---|
| UKIP | David Hirst | 750 | | |
| Conservative | Robert Bright | 708 | | |
| Labour | Roger Dengate | 568 | | |
| Turnout | | | | |
| UKIP hold | | Swing | | |

=== Herne & Broomfield ===
Location of Herne and Broomfield ward

Herne & Broomfield (2)
| Party | Candidate | Votes | % | ±% |
|---|---|---|---|---|
| Conservative | Robert Jones | 2,017 | | |
| Conservative | Sharron Sonnex | 1,739 | | |
| UKIP | John Moore | 1,283 | | |
| UKIP | Stanley Truelove | 998 | | |
| Labour | Barbara Ayling | 699 | | |
| Labour | Glynis Nerssessian | 557 | | |
| Green | Martin Baker | 420 | | |
| Turnout | | | | |
| Conservative hold | | Swing | | |
| Conservative hold | | Swing | | |

=== Heron ===
Location of Heron ward

Heron (3)
| Party | Candidate | Votes | % | ±% |
|---|---|---|---|---|
| Conservative | Andrew Cook | 2,547 | | |
| Conservative | Joseph Howes | 2,065 | | |
| Conservative | David Thomas | 1,982 | | |
| UKIP | Trevor Dockwray | 1,763 | | |
| UKIP | Michael O'Brien | 1,707 | | |
| Labour | Lynnda Faux-Bowyer | 1,235 | | |
| Labour | Thomas Mellish | 1,030 | | |
| Labour | Stanley Wilson | 899 | | |
| Liberal Democrats | Kenwyn Hando | 707 | | |
| Green | Jess Hampshire | 690 | | |
| Liberal Democrats | Nigel Oakes | 574 | | |
| Liberal Democrats | Sami Mahrouche | 396 | | |
| Turnout | | | | |
| Conservative hold | | Swing | | |
| Conservative hold | | Swing | | |
| Conservative hold | | Swing | | |

=== Little Stour & Adisham ===
Location of Little Stour & Adisham

Little Stour & Adisham (1)
| Party | Candidate | Votes | % | ±% |
|---|---|---|---|---|
| Conservative | Stuart Walker | 1,194 | | |
| Liberal Democrats | Graham Duplock | 595 | | |
| Labour | Helen Vass | 357 | | |
| Green | Philippa Nice | 294 | | |
| Turnout | | | | |
| Conservative hold | | Swing | | |

=== Nailbourne ===
Location of Nailbourne ward

Nailbourne (1)
| Party | Candidate | Votes | % | ±% |
|---|---|---|---|---|
| Conservative | Simon Cook | 916 | | |
| Liberal Democrats | Michael Sole | 841 | | |
| UKIP | Keith Walsh | 287 | | |
| Labour | Joyce Wilson | 206 | | |
| Green | Emily Shirley | 164 | | |
| Turnout | | | | |
| Conservative hold | | Swing | | |

=== Northgate ===
Location of Northgate ward

Northgate (2)
| Party | Candidate | Votes | % | ±% |
|---|---|---|---|---|
| Labour | Alan Baldock | 1,025 | | |
| Labour | Jean Butcher | 940 | | |
| Conservative | Matthew Butt | 787 | | |
| Conservative | Shabana Raman | 620 | | |
| Green | Laura Thomas-Jenkins | 578 | | |
| Liberal Democrats | Valerie Ainscough | 311 | | |
| Liberal Democrats | Richard Benzie | 233 | | |
| Turnout | | | | |
| Labour hold | | Swing | | |
| Labour hold | | Swing | | |

=== Reculver ===
Location of Reculver ward

Reculver (1)
| Party | Candidate | Votes | % | ±% |
|---|---|---|---|---|
| Conservative | Guy Foster | 1,472 | | |
| Labour | Karen Douglas | 601 | | |
| Turnout | | | | |
| Conservative hold | | Swing | | |

=== Seasalter ===
Location of Sealsalter ward

Seasalter (2)
| Party | Candidate | Votes | % | ±% |
|---|---|---|---|---|
| Conservative | Stephen Bartley | 1,859 | | |
| Conservative | Colin Spooner | 1,564 | | |
| UKIP | Michael Bull | 1,203 | | |
| UKIP | Babychan Thomas | 959 | | |
| Labour | Elizabeth McLachlan | 847 | | |
| Labour | Wesley McLachlan | 723 | | |
| Green | Kathryn Nalson | 450 | | |
| Liberal Democrats | Clifford Arter | 357 | | |
| Liberal Democrats | Monica Eden-Green | 324 | | |
| Turnout | | | | |
| Conservative hold | | Swing | | |
| Conservative hold | | Swing | | |

=== St Stephen's ===
Location of St Stephen's ward

St Stephen's (2)
| Party | Candidate | Votes | % | ±% |
|---|---|---|---|---|
| Conservative | Terence Westgate | 1,215 | | |
| Conservative | Sally-Ann Waters | 1,147 | | |
| Labour | Michael Bland | 1,095 | | |
| Labour | Rosemary Duffield | 1,006 | | |
| Green | Rachel Downes | 742 | | |
| Liberal Democrats | Steven Coombs | 727 | | |
| Green | Natalie Sparkes | 621 | | |
| Liberal Democrats | Daniel Smith | 540 | | |
| UKIP | David Harrild | 464 | | |
| UKIP | Henry Simpson | 428 | | |
| Turnout | | | | |
| Conservative hold | | Swing | | |
| Conservative hold | | Swing | | |

=== Sturry ===
Location of Sturry ward

Sturry (2)
| Party | Candidate | Votes | % | ±% |
|---|---|---|---|---|
| Conservative | Georgina Glover | 1,665 | | |
| Conservative | Heather Taylor | 1,462 | | |
| Labour | Alan Holden | 921 | | |
| Labour | Stephen Howard | 704 | | |
| Green | Russell Page | 537 | | |
| Green | Andrew Cronshaw | 465 | | |
| Liberal Democrats | Alison Brumfit | 463 | | |
| Liberal Democrats | Bernard Duggan | 398 | | |
| Turnout | | | | |
| Conservative hold | | Swing | | |
| Conservative hold | | Swing | | |

=== Swalecliffe ===
Location of Swalecliffe ward

Swalecliffe (1)
| Party | Candidate | Votes | % | ±% |
|---|---|---|---|---|
| Conservative | John Thomas | 855 | | |
| UKIP | Terence Hudson | 599 | | |
| Labour | Charlotte Cornell | 566 | | |
| Liberal Democrats | Rachel Mummery | 174 | | |
| Green | James Kray-Hall | 122 | | |
| Turnout | | | | |
| Conservative hold | | Swing | | |

=== Tankerton ===
Location of Tankerton ward

Tankerton (1)
| Party | Candidate | Votes | % | ±% |
|---|---|---|---|---|
| Conservative | Neil Baker | 1,069 | | |
| Labour | Rachel Goodwin | 528 | | |
| Liberal Democrats | David Mummery | 327 | | |
| Green | Tom Sharp | 314 | | |
| Turnout | | | | |
| Conservative hold | | Swing | | |

=== West Bay ===
Location of West Bay ward

West Bay (1)
| Party | Candidate | Votes | % | ±% |
|---|---|---|---|---|
| UKIP | Geoffrey Wimble | 843 | | |
| Conservative | Peter Vickery-Jones | 842 | | |
| Labour | Michael Harrison | 438 | | |
| Turnout | | | | |
| UKIP hold | | Swing | | |

=== Westgate ===
Location of Westgate ward

Westgate (2)
| Party | Candidate | Votes | % | ±% |
|---|---|---|---|---|
| Conservative | John Brazier | 1,065 | | |
| Liberal Democrats | Michael Dixey | 934 | | |
| Conservative | Samuel Betz | 860 | | |
| Liberal Democrats | Ida Linfield | 849 | | |
| Green | Joanne Kidd | 774 | | |
| Labour | Howard Rowles | 772 | | |
| Labour | Rhoda Stankovich | 727 | | |
| Green | Anna Peckham | 629 | | |
| UKIP | David De Boick | 447 | | |
| Turnout | | | | |
| Conservative hold | | Swing | | |
| Liberal Democrats hold | | Swing | | |

=== Wincheap ===
Location of Wincheap ward

Wincheap (2)
| Party | Candidate | Votes | % | ±% |
|---|---|---|---|---|
| Liberal Democrats | Nicholas Eden-Green | 1,223 | | |
| Liberal Democrats | Charlotte MacCaul | 1,069 | | |
| Labour | Patricia Edwards | 1,025 | | |
| Conservative | Jacqueline Perkins | 809 | | |
| Labour | David Wilson | 796 | | |
| Conservative | Michael Perkins | 733 | | |
| Green | Patricia Marsh | 623 | | |
| UKIP | Mark Thatcher | 525 | | |
| Green | Catherine Peckham | 477 | | |
| UKIP | Richard West | 360 | | |
| Turnout | | | | |
| Liberal Democrats hold | | Swing | | |
| Liberal Democrats hold | | Swing | | |
