= Cobb Field =

Baseball park in Billings, Montana, US

Coordinates: 45°47′27.97″N 108°30′37.91″W

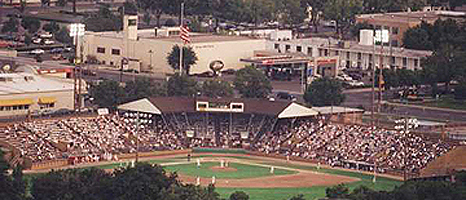
- Interactive map of Cobb Field
- Location: 901 N. 27th St. Billings, Montana 59101
- Owner: City of Billings
- Operator: Billings Parks & Recreation
- Capacity: 4,200
- Surface: Grass
- Field size: Left Field – 335 ft (102 m); Center Field – 405 ft (123 m); Right Field – 327 ft (99 m)

Construction
- Opened: 1932
- Demolished: September 18–22, 2007

Tenants
- Billings Mustangs (Minor League Baseball) (1948–1963, 1969–2007); Montana State University Billings (NCAA Baseball) (2006–2007); Billings American Legion Baseball (American Legion Baseball) (1948–2007)

Cobb Field was a baseball park located in Billings, Montana from 1932 to 2007. It was originally named Athletic Park and opened as Cobb Field on May 4, 1948, after renovations. It was the home of the Billings Mustangs, the Pioneer League Rookie Affiliate of the Cincinnati Reds, from 1948 to 2007. Cobb Field was named after Bob Cobb, who was responsible for bringing the Mustangs to Billings. It also hosted home games for local American Legion baseball teams. In 2006, the stadium welcomed the re-formed NCAA baseball team from nearby Montana State University Billings. From March to May, home games were played at the field.

== Features ==
Cobb Field had a natural grass surface. The dimensions were 335 feet to left, 405 feet to center, and 325 feet to right. Cobb Field sat 4,200, though crowds had been known to eclipse 5,000. The stadium was primarily made up of the same wood used when it had been built and had shown substantial wear. Many areas of the stadium had needed wooden boards to be installed over holes in the floor.

Cobb Field's concessions had undergone a drastic overhaul in its last few years. In addition to the basic concession items, the Mustangs added the "Cobb Grill" and "Betisse's Bullpen", a patio on the left field line where Mustangs fans can enjoy a beer and roam about freely. "Betisse's Bullpen" also hosted pre-game tailgate parties.

== Cobb Field film ==
Producers Craig Lindvahl and Joseph Fatheree created a film about the ballpark entitled Cobb Field, A Day at the Ballpark. The film gives a view of the world of minor league baseball from the eyes of the ballpark. It was shot during the final weeks of Cobb Field's existence. The film won Mid-America Emmys in three categories: Promotional Video, Musical Composition, and Photography. Lindvahl and Fatheree teach a film class at Effingham High School in Effingham, Illinois. Some of their students helped in the filming of the movie. Three of these students helped in the filming of Cobb Field and also won Mid-America Emmys for their film work.

== New stadium ==
On November 8, 2006, a $12.5 million stadium levy passed (with a 53% majority 'for' vote) allowing construction of a new stadium at the Cobb Field location. Construction began in the Spring of 2007 and Cobb Field was torn down after the 2007 season. The new stadium opened as Dehler Park on June 29, 2008.
