= Bently Spang =

American Cheyenne artist (born 1960)

- Born: 1960 (age 65–66); Crow Agency, Montana
- Citizenship: Northern Cheyenne Tribe of the Northern Cheyenne Indian Reservation, American
- Occupation: Multidisciplinary artist
- Website: www.bentlyspang.com

Bently Spang (born 1960) is a Northern Cheyenne multidisciplinary artist, educator, writer, and curator from Montana. His work has been exhibited widely in North America, South America, and Europe.

== Early life and education ==
Bently Spang is an enrolled citizen of the Northern Cheyenne Tribe of the Northern Cheyenne Indian Reservation in southeastern Montana. He was born at the Crow-Northern Cheyenne Indian Hospital on the Crow Reservation located in Crow Agency, Montana, in 1960. Spang grew up both on and off the Northern Cheyenne Indian Reservation, living in places such as Sitka, Alaska and Portland, Oregon.

He graduated from Montana State University Billings and earned a Master of Fine Arts degree at the University of Wisconsin–Madison.

== Career ==
He taught at the School of the Museum of Fine Arts, Boston from 2007 to 2009 as a full-time Visiting Faculty Member in Video. The University of Wyoming's American Indian Study Program named Spang its "Eminent Artist in Residence" for the spring semester of 2014. During this time he taught a class on Native American art and held exhibitions at the university's art museum.

Spang works as an independent artist and has a studio in Billings, Montana.

== Artworks ==
Spang's early work included mixed media sculptures, often made out of metal, and installations. His later work focused on incorporating digital technologies such as film and photography. Spang drew inspiration for his work in mixed media from how his Cheyenne ancestors incorporated European materials into their artwork; he has stated, "There was this fearlessness about mediums that we don't really have today." Spang considers his art autobiographical, addressing his cultural identity as a Cheyenne living in modern society and bridging the gap between these two worlds. Spang often adds humor to his works to help present these themes to his audience.

For example, in his sculpture Pevah (meaning "good" in Cheyenne), Spang used stone and wood to signify the Cheyenne part of him, and he used aluminum to signify the contemporary world. In constructing the project, he explained, "The metal binds the stone, the wood binds them both. I am bound by my culture; we are still here after all." Another one of Spang's sculptures is inspired by the Cheyenne tradition of adorning the fringe of war shirts with the hairs from the warrior's community. The fringe on Spang's War Shirt #1 is likewise composed of the photographic negatives of people he knows to show that he draws his strength from the community.

Spang collaborated with techno DJ Bert Benally to create the Techno Pow Wow, a mix of rave dance culture with a traditional pow wow. This piece was inspired by the 1990s electronic music movement. Spang claimed that the energy and effortless dancing reminded him of the pow wows at the reservation. Spang performed as part of this piece as "The Blue Guy", the tribal chief figure of the future. Through the installation's mix of cultural music and dance, Spang hoped to showcase the similarities between Native American and modern culture. In his New American Relics: Redux 2 (2009), Spang satirized museums and anthropologists' depiction of indigenous America as a "lost culture" using irony. He designed a futuristic museum exhibit for the "vit-heut" (meaning "white man" in Northern Cheyenne) with "artifacts" molded from the plastic encasings of ordinary modern objects.

From February to March 2014, Spang presented his "Bently Spang: On Fire" exhibition at the University of Wyoming Art Museum, which told the story of the 2012 Ash Creek wildfire. In July 2017, Spang presented the video installation "War Shirt #6 – Waterways" as part of his Modern Warrior Series, at the Dry Creek Schoolhouse in Belgrade, Montana. The installation was a series of moving images within a steel war shirt conveying Spang's relationship with water.

== Awards and recognition ==
In 2003, Spang won an Outstanding Alumni Award from MSU Billings for "Exceptional Contribution" and a Woodrow Wilson Foundation: Imagining America grant. The next year, he was awarded a Paul G. Allen Family Foundation Grant for his residency in conjunction with the Techno Powwow Project. Spang has also gained artist fellowships from the Creative Capital Foundation and the Joan Mitchell Foundation. He was one of the eight artists who received the 2017 Artist's Innovation Award from the Montana Arts Council and a 2018 recipient of the Native Arts and Culture Foundation National Artist Fellowship.
