= Roy McPipe =

American basketball player (born 1950)

Personal information
- Born: May 5, 1950 (age 76) Hammond, Indiana
- Listed height: 6 ft 3 in (1.91 m)
- Listed weight: 205 lb (93 kg)

Career information
- High school: Hammond (Hammond, Indiana)
- College: Northwest CC (1969–1970); Montana State Billings (1971–1974)
- NBA draft: 1974: 6th round, 102nd overall pick
- Drafted by: Washington Bullets
- Position: Shooting guard
- Number: 30

Career history
- 1974: Utah Stars

Career highlights
- 2× Frontier Player of the Year (1973, 1974); 3× First-team All-Frontier (1972–1974)
- Stats at Basketball Reference

Roy Lee McPipe (born May 5, 1950) is a former American professional basketball player.

McPipe was born in Hammond, Indiana. A 6'3" guard from Eastern Montana College, McPipe played professional basketball with the American Basketball Association's Utah Stars in 1975, although his career consisted of only five regular-season ABA games. He had previously been drafted by the NBA in both 1973 (with the Los Angeles Lakers) and in 1974 (with the Washington Bullets) but decided to stay in school.

McPipe still holds the career scoring records of total points, points per game, and total field goals at Eastern Montana College (now known as Montana State University-Billings).
