= Warley =

Warley may refer to:

== Places in the United Kingdom ==
- Warley, Essex, a suburb of Brentwood
- Warley, West Midlands, a neighbourhood centred on the towns of Oldbury and Smethwick
  - Warley (UK Parliament constituency), a current constituency
  - County Borough of Warley, a former district
- Warley Town, West Yorkshire

== Schools ==
- Warley College, a former college of further and higher education in the West Midlands of England
- Warley High School, a former comprehensive school in the West Midlands

== Ships ==
- HMS Calcutta, the East Indiaman Warley, built in 1788 and sold to the Royal Navy in 1795
- Warley (1796 ship), an East Indiaman, launched in 1795, participated in Nathaniel Dance's victory at the Battle of Pulo Aura

== People ==
- Warley (footballer, born 1978), Brazilian football forward Warley Silva dos Santos
- Warley (footballer, born 1999), Brazilian football wing-back Warley Leandro da Silva
- Warley Oliveira (born 1989), Brazilian football forward
- Alexander F. Warley (1823–1895), American naval officer
- Ben Warley (1936–2002), American National Basketball Association player
- Jared D. Warley, American politician active in the 1870s
- Simon Warley (born 1972), English solicitor and former first-class cricketer
- William Warley (1884–1946), American journalist and editor

== Other uses ==
- Warley Hospital, Warley, Essex, a former psychiatric hospital
- Warley F.C., a former English football club based in the West Midlands

== See also ==
- Great Warley, Essex, a village
- Little Warley, Essex, a village
- Warley East (UK Parliament constituency), a former constituency
- Warley West (UK Parliament constituency), a former constituency
- Warlei (footballer) (born 1999), Brazilian football goalkeeper Warlei Cesar Tarata Santos
- Warleigh, Somerset, a hamlet
