= 2003 Canterbury City Council election =

2003 UK local government election

← 1999	1 May 2003	2007 →

All 50 seats in the Canterbury City Council 26 seats needed for a majority
	First party	Second party	Third party
Party	Conservative	Liberal Democrats	Labour
Last election	Conservative
Seats won	24	19	7
Popular vote	16,164	11,308	8,655
Percentage	42.4%	29.7%	22.7%
- Map of the results of the 2003 Canterbury council election. Labour in red, Conservatives in blue and Lib Dems in orange.
Council control before election
No overall control
Council control after election
No overall control

The 2003 Canterbury City Council election took place on 1 May 2003 to elect members of the Canterbury City Council in Kent, England. This was on the same day as other local elections. It was the first election to be held under new ward boundaries. The council remained under no overall control.

== Results summary ==
2003 Canterbury City Council election
Party	Seats	Gains	Losses	Net gain/loss	Seats %	Votes %	Votes	+/−
Conservative	24	4	0	▲6	48.0	43.7	36,007	+6.6
Liberal Democrats	19	1	0	▲2	38.0	31.3	25,789	+0.5
Labour	7	0	5	▼7	14.0	21.4	17,617	-7.4
Green	0	0	0	Steady	0.0	2.3	1,877	-0.2
UKIP	0	0	0	Steady	0.0	0.9	716	N/A
Socialist Alliance	0	0	0	Steady	0.0	0.3	288	N/A
Council Tax Payers	0	0	0	Steady	0.0	0.2	143	N/A

== Ward results ==
=== Barnham Downs ===
Barnham Downs
Party	Candidate	Votes	%	±%
Liberal Democrats	Martin Vye	761	68.4	+18.9
Conservative	Don Faulkner	318	28.6	−14.6
Labour	Andrew Fenyo	34	3.1	−4.2
Majority		443	39.8	
Turnout		1,113	53.5	
Liberal Democrats hold		Swing	▲16.8	

=== Barton ===
Barton (3 seats)
Party	Candidate	Votes	%	±%
Liberal Democrats	Carole Brett	1,051	55.7	
Liberal Democrats	Christina Kay-Bradley	919	48.7	
Liberal Democrats	Christopher Took	855	45.3	
Conservative	Michael Northey	854	45.3	
Conservative	Pauline Hook	799	42.4	
Conservative	Terrence Ogier	736	39.0	
Labour	Linda Cooper	263	13.9	
Labour	Carl Parsons	242	12.8	
Green	Keith Bothwell	175	9.3	
Green	Corey Mills	145	7.7	
Council Tax Payers	James Cooper	143	7.6	
Turnout		1,886	30.5	
Liberal Democrats hold				
Liberal Democrats hold				
Liberal Democrats hold				

=== Blean Forest ===
Blean Forest
Party	Candidate	Votes	%
Conservative	Hazel McCabe	672	70.4
Conservative	John Gilbey	562	58.9
Green	Geoffrey Meaden	176	18.4
Labour	Michael Fuller	159	16.7
Green	Philip Rogers	146	15.3
Labour	David McLellan	139	14.6
Turnout		954	22.6
Conservative hold			
Conservative win (new seat)			

=== Chartham and Stone Street ===
Chartham and Stone Street
Party	Candidate	Votes	%
Conservative	Rosemary Doyle	756	53.4
Conservative	Michael Patterson	696	49.2
Liberal Democrats	Andrea Nicholson	372	26.3
Liberal Democrats	Carolyn Colthup	359	25.4
Labour	John Chiappino	268	18.9
Labour	Jodah Bhujan	196	13.9
Turnout		1,415	36.2
Conservative win (new seat)			
Conservative win (new seat)			

=== Chestfield and Swalecliffe ===
Chestfield and Swalecliffe (3 seats)
Party	Candidate	Votes	%
Conservative	Jennifer Samper	1,577	65.2
Conservative	Ian Thomas	1,503	62.1
Conservative	Pat Todd	1,495	61.8
Labour	Jane Hardy	434	17.9
Labour	Ruth Wreford	386	16.0
Liberal Democrats	Martin Brown	369	15.2
Liberal Democrats	Michael Steed	345	14.3
Liberal Democrats	Suzanne Tibertius	328	13.6
Turnout		2,420	36.5
Conservative win (new seat)			
Conservative win (new seat)			
Conservative win (new seat)			

=== Gorrell ===
Gorrell (2 seats)
Party	Candidate	Votes	%	±%
Labour	Peter Halfpenny	805	45.9	
Labour	Wes McLachlan	754	43.0	
Conservative	Jacqueline Perkins	746	42.6	
Conservative	Paul Carnell	720	41.1	
Liberal Democrats	Margaret Lansdell	177	10.1	
Liberal Democrats	Roger Lansdell	144	8.2	
Socialist Alliance	Peter Holloway	59	3.4	
Turnout		1,752	40.9	
Labour hold				
Labour hold				

=== Greenhill and Eddington ===
Greenhill and Eddington (2 seats)
Party	Candidate	Votes	%
Liberal Democrats	Roger Matthews	478	36.9
Liberal Democrats	Nigel Oakes	465	35.9
Conservative	Lynsey Laker	413	31.9
Conservative	Vincent McMahan	412	31.8
Labour	Bill Brade	359	27.7
Labour	Robert Walker	330	25.5
Green	Jess Hampshire	73	5.6
Turnout		1,294	32.8
Liberal Democrats win (new seat)			
Liberal Democrats win (new seat)			

=== Harbledown ===
Harbledown
Party	Candidate	Votes	%	±%
Liberal Democrats	Michael Dixey	517	58.4	−11.7
Conservative	Ann Taylor	264	29.8	+8.0
Labour	Victoria Foster	104	11.8	+3.7
Majority		253	28.6	
Turnout		885	45.2	
Liberal Democrats hold		Swing	▼9.9	

=== Harbour ===
Harbour (2 seats)
Party	Candidate	Votes	%	±%
Labour	Julia Seath	729	57.0	
Labour	John Wratten	650	50.8	
Conservative	Michael Harrison	485	37.9	
Conservative	Howard Smith	455	35.5	
Socialist Alliance	Bunny La Roche	161	12.6	
Liberal Democrats	Janet Berridge	158	12.3	
Liberal Democrats	Gwendoline Bale	152	11.9	
Turnout		1,280	37.1	
Labour hold				
Labour hold				

=== Herne and Broomfield ===
Herne and Broomfield (3 seats)
Party	Candidate	Votes	%
Liberal Democrats	Ronald Mavers	685	36.3
Liberal Democrats	Ian Wright	653	34.6
Conservative	Robert Bright	619	32.8
Conservative	Kay Shannon	609	32.2
Conservative	Pauline Roper	599	31.7
Liberal Democrats	David Robinson	565	29.9
UKIP	John Moore	299	15.8
Green	Carol Davis	261	13.8
UKIP	Edith Bigg	214	11.3
Labour	John Brown	213	11.3
UKIP	Terence Kendall	203	10.7
Labour	Peter Tavener	203	10.7
Labour	Eric Reeves	192	10.2
Turnout		1,889	31.9
Liberal Democrats win (new seat)			
Liberal Democrats win (new seat)			
Conservative win (new seat)			

=== Heron ===
Heron (3 seats)
Party	Candidate	Votes	%	±%
Liberal Democrats	Ron Flaherty	1,050	53.5	
Liberal Democrats	Maisie Seager	1,017	51.8	
Liberal Democrats	Ken Hando	960	48.9	
Conservative	Jennifer Kadwell	544	27.7	
Conservative	Jean Herwin	531	27.1	
Conservative	Roy Smale	515	26.2	
Labour	Rolane Brade	346	17.6	
Labour	Lynnda Faux-Bowyer	317	16.2	
Labour	Tony Morris	304	15.5	
Turnout		1,962	32.0	
Liberal Democrats hold				
Liberal Democrats hold				
Liberal Democrats hold				

=== Little Stour ===
Little Stour
Party	Candidate	Votes	%	±%
Conservative	Lewis Norris	454	57.8	+13.9
Liberal Democrats	Arthur Linfoot	213	27.1	−13.4
Labour	Alan Forrest	119	15.1	−0.6
Majority		241	30.7	
Turnout		786	38.3	
Conservative hold		Swing	▲13.7	

=== Marshside ===
Marshside
Party	Candidate	Votes	%	±%
Labour	Michael Nee	348	52.0	+2.9
Conservative	Heather Taylor	321	48.0	+13.8
Majority		27	4.0	
Turnout		669	34.9	
Labour hold		Swing	▼5.5	

=== North Nailbourne ===
North Nailbourne
Party	Candidate	Votes	%	±%
Conservative	Bill Oakey	574	56.2	+7.0
Liberal Democrats	Janet Horsley	447	43.8	+14.8
Majority		127	12.4	
Turnout		1,021	50.0	
Conservative hold		Swing	▼3.9	

=== Northgate ===
Northgate (2 seats)
Party	Candidate	Votes	%	±%
Labour	Ron Pepper	583	48.3	
Labour	Fred Whitemore	558	46.3	
Conservative	Graham Gibbens	469	38.9	
Conservative	Donald Bunting	443	36.7	
Liberal Democrats	Clifford Arter	123	10.2	
Liberal Democrats	Andrew Frogley	105	8.7	
Turnout		1,206	30.5	
Labour hold				
Labour hold				

=== Reculver ===
Reculver
Party	Candidate	Votes	%	±%
Conservative	Gabrielle Davis	1,226	49.4	
Conservative	Michael Street-Williams	1,216	49.0	
Conservative	Gillian Reuby	1,213	48.9	
Liberal Democrats	Iris Law	923	37.2	
Liberal Democrats	Margaret Flaherty	888	35.8	
Liberal Democrats	George Corney	872	35.1	
Labour	Kim Brade-Dawkins	314	12.7	
Labour	David Hornsby	273	11.0	
Turnout		2,481	38.8	
Conservative hold				
Conservative hold				
Conservative hold				

=== St. Stephens ===
St. Stephens
Party	Candidate	Votes	%	±%
Conservative	Harry Cragg	937	40.0	
Conservative	Kenneth Avery	852	36.4	
Liberal Democrats	Michael Berridge	808	34.5	
Liberal Democrats	John Purchese	807	34.5	
Liberal Democrats	Nicholas Blake	770	32.9	
Conservative	Barrie Packer	754	32.2	
Labour	Jennie Bukht	607	25.9	
Labour	John Jackson	482	20.6	
Labour	Paul Todd	453	19.4	
Green	Catherine Cantwell	202	8.6	
Green	Richard Podger	149	6.4	
Turnout		2,340	35.6	
Conservative hold				
Conservative gain from Labour				
Liberal Democrats hold				

=== Seasalter ===
Seasalter
Party	Candidate	Votes	%	±%
Conservative	Jean Law	1,233	56.1	
Conservative	Cyril Windsor	1,209	55.0	
Conservative	Michael Sharp	1,194	54.3	
Labour	Jean Beynon	770	35.0	
Labour	Christopher Ryan	740	33.7	
Labour	Sandra Ashford	675	30.7	
Liberal Democrats	Keith Hooker	308	14.0	
Turnout		2,197	39.0	
Conservative hold				
Conservative hold				
Conservative win (new seat)				

=== Sturry North ===
Sturry North
Party	Candidate	Votes	%	±%
Conservative	Tony Austin	426	58.0	+30.3
Labour	Nicholas Turner	309	42.0	−6.6
Majority		117	15.9	
Turnout		735	35.4	
Conservative gain from Labour		Swing	▲18.5	

=== Sturry South ===
Sturry South
Party	Candidate	Votes	%	±%
Conservative	Marion Attwood	550	75.5	+5.7
Labour	Susan Barnard	92	12.6	−5.9
Liberal Democrats	Monica Eden-Green	86	11.8	+0.1
Majority		458	62.9	
Turnout		728	32.7	
Conservative hold		Swing	▲5.8	

=== Tankerton ===
Tankerton (2 seats)
Party	Candidate	Votes	%	±%
Conservative	Jean Harrison	851	51.1	
Conservative	David Cavell	822	49.4	
Liberal Democrats	Heather Scott	531	31.9	
Liberal Democrats	Donna Dwight	511	30.7	
Labour	Michael Vince	198	11.9	
Socialist Alliance	Lorraine Vincent	68	4.1	
Turnout		1,665	44.8	
Conservative hold				
Conservative hold				

=== West Bay ===
West Bay (2 seats)
Party	Candidate	Votes	%	±%
Conservative	Peter Lee	893	55.5	
Conservative	Crispin Rampling	815	50.7	
Labour	Brian Hunter	546	33.9	
Labour	John Neil	445	27.7	
Liberal Democrats	Margaret Burns	320	19.9	
Turnout		1,609	33.8	
Conservative gain from Labour				
Conservative gain from Labour				

=== Westgate ===
Westgate (3 seats)
Party	Candidate	Votes	%	±%
Liberal Democrats	Susan Ashmore-Fish	793	38.3	
Liberal Democrats	Christian Farthing	769	37.1	
Liberal Democrats	Richard Parkinson	768	37.1	
Labour	Jean Butcher	646	31.2	
Labour	Philip Bond	545	26.3	
Conservative	Douglas Robinson	540	26.1	
Labour	Gordon Hartley	537	25.9	
Conservative	John Anderson	527	25.4	
Conservative	Victor Gray	522	25.2	
Green	Deirdre Balaam	177	8.5	
Green	Ronald Hollands	160	7.7	
Turnout		2,071	35.8	
Liberal Democrats hold				
Liberal Democrats hold				
Liberal Democrats gain from Labour				

=== Wincheap ===
Wincheap (3 seats)
Party	Candidate	Votes	%	±%
Liberal Democrats	Nick Eden-Green	1,138	58.0	
Liberal Democrats	Charlotte MacCaul	1,126	57.4	
Liberal Democrats	Alex Perkins	1,103	56.2	
Conservative	Alan Griffiths	442	22.5	
Labour	Cecile Manning	409	20.8	
Conservative	Neil Parsonson	408	20.8	
Labour	John Derrick	275	14.0	
Labour	Anne Seller	266	13.6	
Conservative	Patricia Parsonson	236	12.0	
Green	Emily Shirley	213	10.9	
Turnout		1,963	33.8	
Liberal Democrats hold				
Liberal Democrats hold				
Liberal Democrats hold				
