= Titus Warmsley =

American basketball player

Titus Jermaine Warmsley (born September 30, 1977) is an American former professional basketball player.

== Career ==
Warmsley, a 5'11'' point guard, attended Bishop Sullivan High School in Baton Rouge, Louisiana, before enrolling at University of Texas at Austin. In 1995–96, he saw action in 25 games for the Longhorns, averaging 2.8 points a contest. After transferring to NCAA Division 2 school Montana State University Billings, Warmsley scored a total 1,507 points for the Yellowjackets between 1996 and 1999. In 1997–98, he averaged 22.17 points and 1998–99 24.03 points per contest. He had a career high 45 points against Queens (NC) on November 14, 1998. During that game, Warmsley hit 22 of 24 his free throws. He received NCAA Division II All-American honors in 1997–98 and 1998–99 as well as NCAA All-West Region First Team distinction in both seasons. He was picked as the Pac West Player of the Year in the 1997–98 season. In 2008, he was inducted into the Montana State University Billings Hall of Fame.

In the summer of 1999, Warmsley was invited by NBA’s Boston Celtics to participate in a tryout. However, he did not make the roster and took his game to Europe. From 1999 to 2001, he played for USC Freiburg of Germany’s second-tier 2. Basketball Bundesliga. He signed with BK Pezinok of Slovakia for the 2001–02 season. Besides playing in Slovakia’s domestic league, Warmsley also participated in the European competition Saporta Cup with the club. He parted ways with Pezinok in January 2002 and then was picked up by Slovenian side KK Elektra Sostanj, where he averaged 22.4 points a game until the remainder of the 2001–02 campaign.

In the 2002–03 season, he turned out for KK Bosna Sarajevo in the ABA League, averaging 8.1 points a contest in nine appearances. In December 2002, Warmsley joined Namika Lahti of Finland's Korisliiga for a tryout, but then signed with the Solna Vikings of Sweden in January 2003. Alongside players like Eric Taylor and Mattias Sahlström, he helped the Vikings capture the Swedish national championship title in April 2003 and was subsequently named to the Eurobasket.com All-Swedish League Second Team as well as to the All-Imports Team. After the 2002–03 season, Warmsley returned to the US. He is the founder of MindGame Mental Training, as an actor he starred in the movie Glory Road. In 2008, he published the book Don't talk About It... Be About it!
