= Simon Warley =

English cricketer

Personal information
- Full name: Simon Nicholas Warley
- Born: 6 January 1972 (age 54); Sittingbourne, Kent, England
- Batting: Right-handed
- Bowling: Right-arm medium-fast

Domestic team information
- Years: Team
- 1991–1992: Oxford University

Career statistics
Competition	First-class
Matches	9
Runs scored	132
Batting average	12.00
100s/50s	–/–
Top score	35
Catches/stumpings	3/–
- Source: Cricinfo, 25 June 2020

Simon Nicholas Warley (born 6 January 1972) is an English solicitor and former first-class cricketer.

Warley was born at Sittingbourne in January 1972. He later studied at Oriel College at the University of Oxford. While studying at Oxford, he played first-class cricket for Oxford University in 1991 and 1992, making nine appearances against county opposition. Warley scored 132 runs in his nine matches, at an average of 12.00 and a high score of 35.

Warley was a Labour Party councillor on Canterbury City Council for the Westgate Ward, before losing his seat in the 2019 Canterbury City Council election. By profession he is a solicitor, having been admitted to practice in 1997.
