= 2011 Canterbury City Council election =

2011 UK local government election

- 5 May 2011

All 50 seats in the Canterbury City Council 26 seats needed for a majority
	First party	Second party	Third party
Party	Conservative	Liberal Democrats	Labour
Last election	29	19	2
Seats before	29	17	2
Seats won	36	11	3
Seat change	▲7	▼8	▲1
Popular vote	20,633	11,717	11,114
Percentage	44.0%	25.0%	23.7%
- Map of the results of the 2011 Canterbury council election. Labour in red, Conservatives in blue and Lib Dems in orange.
Council control before election
Conservative
Council control after election
Conservative

The 2011 Canterbury City Council election took place on 5 May 2011 to elect members of the Canterbury City Council in Kent, England. This was on the same day as other local elections. The Conservative Party retained control of the council.

== Results by ward (A-Z) ==
=== Barham Downs (1) ===
Barham Downs
Party	Candidate	Votes	%	±%
Conservative	Bill Oakley	538	42.9	+5.8
Liberal Democrats	Michael Sole	510	40.7	−18.2
Green	Alice Taylor	206	16.4	N/A
Majority		28	2.2	−19.6
Majority		1254		
Conservative gain from Liberal Democrats		Swing		

=== Barton (3) ===
Barton
Party	Candidate	Votes	%
Conservative	Jeremy Bellamy	887	37.5
Liberal Democrats	Paula Vickers*	860	36.3
Conservative	Steven Williams	809	34.2
Liberal Democrats	Jose Casal	788	33.3
Liberal Democrats	Adam Parsons*	787	33.2
Conservative	Mat McGill	745	31.5
Labour	Fred Whitemore	621	26.2
Labour	David McLellan	599	25.3
Labour	Anne Thirkell	561	23.7
Green	Keith Bothwell	448	18.9
Turnout		2368	
Conservative gain from Liberal Democrats			
Liberal Democrats hold			
Conservative gain from Liberal Democrats			

=== Blean Forest (2) ===
Blean Forest
Party	Candidate	Votes	%
Conservative	Hazel McCabe*	626	55.6
Conservative	John Gilbey*	568	50.4
Green	Alexander Murray	400	35.5
Green	Zoe Scandrett	300	26.6
Liberal Democrats	Helen Clark	184	16.3
Liberal Democrats	Debbie Enever	173	15.4
Turnout		1126	
Conservative hold			
Conservative hold			

=== Chartham & Stone Street (2) ===
Chartham & Stone Street
Party	Candidate	Votes	%
Conservative	Rosemary Doyle*	1,119	58.8
Conservative	Robert Thomas	929	48.8
Labour	Andy Chandler	571	30.0
Labour	Victoria Foster	446	23.4
Liberal Democrats	Peter Atkin	407	21.4
Liberal Democrats	Philip Robinson	336	17.6
Turnout		1904	
Conservative hold			
Conservative hold			

=== Chestfield & Swalecliffe (3) ===
Chestfield & Swalecliffe
Party	Candidate	Votes	%
Conservative	Jennifer Samper*	1,912	65.5
Conservative	Ian Thomas*	1,848	63.3
Conservative	Pat Todd*	1,831	62.7
Labour	Bob Walker	747	25.6
Labour	Liz McLachlan	730	25.0
Labour	Dee Cartright	729	25.0
Liberal Democrats	Colleen Howard	334	11.4
Liberal Democrats	John Allen	333	11.4
Liberal Democrats	Richard Benzie	292	10.0
Turnout		2919	
Conservative hold			
Conservative hold			
Conservative hold			
