= 2007 Canterbury City Council election =

2007 UK local government election

- 3 May 2007

All 50 seats in the Canterbury City Council 26 seats needed for a majority
	First party	Second party	Third party
Party	Conservative	Liberal Democrats	Labour
Last election	24	19	7
Seats before	26^{†}	17^{†}	7
Seats won	29	19	2
Seat change	▲3	▲2	▼5
Popular vote	18,501	13,423	5,144
Percentage	44.4%	32.2%	12.3%
- Map of the results of the 2007 Canterbury council election. Labour in red, Conservatives in blue and Lib Dems in orange.^{†} The Conservatives gained a seat from the Liberal Democrats in a by-election in 2005
Council control before election
No overall control
Council control after election
Conservative

The 2007 Canterbury City Council election took place on 3 May 2007 to elect members of the Canterbury City Council in Kent, England. This was on the same day as other local elections. The Conservative Party retained control of the council, which had previously been under no overall control until 2005 when The Conservative Party took control following a by election and defection from the Liberal Democrats.

== Results by Ward (A-Z) ==
=== Barham Downs (1) ===
Barham Downs
Party	Candidate	Votes	%
Liberal Democrats	Martin Vye*	656	58.9
Conservative	Bill Oakley	413	37.1
Labour	Doreen Turner	44	4.0
Majority		243	21.8
Turnout		1113	
Liberal Democrats hold			

=== Barton (3) ===
Barton
Party	Candidate	Votes	%
Liberal Democrats	Lee Glendon	1,098	51.3
Liberal Democrats	Paula Vickers	1,074	50.2
Liberal Democrats	Adam Parsons	1,054	49.3
Conservative	Michael Northey	874	40.8
Conservative	Carol Gilbey	780	36.4
Conservative	Simon Plumb	744	34.8
Labour	David McLellan	230	10.7
Council Tax Payers	Blue Cooper	225	10.5
Council Tax Payers	Robert Fox	186	8.7
Independent	Peter Thomson	154	7.2
Turnout		2140	
Liberal Democrats hold			
Liberal Democrats hold			
Liberal Democrats hold			

=== Blean Forest (2) ===
Blean Forest
Party	Candidate	Votes	%
Conservative	Hazel McCabe*	625	63.7
Conservative	John Gilbey*	560	57.1
Liberal Democrats	Monica Eden-Green	261	26.6
Liberal Democrats	Shaun Nichols	234	23.9
Labour	Matthew Friend	150	15.3
Labour	Arjun Mittra	131	13.4
Turnout		981	
Conservative hold			
Conservative hold			

=== Chartham & Stone Street (2) ===
Chartham & Stone Street
Party	Candidate	Votes	%
Conservative	Rosemary Doyle*	958	65.6
Conservative	Mike Patterson*	913	62.5
Liberal Democrats	Michael Sole	437	29.9
Liberal Democrats	Graham Duplock	372	25.5
Labour	John Chiappino	242	16.6
Turnout		1461	
Conservative hold			
Conservative hold			

=== Chestfield & Swalecliffe (3) ===
Chestfield & Swalecliffe
Party	Candidate	Votes	%
Conservative	Jennifer Samper*	1,871	76.7
Conservative	Pat Todd*	1,798	73.7
Conservative	Ian Thomas*	1,772	72.7
Labour	Thomas Hyner	401	16.4
Liberal Democrats	John Allen	387	15.9
Liberal Democrats	Colleen Howard	387	15.9
Labour	Patrick Casey	375	15.4
Liberal Democrats	Norman Seatherton	325	13.3
Turnout		2439	
Conservative hold			
Conservative hold			
Conservative hold			

=== Gorrell (2) ===
Gorrell
Party	Candidate	Votes	%
Conservative	Paul Carnell	905	48.1
Conservative	Jackie Perkins	851	45.2
Labour	Julia Hykin	550	29.2
Labour	Ian Leslie	521	27.7
Liberal Democrats	Janet Berridge	211	11.2
Liberal Democrats	Clifford Arter	209	11.1
Respect	Nick Dent	189	10.0
Respect	Bunny la Roche	184	9.8
BNP	Dennis Whiting	144	7.7
Turnout		1882	
Conservative gain from Labour			
Conservative gain from Labour			

=== Greenhill & Eddington (2) ===
Greenhill & Eddington
Party	Candidate	Votes	%
Liberal Democrats	Roger Matthews*	704	53.7
Liberal Democrats	Margaret Flaherty	702	53.5
Conservative	Neil Roberts	616	47.0
Conservative	David Hirst	599	45.7
Turnout		1311	
Liberal Democrats hold			
Liberal Democrats hold			

=== Harblesdown (1) ===
Harblesdown
Party	Candidate	Votes	%
Liberal Democrats	Michael Dixey*	710	62.9
Conservative	Maureen Robinson	371	32.9
Labour	Philip Bond	48	4.3
Majority		339	30.0
Turnout		1129	
Liberal Democrats hold			

=== Harbour (2) ===
Harbour
Party	Candidate	Votes	%
Labour	Julia Seath*	682	39.7
Labour	John Wratten*	602	35.1
Liberal Democrats	Heather Scott	574	33.4
Liberal Democrats	David Mummery	549	32.0
Conservative	Graham Birchall	514	30.0
Conservative	Neil Baker	510	29.7
Turnout		1716	
Labour hold			
Labour hold			

=== Herne & Broomfield (3) ===
Herne & Broomfield
Party	Candidate	Votes	%
Conservative	Evelyn Bissett	1,001	53.5
Conservative	Peter Vickery-Jones	975	52.1
Conservative	Sharron Sonnex	892	47.6
Liberal Democrats	George Mavers	548	29.3
Liberal Democrats	Nigel Oakes	479	25.6
Liberal Democrats	Mike Dyson	475	25.4
Green	Carol Davis	357	19.1
Herne Bay First	Michael Khoury	234	12.5
Herne Bay First	Norman Sands	197	10.5
UKIP	John Moore	169	9.0
UKIP	Brian MacDowell	165	8.8
UKIP	Joy Wilson	123	6.6
Turnout		1872	
Conservative gain from Liberal Democrats			
Conservative gain from Liberal Democrats			
Conservative hold			

=== Heron (3) ===
Heron
Party	Candidate	Votes	%
Liberal Democrats	Ron Flaherty*	1,067	54.4
Liberal Democrats	Robert Bright**	995	50.7
Liberal Democrats	Ken Hando*	902	46.0
Conservative	Maisie Seager*	610	31.1
Conservative	Martin Thomas	583	29.7
Conservative	John Law	573	29.2
Herne Bay First	Ricardo Macari	453	23.1
Herne Bay First	Peter Goodwin	428	21.8
Labour	Michael Britton	278	14.2
Turnout		1963	
Liberal Democrats hold			
Liberal Democrats hold			
Liberal Democrats hold			

Councillor Bright had previously been elected for the Conservatives in Herne & Broomfield ward in 2003, but sought re-election for the Liberal Democrats in Heron ward. He ultimately won re-election.

Maisie Seager had previously been elected for the Liberal Democrats in 2003, but sought re-election for the Conservatives. She ultimately failed to win re-election.

=== Little Stour (1) ===
Little Stour
Party	Candidate	Votes	%
Liberal Democrats	Brian Staley	513	49.7
Conservative	Lewis Norris	470	45.5
Labour	Nicholas Turner	50	4.8
Majority		43	4.2
Turnout		1033	
Liberal Democrats gain from Conservative			

=== Marshside (1) ===
Marshside
Party	Candidate	Votes	%
Conservative	Carolyn Parry	565	61.7
Liberal Democrats	Lisa Bright	203	22.2
Labour	Damian Crockford	147	16.1
Majority		362	39.5
Turnout		915	
Conservative gain from Labour			

=== North Nailbourne (1) ===
North Nailbourne
Party	Candidate	Votes	%
Conservative	John Anderson	526	53.6
Liberal Democrats	Janet Horsley	303	30.9
Green	Emily Shirley	153	15.6
Majority		223	22.7
Turnout		982	
Conservative hold			

=== Northgate (2) ===
Northgate
Party	Candidate	Votes	%
Conservative	Darren Ellis	523	46.2
Conservative	Sally Pickersgill	500	44.2
Labour	Fred Whitemore*	433	38.3
Labour	Alan Baldock	416	36.7
Liberal Democrats	Clare Brumfit	126	11.1
Liberal Democrats	Philip Robinson	121	10.7
Green	Susan Chivers	115	10.2
Independent	Richard Wilkins-Oppler	30	2.7
Turnout		1132	
Conservative gain from Labour			
Conservative gain from Labour			

=== Reculver (3) ===
Reculver
Party	Candidate	Votes	%
Conservative	Gabrielle Davis*	1,385	57.5
Conservative	Gillian Reuby*	1,329	55.1
Conservative	Ann Taylor	1,240	51.5
Herne Bay First	John Abbatt	763	31.7
Herne Bay First	Jo Verrico	639	26.5
Herne Bay First	Mark Speed	550	22.8
Liberal Democrats	Margaret Burns	535	22.2
Liberal Democrats	Sally Rush	520	21.6
UKIP	Ronald Garretty	270	11.2
Turnout		2410	
Conservative hold			
Conservative hold			
Conservative hold			

=== St Stephen's (3) ===
St Stephen's
Party	Candidate	Votes	%
Liberal Democrats	Michael Berridge*	1,046	49.3
Liberal Democrats	Jo Calvert-Mindell	1,028	48.5
Conservative	Harry Cragg*	970	45.7
Conservative	Angela Gibbins	920	43.4
Liberal Democrats	Nicholas Blake	919	43.3
Conservative	Kenneth Avery*	887	41.8
Green	Richard Podger	341	16.1
Labour	Andrew Fenyo	252	11.9
Turnout		2121	
Liberal Democrats hold			
Liberal Democrats gain from Conservative			
Conservative hold			

=== Seasalter (3) ===
Seasalter
Party	Candidate	Votes	%
Conservative	Jean Law*	1,518	69.7
Conservative	Michael Sharp*	1,489	68.4
Conservative	Cyril Windsor*	1,461	67.1
Liberal Democrats	Rachel Mummery	493	22.6
Labour	John Allan	455	20.9
Labour	Stephen Furber	402	18.5
Liberal Democrats	Derek Maslin	377	17.3
Liberal Democrats	Graham Wood	339	15.6
Turnout		2178	
Conservative hold			
Conservative hold			
Conservative hold			

=== Sturry North (1) ===
Sturry North
Party	Candidate	Votes	%
Conservative	Tony Austin*	421	59.4
Liberal Democrats	Philip Mitchell	155	21.9
Labour	Alan Forrest	133	18.8
Majority		266	37.5
Turnout		709	
Conservative hold			

=== Sturry South (1) ===
Sturry South
Party	Candidate	Votes	%
Conservative	Heather Taylor	438	54.8
Liberal Democrats	Michael Steed	272	34.0
Labour	Victoria Foster	90	11.3
Majority		166	20.8
Turnout		800	
Conservative hold			

=== Tankerton (2) ===
Tankerton
Party	Candidate	Votes	%
Conservative	Jeanne Harrison*	974	62.9
Conservative	Martin Fisher	970	62.6
Liberal Democrats	Donna Dwight	386	24.9
Liberal Democrats	John Clark	340	21.9
Labour	Trevor Seath	223	14.4
Labour	Ronald Thacker	204	13.2
Turnout		1549	
Conservative hold			
Conservative hold			

=== West Bay (2) ===
West Bay
Party	Candidate	Votes	%
Conservative	Peter Lee*	750	44.1
Conservative	Vincent McMahan	710	41.8
Liberal Democrats	June Raybaud	572	33.6
Liberal Democrats	David Shepherd	541	31.8
Herne Bay First	John Dowle	274	16.1
Herne Bay First	Geoff Wimble	255	15.0
Labour	Brian Hunter	180	10.6
UKIP	Edith Bigg	118	6.9
Turnout		1700	
Conservative hold			
Conservative hold			

=== Westgate (3) ===
Westgate
Party	Candidate	Votes	%
Liberal Democrats	Stephen Dye	912	42.8
Liberal Democrats	James Flanagan	823	38.6
Liberal Democrats	Ida Linfield	805	37.7
Conservative	Joel Charles	685	32.1
Conservative	Ed Scates	667	31.3
Conservative	Robert Waters	658	30.8
Labour	Jean Butcher	353	16.5
Green	Elaine Godden	334	15.7
Labour	Jennie Bukht	319	15.0
Green	Geoffrey Meaden	302	14.2
Labour	John Jackson	283	13.3
Green	Sandy Wilson	259	12.1
Turnout		2133	
Liberal Democrats hold			
Liberal Democrats hold			
Liberal Democrats hold			

=== Wincheap (3) ===
Wincheap
Party	Candidate	Votes	%
Liberal Democrats	Nick Eden-Green*	1,254	58.4
Liberal Democrats	Charlotte MacCaul*	1,214	56.6
Liberal Democrats	Alex Perkins*	1,189	55.4
Conservative	Howard Smith	518	24.1
Conservative	Melanie Smith	492	22.9
Conservative	Stephanie Smith	465	21.7
Green	Keith Bothwell	290	13.5
Green	Marilyn Sansom	219	10.2
Green	Theo Smyth	211	9.8
Labour	Cecile Manning	203	9.5
Labour	Paul Todd	195	9.1
Labour	John Whyte	188	8.8
Turnout			
Liberal Democrats hold			
Liberal Democrats hold			
Liberal Democrats hold			
