= 2019 Canterbury City Council election =

Local election in Kent, England

- 2 May 2019

All 39 seats in the Canterbury City Council 20 seats needed for a majority
	First party	Second party	Third party
Party	Conservative	Labour	Liberal Democrats
Last election	31	3	3
Seats won	23	10	6
Seat change	▼8	▲7	▲3
- Map of the results of the 2019 Canterbury council election. Conservatives in blue, Labour in red and Liberal Democrats in yellow.
Council control before election
Conservative
Council control after election
Conservative

The 2019 Canterbury City Council election took place on 2 May 2019 to elect members of the Canterbury City Council in Kent, England. This was on the same day as other local elections. The Conservative Party retained overall control of the council.

== Summary ==
=== Election result ===
2019 Canterbury City Council election
Party	Candidates	Seats	Gains	Losses	Net gain/loss	Seats %	Votes %	Votes	+/−
Conservative	39	23	2	10	▼8	59.0	35.4	26,848	–3.4
Labour	39	10	7	0	▲7	25.6	29.4	22,279	+6.0
Liberal Democrats	34	6	3	0	▲3	15.4	19.7	14,972	+6.0
Green	24	0	0	0	Steady	0.0	12.5	9,502	+1.9
Independent	5	0	0	0	Steady	0.0	2.3	1,780	+2.0
UKIP	2	0	0	2	▼2	0.0	0.5	344	–12.5
Foundation	1	0	0	0	Steady	0.0	0.2	161	N/A

== Results by ward ==
=== Barton ===
Location of Barton ward

Barton (3 seats)
Party	Candidate	Votes	%	±%
Labour	Pat Edwards	958	35.4	+11.0
Labour	Connie Nolan	954	35.3	+11.4
Labour	Dave Wilson	805	29.8	+8.2
Liberal Democrats	Ida Linfield	795	29.4	+3.5
Liberal Democrats	Tom Hopkins	758	28.0	+6.4
Liberal Democrats	Martin Roche	670	24.8	+6.4
Conservative	Steven Williams	622	23.0	−3.2
Conservative	Len Brown	598	22.1	−4.7
Green	Stephen Peckham	586	21.7	+7.4
Conservative	Conor Dobbs	583	21.6	−4.5
Independent	Blue Cooper	233	8.6	N/A
Majority		10	0.4	
Registered electors		7,479		
Turnout		2,722	36	
Rejected ballots		19	0.7	
Labour gain from Conservative		Swing		
Labour gain from Conservative		Swing		
Labour gain from Conservative		Swing		

=== Beltinge ===
Location of Beltinge ward

Beltinge (2 seats)
Party	Candidate	Votes	%	±%
Conservative	Ian Stockley	938	50.2	+4.0
Conservative	Jeanette Stockley	921	49.3	+8.8
Green	Nicholas Gadsby	426	22.8	N/A
Liberal Democrats	Ann Anderson	388	20.8	N/A
Labour	Tom Mellish	314	16.8	−3.8
Labour	Christine Wheeldon	299	16.0	−7.0
Liberal Democrats	Christopher Palmer	193	10.3	N/A
Majority		495	26.5	
Registered electors		5,984		
Turnout		1,916	32	
Rejected ballots		49	2.6	
Conservative hold		Swing		
Conservative hold		Swing		

=== Blean Forest ===
Location of Blean Forest ward

Blean Forest (3 seats)
Party	Candidate	Votes	%	±%
Liberal Democrats	Alex Ricketts	612	31.6	+8.6
Conservative	Barbara Flack	583	30.1	−11.5
Liberal Democrats	Dan Smith	567	29.3	+10.7
Liberal Democrats	George Metcalfe	564	29.2	−2.4
Conservative	Benjamin Fitter-Harding	534	27.6	−7.9
Labour	Gethin Banks	454	23.5	−0.1
Conservative	Sergiu Barna	434	22.4	−9.2
Labour	Michael Prowse	429	22.2	+0.2
Green	Anna Peckham	425	22.0	+5.7
Labour	Ryan Smith	400	20.7	−0.1
Independent	Joe Egerton	328	17.0	N/A
Majority		3	0.2	
Registered electors		5,614		
Turnout		1,954	35	
Rejected ballots		20	1.0	
Liberal Democrats gain from Conservative		Swing		
Conservative hold		Swing		
Liberal Democrats gain from Conservative		Swing		

George Metcalfe was elected as a Conservative in 2015. The change in voteshare is shown from his result then, rather than the Liberal Democrat candidate.

=== Chartham and Stone Street ===
Location of Chartham and Stone Street ward

Chartham and Stone Street (2 seats)
Party	Candidate	Votes	%	±%
Conservative	Robert Thomas	900	37.3	+2.4
Conservative	Matthew Jones-Roberts	857	35.5	−5.3
Labour	Peter Forrest	665	27.6	+12.0
Labour	Lucas Pearce	648	26.9	+14.0
Green	Jay Day	525	21.8	+7.7
Liberal Democrats	James Galloway	410	17.0	−0.1
Liberal Democrats	Paul Smith	277	11.5	−0.7
UKIP	Brian MacDowall	220	9.1	−7.9
Majority		192	8.0	
Registered electors		5,637		
Turnout		2,426	43	
Rejected ballots		14	0.6	
Conservative hold		Swing		
Conservative hold		Swing		

=== Chestfield ===
Location of Chestfield ward

Chestfield (2 seats)
Party	Candidate	Votes	%	±%
Conservative	Jenny Samper	1,084	54.9	−0.2
Conservative	Pat Todd	1,071	54.3	+6.1
Liberal Democrats	Jonathan Dearth	342	17.3	+8.0
Liberal Democrats	Sarah Wehner	340	17.2	+10.4
Labour	Lynette Aitken	324	16.4	+1.2
Green	Nicole David	314	15.9	+6.7
Labour	Charlie Mower	257	13.0	−0.7
Majority		729	36.9	
Registered electors		5,738		
Turnout		2,013	35	
Rejected ballots		39	1.9	
Conservative hold		Swing		
Conservative hold		Swing		

=== Gorrell ===
Location of Gorrell ward

Gorrell (3 seats)
Party	Candidate	Votes	%	±%
Labour	George Caffery	1,418	42.3	+11.9
Labour	Chris Cornell	1,416	42.3	+15.0
Labour	Valerie Kenny	1,307	39.0	+12.0
Green	Alex Stevens	1,298	38.7	+23.8
Green	Jolyon Trimingham	894	26.7	+13.4
Conservative	Brian Baker	889	26.5	−6.1
Conservative	Derek Horne	707	21.1	−9.4
Conservative	Crispin Rampling	690	20.6	−2.9
Green	Beryl Wilson	638	19.0	+5.8
Liberal Democrats	Andrew Palmer	262	7.8	−1.0
Majority		9	0.3	
Registered electors		8,364		
Turnout		3,404	41	
Rejected ballots		53	1.6	
Labour gain from Conservative		Swing		
Labour gain from Conservative		Swing		
Labour hold		Swing		

=== Greenhill ===
Location of Greenhill ward

Greenhill
Party	Candidate	Votes	%	±%
Conservative	Dan Watkins	373	46.2	+11.3
Labour	Roger Dengate	201	24.9	−3.1
Foundation	David Hirst	161	20.0	−17.0
Green	Job Dexters	78	9.7	N/A
Majority		172	21.3	
Registered electors		3,082		
Turnout		819	27	
Rejected ballots		12	1.5	
Conservative gain from UKIP		Swing		

=== Herne & Broomfield ===
Location of Herne and Broomfield ward

Herne & Broomfield (2 seats)
Party	Candidate	Votes	%	±%
Conservative	Joe Howes	914	54.8	+8.1
Conservative	Anne Dekker	830	49.8	+9.5
Liberal Democrats	John Bowley	390	23.4	N/A
Labour	Karen Douglas	290	17.4	+1.2
Green	Elliot Settle	259	15.5	+5.8
Labour	Malcolm White	234	14.0	+1.1
Liberal Democrats	Jeremy Wilson	209	12.5	N/A
Majority		440	26.4	
Registered electors		6,357		
Turnout		1,723	27	
Rejected ballots		55	3.2	
Conservative hold		Swing		
Conservative hold		Swing		

=== Heron ===
Location of Heron ward

Heron (3 seats)
Party	Candidate	Votes	%	±%
Conservative	Andrew Cook	1,226	44.1	+2.8
Conservative	David Thomas	1,107	39.8	+7.6
Conservative	Steve Wilson-Hamilton	1,021	36.7	+3.2
Labour	Lynn Faux-Bowyer	703	25.3	+5.3
Green	Nathan Tough	658	23.7	+12.5
Labour	Gilbert House	618	22.2	+5.5
Labour	Luke Sullivan	593	21.3	+6.7
Independent	Michael Seymour	554	19.9	N/A
Liberal Democrats	Helen Sole	353	12.7	+1.2
Liberal Democrats	Cliff Arter	331	11.9	+2.6
Liberal Democrats	Graham Wood	306	11.0	+4.6
Majority		318	11.4	
Registered electors		9,698		
Turnout		2,825	29	
Rejected ballots		45	1.6	
Conservative hold		Swing		
Conservative hold		Swing		
Conservative hold		Swing		

=== Little Stour & Adisham ===
Location of Little Stour & Adisham

Little Stour & Adisham
Party	Candidate	Votes	%	±%
Conservative	Louise Jones-Roberts	549	41.5	−7.4
Liberal Democrats	Graham Duplock	351	26.5	+2.1
Labour	Kevin Power	228	17.2	+2.6
Green	Keith Bothwell	197	14.9	+2.9
Majority		198	15.0	
Registered electors		3,109		
Turnout		1,359	44	
Rejected ballots		35	2.6	
Conservative hold		Swing		

=== Nailbourne ===
Location of Nailbourne ward

Nailbourne
Party	Candidate	Votes	%	±%
Liberal Democrats	Michael Sole	831	49.9	
Conservative	Simon Cook	593	35.6	
UKIP	Mike Ferguson	124	7.4	
Labour	Evelyn Andrews	115	6.9	
Majority		238	14.3	
Registered electors		3,149		
Turnout		1,669	53	
Rejected ballots		4	0.2	
Liberal Democrats gain from Conservative		Swing		

=== Northgate ===
Location of Northgate ward

Northgate (2 seats)
Party	Candidate	Votes	%	±%
Labour	Alan Baldock	568	54.3	+12.7
Labour	Jean Butcher	520	49.7	+11.5
Conservative	Tom Barton	238	22.7	−9.3
Conservative	Jake Warman	220	21.0	−4.2
Green	Gillian Everatt	167	16.0	−7.5
Liberal Democrats	Valerie Ainscough	133	12.7	+0.1
Liberal Democrats	Brian McHenry	99	9.5	±0.0
Green	Jo Kidd	87	8.3	N/A
Majority		282	26.9	
Registered electors		3,837		
Turnout		1,058	28	
Rejected ballots		11	1.0	
Labour hold		Swing		
Labour hold		Swing		

=== Reculver ===
Location of Reculver ward

Reculver
Party	Candidate	Votes	%	±%
Conservative	Rachel Carnac	568	57.3	−13.7
Labour	Barbara Ayling	227	22.9	−6.1
Liberal Democrats	Monica Eden-Green	109	11.0	N/A
Green	Terry Thompson	88	8.9	N/A
Majority		341	34.4	
Registered electors		3,110		
Turnout		1,015	33	
Rejected ballots		23	2.3	
Conservative hold		Swing		

=== Seasalter ===
Location of Sealsalter ward

Seasalter (2 seats)
Party	Candidate	Votes	%	±%
Conservative	Ashley Clark	1,260	54.2	+13.1
Conservative	Colin Spooner	1,206	51.9	+17.3
Labour	Clare Connerton	557	24.0	+5.3
Labour	Helen Kirk	550	23.7	+7.7
Green	Kathy Nalson	455	19.6	+9.6
Liberal Democrats	John Brazier	223	9.6	+1.7
Liberal Democrats	Yvonne Hawkins	205	8.8	+1.6
Majority		649	27.9	
Registered electors		6,161		
Turnout		2,370	38	
Rejected ballots		45	1.9	
Conservative hold		Swing		
Conservative hold		Swing		

=== St Stephen's ===
Location of St Stephen's ward

St Stephen's (2 seats)
Party	Candidate	Votes	%	±%
Conservative	Terry Westgate	733	35.0	+5.8
Labour	Mel Dawkins	710	33.9	+7.5
Labour	Ben Hickman	659	31.5	+7.3
Conservative	Sally Waters	644	30.7	+3.1
Liberal Democrats	Nick Barnes	444	21.2	+3.7
Liberal Democrats	Neasa MacErlean	442	21.1	+8.1
Green	Tom Sharp	398	19.0	+1.1
Majority		51	2.4	
Registered electors		5,241		
Turnout		2,119	40	
Rejected ballots		24	1.1	
Conservative hold		Swing		
Labour gain from Conservative		Swing		

=== Sturry ===
Location of Sturry ward

Sturry (2 seats)
Party	Candidate	Votes	%	±%
Conservative	Georgina Glover	724	37.6	−5.8
Conservative	Louise Harvey-Quirke	678	35.2	−2.9
Labour	Amy Licence	487	25.3	+1.3
Green	Martin Baker	426	22.1	+8.1
Independent	Heather Taylor	426	22.1	−16.0
Labour	Jane McNicholl	398	20.7	+2.4
Green	Tim Palmer	397	20.6	+8.5
Majority		191	9.9	
Registered electors		5,932		
Turnout		1,952	33	
Rejected ballots		27	1.4	
Conservative hold		Swing		
Conservative hold		Swing		

=== Swalecliffe ===
Location of Swalecliffe ward

Swalecliffe
Party	Candidate	Votes	%	±%
Conservative	Ian Thomas	537	46.3	+9.4
Labour	Morag Warren	357	30.8	+6.4
Green	Julie Ellis	185	15.9	+10.6
Liberal Democrats	Archie Ratcliffe	81	7.0	−0.5
Majority		180	15.5	
Registered electors		3,281		
Turnout		1,198	37	
Rejected ballots		38	3.2	
Conservative hold		Swing		

=== Tankerton ===
Location of Tankerton ward

Tankerton
Party	Candidate	Votes	%	±%
Conservative	Neil Baker	437	34.4	−13.4
Liberal Democrats	James Flanagan	433	34.0	+19.4
Labour	Tricia Cooney	402	31.6	+8.0
Majority		4	0.3	
Registered electors		2,813		
Turnout		1,295	46	
Rejected ballots		23	1.8	
Conservative hold		Swing		

=== West Bay ===
Location of West Bay ward

West Bay
Party	Candidate	Votes	%	±%
Conservative	Peter Vickery-Jones	443	48.5	+8.8
Labour	Nigel Durrant	216	23.6	+3.0
Green	Roger Everatt	147	16.1	N/A
Liberal Democrats	Mary Hughes	108	11.8	N/A
Majority		227	24.8	
Registered electors		3,233		
Turnout		948	29	
Rejected ballots		34	3.6	
Conservative gain from UKIP		Swing		

=== Westgate ===
Location of Westgate ward

Westgate (2 seats)
Party	Candidate	Votes	%	±%
Liberal Democrats	Michael Dixey	884	40.3	+15.8
Labour	Gill Gower	802	36.5	+16.3
Labour	Simon Warley	763	34.7	+15.6
Liberal Democrats	Alex Lister	699	31.8	+9.5
Independent	Allen Tullet	239	10.9	N/A
Conservative	Oliver Feaver	227	10.3	−17.6
Green	Benjamin Grillet	220	10.0	−10.3
Conservative	Daniel Sydenham	214	9.7	−12.9
Green	Tom Williams	194	8.8	−7.7
Majority		39	1.8	
Registered electors		5,337		
Turnout		2,206	41	
Rejected ballots		10	0.5	
Liberal Democrats hold		Swing		
Labour gain from Conservative		Swing		

=== Wincheap ===
Location of Wincheap ward

Wincheap (2 seats)
Party	Candidate	Votes	%	±%
Liberal Democrats	Nick Eden-Green	1,201	47.9	+18.2
Liberal Democrats	Derek Maslin	962	38.4	+12.5
Labour	Zoila Santos	756	30.2	+5.3
Labour	Paul Todd	677	27.0	+7.7
Green	Pat Marsh	440	17.6	+2.5
Conservative	Susan Kilczewski	353	14.1	−5.5
Conservative	Christian Mills	342	13.7	−4.1
Majority		206	8.2	
Registered electors		6,016		
Turnout		2,524	42	
Rejected ballots		19	0.8	
Liberal Democrats hold		Swing		
Liberal Democrats hold		Swing		

== Changes 2019–2023 ==
- Terry Westgate, elected as a Conservative for St Stephen's, resigned from the party on 31 August 2021 after rebelling against the Conservative group in a vote on the council's future system of governance, and sat as an independent.
- Conservative councillor Barbara Flack of Blean Forest died in February 2023. The seat remained vacant until the 2023 election.
- Between February and April 2023, four Conservative councillors left the party – Colin Spooner (Seasalter) in February, Peter Vickery-Jones (West Bay) in March, Ashley Clark (Seasalter) in late March and Anne Dekker (Herne & Broomfield) in early April – and formed the Independent Serve to Lead Group, costing the Conservatives their majority on the council.

=== By-elections ===
==== Chestfield ====
The by-election was triggered by the death of Conservative councillor Jenny Samper in June 2019.

Chestfield: 19 September 2019
Party	Candidate	Votes	%	±%
Conservative	Ben Fitter-Harding	728	46.0	
Liberal Democrats	Peter Old	562	35.5	
Labour	Morag Warren	140	8.8	
Independent	Joe Egerton	84	5.3	
Green	Nicole David	68	4.3	
Majority		166	10.5	
Registered electors		5,733		
Turnout		1,594	27.80	
Rejected ballots		12	0.8	
Conservative hold		Swing		

==== Swalecliffe ====
The by-election was triggered by the death of Conservative councillor Ian Thomas in June 2020.

Swalecliffe: 6 May 2021
Party	Candidate	Votes	%	±%
Conservative	Mark Dance	616	42.6	−3.7
Green	Keith Bothwell	527	36.5	+20.6
Labour	Craig Potter	278	19.2	−11.6
Independent	Joseph Egerton	24	1.7	N/A
Majority		89	6.2	
Registered electors		3,253		
Turnout		1,451	44.57	
Rejected ballots		6	0.4	
Conservative hold		Swing	▼12.2	

==== Westgate ====
The by-election was held following the death of Labour councillor Gill Gower in February 2020.

Westgate: 6 May 2021
Party	Candidate	Votes	%	±%
Labour	Pip Hazelton	842	39.2	+5.4
Liberal Democrats	Alex Lister	661	30.8	−6.5
Conservative	Jake Warman	404	18.8	+9.2
Green	Terry Thompson	242	11.3	+2.0
Majority		181	8.4	
Registered electors		5,576		
Turnout		2,167	38.86	
Rejected ballots		14	0.6	
Labour hold		Swing	▲6.0	

==== Gorrell ====
A by-election was called after Labour councillor George Caffery resigned in September 2021.

Gorrell: 18 November 2021
Party	Candidate	Votes	%	±%
Green	Clare Turnbull	1,149	43.9	+10.3
Labour	Dane Buckman	803	30.7	−6.0
Conservative	Stephen Spencer	608	23.2	+0.2
Workers Party	Colin Gardner	58	2.2	New
Majority		346	13.2	N/A
Registered electors		8,346		
Turnout		2,627	31.47	
Rejected ballots		8	0.3	
Green gain from Labour		Swing	▲8.2	
