= Montana State University Billings =

Public university in Billings, Montana, US

Coordinates: 45°47′48″N 108°31′26″W

- Former names: Eastern Montana Normal School (1927–1949); Eastern Montana College of Education (1949–1965); Eastern Montana College (1965–1994)
- Type: Public university
- Established: 1927; 99 years ago
- Parent institution: Montana University System
- Accreditation: Northwest Commission on Colleges and Universities
- Academic affiliations: Space-grant
- Endowment: $41 million (2025)
- Chancellor: Stefani Hicswa
- Total staff: 522 (fall 2024)
- Students: 4,129 (fall 2024)
- Undergraduates: 3,881 (fall 2024)
- Postgraduates: 248 (fall 2024)
- Location: Billings, Montana, United States
- Campus: 110 acres; Downtown
- Colors: Blue & Yellow
- Nickname: Yellowjackets
- Sporting affiliations: NCAA Division II – GNAC
- Mascot: Buzz the Yellowjacket
- Website: msubillings.edu

Montana State University Billings (MSUB), also known as MSU Billings, is a public university in Billings, Montana, United States. It is the state's third largest university. Its campus is located on 110 acres in downtown Billings. Formerly Eastern Montana Normal School at its founding in 1927, the Normal School changed its name to Eastern Montana College of Education in 1949. It was again renamed in 1965 as Eastern Montana College (EMC). It merged into the Montana University System in 1994 under its present name. Currently, the university offers over 100 specialized programs for certificates, associate, bachelor's, and master's degrees through the university's five colleges. The five colleges of Montana State University Billings are Liberal Arts & Social Sciences, Business, Health Professions and Science, Education, and City College.

== Student life ==
Undergraduate demographics as of Fall 2023
Race and ethnicity	Total
White	76%
Hispanic	8%
Two or more races	6%
American Indian/Alaska Native	5%
International student	2%
Asian	1%
Black	1%
Unknown	1%
Economic diversity
Low-income (Note: The percentage of students who received an income-based federal Pell grant intended for low-income students.)	35%
Affluent (Note: The percentage of students who are a part of the American middle class at the bare minimum.)	65%

With the main campus in the downtown core of Billings many cultural, service, athletic or educational activities are within walking distance of the campus. The school is host to a mix of traditional and nontraditional students. Approximately 400 students live on campus in the residence halls.

Some of the major student organizations include:

- The Associated Students of Montana State University Billings, also known as the student government. This organization is run by and for students, taking in concerns, advocating student issues and rights, and allocating funds.
- Student Activities Board, the organizers of many activities from comedians to current movies on campus.
- Student religious organizations including United Campus Ministry representing 7 Protestant denominations, other Christian non-denominational organizations, Baha'i, and Catholic groups.
- Jacket Student Ambassadors, a student leadership organization on campus which hosts many new student orientations and tours of the campus.
- The Residence Hall Association, a student run residence hall association that provides both social and educational programming for residents of Petro and Rimrock Hall.

=== Major structures of the main campus ===
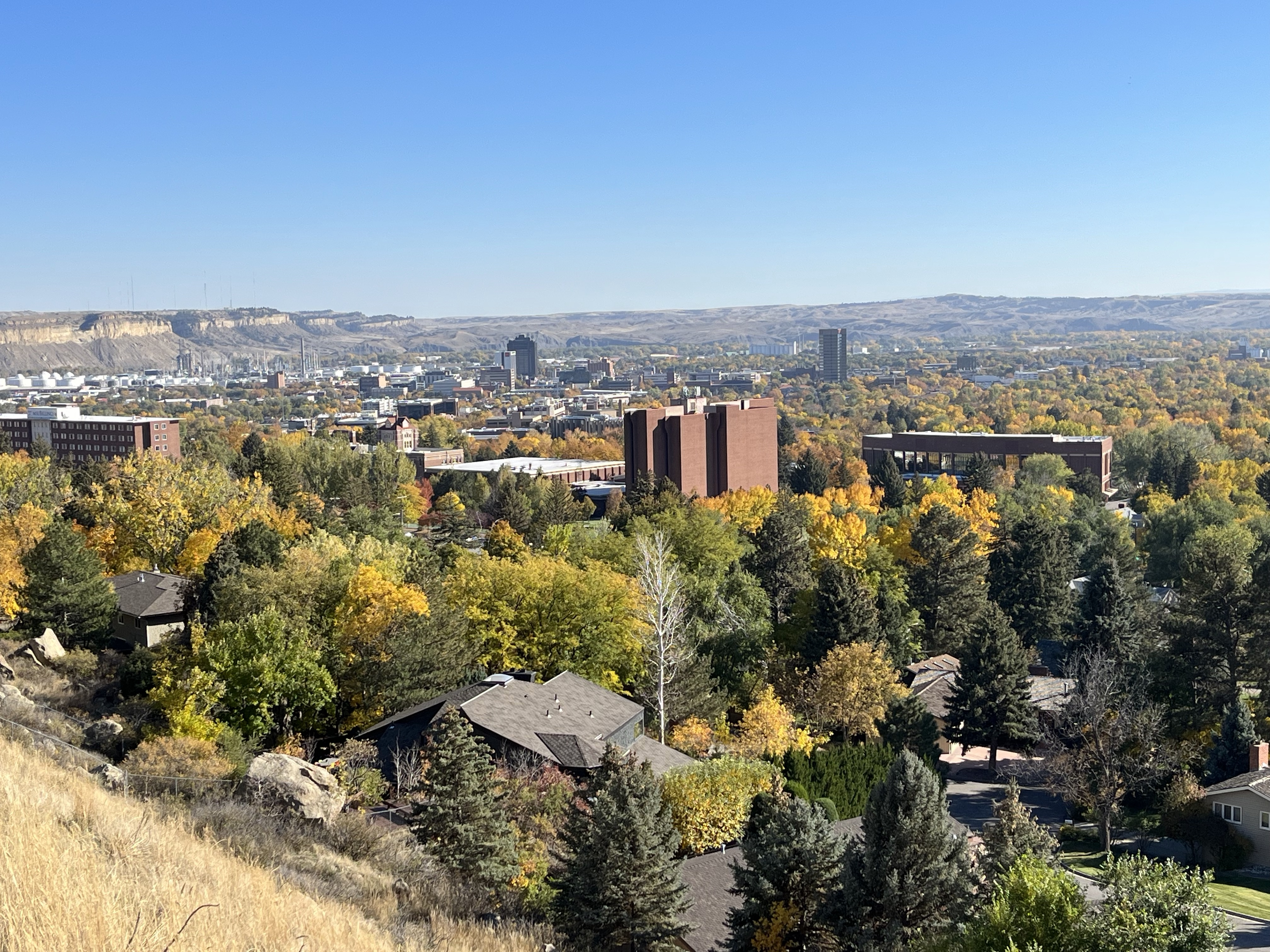
Main campus sits at the base of the Rimrocks

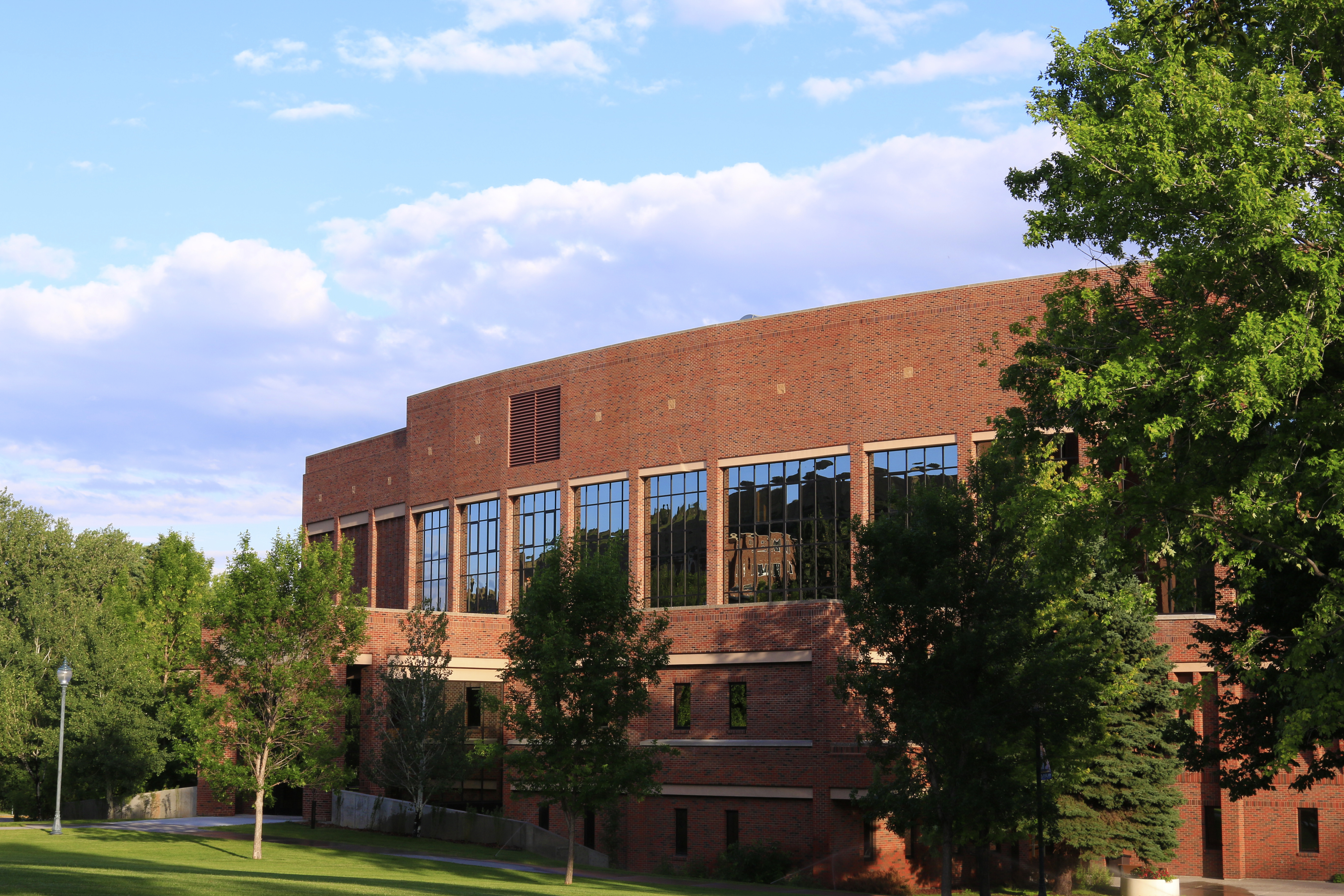
College of Education

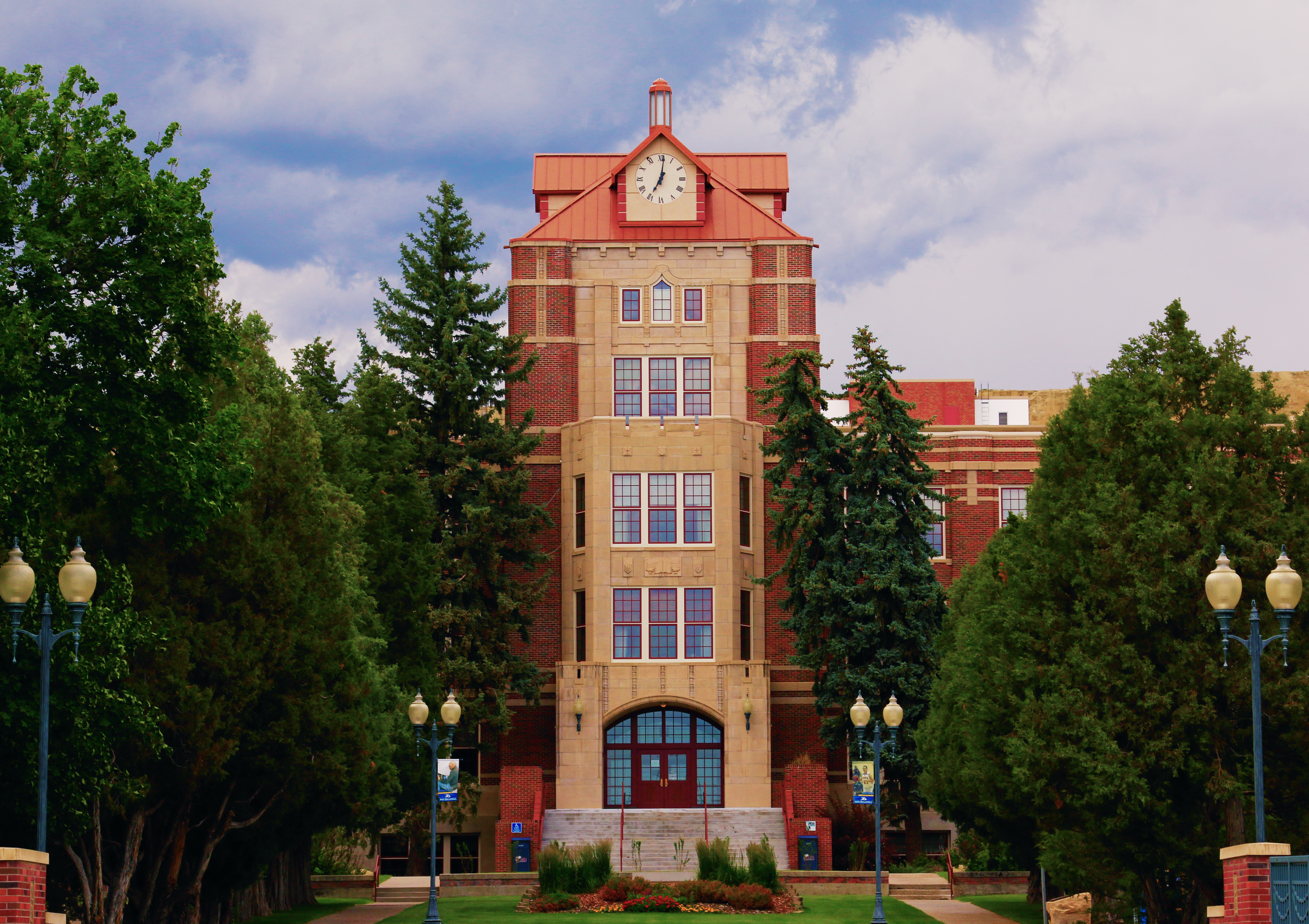
McMullen Hall

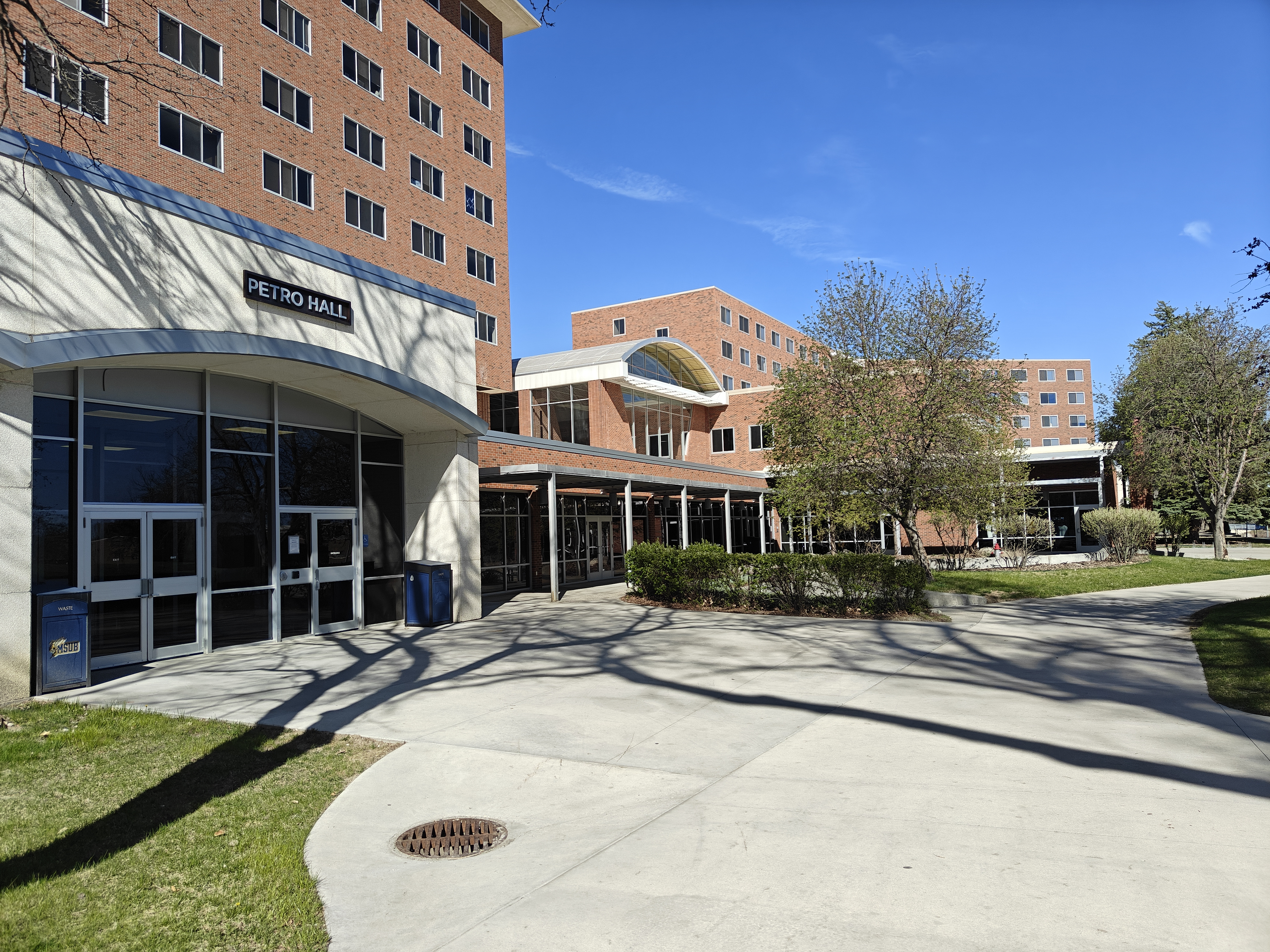
Petro & Rimrock Halls

- Parking Garage / Campus Police
- Art Annex
- Apsaruke Hall
- Cisel Hall
- Alterowitz Arena / Physical Ed Building
- Avitus Group Stadium
- Tennis Courts
- Rimrock Hall
- Petro Hall
- McMullen Hall
- Student Union
- Library
- Liberal Arts Building
- Yellowstone Science & Health Building
- College of Education

=== Petro Hall ===
Petro Hall is a 500-room residence hall completed in 1965. There are 8 floors, including the first floor Petro Theater and the second floor lobby. It is connected directly to the Petro Theater on the first floor, and also connected to the Student Union Building.

=== Rimrock Hall ===
Rimrock Hall is 300-room residence hall completed in 1962. There are 6 floors, including the second floor lobby and the first floor Student Union Building.

=== Student family housing ===
The student family housing consists of contemporary two and three bedroom units located on the east end of the campus.

== Athletics ==
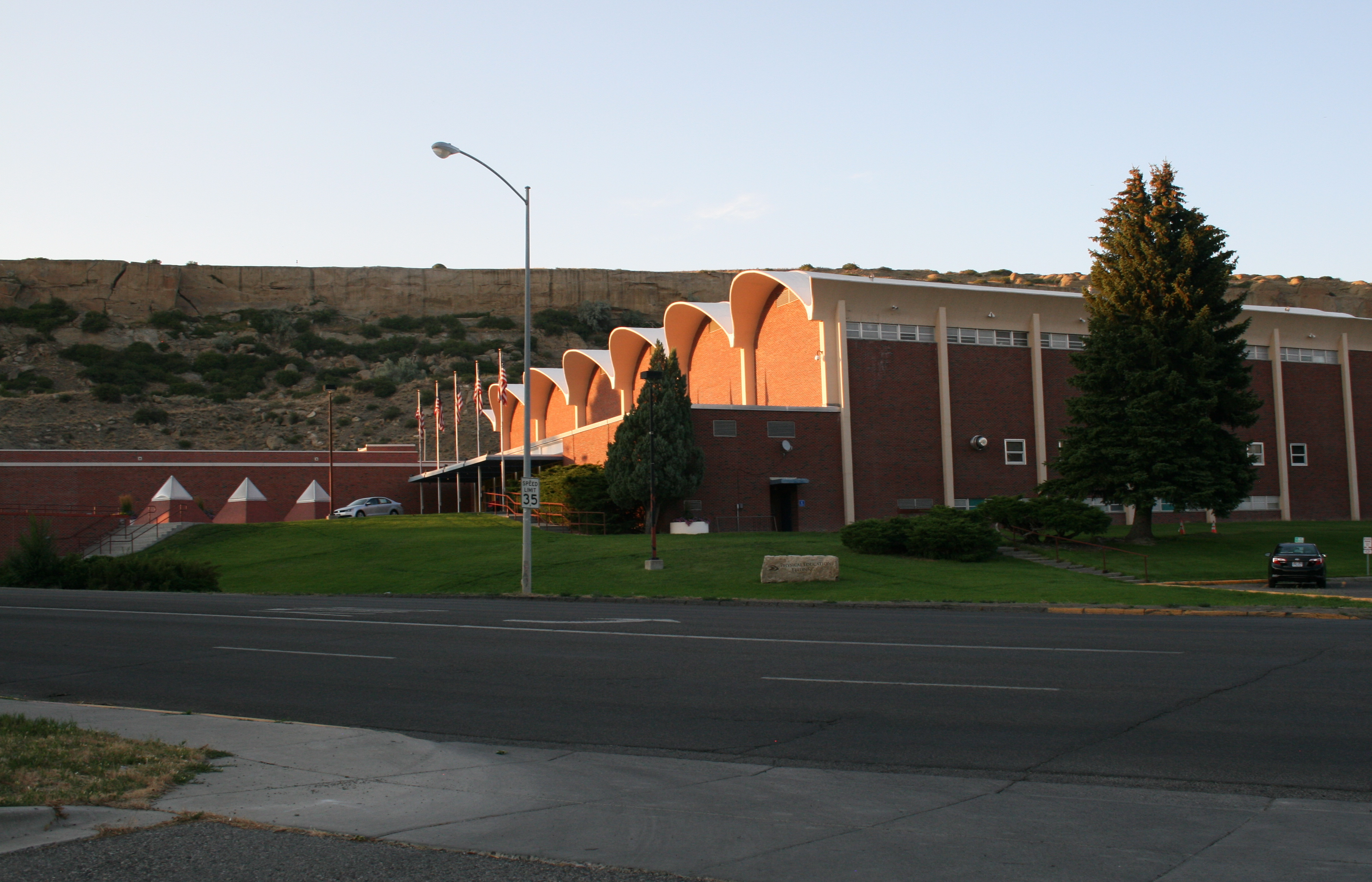
Alterowitz Arena

The Montana State–Billings (MSUB) athletic teams are called the Yellowjackets. The university is a member of the NCAA Division II ranks, primarily competing in the Great Northwest Athletic Conference (GNAC) since the 2007–08 academic year. The Yellowjackets previously competed in the D-II Heartland Conference from 2005–06 to 2006–07; in the D-II Pacific West Conference (PacWest; formerly known as the Great Northwest Conference until after the 1991–92 school year) from 1982–83 to 2004–05; as an NCAA D-II Independent from 1980–81 to 1981–82; and in the Frontier Conference of the National Association of Intercollegiate Athletics (NAIA) from 1933–34 to 1979–80.

MSUB competes in 16 intercollegiate varsity sports: Men's sports include baseball, basketball, cross country, golf, soccer and track & field; while women's sports include basketball, cross country, golf, soccer, softball, track & field, triathlon and volleyball; and co-ed sports include cheerleading and stunt. The official MSUB song is the Fight Song. Former sports included football.

=== History ===
Formerly known as Eastern Montana College, MSUB athletics started back to the 1927–28 school year, the year in which the university was founded. The Yellowjackets have competed in a number of different conferences throughout the years, and prior to the 1980–81 season, the athletic department transitioned from the NAIA to competing at the NCAA Division II level.

=== Baseball ===
In the 2018–19 school year, the MSUB baseball team captured its fourth GNAC regular-season title in five years, won its first-ever GNAC tournament title, and advanced to the NCAA D2 West Region Championships for the first time in program history. MSUB broke numerous school and conference baseball records, including most wins in a season with 33, and most home runs in a year with 83. The baseball program captured four regular season GNAC championships over a span of five years (2015, 2016, 2018, 2019).

=== Women's basketball ===
The 2017–18 academic year was historic and was highlighted by an NCAA Division II Elite Eight appearance in women's basketball. The Yellowjackets won the West Region title for the second time in program history, matching the achievement of the 1998–99 regional champion squad. The women's team has been GNAC champions ten times since 1987.

=== Softball ===
The Yellowjackets won the 2015 GNAC Softball Championships and advanced all the way to the semifinals of the NCAA Division II West Region Championships. The team were also GNAC champions in 2009 and 2012.

== Extensions ==
=== City College at Montana State University Billings ===
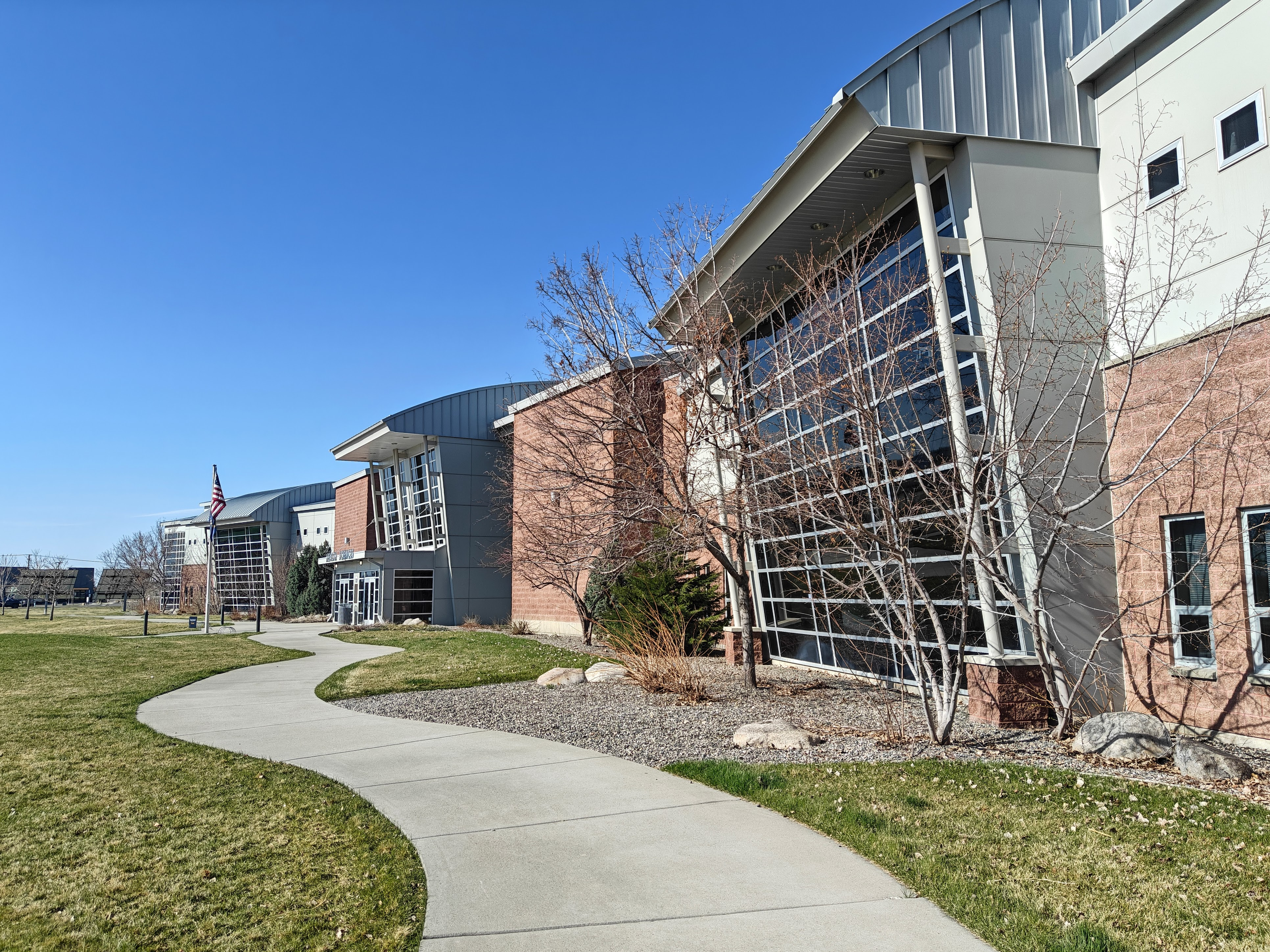
Health Science Building at City College

City College at MSU Billings is a two-year college that offers degrees and certifications in fields such as business, computer technology, health and safety, industry and transportation. It was first created in 1969 as the Billings Vocational-Technical Education Center (BVTC). Its governance was passed from the Billings School District to the Montana University System (MUS) Board of Regents in 1987, and in 1994, the BVTC was officially merged with MSU Billings and renamed the College of Technology. The name was changed to the present name in 2012 when the MUS Board of Regents voted to change the names of all the colleges of technology in the state.

=== Distance learning ===
MSUB Online is Montana State University Billings' Online Portal, featuring a wide array of courses and complete programs of study including certificates and associate degrees, bachelor's degrees, and master's degrees.

== Notable alumni ==
- James F. Battin (Class of 1948), US Representative and federal judge
- Chet Blaylock (Class of 1948), State Senator, delegate to Montana constitutional convention, Montana gubernatorial candidate
- Edward Butcher (Class of 1965), Montana state legislator
- Melony G. Griffith (Class of 1985), former member of the Maryland House of Delegates, member of the Maryland State Senate
- Kristin Korb (Class of 1992), American jazz double bassist and vocalist
- Dustin Lind, director of hitting and assistant hitting coach for the San Francisco Giants
- Monica Lindeen (Class of 1992), Montana House District 43, US Congress candidate '06, former Montana State Auditor
- Judy Martz, 22nd Governor of Montana
- Roy McPipe (Class of 1974), Drafted by the NBA in '73 and '74, played with the ABA's Utah Stars in 1975
- Kevin Red Star (Native American artist)
- Jon Sonju (Class of 1997), former Montana state senator and representative
- Bently Spang (Class of 1991), Northern Cheyenne multidisciplinary artist
- Susan Watters (Class of 1980), United States District Judge of the US District Court for the District of Montana, first female judge to serve in the District of Montana

== See also ==
- List of college athletic programs in Montana
