= Anthony Lewis (disambiguation) =

Anthony Lewis (1927–2013) was an American intellectual and columnist for The New York Times.

Anthony Lewis may also refer to:

- Anthony Lewis (musician) (1915–1983), English conductor, composer, editor, and academic
- Anthony Lewis (English cricketer) (1932–2026), English cricketer
- Anthony Lewis (Trinidadian cricketer) (born 1949), Trinidadian cricketer
- Tony Lewis (born 1938), Welsh cricketer and cricket commentator
- Tony Lewis (mathematician) (1942–2020), British cricket statistician
- Tony Lewis (musician) (1957–2020), English singer-songwriter and former vocalist and bassist for The Outfield
- Anthony Lewis (illustrator) (born 1966), British children's illustrator
- Anthony Lewis (baseball) (born 1971), American baseball player
- Anthony Lewis (actor) (born 1983), British actor
- Tony J. Lewis (1958–2017), West Virginia state legislator
- Tony Lewis (speedway rider) (1923–1997), British speedway rider
- M. Anthony Lewis, American robotics researcher
- Antony Lewis, cosmologist and software developer
- Tony Lewis (The 10th Kingdom), a character from The 10th Kingdom
