= Mission Viejo Vigilantes =

- 1997–1998; Mission Viejo, California

Minor league affiliations
- Class: Independent
- League: Western Baseball League
- Division: South

Team data
- Ballpark: Saddleback College Baseball Field

The Mission Viejo Vigilantes were a minor league baseball team located in Mission Viejo, California. The team played in the independent Western Baseball League, and was not affiliated with any Major League Baseball team.

== History ==
The Vigilantes were founded in 1997 when the Long Beach Barracudas moved to Mission Viejo. The team was owned by Pat Elster, brother of MLB shortstop Kevin Elster, along with former USC Trojan's women's basketball player Paula Pyers. Former California Angels catcher and manager Buck Rodgers was signed to manage the club.

In their inaugural season, the Vigilantes finished last in the South division at 39-51, but drew 92,960 fans, third-most in the eight-team league, despite playing out of a makeshift ballpark set up on the campus of Saddleback College.

A 4,500-seat ballpark was proposed at a cost of $6 million scheduled to open in 1998. However, the project was initially scaled back and the stadium's expected opening was pushed back to 1999. Amidst the backdrop of this uncertainty, the Vigilantes finished 49-41, tied for the second-best record in the Western League. Unfortunately, the three best teams all resided in the South and only two reached the playoffs; the Vigilantes lost the tiebreaker to the Sonoma County Crushers and missed the postseason.

Despite this on-field success, attendance dropped to 80,208, fourth in the league. Ultimately, stadium talks broke down and the stadium was never built. With no prospects of a permanent home, the Vigilantes ceased operations after the 1998 season.

== Notable players ==
- Bret Barberie (1997)
- Carl Nichols (1997)
- Wally Ritchie (1998)
- Buck Rodgers (Manager, 1997–98)
- Jim Rushford (1997); Reached majors in 2002 for Milwaukee Brewers
