= Gesa Stadium =

Baseball stadium in Pasco, Washington

- Location within Washington State Location within the United States
- Former names: Posse Stadium; Tri-City Stadium; Dust Devils Stadium
- Address: 6200 Burden Boulevard
- Location: Pasco, Washington, U.S.
- Coordinates: 46.267°N 119.172°W
- Owner: City of Pasco
- Operator: Tri-City Dust Devils
- Capacity: 3,654
- Surface: Natural grass
- Field size: Left Field – 335 ft (102 m); Center Field – 400 ft (122 m); Right Field – 335 ft (102 m)

Construction
- Groundbreaking: 1993
- Opened: 1995; 31 years ago

Tenants
- Tri-City Dust Devils (NWL) (2001–present); Tri-City Posse (WBL) (1995–2000)

Gesa Stadium (formerly Dust Devils Stadium) is a Minor League Baseball park in the northwest United States, located in Pasco, Washington. Opened 31 years ago in 1995, it is the home field of the Tri-City Dust Devils of the Northwest League.

== History ==
The venue opened as "Tri-City Stadium" for the Tri-City Posse, a charter member of the independent Western Baseball League (WBL). After six years, the Posse left after the 2000 season when the NWL Rockies moved up the Columbia River from Portland to become the Tri-City Dust Devils for 2001. (The Rockies moved to make way for a new incarnation of the Beavers in the Triple-A Pacific Coast League.)

It was renamed "Dust Devils Stadium" in 2004 and became Gesa Stadium in 2008, when Gesa Credit Union, a local financial institution, announced that they had purchased the naming rights to the facility for a duration of ten years.

In early 2007, the stadium underwent a renovation, which a 137-foot (42 m) sunshade was constructed on the northwest-side of the stadium behind the right-field stands, to help shade spectators on the left-field stands from the glare of the setting sun. Gesa Stadium has an unorthodox southern alignment, so that fans could have sight of the Kennewick area and the surrounding Horse Heaven Hills, particularly Jump Off Joe. The recommended alignment of a baseball diamond (home plate to center field) is east-northeast.

The elevation of the playing field is approximately 500 feet (150 m) above sea level and is just north of Interstate 182, several miles west of the Tri-Cities Airport.

== Previous venues ==
The previous ballparks for minor league baseball in the area were in the other two cities, and both were aligned northeast.

Sanders-Jacobs Field (1950–1974) in Kennewick was located at the northeast corner of Clearwater Avenue and Neel Street in the West Highlands (46.213°N 119.169°W). Used for a quarter century, its third base line followed present-day Morain Street. It was named for Harry Sanders, a Connell farmer, and Tom Jacobs, a former manager and the general manager of the Atoms at the time of his death at age 64 in 1968. The independent Tri-City Ports folded after the 1974 season, and the venue was demolished soon after.

In Richland, the baseball field at Richland High School, adjacent to the Bomber Bowl, was used for the Tri-Cities Triplets' four seasons in the mid-1980s. The team was sold after the 1986 season, moved to southwestern Idaho, and became the Boise Hawks.
