= Bret Barberie =

American baseball player (born 1967)

- Second baseman
- Born: August 16, 1967 (age 58); Long Beach, California, U.S.
- Batted: Switch Threw: Right

MLB debut
- June 16, 1991, for the Montreal Expos

Last MLB appearance
- June 22, 1996, for the Chicago Cubs

MLB statistics
- Batting average: .271
- Home runs: 16
- Runs batted in: 133
- Stats at Baseball Reference

Teams
- Montreal Expos (1991–1992); Florida Marlins (1993–1994); Baltimore Orioles (1995); Chicago Cubs (1996)
Medals
Baseball
Representing the United States
Olympic Games
Gold medal – first place	1988 Seoul	Team
Baseball World Cup
Silver medal – second place	1988 Rome	Team

Bret Edward Barberie (born August 16, 1967) is an American former professional baseball infielder. He played in Major League Baseball for the Montreal Expos, Florida Marlins, Baltimore Orioles, and Chicago Cubs. Before his professional career, Barberie attended the University of Southern California (USC) and played college baseball for the USC Trojans, and played for the United States national baseball team in the 1988 Summer Olympics and the 1988 Baseball World Cup.

== Amateur career ==
Barberie attended Gahr High School in Cerritos, California, and played for the school's baseball team. He enrolled at the Cerritos College and transferred to the University of Southern California (USC) and played college baseball for the USC Trojans baseball team in the Pacific-10 Conference. In 1988, Barberie was named to the All-Pacific-10 Conference's first team. In the summer, Barberie was a member of the United States national baseball team, playing in the 1988 Summer Olympics, winning the gold medal, and the 1988 Baseball World Cup, winning the silver medal.

== Professional career ==
The Montreal Expos selected Barberie in the seventh round of the 1988 Major League Baseball (MLB) Draft. Barberie made his major league debut with the Expos on June 16, 1991. He had a .353 batting average in 136 at-bats for the Expos in the 1991 season. With Delino DeShields serving as the Expos' starting second baseman, the Expos played Barberie as their third baseman in 1992, as the Expos moved Tim Wallach to first base. He struggled in the 1992 season, was demoted to the minor leagues during the season, and finished with a .232 batting average for the Expos.

The Florida Marlins, an expansion team, selected Barberie from the Expos in the 1992 MLB expansion draft; he was the third player chosen by the Marlins. He was a member of the inaugural Marlins team that began play in Major League Baseball in 1993. He recorded the first hit in Marlins franchise history, a single off of Orel Hersheiser, on Opening Day. Barberie had a .277 batting average in the 1993 season. In May 1994, Barberie got chili pepper juice in his eye when putting in his contact lenses, was temporarily blinded, and missed that day's game as a result. Barberie led the National League in errors committed by a second baseman in 1994. Though he also had a .301 batting average, the Marlins acquired Quilvio Veras to replace Barberie as their second baseman after the 1994 season, and traded Barberie to the Baltimore Orioles for Jay Powell. He started at second base for the Orioles through June 4, but he struggled and was replaced as their starting second baseman with Manny Alexander.

Barberie became a free agent after the 1995 season and signed with the Chicago Cubs for the 1996 season. The Cubs invited Barberie to spring training as a non-roster player. He began the 1996 season with the Iowa Cubs of the Class AAA Pacific Coast League (PCL), and was promoted to the Cubs in May. In 1997, Barberie played for the Mission Viejo Vigilantes of the independent Western Baseball League. The next season, Barberie played for the Oklahoma City RedHawks of the PCL, an affiliate of the Texas Rangers.

== Personal life ==
Barberie's father, Edward, played professional baseball in the minor leagues. Bret is the former husband of Jillian Barberie, a Canadian television hostess, sportscaster, radio personality and actress. The couple married in 1996 and divorced in 2002.

Barberie enjoys surfing. He began surfing at the age of 12 on a family vacation to San Diego. Barberie owns and operates a baseball facility in Santa Clarita, California.
