= Red Baldwin =

American baseball player (1894–1956)

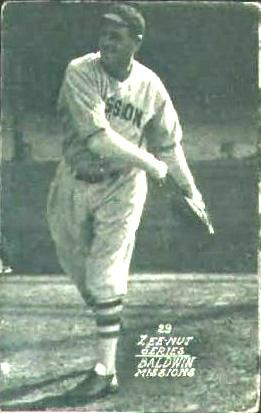
- Catcher
- Born: September 1, 1894; Oakland, California, U.S.
- Died: January 1, 1956 (aged 61); Alameda, California, U.S.
- Batted: Right Threw: Right

Professional debut
- Northwestern League: 1916, for the Tacoma Tigers
- Pacific Coast League: 1917, for the Portland Beavers

Last appearance
- 1931, for the San Francisco Seals

Career statistics
- Batting average: .259
- Hits: 996
- At-bats: 3845

Teams
- Tacoma Tigers (1916); Spokane Indians (1917); Portland Beavers (1917); San Francisco Seals (1919, 1931); Seattle Indians (1920, 1924–26); Los Angeles Angels (1921–23); Mission Bells/Reds (1927–30)

Career highlights and awards
- 3× Pacific Coast League pennant winner (1921, 1924, 1931)

Earl Philips "Red" Baldwin (September 1, 1894 – January 1, 1956) was an American professional baseball catcher who spent 15 seasons in the minor leagues. Baldwin's entire career playing for team on the West Coast of the United States, mostly in the Pacific Coast League (PCL). His career began in the Northwestern League in 1916. Baldwin broke into the PCL in 1917 after being traded to the Portland Beavers. His baseball career took a hiatus during the 1918 season during his service in the 91st Division of the United States Army during World War I. He returned to baseball in 1919 and played in the PCL for the next 11 seasons. During that time, he played for the San Francisco Seals (1919, 1931), the Seattle Indians (1920, 1924–26), the Los Angeles Angels (1921–23) and the Mission Bells/Reds (1927–30).

== Professional career ==
=== Northwestern League and Portland Beavers (1916–17) ===
Under the recommendation of former player Jim Byrnes, the Vancouver Beavers of the Northwestern League (NWL) invited Baldwin to try out for the club but was not offered a contract. Instead, Baldwin signed with the Tacoma Tigers. He finished the season with a .242 batting average with 39 hits in 161 at bats.

Before start of the 1917 season, Baldwin negotiated his way out of his contract with Tacoma. After he became a free agent, the Portland Beavers of the Pacific Coast League offered him a contract. However, Baldwin signed with the NWL Spokane Indians. In early June, Baldwin was traded to the Portland Beavers in exchange for Bill Stumpf and Gus Helfrich. Baldwin's batting average with Spokane was .302 with two home runs. Baldwin arrived in Portland on June 10. Roscoe Fawcett, the sports editor of The Oregonian, wrote on June 24 that, "'Red' Baldwin behind the bat doesn't seem to be able to hit a lick. He is a nifty receiver, but helpless on offense". With Portland that season, Baldwin batted .219 with five doubles and two triples.

=== Army service and semi-pro baseball (1917–18) ===
After the 1917 season, Baldwin signed with a winter league club based out of San Francisco, California named "Maxwell". He also played for a semi-professional team named the Oakland Native Sons. In October 1917, Baldwin was drafted to serve in World War I as a member of the United States Army. Baldwin did not claim exemptions to his draft. In November, Baldwin was informed to report to Camp Lewis near Tacoma, Washington. He wrote The Oregonian in December and said he was not sure where he would be deployed, but thought it would likely be France or Italy. As a member of the 91st Division, Baldwin served in France during the Battle of Saint-Mihiel and the Meuse-Argonne Offensive from 1917 to 1918.

I thought I would drop you a line to give you an idea of this life before we leave [Camp Lewis]. We are all ready to go some place, but where I don't know. This life sure keeps me in shape. [...] There is just one thing that is tough, and that is getting up on 5:45 in the morning. I don't see why they should get up so early, but I guess Uncle [Sam] knows his business."

— Red Baldwin, The Oregonian (December 13, 1917)

Following the 1918 season, the New York Yankees selected Baldwin in the rule 5 draft, but he was unable to report to the team due to his service in World War I. The Portland Beavers's owner Judge McCredie claimed the Yankees failed to pay the arranged draft price for Baldwin, who was still under contract with the Beavers while serving in the U.S. Army. The case was reviewed by the National Commission and eventually the Yankees were allowed to sign Baldwin.

=== Pacific Coast League journeyman (1919–31) ===
After returning home from service in World War I, Baldwin reported to the New York Yankees spring training camp at the start of the 1919 season. However, he was cut from the roster before the start of the regular season and signed with the San Francisco Seals of the PCL. He played 82 games for the Seals and finished with a .217 batting average with 11 doubles, one triple and two home runs.

Before the 1920 season, Baldwin was negotiating to re-sign with the San Francisco Seals, but they did not reach an agreement. The Seattle Indians offered Baldwin $500 a month, which he accepted. On the season, Baldwin appeared in 108 games and batted .240 with 12 doubles and two triples. Baldwin requested another $500 a month contract from the Seattle Indians, which they declined instead offering him $400 a month. He eventually signed with Seattle for an undisclosed amount.

Baldwin was traded to the Los Angeles Angels before the start of the 1921 season in exchange for Curly Brown. Baldwin was the team's first string catcher that season. He played 108 games that season and batted .266 with 18 doubles, six triples and one home run. In his second season with the Angels, Baldwin appeared in 91 games and batted in .293 with 90 hits, 18 doubles and two home runs. Baldwin played his final season with Los Angeles in 1923. He appeared in 101 games with 32 doubles and two home runs.

Following the 1923 season, Los Angeles sold Baldwin to the Seattle Indians. During the 1924 season, he batted .282 with 31 doubles, 10 triples and 10 home runs. His double and home run totals were a career high. In 1925, Baldwin batted .269 with 16 doubles, one triple and six home runs. Baldwin's batting statistics for 1926 are not available.

The Seattle Indians sold Baldwin to the Mission Bells in exchange for $3,000. In his first season for Mission, Baldwin did not make a plate appearance. He played in 17 games on defense. In 1928, he appeared in 118 games and finished with a .277 with 18 double, one triple and three home runs. His final season with Mission was in 1930. That year, he batted .247 with 10 double, one triple and three home runs.

Baldwin signed with the San Francisco Seals in 1931. His contract stipulated that Baldwin would be paid for the entire season, regardless how much he played. He played 65 games with eight doubles and two triples in what would be his final season in professional baseball.

=== Relatives ===
Baldwin's brother-in-law was William Lawrence Plummer, who played with Baldwin from 1924 to 1925 on the Seattle Indians. His nephew, Bill Plummer, was a major league catcher from 1968 to 1978, and pro baseball manager and coach from 1980 to 2017 with the Seattle Mariners, Colorado Rockies, Detroit Tigers, Cincinnati Reds, and Arizona Diamondbacks organizations as well as the independent Chico Heat and Yuma Bullfrogs.
