= Steve Yeager =

American baseball catcher and coach (born 1948)

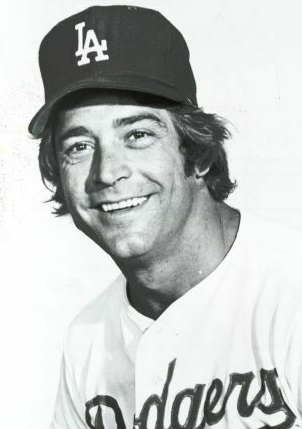
- Yeager with the Los Angeles Dodgers in 1983
- Catcher
- Born: November 24, 1948 (age 77); Huntington, West Virginia, U.S.
- Batted: Right Threw: Right

MLB debut
- August 2, 1972, for the Los Angeles Dodgers

Last MLB appearance
- August 29, 1986, for the Seattle Mariners

MLB statistics
- Batting average: .228
- Home runs: 102
- Runs batted in: 410
- Stats at Baseball Reference

Teams
- Los Angeles Dodgers (1972–1985); Seattle Mariners (1986)

Career highlights and awards
- World Series champion (1981); World Series MVP (1981)

Stephen Wayne Yeager (born November 24, 1948) is an American former professional baseball catcher. Yeager spent 14 of the 15 seasons of his Major League Baseball career, from 1972 through 1985, with the Los Angeles Dodgers. His last year, 1986, he played for the Seattle Mariners. From 2012 to 2018, Yeager was the catching coach for the Dodgers. He was co-MVP of the 1981 World Series.

== Early and personal life ==
Yeager was born in Huntington, West Virginia. He attended Meadowdale High School in Dayton, Ohio. Yeager hit two grand slams in a single game while playing for Meadowdale.

He is the cousin of the late test pilot Chuck Yeager. Los Angeles Mayor Tom Bradley was the best man at his wedding to local rock musician Gloria Giaone. Yeager is Jewish, having converted to Judaism when his career was over. He later moved to Granada Hills, California.

== Minor league career ==
The Los Angeles Dodgers selected Yeager in the fourth round of the 1967 Major League Baseball draft. After one game with the rookie level Ogden Spikers of the Pioneer League, Yeager was sent to the Dodgers' Single-A affiliate, the Dubuque Packers of the Midwest League. The following season, in 1968, Yeager played 59 games for the Single-A Daytona Beach Dodgers of the Florida State League. In 1969, he played 22 games for the Bakersfield Dodgers, the Dodgers' Single-A affiliate in the California League, where he threw out 26 runners from behind the plate. That season he suffered a fractured leg in a first-inning collision with a Reno Silver Sox Player (Ron Pietila) at home plate, but was not aware how bad his injury was, and finished the game.

Yeager was promoted to Double-A before the end of the 1969 season, playing in one game for the Albuquerque Dodgers of the Texas League. He spent the next two-and-2/3 seasons with the Double-A franchise. In 162 games played over the 1970 and 1971 seasons, he hit .276, with 77 RBIs in 490 at bats. He threw out 84 runners, second in the league that year, and was named to the Texas League All-Star team as a catcher in 1971.

In spring training in 1972 he won the Dodgers writers' Dearie Mulvey Memorial Trophy as the best rookie. With the Dukes becoming the new Pacific Coast League Triple-A affiliate for the Dodgers in 1972, Yeager was promoted while remaining in Albuquerque for another season. “You won't beat that arm of his,” Tommy Lasorda said that season. With the Triple-A Dukes, he played 82 games, batting .280 with 45 RBIs and a slugging percentage of .502, in 257 at bats.

== Major league career ==
=== Los Angeles Dodgers (1972–1985) ===
Yeager made his Major League debut with the Dodgers on August 2, 1972, and went on to play 15 seasons in the major leagues. He started 34 games that season and batted .274/.374/.406. In the winter before the 1973 season he was named to the Dominican League All Star team. He backed up Joe Ferguson in 1973, and split time with Ferguson for the pennant-winning 1974 club as he hit .266 with 12 home runs. Thereafter, Yeager was the starting catcher for the Dodgers and became an integral part of the Dodgers' success in the 1970s and early 1980s.

In 1976, he led NL catchers in assists, with 77. In 1977, he came in second in voting for the Gold Glove Award. He led NL catchers in baserunners caught stealing percentage in both 1978 (46.7%) and 1982 (43.1%).

Yeager helped the Dodgers get to the World Series in 1974, 1977, 1978, and 1981. In the '81 Series against the New York Yankees, he shared the World Series Most Valuable Player award with teammates Pedro Guerrero and Ron Cey. Yeager, who was backing up Mike Scioscia by that time, did not have overwhelming stats for the Series, as he went 4-for-14 (.286), but one of his hits was a double and two were home runs. One of the homers, off Ron Guidry, turned out to be the game-winner in Game 5.

While with the Dodgers, Yeager caught Jerry Reuss' no-hitter on June 27, 1980.

Yeager injured his knee in 1982 and broke his wrist the next year, which severely limited his playing time.

=== Seattle Mariners (1986) ===
He was traded from the Dodgers to the Seattle Mariners for Ed Vande Berg on December 11, 1985. He retired after hitting .208 in 130 at bats in 1986.

=== Characteristics ===
Lou Brock called Yeager "the best-throwing catcher in the game." His specialty was defense and his command of the game on the field. In one nationally televised game, he made a putout to second base – and the radar gun in place to record pitches caught his throw to second (from a crouch) at 98 mph. He was very good at managing the game from his position and was even more highly regarded for his abilities with young pitchers. In 1974, he had 806 putouts, the most in the National League. This compensated for his overall subpar offense, as illustrated by arguably his best offensive year occurring in 1974 when he batted .266 in fewer than 100 games. Despite this reputation, Yeager was still somewhat of a clutch hitter as he had an average of .321 when hitting with the bases loaded during his career, as well as hitting 4 home runs in 21 World Series games. He also had success hitting off pitcher Ken Forsch. While never hitting more than two home runs off any other pitcher, he managed to hit 5 against Forsch in his career.

With the Dodgers, whenever knuckleballer Charlie Hough pitched, Yeager would use a special enlarged catcher's mitt and would hold it in a cupped style, palm facing upward, instead of the normal upright "target" position.

=== Throat protector ===
In 1976, Yeager was injured when teammate Bill Russell's bat shattered as he hit a ground ball and a large, jagged piece from the heavy end of the bat slammed into the throat of Yeager, who was in the on-deck circle. The wood hit him in the neck and pierced his esophagus, necessitating surgery. After the incident, at Yeager's urging Dodger trainer Bill Buhler invented and patented a device that hangs from the catcher's mask to protect the throat. It was soon worn by most catchers throughout the Majors and other leagues.

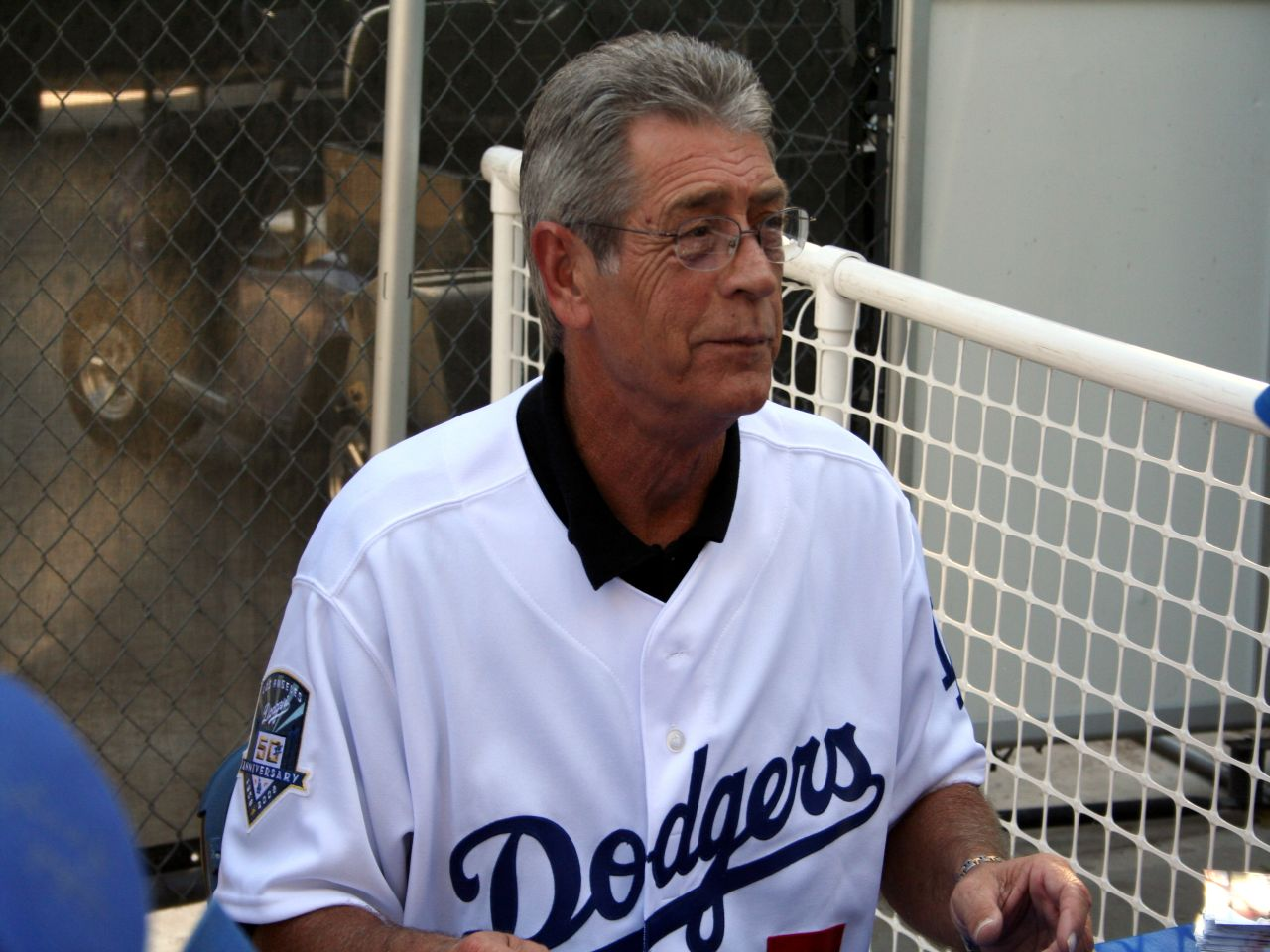
Steve Yeager signing autographs before the 2008 NLCS Game 3

=== Coaching career ===
Steve Yeager coached the Dodgers catchers from 2012–2018.

== Minor league coaching career ==
In 1999, Yeager was the hitting coach for the Dodgers' Single-A San Bernardino Stampede, which won the California League championship. He managed the Long Beach Breakers in the independent (now-defunct) Western Baseball League in 2001. The team won the league championship in their inaugural season that year, beating the Chico Heat 3 games to 2. He was the Jacksonville Suns hitting coach in 2004, when the team won the championship, and in 2005-06 he was the hitting instructor/coach for the Dodgers AAA farm club, the Las Vegas 51s. He later joined the A Dodgers affiliate Inland Empire 66'ers and became the hitting coach in 2007.

Yeager was instrumental in the conversion of Russell Martin from third base to behind the plate.

In 2007, he became the manager for the Long Beach Armada of the independent Golden Baseball League.

== Personal life ==
In September 1979, he and his family appeared on an episode of Family Feud. They played for a total of 6 days.

In 1982, Yeager posed semi-nude in Playgirl magazine.

In 1991, Yeager filed for Chapter 7 bankruptcy.

In July 1996, Yeager was sued by the New York City Department of Consumer Affairs in the United States District Court for the Southern District of New York for allegedly misleading dozens of investors into donating between $2,900 and $3,500 into a fraudulent sports card brokering business. He was sued for the same scheme in November of that year in Illinois and in 1997 in California.

By 1997, Yeager had been divorced three times.

Yeager served as a technical advisor and also played a small role as Coach Duke Temple, in Major League, Major League II, and Major League: Back to the Minors.

In 2008, Yeager sued two filmmaking companies for nonpayment of $50,000 allegedly promised to him to serve as a technical advisor on the film Playing with the Enemy: A Baseball Prodigy, a World at War and a Field of Broken Dreams. Yeager allegedly had been hired to teach the film's lead actor to play baseball like a convincing professional ballplayer.

Yeager is a co-owner of a Jersey Mike's Subs franchise.
