= Bo Durkac =

American baseball player and coach (born 1972)

Current position
- Title: Infield & hitting coach
- Team: South Florida
- Conference: American

Biographical details
- Born: December 12, 1972 (age 53); Kittanning, Pennsylvania, U.S.

Playing career
- 1992: North Carolina
- 1993–1995: Virginia Tech
- 1995: Will County Claws
- 1995: Adirondack Lumberjacks
- 1996: Visalia Oaks
- 1997: High Desert Mavericks
- 1998–2000: Chico Heat
- 2001: Long Island Ducks
- 2001: Sonoma County Crushers
- Position: Third baseman

Coaching career (HC unless noted)
- 2003–2009: Charlotte (IF/H)
- 2010–2014: Illinois State (IF/H)
- 2015–2018: Illinois State
- 2019: Miami (FL) (IF/H)
- 2020–present: South Florida (IF/H)

Head coaching record
- Overall: 82–134
- Tournaments: MVC: 3–8; NCAA: 0–0

Gabriel Bo Durkac (born December 12, 1972) is an American college baseball coach and former third baseman. He is the hitting and infield coach at the University of South Florida. Durkac played college baseball at the University of North Carolina at Chapel Hill in 1992 and Virginia Tech from 1993 to 1995 and Arizona State University before pursuing a professional career. He served as the head baseball coach at Illinois State University from 2015 to 2018.

== Playing career ==
Durkac began his college career at the University of North Carolina at Chapel Hill, where he hit .226 as a freshman. After being told he would not have much of an opportunity to play much as a sophomore, he transferred to Virginia Tech. While he was at Virginia Tech, he was twice named an All-Metro Conference honoree.

== Coaching career ==
On June 10, 2002, Durkac was hired as an assistant at the University of North Carolina at Charlotte.

In 2009, he was hired by Illinois State as an assistant coach working primarily with hitters and infielders. On June 23, 2014, Durkac was promoted to head baseball coach. He was fired on May 29, 2018, after compiling a 82–134 record.

On July 26, 2018, Durkac was named the volunteer assistant at the University of Miami, working with infielders and hitters. He was then named the infielder and hitting coach at the University of South Florida, as well as recruiting coordinator on July 16, 2019.

== Head coaching record ==
Record table
Season	Team	Overall	Conference	Standing	Postseason
Illinois State Redbirds (Missouri Valley Conference) (2015–2018)
2015	Illinois State	27–27	9–12	5th	Missouri Valley Tournament
2016	Illinois State	17–37	7–13	T-8th	Missouri Valley Tournament
2017	Illinois State	16–40	2–18	8th	Missouri Valley Tournament
2018	Illinois State	22–30	9–12	6th	Missouri Valley Tournament
Illinois State:		82–134	27–55		
Total:		82–134			
National champion Postseason invitational champion Conference regular season champion Conference regular season and conference tournament champion Division regular season champion Division regular season and conference tournament champion Conference tournament champion
