= Tri-City Posse =

Minor league baseball from 1995 to 2000

- 1995–2000; Tri-Cities of Washington

Minor league affiliations
- Class: Independent
- League: Western Baseball League (1995–2000)

Minor league titles
- League titles: 1999

Team data
- Ballpark: Posse Stadium (1995–2000)

The Tri-City Posse was an American minor league baseball team located in the Tri-Cities of Washington. The team was a founding member of the independent Western Baseball League, and was not affiliated with any Major League Baseball team. Posse Stadium (since renamed Gesa Stadium) in west Pasco was built to host the team.

== Overview ==
The Posse had a mix of good and bad seasons. They made it to the championship series in their first two seasons, losing best-of-five series to the Long Beach Barracudas in 1995 and 1996. After finishing last in their division in 1997 and 1998, the Posse finally won a championship by defeating the Chico Heat in a best-of-five series in 1999.

The Posse disbanded ahead of the 2001 season. The Pasco City Council signed a 10-year agreement for the Portland Rockies (one of the Colorado Rockies' minor league affiliate of the Colorado Rockies) to take over the Posse's stadium. This team, renamed as the Tri-City Dust Devils, continues to play in the Tri-Cities as of 2025.
