= Tri-City Dust Devils =

- Founded in 2001; Pasco, Washington

Team logo	Cap insignia

Minor league affiliations
- Class: High-A (2021–present)
- Previous classes: Class A Short Season (2001–2020)
- League: Northwest League (2001–present)

Major league affiliations
- Team: Los Angeles Angels (2021–present)
- Previous teams: San Diego Padres (2015–2020); Colorado Rockies (2001–2014)

Minor league titles
- Division titles (5): 2007; 2009; 2011; 2015; 2019

Team data
- Colors: Navy blue, gold, white
- Mascot: Dusty
- Ballpark: Gesa Stadium (2001–present)
- Owner/ Operator: Diamond Baseball Holdings
- General manager: Derrel Ebert
- Manager: Dann Bilardello
- Website: milb.com/tri-city-dust-devils

The Tri-City Dust Devils are a Minor League Baseball team based in Pasco, Washington. The Dust Devils are members of the Northwest League and are the High-A affiliate of the Los Angeles Angels. Tri-City plays their home games at Gesa Stadium, which opened in 1995 and has a seating capacity of 3,654.

== History ==
In 1999 a group called Portland Family Entertainment claimed the Portland territory for AAA franchise. The Portland Rockies had been playing in the Rose City since 1995. Portland Family Entertainment, who had purchased the Albuquerque Dukes franchise would be relocating to Portland for the 2000 season. On July 10 long time owner Jack Cain, who had owned the Rockies franchise dating back to the Bend Phillies, sold the franchise to Portland Family Entertainment. Forced to vacate Portland with arrival of the AAA club, the franchise moved up the Columbia River to the Tri-Cities area.

Upon relocating to the Tri-Cities, the team adopted a new unique nickname, Dust Devils. Vice President and general manager Derrel Ebert remarked, “We’re pretty big in the agricultural industries around here. With all the farms and all the dirt, we also have a high amount of wind that comes through. We literally get dirt devils, dust devils, those types of mini-tornado type things that come barreling through here at times.”

In their inaugural season the Dust Devils compiled a record of 39-36 to finish second in the north division standings. Despite a losing record, Tri-City won their first division title in 2007. The Dust Devils faced Salem-Keizer in the championship series, but fell to the Volcanoes in four games.

In 2015 the Dust Devils ended their long standing affiliation with the Colorado Rockies. Tri-City signed a player development contract with the San Diego Padres.

Due to the COVID-19 pandemic, the Minor League Baseball season was cancelled. In the winter of 2020 as part the reorganization of minor league baseball, Tri-City received an invitation to play as High-A affiliate of Los Angeles Angels. In a further change, they were organized into the High-A West along with five other teams previously of the Northwest League. In 2022, the High-A West became known as the Northwest League, the name historically used by the regional circuit prior to the 2021 reorganization.

The Dust Devils' front office is headed up by president Brent Miles and vice president / general manager Derrel Ebert. Prior to Ebert taking over as VP/GM in September 2009, Monica Ortega held the position from 2008 to 2009 as the only female general manager in the Northwest League. The principal owner of the team is hall of famer George Brett, with Miles as a minority owner.

== Before the Dust Devils ==
The Tri-Cities in southeastern Washington, which include Kennewick and Richland along with Pasco, have fielded a number of teams in the Northwest League and its predecessor, the Western International League. The Tri-City Braves were a member of the WIL from 1950 to 1955, when the team became a charter member of the new Northwest League. The Tri-Cities were continually represented through 1974 under various names (Braves 1955–60, 1962; Angels 1961, 1963–64; Atoms 1965–68; A's 1969; Padres 1970–72; Triplets 1973; Ports 1974).

In 1974, the Ports were an independent team and went 27–57 (.321) and drew just 21,611 in home attendance for the season. The team was managed by owner Carl W. Thompson, Sr. before folding.

From 1950 through 1974, home games were held at Sanders-Jacobs Field in Kennewick, located at the northeast corner of Clearwater Avenue and Neel Street (46.213°N 119.169°W). The field was aligned to the northeast and named for Harry Sanders, a Connell farmer, and Tom Jacobs, a former manager and the general manager of the Atoms at the time of his death at age 64 in 1968. The ballpark was demolished in the mid-1970s, shortly after the Ports folded.

The Tri-Cities were without baseball until 1983 when the Tri-Cities Triplets (an homage to the 1973 name) formed, though they only lasted until 1986. The Triplets had relocated from Walla Walla and were an affiliate of the Texas Rangers for the first two years, independent for the final two. They played their home games at Richland High School baseball field, adjacent to the Bomber Bowl football stadium. The team was bought by the Brett brothers in February 1986, then sold that autumn to Diamond Sports, a group headed by the general manager, Mal Fichman. The Triplets relocated to Southwestern Idaho for the 1987 season and became the Boise Hawks.

The Tri-Cities was also home to the Tri-City Posse of the independent Western Baseball League from 1995 to 2000. The Posse were founded in the WBL's first year in 1995, won the league title in 1999, but folded after the 2000 season.

== Identity ==
The Dust Devils, who had continued their relationship with the Colorado Rockies, originally intended to keep purple as their team color. However, when the Dust Devils took the field they donned navy and khaki. The colors were derived from the local topography. "If you drive through the Tri-Cities there three main things you’ll notice, it’s in the desert, so the sky is huge, it’s big sky country, and that’s obviously blue; the Columbia River is the main geographic feature, and that’s a deep, dark blue; and the hills are kind of a brown, khaki color."

== Ballpark ==
The Dust Devils play their home games at Gesa Stadium, which opened in 1995 as Tri-City Stadium. Upon the arrival of the Dust Devils in 2001 the stadium was changed from its original name to Dust Devil Stadium. The stadium has a seating capacity of 3,654.

== Season-by-season record ==
Season	PDC	Division	Finish	Wins	Losses	Win%	Postseason	Manager	Attendance
Tri-City Dust Devils
2001	COL	North	2nd	39	36	.520		Stu Cole	55,613
2002	COL	East	2nd	40	36	.526		Ron Gideon	69,824
2003	COL	East	3rd	33	43	.434		Ron Gideon	58,976
2004	COL	East	3rd	50	36	.526		Ron Gideon	54,087
2005	COL	East	2nd	36	40	.474		Ron Gideon	63,173
2006	COL	East	2nd	38	38	.500		Danny Cox	67,545
2007	COL	East	1st	37	39	.487	Lost to Salem-Keizer in championship series 3-1	Fred Ocasio	75,308
2008	COL	East	3rd	36	40	.474		Fred Ocasio	82,021
2009	COL	East	1st	47	29	.618	Lost to Salem-Keizer in championship series 3-1	Fred Ocasio	84,198
2010	COL	East	4th	30	46	.395		Fred Ocasio	84,921
2011	COL	East	1st	44	32	.579	Defeated Boise in division finals 2-0; Lost to Vancouver in championship series 2-1	Fred Ocasio	85,953
2012	COL	East	3rd	32	44	.421		Fred Ocasio	86,095
2013	COL	North	4th	34	42	.447		Fred Ocasio	83,987
2014	COL	North	3rd	33	43	.434		Drew Saylor	85,679
2015	SDP	North	2nd	42	34	.553	Defeated Everett in division finals 2-1; Lost to Hillsboro in championship series 2-1	Robbie Wine	100,613
2016	SDP	North	2nd	34	42	.447		Ben Fritz	86,886
2017	SDP	North	2nd	40	36	.526		Ben Fritz	86,461
2018	SDP	North	4th	35	41	.461		Mike McCoy	86,283
2019	SDP	North	2nd	38	38	.500	Defeated Spokane in division finals 2-1; Lost to Hillsboro in championship series 3-2	Mike McCoy	87,021
2020	Season cancelled (COVID-19 pandemic)								
2021	LAA	N/A	6th	43	68	.387		Andy Schatzley	61,245
2022	LAA	N/A	6th	58	71	.450		Jack Howell	108,136
2023	LAA	N/A	5th	58	72	.446		Jack Howell	120,444
2024	LAA	N/A	6th	53	78	.405		Willie Romero	121,949
2025	LAA	N/A	3rd	61	70	.466		Dann Bilardello	116,725

Division winner	League champions

== Roster ==
Tri-City Dust Devils roster
Players	Coaches/Other
Pitchers: 18 Tyler Bremner; 16 Luke Cooper; 29 Max Gieg; 27 Nick Jones; 3 Keythel Key; 25 Lucas Knowles; 55 Alex Martinez; 46 Peyton Olejnik; 24 Dylan Phillips; 22 Zachary Redner; 20 Kyle Roche; 14 Luke Schafer; 21 Chase Shores; 37 Francis Texido; 26 Benny Thompson; 32 Sam Tookoian; 30 Yeferson Vargas; Catchers: 5 Kevin Bruggeman; 12 Peter Burns; 13 Juan Flores; Infielders: 49 Matt Coutney; 31 Johan Macias; 6 David Mershon; 15 Jake Munroe; 4 Capri Ortiz; 2 Adrian Placencia; Outfielders: 19 Randy De Jesus; 51 Aaron Graeber; 9 Gage Harrelson; 7 Jorge Ruiz	Manager: 11 Dann Bilardello; Coaches: 35 Ty Hawkins (hitting); 33 Glendon Rusch (pitching); 50 Brian Rupp (coach); 60-day injured list: -- Rio Foster (full season); -- Bridger Holmes; 7-day injured list; * On Los Angeles Angels 40-man roster; ~ Development list; # Rehab assignment; ∞ Reserve list; ‡ Restricted list; § Suspended list; † Temporarily inactive list; Roster updated June 10, 2026; Transactions; → More rosters: MiLB • Northwest League; → Los Angeles Angels minor league players

== Notable alumni ==
- Andy Ashby (1986) 2 x MLB All-Star
- Clint Barmes (2000)
- Charlie Blackmon (2008, 2012) 3 x MLB All-Star; 2017 NL Batting Title
- Shawn Chacon (1996) MLB All-Star
- Aaron Cook (1998) MLB All-Star
- Craig Counsell (1992)
- Gary Disarcina (1988) MLB All-Star
- Damion Easley (1989) MLB All-Star
- Jim Edmonds (1988) 4 x MLB All-Star
- Chone Figgins (1998) MLB All-Star
- Ty France (2015) MLB All-Star
- Jeff Francis (2002)
- Julio Franco (1979) 3 x MLB All-Star; 1991 AL Batting Title
- Jason Grimsley (1985)
- Brad Hawpe (2000) MLB All-Star
- Chris James (1982)
- Jason Jennings (1999) 2002 NL Rookie of the Year
- Mike Maddux (1982)
- Quinton McCracken (1992)
- Neifi Pérez (1993)
- Juan Pierre (1998)
- Tim Salmon (1989) 1993 AL Rookie of the Year
- Juan Samuel (1980) 3 x MLB All-Star
- Rick Schu (1981)
- Trevor Story (2014) MLB All-Star
- Pedro Strop (2004–2005)
- Fernando Tatis Jr. (2016)
- John Thomson (2000)
- Jake Westbrook (1996) MLB All-Star
- Russell Wilson (2010) NFL Quarterback

== Former players ==
Tri-City Dust Devils players (2001–present)

Preceded by Portland Rockies	Northwest League franchise 2001–present	Succeeded by
