= Greg Bicknell =

American baseball player (born 1969)

Greg Brent Bicknell (born June 10, 1969, in Fresno, California) is an American former professional baseball player who played in the minor leagues with farm teams in the Toronto Blue Jays and Seattle Mariners organizations before becoming a regular on the independent baseball circuit with teams the California League, Texas–Louisiana League, Western Baseball League, Northern League and Golden Baseball League.

== Career ==
=== Minor League Baseball (1987–1993) ===
Pitcher Greg Bicknell has pitched professionally for 18 years after being a late draft selection. He was drafted by the Philadelphia Phillies in the 46th round of the 1987 amateur draft but went on to junior college. Two years later, was selected by the Toronto Blue Jays in the 39th round of the 1989 amateur draft. He went 6–5 with a 4.19 ERA for the St. Catharines Blue Jays that year. In 1990, he was 5–4 with a 3.65 ERA as a starter and reliever with the Myrtle Beach Blue Jays. Returning to Myrtle Beach, he was 3–5 with a save and a 4.43 ERA in 1991, being used primarily in relief. He was taken by the Seattle Mariners in the minor league section of the 1991 Rule 5 draft. In 1992, while pitching with the Peninsula Pilots, he pitched 8 innings of a combined no-hitter and threw two complete game shutouts. He tied three other pitchers for the Carolina League lead in shutouts, was four strikeouts behind league leader John Cummings (140 in 179 IP for Greg) and was seventh in the circuit in ERA. At age 23/24, he was 6–6 with a save and 4.31 ERA in 12 starts and 12 relief appearances for the Jacksonville Suns, reaching AA, the highest level he would ever get to in Organized Baseball. He walked only 28 in 94 innings that year.

=== 1994: A wild year ===
1994 was an eventful season for Bicknell. He was released by the Mariners out of spring training and signed with the independent San Bernardino Spirit of the California League. He won his only game for San Bernardino before being picked up by the Milwaukee Brewers. He pitched two scoreless innings for the Stockton Ports. In his last crack at AA, he went 2–4 with 2 saves and a 6.17 ERA in 18 games for the El Paso Diablos, with a WHIP over 2. He was then released by the Brewers and signed with the independent High Desert Mavericks of the California League, his third team in the league that year after San Bernardino and Stockton. In 9 starts for High Desert, he was smacked around badly to the tune of a 1–6, 8.61 line, allowing 79 hits in 46 innings and surrendering 13 home runs. He had a record of 34–35 in the minors to that point.

=== Texas–Louisiana League (1995–1998) ===
Thankfully for Bicknell, positions were opening up at this time for players who washed out of Organized Baseball with the formation of the independent leagues. He played the 1995 season with the Amarillo Dillas of the Texas–Louisiana League, going 10–6 with a 3.74 ERA. Greg was signed by the Toronto Blue Jays after the season, then released at the end of spring training in 1996, and returned to the Dillas. He split 1996 between Amarillo (4-6, 6.26) and the Lubbock Crickets (5-1, 4 Sv, 2.23) for a 9–7, 4.93 season. He threw 7 complete games with the Crickets in 1997, a year in which he went 9–9 with a 4.81 and was 10th in the TLL in ERA.

In 1998, he returned to the Dillas and led the league in starts and shutouts and was third in innings pitched (153), strikeouts (116), and wins. He had a 13–3, 4.53 record and was 8th in ERA. He made the league All-Star team.

=== Western Baseball League (1999–2001) ===
Greg moved to the Western League for the next three seasons. He pitched with the Reno Chukars (4-5, 1 Sv, 6.19) in 1999, the Feather River Fury in 2000 (9-6, 3.71, 8th in the WL in ERA), and the Chico Heat in 2001. In 2001, he paced the circuit in wins (11), innings pitched (140.0) and strikeouts (121). He only lost 3 and he also saved two games. He walked only 27 batters, less than one every five innings. He made the WL All-Star team and was named the league pitcher of the year. In the season finale, though, he lost to the Long Beach Breakers.

=== Taiwan (2002–2003) ===
Bicknell spent the next two seasons in the Taiwan Major League (2002) and the Chinese Professional Baseball League (2003). In 2002, Greg had a 6–11 record with one save and a 3.27 ERA for the Chianan Luka, walking an uncharacteristic 68 in 176 innings. In 2003, Bicknell was a horrendous 0–8 with a 5.05 ERA for First Financial Holdings Agan, walking 43 in 76 innings of work. Agan was 20-71-9 that year.

=== Kansas City T-Bones (2004–2007) ===
He returned to the States in 2004 with the Kansas City T-Bones of the Northern League and led the league in wins (13) and complete games (5); he lost only 3 and his 3.56 ERA ranked ninth in the circuit. Returning to his usual level of control, he walked just 22 in 134 innings.

In 2005, while with the T-Bones, he set the modern Northern League season record with 16 wins against five losses. His 2.96 ERA was 7th in the Northern League. In 2006, however, Bicknell set the League's single season loss record with 13. He won 7, led the league with 164 2/3 innings and only gave up 33 walks.

He was slated to be a player/coach with Kansas City in 2007, but was picked up by the St. Joe Blacksnakes of the American Association.

=== Chico Outlaws (2007–2008) & Winnipeg Goldeyes (2007) ===
Greg pitched one season for the Chico Outlaws of the Golden Baseball League. In 2007, he appeared in only 3 games and compiled a 2–1 with a 4.50 ERA before heading to the Winnipeg Goldeyes of the Northern League, where he made 5 appearances and had a record of 0–3 with a 4.91 ERA. In 17 appearances for the Outlaws in 2008, he had a 5–4 record with a 5.31 ERA.

His career record through 2008 was 141–103.

== Personal ==
Bicknell lives in Durham, California, with his wife Tina and daughter Rylee.
