= Pacific Suns =

- 1995–1998; (1995–1996, 1998); Oxnard, CA

Minor league affiliations
- League: Western Baseball League

Team data
- Previous names: Pacific Suns (1998); Palm Springs Suns (1995–1996)
- Previous parks: Oxnard College Park (1998); Suns Stadium (1995–1996)

The Pacific Suns, previously known as the Palm Springs Suns, were a minor league baseball team located in Oxnard, California. The team played in the independent Western Baseball League, and was not affiliated with any Major League Baseball team.

The Suns team owner/vice president was Al Campanis, former Brooklyn Dodgers player and team agent in the Los Angeles Dodgers. Co-owners are Don Di Carlo and Paul Schere. Coaching staff are major league veterans Bill Sudakis, Steve Yeager, Lee Lacy and John Verhoeven.

The Suns were founded in 1995 in Palm Springs, California. They played for two years and took one year off before moving to Oxnard for the 1998 season. The team disbanded operations in 1999.

The Suns' alumni includes pitcher Ariel Prieto, joined the Oakland Athletics, another pitcher Reynaldo Brito signed by the Atlanta Braves in 1996, and Darryl Strawberry, famous all-star of the New York Yankees and part-time Palm Springs resident, had cameos on the home plate along with Kraig Constantino (San Diego Padres).
