= Matt Luke (baseball) =

American baseball player (born 1971)

- Outfielder / First baseman
- Born: February 26, 1971 (age 55); Long Beach, California, U.S.
- Batted: Left Threw: Left

MLB debut
- April 3, 1996, for the New York Yankees

Last MLB appearance
- September 30, 1999, for the Anaheim Angels

MLB statistics
- Batting average: .242
- Home runs: 15
- Runs batted in: 40
- Stats at Baseball Reference

Teams
- New York Yankees (1996); Los Angeles Dodgers (1998); Cleveland Indians (1998); Los Angeles Dodgers (1998); Anaheim Angels (1999)

Matthew Clifford Luke (born February 26, 1971) is an American former outfielder and first baseman in Major League Baseball (MLB). He played for the New York Yankees, Los Angeles Dodgers, Cleveland Indians, and Anaheim Angels between 1996 and 1999.

== Career ==
=== Amateur ===
A native of Long Beach, California, Luke attended El Dorado High School in Placentia, California, and the University of California, Berkeley, where he played college baseball for the California Golden Bears. In 1991, he played collegiate summer baseball with the Hyannis Mets of the Cape Cod Baseball League.

=== Professional ===
The New York Yankees in the 8th round of the 1992 Major League Baseball draft.

After five years playing in the minor leagues for the Yankees organization, Luke made his MLB debut in 1996 and played for the Yankees for one game before returning to the minors, playing there through 1997. He also played for the Los Angeles Dodgers, Cleveland Indians, and Anaheim Angels. Luke played what would be his final major league game on September 30, 1999, with the Angels. He finished his Major League career with a career .242 batting average, 15 home runs, and 40 runs batted in. After the 1999 season, he signed with the Milwaukee Brewers but did not play during the 2000 season. In 2001, Luke played for the Long Beach Breakers of the Western Baseball League. In 2002, he played for the Durham Bulls, then AAA affiliates of the Tampa Bay Devil Rays and the Piratas de Campeche of the Mexican League.

== Personal ==
Luke resides in Orange County, California. He is a member of Yorba Linda Friends Church and the Fellowship of Christian Athletes. As of 2011, Luke owns his own real estate company, Matt Luke Home Team, where he also works as a real estate broker/agent. He also is a member of the Los Angeles Dodgers organization serving as a speaker and representative of the Dodgers Legend Bureau and Community Relations team.
