= Long Beach Coast =

Independent baseball team in California, U.S.

- Founded in 2026; Long Beach, California

Minor league affiliations
- Class: Independent
- League: Pioneer League

Team data
- Name: Long Beach Coast; Long Beach Regulators
- Colors: Foam green, black, cream
- Ballpark: Blair Field
- President: Ena Patel
- Manager: Troy Percival
- Website: longbeachcoast.com

The Long Beach Coast, also known as the Long Beach Regulators, are an independent baseball team competing in the Pioneer League. They are located in Long Beach, California, and play their home games at Blair Field.

== History ==
In July 2025, the Long Beach City Council voted unanimously to approve the creation of a professional baseball team in Long Beach as a member of the Pioneer Baseball League, an independent Partner League of Major League Baseball (MLB). The effort to bring baseball to the city was motivated by the recent success of the Oakland Ballers in northern California. Long Beach has hosted a number of minor league and independent baseball teams, with the most recent being the Long Beach Armada, a member of the Golden Baseball League which disbanded in 2012. Later in 2025, rapper Warren G joined the team's ownership group, and former MLB pitcher Troy Percival was named manager of the team's inaugural season.

In order to drive local participation, owners of Long Beach Baseball Club held a fan vote in October 2025 to determine the team's official identity. Residents could vote in-person or online for one of six names suggested by fans. The choices were narrowed down to three names after the first round of voting—Coast, Parrots, or Regulators—with a second round held to determine the winner. In January 2026, Long Beach mayor Rex Richardson announced that the team would officially be known as the Long Beach Coast, although the name Regulators would be used alternatively "through select in-ballpark experiences, special activations, creative storytelling and limited merchandise drops.”

The Long Beach Coast debuted in the 2026 season of the Pioneer League on May 19, defeating the Yuba-Sutter Freebirds 10–6 at Bryant Field. Their first home game was played at Blair Field on June 2 to a sold-out crowd of 3,108 attendees, resulting in a 13–4 victory over the RedPocket Mobiles.

Long Beach clinched its first playoff berth on July 7, 2026 with a 7-6 win at home over Yuba-Sutter before tying the league record for first half wins at 37 with an 8-2 road victory over the Modesto Roadsters on July 12, 2026 to clinch the First Half Pennant.

== Roster ==
Long Beach Coast roster
Active (25-man) roster	Coaching staff
Pitchers: 32 Nick Bautista; 6 Jaxon Byrd; 29 Jake Dixon; 23 Ryan Faulks; 19 Gary Grosjean; 33 Nathan Hemmerling; 22 Jonathan Kozasky; 20 Jack Martin; 5 Matthew O'Brien; 50 Steven Ordorica; 30 Cole Percival; 24 Garrett Van Deventer; 26 Zach Voelker; 31 Brett Wozniak; Catchers: 8 Thomas McCaffrey; 3 Johnny Pappas; 17 David Whittle; Infielders: 9 Cuba Bess; 18 Easton Jones; 2 Anthony Mata; 21 Patrick Roche Jr.; 12 Benjamin Rosengard; 10 Tyler Young; Outfielders: 35 Matthew Bardowell; 11 Emilio Corona; 27 Jacob Jablonski; 7 Eddy Pelc; 4 Robert Pitts; 28 Cooper Vest	Manager: -- Troy Percival; Coaches: -- AJ Crapo; -- Troy Glaus; -- Jerome Williams; Disabled list; ‡ Inactive list; § Suspended list; updated July 29, 2026 Transactions
