= Fran Rish Stadium =

Track stadium in Richland, Washington

Coordinates: 46.276°N 119.286°W

- Interactive map of Fran Rish Stadium
- Former names: Bomber Bowl; Richland Bowl
- Location: 1350 Lee Boulevard; Richland, Washington
- Owner: Richland School District # 400
- Capacity: 9,000
- Surface: Artificial turf

Construction
- Opened: 1945, 81 years ago
- Renovated: 1986, 2015, 2022

Tenants
- Richland Bombers; Hanford Falcons

Richland (the United States)
Richland (Washington (state))

Fran Rish Stadium is a football/track stadium in the northwest United States, located adjacent to the campus of Richland High School in Richland, Washington.

Long known as the "Bomber Bowl", it is the home field for the football teams of the city's two high schools, the Richland Bombers and the Hanford Falcons, although the Falcons have a separate track facility at their high school. Neither school uses the stadium for soccer matches (Bomber Field, Richland High's soccer field, is located near Carmichael Middle School, which is located across the street from Fran Rish stadium, on Thayer Drive, but the school's grounds carry down the back of the school all the way to Wellsian Way. Hanford's soccer team plays on their school grounds). But, on May 14, 2021 the girls “Richland Hanford” combined school Lacrosse team, established at the beginning of the 2020 pandemic, played the first non-football/track game at the stadium. Followed shortly by both Richland and Hanford boys Lacrosse.

In 1982, the stadium was named after longtime RHS football and baseball coach Fran Rish (1919–2006). The field is surrounded by a ten-lane running track and has a conventional north-south alignment, at an elevation of approximately 370 feet (110 m) above sea level.

The stadium was renovated in 1980, following a voter-approved bond issue; the main grandstand and press box was moved to the east sideline, and the west sideline became the visiting bleachers. The original announcer's booth became a spotter's nest, for both home and visiting teams. The stadium completed another renovation in 2015; the old bleachers and spotter's nest from 1954 on the west sideline were replaced. One aspect caused controversy – the demolition of the 'R' and 'H' letters that flanked the old bleachers in early 2014. The large concrete letters returned in August 2015.

The RHS baseball field, adjacent to the northeast, hosted minor league baseball for four summers (1983–86) as the home field of the Tri-Cities Triplets of the Class A-Short Season Northwest League. The team was sold, moved to Idaho, and became the Boise Hawks in 1987. The current NWL team for the area, the Tri-City Dust Devils, arrived in 2001 from Portland and play in Pasco at Gesa Stadium.
