= Bobby Bonds Jr. =

American baseball player (born 1970)

- Outfielder
- Born: March 7, 1970 (age 56); Palo Alto, California, U.S.
- Bats: Right Throws: Right
- Stats at Baseball Reference

Bobby Lee Bonds Jr. (born March 7, 1970) is an American former professional baseball outfielder. He is the son of former baseball player Bobby Bonds and the younger brother of Barry Bonds and Ricky Bonds. After high school, he went to Cañada College to play baseball, and was drafted in the 1992 MLB draft.

== Baseball career ==
Bonds moved up from Rookie League to Low–A during his first year in professional baseball. In 1993, he moved up to Single–A to play with the Waterloo Diamonds. In 1994, during one of the best seasons of his career, Bonds was promoted from Single–A straight to Triple–A. He began the 1995 season in High–A and was traded to the San Francisco Giants organization, the club that Barry Bonds was on at the time. In 1998, Bobby started with the independent Sonoma County Crushers, then played for the Giants' Double–A and Triple–A teams. Bonds spent the rest of his baseball career (1999–2002) with independent minor league teams.

== On his brother's steroid case ==
In a 2007, interview with the Star-Ledger, Bonds said that he doesn't know whether Barry used steroids and he said that Barry would never have admitted using them to him anyway. Bonds also criticized Hank Aaron, who had announced that he would not be present when Barry hit numbers 755 and 756.
