= Carl Nichols (baseball) =

American baseball player (born 1962)

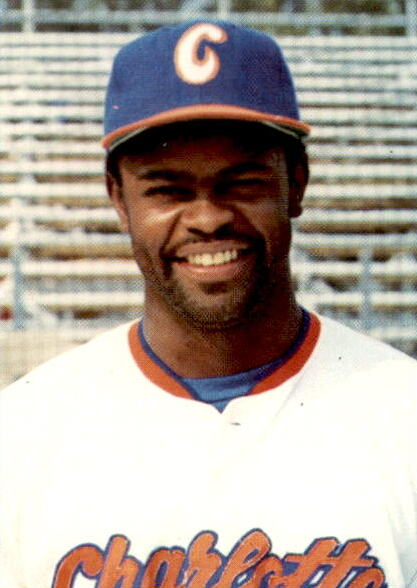
- Nichols with the Charlotte O's c. 1986
- Catcher
- Born: October 14, 1962 (age 63); Los Angeles, California, U.S.
- Batted: Right Threw: Right

MLB debut
- September 14, 1986, for the Baltimore Orioles

Last MLB appearance
- July 5, 1991, for the Houston Astros

MLB statistics
- Batting average: .204
- Home runs: 0
- Runs batted in: 18
- Stats at Baseball Reference

Teams
- Baltimore Orioles (1986–1988); Houston Astros (1989–1991)

Carl Edward Nichols (born October 14, 1962) is an American former Major League Baseball (MLB) catcher. He played parts of six seasons in the major leagues, from 1986 until 1991, for the Baltimore Orioles and Houston Astros, appearing in a total of 96 games while batting .204 with 18 RBIs.

Nichols was drafted by the Baltimore Orioles in the fourth round of the 1980 MLB draft. He played in the minor leagues from 1980 through 1991, both before and after his MLB appearances. Nichols later played in the independent Northern League (1993–1995) and Western Baseball League (1996–1997).

Within MLB, Nichols appeared in a total of 36 games for the Orioles, during the 1986 through 1988 seasons, and a total of 60 games for the Houston Astros, during the 1989 through 1991 seasons. He appeared in 69 games as a catcher, four games as an outfielder, and three games as a first baseman.

Following his playing career, Nichols has been active in coaching, including six years with the MLB Urban Youth Academy.

Nichols is the uncle of former MLB player Ray Lankford.
