= Ben Fritz =

American baseball player & coach

Arizona Diamondbacks
- Pitching coach
- Born: March 29, 1981 (age 45); San Jose, California, U.S.
- Bats: Right Throws: Right
- Stats at Baseball Reference

Teams
- As coach: San Diego Padres (2020–2026); Arizona Diamondbacks (2027-present)

Benjamin James Fritz (born March 29, 1981) is an American professional baseball coach and former pitcher. He is the pitching coach for the Arizona Diamondbacks of Major League Baseball (MLB).

== Playing career ==
Fritz attended Oak Grove High School in San Jose, California, and California State University, Fresno, where he played college baseball for the Fresno State Bulldogs. The Oakland Athletics selected Fritz in the first round, with the 30th overall selection, of the 2002 MLB draft.

Fritz played minor league baseball in the Oakland organization from 2002 through 2007. He underwent Tommy John surgery in 2004. Fritz was selected by the Detroit Tigers in the minor league phase of the 2007 Rule 5 draft. After spending 2008 with Detroit, he played his final two seasons with the Lancaster Barnstormers of the independent Atlantic League.

== Coaching career ==
=== San Diego Padres ===
In 2015, Fritz joined the San Diego Padres organization as a coach for the AZL Padres. He served as the manager of the Tri-City Dust Devils in 2016 and 2017. Fritz served as rehabilitation coordinator for the Padres Arizona complex in 2018 and 2019.

Fritz was named the Padres' bullpen coach following the 2019 season. When the Padres fired Larry Rothschild as their pitching coach in August 2021, they named Fritz the new pitching coach.

=== Arizona Diamondbacks ===
On October 30, 2026, Fritz was hired to be the pitching coach for the Arizona Diamondbacks.

== See also ==
- Rule 5 draft results
