= Brent Miles =

American baseball executive

Brent Miles is the president of the Tri-City Dust Devils, a short-season single-A affiliate of the San Diego Padres of the Northwest League, the president of the Rancho Cucamonga Quakes, and the president of the High Desert Mavericks of the California League.
