= Bill Plummer =

American baseball player and manager (1947–2024)

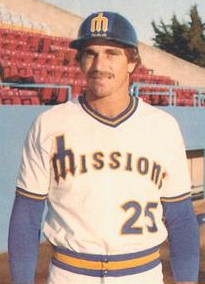
- Plummer in 1978
- Catcher
- Born: March 21, 1947; Oakland, California, U.S.
- Died: March 12, 2024 (aged 76); Redding, California, U.S.
- Batted: Right Threw: Right

MLB debut
- April 19, 1968, for the Chicago Cubs

Last MLB appearance
- September 7, 1978, for the Seattle Mariners

MLB statistics
- Batting average: .188
- Home runs: 14
- Runs batted in: 82
- Managerial record: 64–98
- Winning %: .395
- Stats at Baseball Reference

Teams
- As player: Chicago Cubs (1968); Cincinnati Reds (1970–1977); Seattle Mariners (1978); As manager: Seattle Mariners (1992); As coach: Seattle Mariners (1982–1983, 1988–1991); Colorado Rockies (1993–1994)

Career highlights and awards
- 2× World Series champion (1975, 1976)

William Francis Plummer (March 21, 1947 – March 12, 2024) was an American professional baseball player and manager. He played in Major League Baseball (MLB) as a catcher in 1968 and then from 1970 to 1978, most notably as a member of the Cincinnati Reds dynasty that won four National League pennants and two World Series championships between 1970 and 1976. He also played for the Chicago Cubs and the Seattle Mariners.

== Playing career ==
Born in Oakland, California, Plummer attended Anderson Union High School in Anderson, California. After one year at Shasta College, he was signed by the [[1965 St. Louis Cardinals] season|St. Louis Cardinals]] on April 25, 1965, as an amateur free agent, and was named a Florida Rookie League All-Star that summer. Plummer played three years in the Cardinals' minor league system. While playing for Sparky Anderson with the Modesto Reds in 1967, Phillies scout Eddie Bockman noted that Plummer was "strong, can catch everyday," has "all the desire and hustle in the world," and "recommend a Rule 5 draft on him if he is available."

The Chicago Cubs selected Plummer from the Cardinals on November 28, 1967, in the Rule 5 draft. Plummer made his MLB debut on April 19, 1968. He spent nearly all of 1968 on the bench and catching in the bullpen in Chicago due to the rules on sending Rule 5 drafted players to the minor leagues. Plummer made his major league debut with the Cubs on April 19, 1968, at the age of 21 in a 9–2 road loss to the Cardinals. Pinch-hitting for Chuck Hartenstein, he struck out against Hal Gilson. He had only one more at-bat that season and played in just two games.

The Cubs traded Plummer, Clarence Jones, and Kenneth Myette to the Reds for Ted Abernathy on January 9, 1969. He spent the season with the Triple-A Indianapolis Indians. He was in the minors again in 1970, but was called up to the pennant-winning Reds in September, long enough to play in four games with nine plate appearances, including his first career hit. While with the Indianapolis Indians, Plummer was a 1970 American Association All-Star and 1971 American Association All-League selection.

While never a regular starter—he was Johnny Bench's backup catcher during the Big Red Machine years—he did play solid defense with a .983 fielding percentage, but was a lifetime .188 hitter. His most memorable game was in 1974, when he hit two home runs in Philadelphia off Hall of Famer Steve Carlton.

Plummer also played multiple seasons of winter league baseball, with the Lobos de Arecibo in 1970-71 and 1972-73 in Puerto Rico, Águilas del Zulia in 1975-76 in Venezuela, and the Marineros de Guaymas in 1978-79 in Mexico.

Plummer's career as a backup catcher was profiled in a Sports Illustrated article in July 1977. "I've always wondered how Bill would do if he played two months straight," said Pete Rose. "He's a physical fitness nut, and if hard work means anything, he would do all right." The article's writer said of Plummer, "He is a private person. He hoards his time and spends it with his wife Robin and two daughters, Gina and Tricia. He doesn't drink, works out, jogs and plays tennis, and during the winter he labors on his father-in-law's northern California cattle ranch."

== Coaching career ==
After he retired as a player, Plummer stayed in the Mariners' system, and managed the San Jose Missions in 1980, the Wausau Timbers in 1981, the Chattanooga Lookouts in 1984 and 1985, and the Triple-A Calgary Cannons from 1986 through 1988. Plummer managed the Leones del Caracas to a Venezuelan Winter League championship in 1986–87. He also managed Caracas for the 1988–89 season.

Plummer was the Mariners' bullpen coach in 1982, 1983, 1989, and 1990, and third base coach for the second half of 1988 and 1991. When third-year manager Jim Lefebvre was fired after the 1991 season, the franchise's first with a winning record, Plummer was promoted for 1992. Seattle finished in last place in his only season as manager, with a 64–98 (.395) record, and Plummer was let go in October. The club had been sold in July, and he was succeeded in November by Lou Piniella for the 1993 season.

Plummer spent 1993 and 1994 in the Colorado Rockies organization, starting the 1993 season as the AZL Rockies pitching coach and ending the season as the major league bullpen coach in Denver. In 1995, Plummer returned to managing with the Jacksonville Suns, the Detroit Tigers' Double-A affiliate. In the spring of 1996, the International Division of Major League Baseball sent Plummer and other coaches, including Fernando Arroyo, Jim Lefebvre, and Greg Riddoch, to serve as official advisors to the upstart Taiwan Major League.

In 1996, Plummer converted Tigers third baseman Phil Nevin into a catcher in Jacksonville. The Tigers fired Plummer from Jacksonville at the All-Star break, despite winning the Southern League first-half championship, and Plummer finished the season managing the Billings Mustangs in Cincinnati's farm system.

Plummer went on to manage independent league baseball with the Western Baseball League's Chico Heat from 1997–1999, and Yuma Bullfrogs from 2000–2001. In 2002, he joined the Arizona Diamondbacks' minor-league system, eventually working his way up to their Triple-A affiliate, the Tucson Sidewinders, which he managed in 2007–2008. Plummer managed the Tigres de Aragua for the 2001–02 season. Plummer served as the minor league catching coordinator for the Diamondbacks from 2009 to 2012. He became the manager of the Naranjeros de Hermosillo of the Mexican Pacific League in 2011.

In 2013, Plummer served as manager of the Diamondbacks' Single-A affiliate Visalia Rawhide of the California League in his 22nd season as a minor league manager. Through the 2013 season, he had a career minor league managing record of 1351–1253 (.519). In 2014, Plummer reassumed the role of Arizona Diamondbacks catching coordinator. Plummer announced his retirement at the end of the 2017 season, with a career managerial record of 1583–1459 (.520). Plummer is a member of the Shasta County Sports Hall of Fame, Sacramento Area Baseball Hall of Fame, and Northern California Sports Association Hall of Fame.

From 2018 to 2023, Plummer was the hitting coach, catching coach and bench coach for the summer collegiate Redding Colt 45s.

== Managerial record ==
=== Summer record ===
Team	Years	Level	Record		
Team	Years	Level	W	L	Win %
San Jose Missions	1980	California League	73	66	.525
Wausau Timbers	1981	Midwest League	84	48	.636
Chattanooga Lookouts	1984–1985	Southern League	129	158	.449
Calgary Cannons	1986–1988	Pacific Coast League	194	180	.519
Seattle Mariners	1992	American League	64	98	.395
Jacksonville Suns	1995–1996	Southern League	114	99	.535
Billings Mustangs	1996	Pioneer League	13	24	.351
Chico Heat	1997–1999	Western Baseball League	171	98	.636
Yuma Bullfrogs	2000–2001	Western Baseball League	84	94	.472
Lancaster JetHawks	2002, 2005	California League	127	113	.529
Yakima Bears	2003–2004	Northwest League	80	72	.526
Tennessee Smokies	2006	Southern League	70	69	.504
Tucson Sidewinders	2007–2008	Pacific Coast League	135	149	.475
Visalia Rawhide	2013	California League	77	63	.550
Total			1415	1331	.515

=== Winter record ===
Team	Years	Level	Record		
Team	Years	Level	W	L	Win %
Leones del Caracas	1986–87 and 1988–89	Venezuelan Winter League	86	60	.589
Tigres de Aragua	2001–02	Venezuelan Winter League	44	38	.537
Naranjeros de Hermosillo	2011–13	Mexican Pacific League	38	30	.559
Total			168	128	.568

== Personal life ==
Plummer's father, William Lawrence Plummer, pitched in the Pacific Coast League from 1921 to 1927, and his uncle, Red Baldwin, was a catcher in the Pacific Coast League from 1915 to 1931. The elder Plummer and Baldwin were teammates in 1924 and 1925 with the Seattle Indians. Plummer's grandson, Conner Menez, has played in MLB.

Plummer, who resided in Northern California, earned his Bachelor of Arts degree from Chico State University while managing the Chico Heat in the late 1990s, decades after leaving Shasta College after one year and signing with the Cardinals in 1965.

Plummer's former player Edgar Martinez was inducted into the National Baseball Hall of Fame in 2019, and specifically mentioned Plummer in his acceptance speech as having been an important coach during his minor league career.

In October 2021, a documentary entitled Plum: A Baseball Life, about Plummer's 53-year baseball career, was released.

Plummer died on March 12, 2024, at his home in Redding, California, after a heart attack. He was 76.
