= WordWeb =

English dictionary and thesaurus software

- Original author: Antony Lewis
- Developer: WordWeb Software
- Operating system: Windows 10 and 11; macOS; iOS and iPadOS; Android
- Type: Dictionary software, thesaurus
- License: Proprietary; free and paid editions
- Website: www.wordwebsoftware.com

WordWeb is an English dictionary and thesaurus program created by Antony Lewis. It was publicly available by 1996, when it was listed for distribution in an archive associated with the Usenet group rec.puzzles.crosswords. The Windows desktop program is available in a free edition and a paid edition, WordWeb Pro; separate WordWeb applications are also available for macOS, iOS and iPadOS, and Android.

WordWeb's lexical database was originally based on WordNet, the lexical database developed at Princeton University, and has since been expanded with corrections and additional material. In addition to definitions and synonyms, it displays semantic relationships including antonyms, types, less-specific terms, similar words, and part–whole relationships.

The free Windows edition carries an environmental licensing condition: indefinite free use is limited to users who take no more than two commercial flights, including at most one return flight, in any twelve-month period.

== History ==
WordWeb originated as an add-on for Lewis's crossword-construction program Crossword Compiler before developing into a stand-alone dictionary and thesaurus, according to a 2006 review by Digital-Lifestyles. By October 1996, it was listed—along with a downloadable WordWeb data archive—in an archive index for the Usenet group rec.puzzles.crosswords. The 2006 review described the WordWeb database as based on Princeton's WordNet, with many thousands of corrections and additions made by the developers. Princeton's WordNet project likewise lists WordWeb 5 among its related projects, describing it as based on WordNet 3.0 and developed by Antony Lewis.

In a 2007 review of WordWeb 5, Digital-Lifestyles noted that the version allowed a word to be looked up using Control-right-click without first selecting it, and that it integrated online references to Wikipedia, Wiktionary, and WordWeb Online into the application. The main dictionary database remained stored locally, however, and usable without an Internet connection.

The current WordWeb Online copyright notice credits material from Princeton WordNet 3.0 and Open English WordNet, in addition to material copyrighted by Lewis and WordWeb Software.

== Dictionary and features ==
WordWeb combines dictionary definitions with a semantic thesaurus. Entries can include definitions, synonyms, antonyms, usage examples, pronunciations, and links between semantically related word senses. For example, the program can display different types of a word's referent and identify larger things of which it can form a part.

On Windows, WordWeb can look up words directly from other applications using mouse or keyboard shortcuts. The dictionary and thesaurus can be used offline, while online reference sites can be opened from within the program when a connection is available.

WordWeb supports several varieties of English. The Windows edition can be configured for British, American, Canadian, Australian, New Zealand, Irish, South African, Asian, or international English, with an option to hide or flag words associated with other locales.

=== Free and Pro editions ===
The free Windows edition provides the core dictionary and thesaurus, one-click lookup from other applications, offline access, web-reference links, and audio pronunciations for core vocabulary.

WordWeb Pro adds features including wildcard and full-text searches, anagram searching, custom glossaries and web references, and support for optional third-party dictionaries. Optional dictionaries include works from Oxford University Press, Collins, and Chambers.

=== Other platforms ===
WordWeb Software publishes separate WordWeb dictionary applications for macOS, iOS and iPadOS, and Android, which the company states have interfaces and functionality different from the Windows desktop program. The iOS and Android editions both use the WordWeb dictionary database and provide definitions, synonyms and related words, spelling suggestions, search functions, bookmarks, and offline use.

== Licensing ==
WordWeb is proprietary software. The free Windows edition may be used indefinitely only by people who take at most two commercial flights, including no more than one return flight, in any twelve-month period; a user who exceeds that limit must purchase WordWeb Pro or uninstall the free version after its 30-day trial period.

Not-for-profit educational establishments are exempt from the air-travel condition when making a network installation for use by their students. WordWeb Software states that the licensing model is intended to allow people with less ability to pay to use the software free of charge, while giving frequent flyers an incentive to reduce air travel.

The environmental condition has changed over time. In 2007, Salon reported that the then-current free license required users who drove a sport utility vehicle or took more than four flights per year to purchase the Pro edition, though registered disabled users who required an SUV were exempt from the vehicle condition. The article identified Lewis as WordWeb's creator and included his explanation of the licensing policy.

== Reception ==
A 2008 Softpedia review highlighted WordWeb's ability to perform quick lookups from other Windows applications. Similar functionality was later praised by PCWorld, which in 2013 highlighted WordWeb's rapid desktop lookup and the amount of related information it supplied for words, including synonyms and links to external references, while criticizing inaccuracies in some of the program's recorded pronunciations.
