= Long Beach Barracudas =

- 1995–1996; Long Beach, California

Minor league affiliations
- League: Western Baseball League
- Division: South Division

Minor league titles
- League titles: 1995

Team data
- Previous names: Long Beach Riptide (1996); Long Beach Barracudas (1995)

The Long Beach Barracudas were a minor league baseball team located in Long Beach, California. The team played in the independent Western Baseball League and was not affiliated with any Major League Baseball team. Their home stadiums were Long Beach State's 49er Field and Blair Field.

The Barracudas were founded in 1995, but changed name to the Long Beach Riptide in 1996. After the 1996 season the team relocated to Mission Viejo, California as the Mission Viejo Vigilantes.
