= Sonoma County Crushers =

- 1995–2002; Rohnert Park, California

Minor league affiliations
- Previous classes: Independent
- League: Western Baseball League

Minor league titles
- League titles: 1 (1998)

Team data
- Colors: Purple, Cardinal, Black, White
- Previous parks: Rohnert Park Stadium

The Sonoma County Crushers were a minor league baseball team located in Rohnert Park, California. They were a member of the independent Western Baseball League, and were not affiliated with any Major League Baseball team.

The team was one of the founding members of the league, beginning play in 1995. They won the WBL championship in 1998. The team folded with the league after the 2002 season; they were the only team to participate in all eight seasons of the WBL. At one point, former San Francisco Giants outfielder Kevin Mitchell managed the Crushers.

The team played in Rohnert Park Stadium, which was built in 1981 for the California League's now-defunct Redwood Pioneers. The stadium was demolished in 2005, three years after the Crushers' final season.

The Crushers embraced the local wine industry in multiple ways. The stadium's home run fence included a 16 foot (4.9 m) wall in left field, covered in local wine advertisements, which was called the Wine Sign or the Grape Monster (a play on Fenway Park's Green Monster). The team also sold wine bottles at the stadium, autographed by the players. The team mascot was Crusher, the Abominable Sonoman, with large purple feet for stomping grapes, in reference to the surrounding Wine Country region.

Like many independent minor league teams, the Crushers relied on a mix of young players hoping to get recognized by pro teams and older players sticking around after playing in higher leagues. Cuban defectors joined the Crushers to showcase their skills. The most notable professional baseball player to develop with the Crushers is Chad Zerbe, who pitched for the San Francisco Giants from 2000–2003, including three appearances and a win in the 2002 World Series against the Anaheim Angels.

== Season-by-season results ==
Sonoma County Crushers
Season	League	Division	Overall	Win %	Finish	Manager	Playoffs
1995	WBL	South	44–46	.489	3rd	Paul Deese	Did not qualify
1996	WBL	South	34–56	.378	4th	Dick Dietz	Did not qualify
1997	WBL	South	56–34	.622	1st	Dick Dietz	Lost in playoffs vs. Chico 1–2
1998	WBL	South	49–41	.544	2nd	Dick Dietz	Won in playoffs vs. Chico 3–0; League champions vs. Western 3–0
1999	WBL	—	41–49	.456	3rd	Dick Dietz	Did not qualify
2000	WBL	South	38–52	.422	3rd	Jeffrey Leonard	Did not qualify
2001	WBL	North	48–42	.533	3rd	Tim Ireland	Did not qualify
2002	WBL	North	49–41	.544	2nd	Kevin Mitchell	Lost in playoffs vs. Chico 1–3
Totals			359–361	.499	—	—	8–5

== Notable players ==
- José Alguacil
- Lance Blankenship
- Bobby Bonds Jr.
- Darrell Brown
- Tim Cossins
- Carlos Crawford
- Glenn Dishman
- Bo Durkac
- Curtis Goodwin
- Donald Harris
- Wayne Housie
- Hansel Izquierdo
- Kurt Knudsen
- James Lofton
- Walt McKeel
- Keith Mitchell
- Kevin Mitchell
- Andy Morales
- Eric Newman
- Kevin Pickford
- Víctor Rosario
- Makoto Sasaki
- Tim Scott
- Garry Templeton
- J. J. Thobe
- Tom Thobe
- Steve Wojciechowski
- Kerry Woodson
- Chad Zerbe
