= Blair Field =

Stadium in Long Beach, California

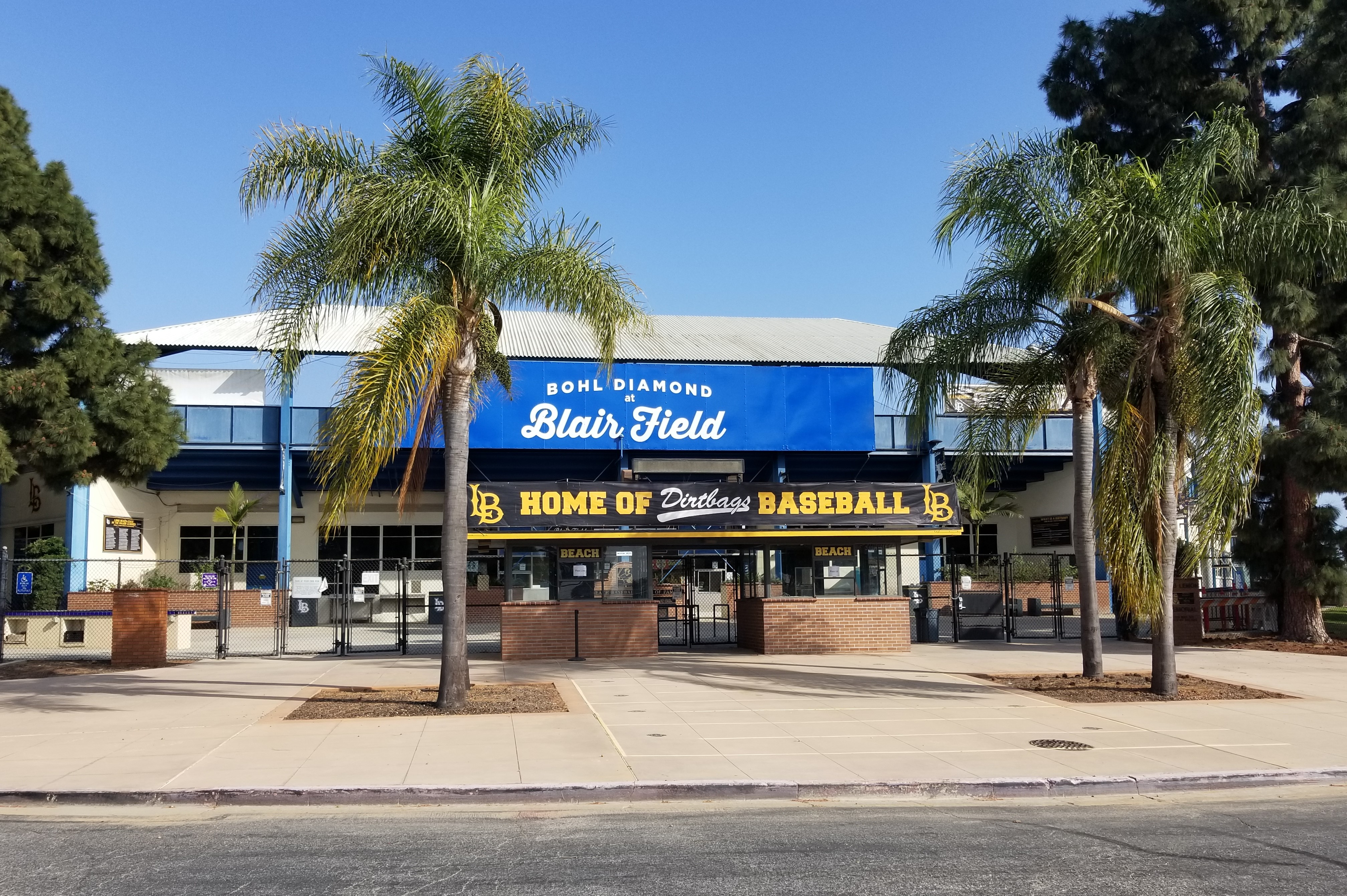
- Interactive map of Blair Field
- Location: 4700 Deukmejian Drive; Long Beach, CA 90804
- Coordinates: 33°46′40″N 118°8′18″W
- Owner: City of Long Beach
- Operator: City of Long Beach
- Capacity: 3,238
- Surface: Grass
- Field size: Left - 348 ft. Center - 400 ft. Right - 348 ft.

Construction
- Opened: April 11, 1958
- Renovated: 1992, 1999
- Cost: $500,000

Tenants
- Long Beach State Dirtbags (Big West) (1993–present); Long Beach Armada (GBL) (2005–2009); Long Beach Breakers (WBL) (2001–2002); Long Beach Riptide (WBL) (1995–1996); Chicago Cubs (NL) (1966) (spring training); Long Beach Coast (PL) (2026–present)

Blair Field is a stadium in Long Beach, California. It originally opened in 1956 and is primarily used for baseball. It holds 3,238 people. It is named for Frank Blair, the sports editor for the Long Beach Press-Telegram newspaper for 32 years.

Located in Recreation Park, it was constructed in 1958 and over the years has fostered local amateur baseball and hosted Moore League high school football and baseball teams, along with American Legion and Connie Mack baseball. The Chicago Cubs baseball team held spring training at the ballpark in 1966, the Los Angeles Rams football team and Olympic teams have used the site for practice or exhibition games.

It is the home of the Long Beach State Dirtbags baseball and the Long Beach Coast of the Pioneer League. It is the former home of the defunct Western Baseball League team, the Long Beach Breakers, and the defunct Golden Baseball League team, the Long Beach Armada.

In 1992, $1.475 million was spent to renovate the 3,238-seat facility. New spectator seating, field lights, a playing field with state-of-the-art drainage system, and turf which exceeds professional baseball standards were installed. Additional improvements, including 774 new box seats and a new scoreboard, were made in 1999.

In 2008, CSULB and the City of Long Beach built a new scoreboard with a full LCD color video screen and LED score displays.

Prior to the 2016 season, a new outfield fence was built. The new fence reduced the dimensions of the park, while providing a safer, padded barrier for outfielders. In 2017, the Troy & Danyll Tulowitzki Batting Facility as well as the Jered Weaver Bullpen were constructed.

== Attendance ==
In 2012, the Dirtbags ranked 46th among Division I baseball programs in attendance, averaging 1,391 per home game.

== Other uses ==
Blair Field has hosted six MTV Rock N' Jock softball games. It has also been the filming location for numerous film, TV, and commercial productions, including the movies Space Jam and Moneyball.

The Minnesota Vikings practiced at Blair Field prior to Super Bowl XI in nearby Pasadena.

== Gallery ==
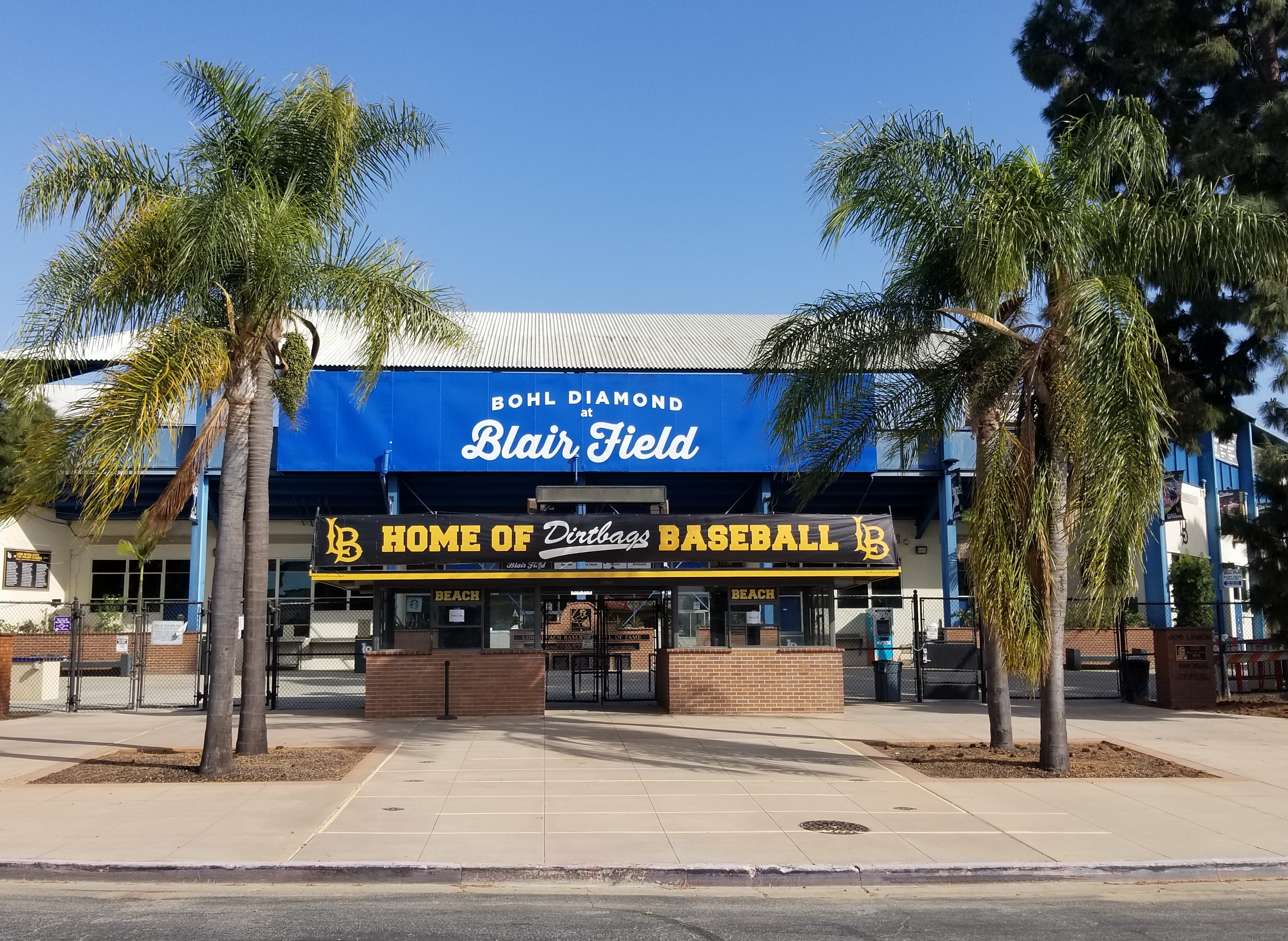
Blair Field main entrance

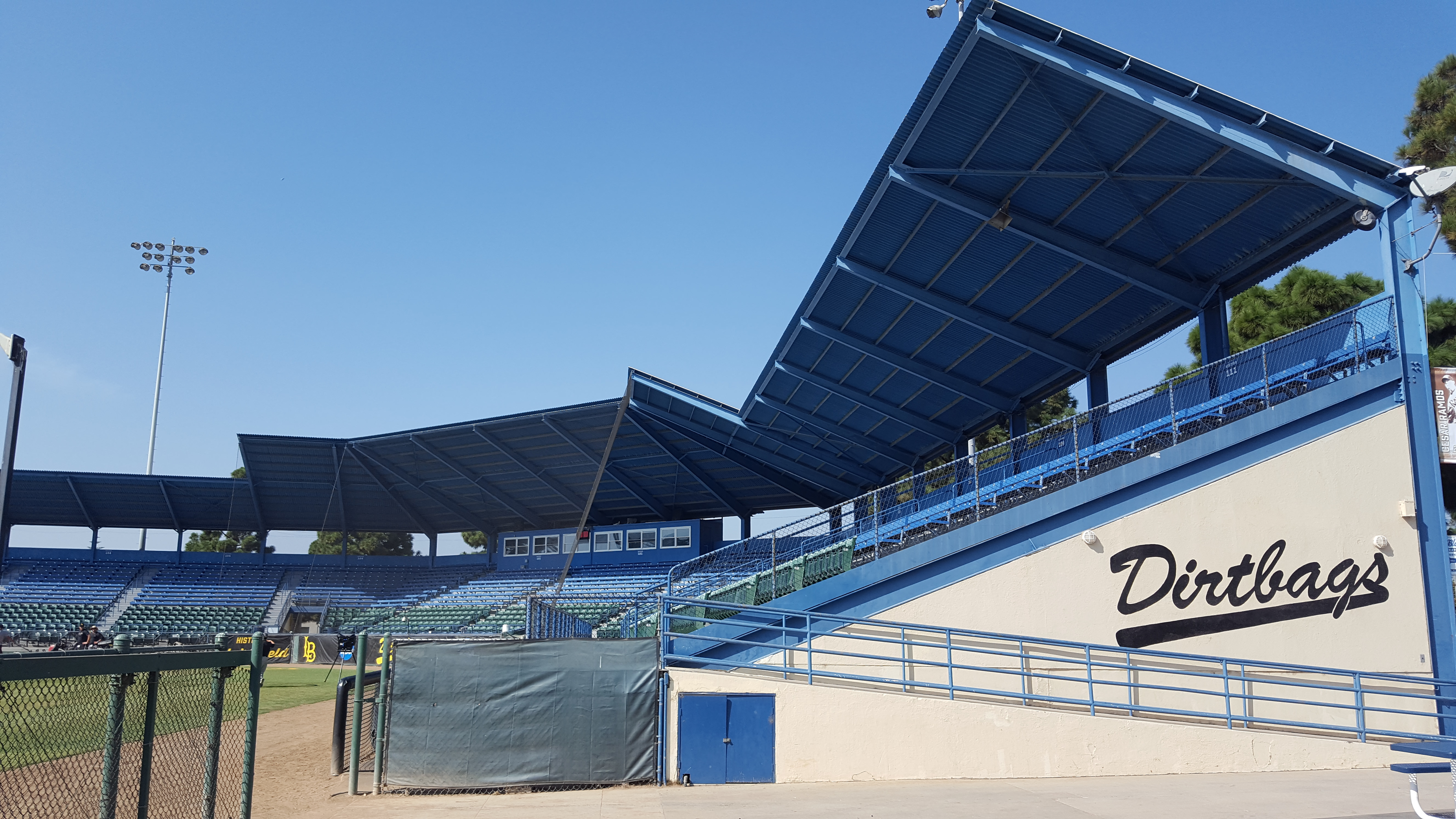
Blair Field grandstand

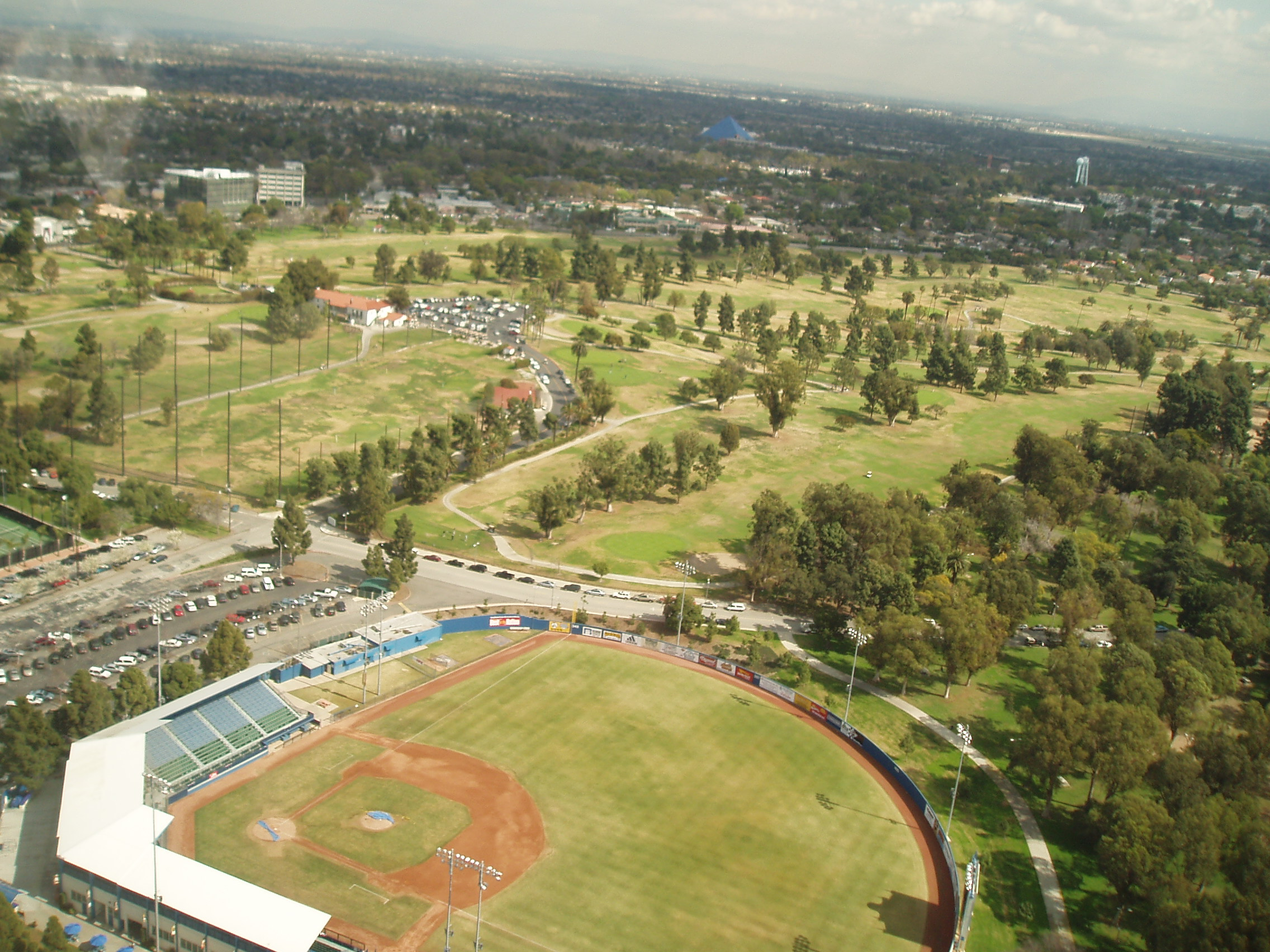
Blair Field - Recreation Park

== See also ==
- List of NCAA Division I baseball venues
