= Anthony Lewis (baseball) =

American baseball player

- Outfielder / First baseman
- Born: February 2, 1971 (age 55); Las Vegas, Nevada, U.S.
- Bats: Left Throws: Left
- Stats at Baseball Reference

Anthony Lamar Lewis (born February 2, 1971) is an American former professional baseball player who hit over 200 home runs in the minor leagues. Although he reached the Triple-A level on multiple occasions, he never played in the major leagues. In 2000, he won a Triple Crown, leading the Northern League in batting average, home runs, and runs batted in. Listed at 5 feet 11 inches (1.80 m) and 205 pounds (93 kg), he batted and threw left-handed. Defensively, he played as an outfielder and first baseman.

== Biography ==
Lewis was born in Las Vegas, Nevada, and attended Rancho High School. He was drafted by the St. Louis Cardinals in the eighth round of the 1989 Major League Baseball draft, a few picks ahead of pitcher Curtis Leskanic.

In 51 games with the Arizona League Cardinals in 1989, he slashed .246/.282/.332 with two home runs, 27 runs batted in (RBIs) and 11 stolen bases. The following year, he slashed .254/.291/.370 with eight homers, 49 RBIs and 10 stolen bases in 128 games for the Single-A Savannah Cardinals. In 1991, he hit .230/.311/.343 with six home runs and 43 RBIs for the St. Petersburg Cardinals. He was also with St. Petersburg in 1992 and hit .222/.299/.370 with 15 home runs and 55 RBIs in 128 games. With the Arkansas Travelers in 1993, he batted .264/.314/.482 with 13 home runs and 50 RBIs in 112 games and in 1994, between Arkansas and the Triple-A Louisville Redbirds, Lewis hit .230/.276/.408 with 17 home runs and 56 RBIs. In his first taste of Triple-A, he batted .122/.122/.149 in 21 games. Back with Arkansas in 1995, he batted .251/.326/.494 with 24 home runs and 85 RBIs in 115 games.

Lewis joined the Minnesota Twins organization in 1996, hitting .253/.320/.452 with 24 home runs and 95 RBIs in 134 games for the Hardware City Rock Cats. In 1997, he was in the Colorado Rockies system, hitting .228/.279/.497 with 12 home runs and 36 RBIs in 51 games. His slugging percentage of .497 was the highest in his career through 1997. He also spent time in the Mexican League in 1997, playing for the Saltillo Saraperos. Lewis spent most of 1998 with Duluth-Superior in the independent baseball ranks, while also playing briefly for the Wichita Wranglers in the Kansas City Royals system, hitting .252/.344/.439 with 12 home runs and 53 RBIs. Back with Duluth-Superior in 1999, Lewis batted .296/.354/.540 with 19 home runs and 64 RBIs in 83 games.

In 2000, Lewis had perhaps the best season in Northern League history. In 86 games for Duluth-Superior, he hit .365/.444/.777 with 33 home runs, 89 RBIs, 88 runs scored and 34 doubles—all of which he led the league in. He also led the league in OPS (1.222) and total bases (262) and tied for the lead in games played and intentional walks (12), while adding 19 stolen bases and 46 walks, the latter of which was fifth in the league. He was a league All-Star, won the Triple Crown and was named Independent League Player of the Year by Baseball America.

Lewis signed a contract with the Chicago White Sox prior to the 2001 campaign, but failed to report to camp. During 2001, his final season in professional baseball, Lewis batted .248/.297/.512 with 22 home runs and 90 RBIs in another All-Star campaign for the St. George Pioneerzz. He also played briefly for Dos Laredos Tecolotes of the Mexican League that year.

Overall, Lewis batted .255 in 1,285 minor and independent league games in his career, with 207 home runs and 795 RBIs (this total does not include statistics from his Mexican League play).
