= Antony Lewis =

Cosmologist and software developer

- Education: University of Cambridge (MSci, PhD)
- Scientific career
- Fields: Cosmology
- Workplaces: University of Sussex
- Thesis: Geometric algebra and covariant methods in physics and cosmology (2000)
- Doctoral advisor: Anthony Lasenby

Antony Martin Lewis is a cosmologist and software developer. He is Professor of Cosmology at the University of Sussex. His research focuses on the cosmic microwave background (CMB), gravitational lensing and cosmological inference.

Lewis co-developed the cosmology code CAMB with Anthony Challinor, developed CosmoMC and GetDist, and co-developed the Bayesian analysis framework Cobaya with Jesús Torrado. He participated in the cosmological analysis of data from the Planck satellite. Outside academic research, he created the Crossword Compiler puzzle-construction software and the WordWeb dictionary and thesaurus.

== Education and academic career ==
Lewis received an MSci in physics from the University of Cambridge in 1997. His doctoral research was carried out in the Astrophysics Group of the Cavendish Laboratory while he was a member of Queens' College, Cambridge. His dissertation, Geometric algebra and covariant methods in physics and cosmology, supervised by Anthony Lasenby, is dated September 2000.

In 2000 Lewis began postdoctoral research at the Department of Applied Mathematics and Theoretical Physics (DAMTP) at Cambridge. He moved to the Canadian Institute for Theoretical Astrophysics in Toronto in 2002 for three years, including four months at the Harvard–Smithsonian Center for Astrophysics. In 2005 he returned to the Institute of Astronomy, Cambridge on an Advanced Fellowship, and moved to the University of Sussex at the start of 2010.

== Research ==
Lewis's research has focused particularly on the cosmic microwave background, including CMB polarisation, gravitational lensing, statistical inference and the interpretation of cosmological observations. With Anthony Challinor and Anthony Lasenby, he developed numerical calculations of CMB anisotropies in closed cosmological models.

Lewis and Challinor developed CAMB (Code for Anisotropies in the Microwave Background), which calculates CMB, lensing, matter and other cosmological power spectra. Lewis also developed software for cosmological parameter inference. With Sarah Bridle he introduced a Markov chain Monte Carlo approach to cosmological parameter estimation associated with CosmoMC in 2002. He subsequently developed GetDist, a Python package for analysing Monte Carlo samples, and with Jesús Torrado developed Cobaya, a framework for Bayesian statistical modelling and sampling.

A substantial part of Lewis's research concerns the gravitational lensing of the CMB. With Challinor, he developed a full-sky method for calculating the effects of lensing on CMB temperature and polarisation power spectra, and the two later wrote a review of CMB weak gravitational lensing. His later lensing work has included the lensing-induced CMB bispectrum and its effects on primordial non-Gaussianity searches, post-Born corrections to CMB lensing, and iterative maximum-a-posteriori reconstruction of the lensing potential for high-sensitivity CMB observations.

Lewis participated in the analysis of data from the Planck satellite and was an author of the collaboration's final cosmological-parameter and gravitational-lensing analyses. The Gruber Foundation lists Lewis among the members of the Planck Team that received the 2018 Gruber Cosmology Prize.

In later work with Julien Carron and Mark Mirmelstein, Lewis produced a CMB lensing reconstruction from the Planck PR4 (NPIPE) maps, improving the reconstruction signal-to-noise relative to the earlier Planck release. He is also a member of the Simons Observatory collaboration.

== Crossword and dictionary software ==
Lewis wrote the first version of Crossword Compiler in 1993 while studying for his A levels, initially as a way of teaching himself computer programming. In 2025, historian of mathematics Joseph Dauben described Crossword Compiler as the first advanced program for crossword construction.

The Guardian described Crossword Compiler as the market leader in crossword-construction software in 2006. In a 2024 interview published by the University of Texas at Austin, computational linguist and crossword constructor Kyle Mahowald described it as the most widely used software for crossword construction.

Lewis also created WordWeb, an English dictionary and thesaurus application. WordWeb was in public circulation as Windows freeware by May 1996, when Lewis identified himself as its author in a Usenet announcement. In 2007, Salon independently described Lewis as WordWeb's creator. WordWeb Software currently describes Lewis as its main developer.
