= Anthony Lewis (English cricketer) =

English cricketer (1932–2026)

Personal information
- Full name: Anthony Charles Wilson Lewis
- Born: 29 September 1932; Newcastle-under-Lyme, Staffordshire, England
- Died: 22 March 2026 (aged 93)
- Batting: Right-handed

Domestic team information
- Years: Team
- 1952–1953: Cambridge University
- 1950–1953: Staffordshire

Career statistics
Competition	First-class
Matches	7
Runs scored	83
Batting average	9.22
100s/50s	–/1
Top score	55
Catches/stumpings	–/–
- Source: Cricinfo, 30 November 2011

Anthony Charles Wilson Lewis (29 September 1932 – 22 March 2026) was an English cricketer. He was a right-handed batsman.

== Biography ==
Lewis was born at Newcastle-under-Lyme, Staffordshire, and educated at Repton School. He made his debut for Staffordshire in the 1950 Minor Counties Championship against Durham. Lewis made a further appearance for the county in 1953 against Durham. While attending the University of Cambridge, Lewis made his first-class debut for Cambridge University Cricket Club against the Free Foresters in 1952. He made five further first-class appearances for the university, the last of which came against Sussex in 1953. In his six first-class matches, he scored a total of 83 runs at an average of 9.22, with a high score of 55. This score came on debut against the Free Foresters, and was the only time he passed double figures in any match.

Lewis died at home on 22 March 2026, aged 93.
