= Tri-City Atoms =

- 1950–1974; Kennewick, Washington

Minor league affiliations
- Class: Class A Short Season (1966–1974); Class A (1963–1965); Class B (1955–1962); Class A (1952–1954); Class B (1950–1951)
- League: Northwest League (1955–1974); Western International League (1950–1954)

Major league affiliations
- Team: San Diego Padres (1970–1972); Oakland Athletics (1969); Los Angeles Dodgers (1966–1968); Baltimore Orioles (1965); Los Angeles Angels (1963–1964); Baltimore Orioles (1960–1961); Pittsburgh Pirates (1958); Philadelphia Phillies (1952); St. Louis Cardinals (1951)

Minor league titles
- League titles (4): 1965; 1966; 1968; 1971

Team data
- Name: Tri-City Ports (1974); Tri-City Triplets (1973); Tri-City Padres (1970–1972); Tri-City A's (1969); Tri-City Atoms (1965–1968); Tri-City Angels (1963–1964); Tri-City Braves (1962); Tri-City Atoms (1961); Tri-City Braves (1950–1960)
- Ballpark: Sanders-Jacobs Field

The Tri-City Atoms were a minor league baseball team located in Kennewick, Washington. The Tri-Cities in southeastern Washington, which include Kennewick, Richland, and Pasco, fielded a number of minor league teams in the Northwest League and its predecessor, the Western International League, from 1950 to 1974.

== History ==
The Tri-City Braves were a member of the WIL from 1950 through 1954. In 1955 Tri-City joined the Northwest League as a charter member. The Tri-City Braves, while serving as an affiliate of various major league clubs retained the Braves name through 1960. Upon signing on with the Baltimore Orioles in 1961, the club adopted a unique name, the Atoms. The club reverted to Braves for 1962 season, which proved to be a successful year as team finished the regular season in first place. The Braves faced the Wenatchee Chiefs in the league championship, but lost the 2–4. The team changed its name to Angels for 1963, representative of its parent club.

The franchise again changed affiliates, signing on with the Baltimore Orioles resulting in a name change to Atoms. Led by manager Cal Ripken Sr., the Atoms posted an 81–58 record in the club's final season of full season baseball. The Atoms swept the Lewiston Broncs in the championship series 3–0 to claim their first Northwest League crown.

In 1966, the Northwest League shifted to a short-season format. Tri-City switched parent clubs and signed a player development contract with the Los Angeles Dodgers. The Atoms had an explosive season and finished the regular season at 57–27. The Atoms finished at the top of the league standings to be named league champion. Two seasons later, the Atoms compiled a league best record en route to a third Northwest League title. The Dodgers ended their relationship with Tri-City following the 1968 season and moved their farm system to Medford, Oregon with the Rouge Valley club. In 1969, Tri-City partnered with the Oakland Athletics, but the affiliation ended after only one season, as Oakland shifted its NWL affiliation to southwest Oregon at Coos Bay-North Bend. Tri-City then inked a player development contract with the San Diego Padres following their inaugural season as an expansion member of the National League.

In 1974, the Ports were an independent team and went 27–57 in front of 21,611 fans. The team was managed by owner Carl W. Thompson, Sr. before folding.

The Tri-Cities were without baseball until 1983, when the Tri-Cities Triplets relocated from Walla Walla, and were affiliated with the Texas Rangers for two seasons. When that relationship ended, the Triplets spent two seasons as an independent (1985, 1986), then relocated to southwestern Idaho and became the Boise Hawks.

Professional baseball returned to the Tri-Cities in 2001 with relocation of the Portland Rockies, who were forced to move as the territory was awarded to a AAA level franchise. Originally the team planned to keep the Rockies name. Ultimately the club selected a unique moniker, the Dust Devils.

== Ballpark ==
Tri-City teams played home games at Sanders-Jacobs Field in Kennewick, The ballpark was opened in 1950 with a seating capacity of 5,000 and a northeast alignment. The field dimensions were 340 feet from home plate down both the right and left field lines and 400 feet to dead center. Originally the stadium was named Sanders Field for Harry Sanders, a Connell farmer. It was later named Sanders-Jacobs Field to honor Tom Jacobs, a former manager and the general manager of the Atoms. The stadium was demolished in 1975.

== Notable players ==
Notable players with the Atoms included Doyle Alexander, Ron Cey, Joe Ferguson, and Ted Sizemore, the National League's Rookie of the Year in 1969.

== Season-by-season record ==
Season	PDC	Division	Finish	Wins	Losses	Win%	Postseason	Manager	Attendance
Tri-City Braves
1955			6th	66	63	.512		Don Pries	49,296
1956			6th	59	72	.450		Don Pries	78,761
1957			6th	57	79	.419		Don Pries	54,761
1958	PIT		5th	62	73	.459		Ray Hathaway	45,283
1959			6th	60	80	.429		Daniel Holden	46,751
1960	BAL		2nd	81	60	.574		Chester McDowell	80,063
Tri-City Atoms
1961	BAL		6th	49	90	.353		Chester McDowell	37,817
Tri-City Braves
1962	LAA		1st	78	62	.557	Lost to Wenatchee Chiefs in championship series 2-4	Tommy Heath	68,399
Tri-City Angels
1963	LAA		4th	65	75	.464		Tommy Heath	60,123
1964	LAA		5th	66	74	.471		Tommy Heath	51,220
Tri-City Atoms
1965	BAL		1st	81	58	.583	Defeated Lewiston in championship series 3-0	Cal Ripken	42,856
Tri-City Atoms
1966	LAD		1st	57	27	.679	NWL Champions by virtue of record	Duke Snider	29,402
1967	LAD		3rd	37	47	.440		Don LeJohn	22,421
1968	LAD		1st	45	30	.600	NWL Champions by virtue of record	Don LeJohn	19,356
Tri-City A's
1969	OAK		2nd	41	38	.519		Billy Herman	30,320
Tri-City Padres
1970	SDP	North	4th	38	42	.475		Cliff Ditto	30,320
1971	SDP	North	1st	50	30	.625	NWL Champions by virtue of record	Cliff Ditto	32,648
1972	SDP	South	2nd	38	42	.475		Cliff Ditto	36,919
Tri-City Triplets
1973		South	2nd	42	38	.525		Mike Cloutier	20,791
Tri-City Ports
1974		East	4th	27	57	.321		Carl Thompson	21,611

Division winner	League champions

== Former players ==
- Tri-City Padres players (1970–1972)
- Tri-City A's players (1969)
- Tri-City Atoms players (1961, 1965–1968)
- Tri-City Angels players (1963–1964)
- Tri-City Braves players (1950–1960, 1962)
