= M. Anthony Lewis =

M. Anthony Lewis is an American robotics researcher and currently serves as the Vice President of Hewlett-Packard and the head of Hewlett-Packard's Compute Lab for disruptive edge technologies. Formerly, he served as the Head of was the former Senior Director of Technology at Qualcomm Technologies and was the creator of Zeroth neural processing unit and its software API. He is past CEO of Iguana Robotics, a company specializing in the development of biomorphic robotics technologies.

Lewis received his Ph.D. at the University of Southern California under the guidance of Michael Arbib and George Bekey. He has served on the faculty of the University of California, Los Angeles and the University of Illinois and is currently on the faculty of the University of Arizona.

He is known for his work in evolutionary and biomorphic robotics, formation control of robotic systems, and investigations into the basis of movement control in humans and robots. He collaborated on a project to help paralyzed people, using studies of an eel's nerve circuitry.

In recent work, Lewis and colleagues have demonstrated a robot that claimed to be the most biologically accurate model of human locomotion to date. This robotic uses a muscle architecture much like a human being, a simplified neural circuit meant to mimic neurons in the spinal cord, and sensory feedback mimicking the primary sensory pathways found in human.
