= Long Beach Breakers =

- 2001–2002; Long Beach, California

Minor league affiliations
- League: Western Baseball League

Team data
- Previous parks: Blair Field

The Long Beach Breakers were an independent league baseball team that played at Blair Field in Long Beach, California. They played in the independent Western Baseball League from 2001–2002 and were not associated with any Major League Baseball team.

The Breakers were founded in 2001 and owned by Jerry Schoenfeld, a California businessman. They won a league championship in their 2001 inaugural season. They played for two seasons and were coached by Los Angeles Dodgers catcher Steve Yeager. The staff of coaches consisted of bench and hitting coach Joe Magno, former associate scout for the Cincinnati Reds and college baseball coach, along with pitching coaches John Curtis of the California Angels and George Throop of the Kansas City Royals. Players included Matt Luke, Marc Gutfeld and pitcher Ritchie Linares. The team was folded along with the league after the 2002 season. It was replaced in 2005 by the Golden Baseball League's Long Beach Armada.

== Notable alumni ==
- Steve Yeager, Manager - former player for the Los Angeles Dodgers
- John Curtis, First Base Coach - former Boston Red Sox pitcher
