= Western Warriors (baseball) =

Minor league baseball team

The Western Warriors were a minor league baseball team playing in the independent Western Baseball League, and not affiliated with any Major League Baseball team.

The team began when the Grays Harbor Gulls ceased operations midway through the 1998 season. The league assumed control of the team, renaming them the Western Warriors. The Warriors went on a 68-game road trip, not having a home stadium to play in.
