= Chico Heat =

- 1997–2018; (1997–2002, 2016–2018); Chico, California

Minor league affiliations
- Previous classes: Independent (1997–2002); Collegiate summer baseball (2016–2018)
- League: Western Baseball League (1997–2002); Great West League (2016–2018)

Minor league titles
- League titles: 4 (WBL: 1997, 2002; GWL: 2016, 2018)
- Division titles: 3 (WBL: 1997, 2002; GWL: 2018)

Team data
- Previous names: Chico Heat (1997–2002, 2016–2018)
- Colors: Navy Blue, Red, White
- Previous parks: Nettleton Stadium (1997–2002, 2016–2018)
- Owner(s)/ Operator(s): Chico Heat Professional Baseball Club, LLC (Steve & Kathy Nettleton, 1997–2002); Chico Heat Baseball, LLC (Steve & Kathy Nettleton, Pat Gillick, Consolidated Sports Holdings, LLC, 2016–2018); Chico Heat Baseball Club (The Estate of Steve Nettleton, current)
- President: Bob Linschied (1997–1999); Jeff Kragel (2000–2002)
- General manager: Brian Ceccon (2000–2002); Hunter Hampton (2016–2018)
- Manager: Bill Plummer (1997–1999); Charlie Kerfeld (2000–2002); Fred Ludwig (2016–2018)
- Media: Chico Enterprise-Record

The Chico Heat is the name of two baseball teams that have operated in Chico, California. The first was a professional independent team operating in the Western Baseball League from 1997 to 2002, and the second team was an independent team operating as part of the summer collegiate wood bat league known as the Great West League, which began operations in 2014 and ceased operations in 2018. The team's title sponsor was Golden Valley Bank. Both teams were majority owned by Steve and Kathy Nettleton.

== History ==
=== The original Chico Heat (1997–2002) ===
The team started as a professional independent baseball team operating in Chico, California, in the Western Baseball League. They had no operating agreement with any Major League Baseball team. They were founded on July 29, 1996, by Chico Heat Professional Baseball LLC, with former supermarket entrepreneur Steve Nettleton and his wife Kathy serving as principal owners. General managers included Bob Linscheid (who would go on to become president of the WBL) and Jeff Kragel (now at Chico State University) and their mascot was the "Heater The Dragon" (not to be confused with the Bakersfield Blaze or Dayton Dragons mascots of the same name). The team began operations in 1997. The team immediately won the league championship in their inaugural season and, although they did not win a championship in the four subsequent years, they won the most regular season games in each of the following seasons. They appeared in the championship series in five out of their six seasons in the league. In 2002, Chico won its second league championship in the league's and the team's final season. After leaving the financially troubled league and after efforts to join Minor League Baseball's Class A-Advanced California League by trying to lure the Visalia Oaks to Chico failed, the Heat ceased operations effective immediately.

The team played at Nettleton Stadium, which is located on the campus of California State University, Chico. They were preceded by the Oroville/Chico Red Sox of the minor league's Class-C Far West League from 1948 to 1949 and were succeeded by the Chico Outlaws of the independent Golden Baseball League, taking their place in 2005. The Heat has been the most successful professional baseball franchise in the city's history.

On August 11, 2007, former Heat majority owner Steve Nettleton and former Heat players were honored as part of a celebration called "Remember The Heat Night" hosted by the Chico Outlaws as they faced the St. George RoadRunners. The original Heat mascot "Heater" even made an appearance. The Outlaws won the ball game in front of over 3,500 fans at Nettleton Stadium.

=== The Chico Heat of the GWL (2014–2018) ===
On November 25, 2014, the franchise announced its return to the field in the summer of 2016, but this time as a member of the summer collegiate wood bat league known as the Great West League. Steve Nettleton will return as a principal owner along with former Major League Baseball executive and Chico native Pat Gillick. The Heat's beloved mascot "Heater The Dragon" returned to the team after a 20-year absence. They began play on the road in a loss to the rival Marysville Gold Sox. The Heat defeated the Medford Rogues 2 games to 1 to capture the inaugural GWL Championship. It is the second time in franchise history that they won a championship in their first season.

On July 24, the Heat hosted the second annual GWL All-Star Game. This year, the entire Heat team faced the best of the Great West League, a departure from the normal format. The home run derby will also take place the same day. The Heat faced the Rogues for the second straight season in the GWL Championship, this time falling to their rivals 2 games to 0. In 2018, the Heat would return to the GWL Championship, this time against the Lincoln Potters. They downed the Potters 2 games to 0 to win their second and final championship.

On October 4, 2018, the Heat GWL team announced that they were suspending operations as a result of the Great West League itself suspending operations.

=== Year-by-year record ===
==== Western Baseball League ====
Year	League	Affiliation	Record	Finish	Manager	Playoffs
1997	Western Baseball League	none	45–45	2nd South Division	Bill Plummer	defeated Reno 3–1 in championship
1998	Western Baseball League	none	63–26	1st South Division	Bill Plummer	lost to Sonoma County 0–3 in semifinals
1999	Western Baseball League	none	63–27	1st overall	Bill Plummer	lost to Tri-City 0–3 in championship
2000	Western Baseball League	none	57–33	1st North Division	Charlie Kerfeld	lost to Zion in championship
2001	Western Baseball League	none	56–34	1st North Division	Charlie Kerfeld	lost to Long Beach in championship
2002	Western Baseball League	none	55–35	1st North Division	Charlie Kerfeld	defeated Long Beach in championship

==== Great West League ====
Year	League	Affiliation	Record	Finish	Manager	Playoffs
2016	Great West League	none	34–23	2nd	Fred Ludwig	defeated Medford 2–1 in championship series
2017	Great West League	none	38–22	2nd	Fred Ludwig	lost to Medford 2–0 in championship series
2018	Great West League	none	43-14	1st	Fred Ludwig	defeated Lincoln Potters 2–0 in championship series

== Broadcasting ==
The original Chico Heat were broadcast on KPAY NewsTalk 1290 AM throughout their entire run with longtime area broadcaster Rory Miller on the call. The current Heat welcomed Miller back to the air waves on The Edge 101.7 FM sharing broadcast duties with KPAY's Mike Baca, with broadcast engineers Mike Vislosky and Ryan Mouser.

== The death of Steve Nettleton ==
On January 11, 2019, Heat founder and majority owner Steve Nettleton died at age 79 following a long battle with Parkinson's Disease.
