= St. George Pioneerzz =

The St. George Pioneerzz were a Minor League Baseball team located in St. George, Utah. The team played in the independent Western Baseball League, and was not affiliated with any Major League Baseball team. Their home stadium was Bruce Hurst Field.

The Pioneerzz were founded in 1999 as the Zion Pioneerzz and won the 2000 Western Baseball League championship. They were renamed the St. George Pioneerzz for the 2001 season, after which they ceased operations. The team had lost $2 million during its three years of operation.
