= Western Baseball League =

Former American independent baseball league

- Western Baseball League logo
- Sport: Baseball
- Founded: 1994
- Founder: Bruce L. Engel
- Folded: 2002
- Motto: "Baseball the way it was meant to be"
- Country: United States
- Last champion: Chico Heat

The Western Baseball League was an independent baseball league based in the Western United States and Western Canada. Its member teams were not associated with any Major League Baseball teams. It operated from 1995 to 2002.

The league was founded in 1994 by Portland, Oregon businessman Bruce L. Engel. He had promoted an independent league with a team in Portland since at least 1989. He had also tried to buy the Seattle Mariners in 1987.

The league began play in 1995, with the following teams:

Northern Division:

- Bend Bandits
- Grays Harbor Gulls
- Surrey Glaciers
- Tri-City Posse

Southern Division:

- Long Beach Barracuda
- Palm Springs Suns
- Salinas Peppers
- Sonoma County Crushers

Long Beach won the inaugural league championship, defeating Tri-City, 3 games to 1. However, the team had to drop its "Barracuda" nickname, re-named "The Franchise" after the team's former president stripped the team of its name.

In 1996, Surrey folded, then the Reno Chukars were added. Long Beach, re-named the Riptide, won its second consecutive title, again 3 games to 1 over Tri-City.

In 1997, the league added the Chico Heat, while Palm Springs took the year off and Long Beach became the Mission Viejo Vigilantes. Chico won the league championship in its first season in the league, defeating Reno, 3–2.

In 1998, Salinas disbanded, while dormant Palm Springs moved to Oxnard, California and became the Pacific Suns. Grays Harbor suspended operations halfway through the season, and the league took over management of the team, which continued as the Western Warriors and went on an extended 68-game road trip with no home stadium. Despite the lack of a home stadium, the Warriors made it to the league championship series before being swept by Sonoma County, 3–0.

In 1999, the league disbanded the Western Warriors, while Mission Viejo, Bend, and Pacific also folded. The Sacramento Steelheads and Zion Pioneerzz were added, making the WBL a six-team league. Tri-City won the league championship for the year, 3 games to 1 over Chico.

For the 2000 season, Reno called it quits after four years in the league, while Sacramento moved to Vacaville, California and became the Solano Steelheads. The WBL was back at eight teams, however, as the Yuma (AZ) Bullfrogs, Feather River (Marysville, CA) Mudcats and Valley (Scottsdale, AZ) Vipers were added. The Zion Pioneerzz won the league championship, defeating Chico 3 games to 1.

For the 2001 season, Valley and Feather River folded, while league stalwart Tri-City defected to the Northwest League. The league returned to a market it previously served, adding the Long Beach Breakers to bring the loop back to six teams. The Zion Pioneerzz were renamed the St. George Pioneerzz. The expansion Breakers won the league championship, defeating Chico 3 games to 2.

In its final year of 2002, the Western Baseball League again operated with six teams. St. George folded, while Marysville, Calif., re-entered the league to take the Pioneerzz' place, playing the season as the Yuba-Sutter Gold Sox. The Chico Heat won the league championship in the league's final season, defeating Long Beach 3 games to 1.

After the league folded, the western United States were without independent baseball until 2005, when former WBL cities Chico, Long Beach, and Yuma were awarded franchises in the upstart Golden Baseball League. Three of the 8 current GBL cities are former Western League markets, as Reno was added to the circuit in 2006, while St. George became a member of the league in 2007.

On September 9, 2014, it was reported that former WBL team, the Grays Harbor Gulls, would be reborn as a member of the new Mount Rainier Professional Baseball League in 2015 and would play their home games at Olympic Stadium once again. It is also mentioned that the "new" Gulls will have no ties to the original team. The Gulls and the MRPBL folded halfway through the inaugural season in 2015 due to financial problems.

== Championship Series ==
Season	Winner	Loser	Result
1995	Long Beach Riptide	Tri-City Posse	3–1
1996	Long Beach Riptide	Tri-City Posse	3–1
1997	Chico Heat	Reno Chukars	3–1
1998	Sonoma County Crushers	Western Warriors	3–0
1999	Tri-City Posse	Chico Heat	3–1
2000	Zion Pioneerzz	Chico Heat	3–1
2001	Long Beach Breakers	Chico Heat	3–2
2002	Chico Heat	Long Beach Breakers	3–1

== Western Baseball League Awards ==
Season	Player of the Year	Pitcher of the Year	Manager of the Year
1995	Kyle Washington, Sonoma County	John Weglarz, Tri-City	Dave Holt, Salinas
1996	Rick Prieto, Salinas	Paul Anderson, Long Beach	Butch Hughes, Reno
1997	Todd Takayoshi, Reno	Mike Smith, Mission Viejo	Dick Dietz, Sonoma County
1998	Todd Pridy, Salinas	Mike Smith, Mission Viejo	Charlie Kerfeld, Western
1999	Justin Drizos, Reno	Ryan Bowen, Sacramento	Bill Plummer, Chico
2000	Robert Muro, Zion	Jason Olsen, Feather River	N/A
2001	Vic Sanchez, Solano	Greg Bicknell, Chico	Charlie Kerfeld, Chico
2002	Vic Sanchez, Solano	Jeff Harris, Chico	Charlie Kerfeld, Chico
