= 2025 Pecos League season =

15th season of the Pecos League

- League: Pecos League
- Sport: Baseball
- Duration: May 22 – July 29 (Playoffs: July 29 – August 11)
- Games: 54
- Teams: 16

Mountain Division
- League champions: Tucson Saguaros

Pacific Division
- League champions: San Rafael Pacifics

Pecos League Championship
- Champions: Tucson Saguaros
- Runners-up: San Rafael Pacifics

Seasons
- ← 2024 2026 →

The 2025 Pecos League season is the 15th season of professional baseball in the Pecos League, an independent baseball league which operates in cities in desert mountain regions throughout California, New Mexico, Arizona, Colorado, Kansas, Oklahoma, and Texas, since its creation in August 2010. There are 16 Pecos League teams, split between the Mountain and Pacific divisions.

The Alpine Cowboys entered the season as the defending champions, having defeated the San Rafael Pacifics, two games to none, in the league's 2024 championship series.

Andrew Dunn will return as commissioner for the 2025 season.

The season concluded with the Tucson Saguaros defeating the San Rafael Pacifics two games to one to capture their fourth title in franchise history.

== Regular season standings ==
Mountain Division South Regular Season Standings
Pos	Team	G	W	L	T	Pct.	GB
1	y – Tucson Saguaros	53	43	9	1	.821	--
2	x – Alpine Cowboys	51	28	22	1	.559	14.0
3	x – Pecos Bills	50	25	35	0	.500	17.0
4	e – Sante Fe Fuego	50	16	34	0	.320	26.0
5	e – Roswell Invaders	51	9	42	0	.176	33.5

Mountain Division North Regular Season Standings
Pos	Team	G	W	L	Pct.	GB
1	y – Garden City Wind	51	44	7	.863	--
2	x – North Platte 80s	48	27	21	.563	15.5
3	x – Blackwell FlyCatchers	46	23	23	.500	18.5
4	e – Trinidad Triggers	52	21	31	.404	23.5
5	e – Kansas City Hormigas	46	12	34	.261	29.5

Pacific Division Regular Season Standings
Pos	Team	G	W	L	T	Pct.	GB
1	y – San Rafael Pacifics	54	38	16	0	.704	--
2	x – Bakersfield Train Robbers	54	35	19	0	.648	3.0
3	x – Dublin Leprechauns	54	33	20	1	.620	4.5
4	x – Martinez Sturgeon	54	25	29	0	.463	13.0
5	e – Vallejo Seaweed	54	17	37	0	.315	21.0
6	e – Monterey Amberjacks	54	13	40	1	.250	24.5

- y – Clinched division
- x – Clinched playoff spot
- e – Eliminated from playoff contention

== Statistical leaders ==
Stat	Player	Team	Total
HR	Jesus Chavez	San Rafael Pacifics	21
AVG	Andrew Curran	Martinez Sturgeon	.443
RBIs	Jason Rooks	Garden City Wind	88
SB	Anthony Manisero	Tucson Saguaros	45

=== Pitching ===
Stat	Player	Team	Total
W	Jared Greer; Cutter Smith	San Rafael Pacifics; Garden City Wind	8
ERA	Chris Allen	San Rafael Pacifics	1.80
SO	Art Joven	Bakersfield Train Robbers	76
SV	Brad Moreno	Dublin Leprechauns	6

To qualify as league leader for hitter, AVG - Minimum of plate appearances of 2.7 per team game. To qualify as league leader for pitcher, ERA - Minimum inning(s) of .8 pitched per team game.

== Awards ==
=== All Star games ===
Series tied, .

Game	Date	Score	Location	Time	Attendance
1	July 13	Mountain South – 7, Mountain North – 3	Clint Lightner Field	2:37	N/A
2	July 16	Pacific West – 5, Pacific East – 4	Albert Park	1:48	N/A

== Playoffs ==
=== Format ===
1. Ten teams will qualify for the playoffs

2. The team with the best record in each division will qualify as the division winner and be the number 1 seed. (Mountain and Pacific)

3. The Mountain Division will have its top 6 teams qualify for the playoffs. While the Pacific Division will have its top 4 teams qualify.

4. Playoff Location will be determined by ballpark availability, the proximity of travel, and standings. Both teams will host a playoff game when possible in the first round.

5. The (1) and (2) seed in the Mountain division will earn byes into the second round.

=== Playoff bracket ===
First Round (best-of-three)
North Platte	20	4	X
Blackwell	10	3	X
Alpine	2	12	X
Pecos	8	16	X
N/A	X	X	X
N/A	X	X	X
N/A	X	X	X
N/A	X	X	X

Second Round (best-of-three)
1	Garden City	17	2	X
North Platte	1	1	X
Mountain
2	Tucson	13	4	X
Pecos	11	3	X
1	San Rafael	8	5	X
4	Martinez	3	2	X
Pacific
2	Bakersfield	6	7	9
3	Dublin	17	4	15

Division Championship Series (best-of-three)
1	Garden City	5	5	X
2	Tucson	11	9	X
1	San Rafael	9	9	X
3	Dublin	0	3	X

Pecos League Championship Series (best-of-three)
M2	Tucson	9	16	11
P1	San Rafael	12	13	7
