= 2022 Pecos League season =

12th annual season of the Pecos League

- League: Pecos League
- Sport: Baseball
- Duration: May 26 – August 1 (Playoffs: August 2 – August 15)
- Number of games: 50 (400 games in total)
- Number of teams: 16

Mountain Division
- League champions: Roswell Invaders

Pacific Division
- League champions: Tucson Saguaros

Pecos League Championship
- Champions: Roswell Invaders
- Runners-up: Tucson Saguaros

Seasons
- ← 2021 2023 →

The 2022 Pecos League season was the 12th season of professional baseball in the Pecos League, an independent baseball league which operates in cities in desert mountain regions throughout California, New Mexico, Arizona, Colorado, Kansas and Texas, since its creation in August 2010. There are 16 Pecos League teams, split evenly between Mountain and Pacific divisions.

The Tucson Saguaros entered the season as the defending champions, having defeated the Roswell Invaders, two games to one, in the league's 2021 championship series.

Andrew Dunn returned as commissioner for the 2022 season.

== Season schedule ==
The 16 teams in the league are split evenly between two divisions, Mountain and Pacific.

For the 2022 season, the league announced three expansion franchises: the Santa Rosa Scuba Divers, Austin Weirdos, and Weimar Hormigas. After competing in 2021, Salina was not included as a member club in 2022.

The season was played with a 50-game schedule with opening day in the Pacific Division on May 26, and opening day in the Mountain Division on June 1. The Regular season in both divisions concluded on July 31.

The Pecos League remains split into Mountain Division and Pacific Division. The Mountain and Pacific Divisions teams are aligned in four-team North and South Divisions. The biggest offseason alignment move is two-time defending Pecos League Champion Tucson Saguaros' move from the Mountain Division to the Pacific Division.

The top team in each four-team division and two teams that are non-division winners will qualify for the Playoffs. The Playoffs will consist of three rounds, ending with the Champion of the Mountain Division facing the winner of the Pacific Division.

== Regular season standings ==
=== Mountain Division ===
Mountain North Division Regular Season Standings
Pos	Team	G	W	L	Pct.	GB
1	y – Garden City Wind	46	36	10	.783	--
2	x – Trinidad Triggers	43	25	18	.581	9.5
3	Santa Fe Fuego	46	21	25	.457	15.0
4	Colorado Springs Snow Sox	45	14	31	.311	21.5

Mountain South Division Regular Season Standings
Pos	Team	G	W	L	Pct.	GB
1	y – Alpine Cowboys	49	32	17	.653	--
2	x – Roswell Invaders	49	27	22	.551	5.0
3	Austin Weirdos	50	19	31	.380	13.5
4	Weimar Hormigas	47	16	31	.340	15.0

Mountain Division Wild Card Standings
Pos	Team	G	W	L	Pct.	GB
1	x – Trinidad Triggers	43	25	18	.581	--
2	x – Roswell Invaders	49	27	22	.551	1.0
3	Santa Fe Fuego	46	21	25	.457	5.5
4	Austin Weirdos	50	19	31	.380	9.5
5	Weimar Hormigas	47	16	31	.340	11.0
6	Colorado Springs Snow Sox	45	14	31	.311	12.0

=== Pacific Division ===
Pacific North Division Regular Season Standings
Pos	Team	G	W	L	Pct.	GB
1	y – San Rafael Pacifics	50	41	9	.820	--
2	x – Santa Rosa Scuba Divers	51	22	29	.431	19.5
3	Martinez Sturgeon	50	19	31	.380	22.0
4	Santa Cruz Seaweed	50	17	33	.340	24.0

Pacific South Division Regular Season Standings
Pos	Team	G	W	L	Pct.	GB
1	y – Tucson Saguaros	42	34	8	.810	--
2	x – Bakersfield Train Robbers	49	31	18	.633	6.5
3	Monterey Amberjacks	50	21	29	.420	17.0
4	Wasco Reserve	47	7	40	.149	29.5

Pacific Division Wild Card Standings
Pos	Team	G	W	L	Pct.	GB
1	x – Bakersfield Train Robbers	49	31	18	.633	--
2	x – Santa Rosa Scuba Divers	51	22	29	.431	10.0
3	Monterey Amberjacks	50	21	29	.420	10.5
4	Martinez Sturgeon	50	19	31	.380	12.5
5	Santa Cruz Seaweed	50	17	33	.340	14.5
6	Wasco Reserve	47	7	40	.149	23.0

- y – Clinched division
- x – Clinched playoff spot

== Statistical leaders ==
General
Stat	Player	Team	Total
Games	Brenden Spaulding	Monterey Amberjacks	50

=== Hitting ===
Stat	Player	Team	Total
Hitter Score	Beau Dorman	San Rafael Pacifics	365
AB	Tyson Thompson	San Rafael Pacifics	205
AVG	Koki Matsuda	Garden City Wind	.476
OBS	Demetrio Rodriguez	Monterey Amberjacks	1.455
Runs	Beau Dorman	San Rafael Pacifics	74
H	Beau Dorman	San Rafael Pacifics	84
2B	Jonathon Bigley	Roswell invaders	19
3B	Joe Curcio, Robert Morosetti	Bakersfield Train Robbers, Roswell Invaders	5
HR	Jared Gay	Santa Fe Fuego	21
BB	Leo Gallegos	Roswell invaders	55
RBIs	Beau Dorman	San Rafael Pacifics	80
SB	Juan Montes	Roswell Invaders	43
CS	Dillian Smith	Roswell Invaders	9

=== Pitching ===
Stat	Player	Team	Total
Pitcher Score	Keisy Portorreal	Garden City Wind	127
W	Manny Corpas, Buzz Shirley	Martinez Sturgeon, Alpine Cowboys	9
L	Ike Horn	Wasco Reserve	7
SV	Pierce Smith, Devin Malone	Trinidad Triggers, Garden City Wind	7
ERA *min.2IP	Joe Riddle	Santa Cruz Seaweed	0.61
IP	Luke Kelley	Bakersfield Train Robbers	69.2
Hits allowed	Manny Corpas	Martinez Sturgeon	140
SO	Manny Corpas	Martinez Sturgeon	147
BB Allowed	Ike Horn	Wasco Reserve	78

== Awards ==
=== All-star selections ===
==== Mountain North Division ====
Hitters
Position	Player	Team
C	Tyler Carpenter	Fuego
C	Peter Peña	Triggers
C	Jake Urena	Triggers
1B	Leo Gallegos	Wind
1B	Jared Gay	Fuego
2B	Rory Graf-Brennen	Snow Sox
2B	Zach May	Triggers
2B	Devon Zielke	Wind
3B	Manny Cachora	Fuego
SS	David Arza	Triggers
SS	Phil Buckingham	Fuego
SS	Nick Sciubba	Triggers
OF	Peter Bocchino	Triggers
OF	Jesus Chavez	Fuego
OF	Parker DePasquale	Fuego
OF	Luis Hidalgo	Snow Sox
OF	Koki Matsuda	Wind
OF	Brandon Pugh	Wind
OF	Adam Purdy	Triggers
OF	Yaushi Sanematsu	Triggers
OF	Fernando Vazquez	Triggers

Pitchers
Player	Team
Ted Broxterman	Wind
Spenser Dexter	Snow Sox
Tyler Fisher	Snow Sox
Sage Holderfield	Wind
Devin Malone	Wind
Keisy Portorreal	Wind
Matt Sanchez	Fuego
Derrick Sylve	Triggers

==== Mountain South Division ====
Hitters
Position	Player	Team
C	Jack Matero	Invaders
C	Gabriel Murillo	Weirdos
1B	Bryce Donovan	Cowboys
3B	Sam Dreistadt	Cowboys
3B	Robert Morosetti	Invaders
3B	James Prockish	Cowboys
SS	Manny Garcia	Cowboys
SS	Anthony Ward	Hormigas
IF	Matt Rodriguez	Invaders
OF	Andrew Capone	Cowboys
OF	DeMarcus Kelly	Hormigas
OF	Juan Montes	Invaders
OF	Ray Sadler	Hormigas
OF	Dillan Smith	Invaders
OF	Mark Traylor	Cowboys

Pitchers
Player	Team
Jacob Banda	Hormigas
Michael Castillo	Cowboys
Jonathan Fleckenstein	Invaders
Buzz Shirley	Cowboys
Jarod Sprinkle	Invaders

==== Pacific North Division ====
Hitters
Position	Player	Team
C	Beau Dorman	Pacifics
C	Michael Green	Seaweed
C	James Portillo	Sturgeon
C	Jonathan Waite	Pacifics
1B	Nick Giambalvo	Seaweed
1B	Darwin Tavarez	Sturgeon
3B	Erik Mitchell	Seaweed
IF	Corey Davis	Pacifics
OF	John Bicos	Pacifics
OF	Sam Freedman	Scuba Divers
OF	Kevin Johnson	Sturgeon
OF	Jalil Marinez	Pacifics
OF	Tyson Thompson	Pacifics
OF	Max Tracey	Scuba Divers

Pitchers
Player	Team
Mark Dozier	Pacifics
Kohto Hasegawa	Pacifics
Sean Holt	Scuba Divers
Mike Manley	Pacifics
Joe Riddle	Seaweed
Jayson Summers	Pacifics

==== Pacific South Division ====
Hitters
Position	Player	Team
C	Brandon Douglas	Train Robbers
C	Caden Ledbetter	Saguaros
1B	Brock Ephan	Saguaros
1B	Ben Osborne	Reserve
1B	Kendon Strachan	Saguaros
1B	Seth Strong	Train Robbers
IF	Brody Perkes	Reserve
OF	Brandon Bradshaw	Saguaros
OF	Joe Curcio	Train Robbers
OF	Jesus Grimaldo	Reserve
OF	Steve Joyner	Saguaros
OF	BJ Minarcin	Saguaros
OF	Joseph Nunn Jr.	Train Robbers
OF	Brenden Spaulding	Amberjacks
OF	Blake Vandiver	Train Robbers

Pitchers
Player	Team
Christopher Coipel	Amberjacks
Jonny Damon	Train Robbers
Frank Dickson IV	Saguaros
Blake Garrett	Saguaros
Luke Kelley	Train Robbers
Ian McCole	Saguaros
Quentin Oexner	Reserve
Ryan Osborne	Reserve
Jesse Palafox	Saguaros
Brendon Rodriguez	Saguaros
Tyler Rumbaugh	Saguaros
Blake Svoboda	Amberjacks
Hunter Treece	Saguaros

=== End of year awards ===
Pacific Division
Award	Player	Team
MVP	Beau Dorman	Pacifics
Hitter Of The Year	Brock Ephan	Saguaros
Pitcher Of The Year	Ethan Mcrae	Amberjacks

Mountain Division
Award	Player	Team
MVP	Mark Traylor	Cowboys
Hitter Of The Year	Juan Montes	Invaders
Pitcher of The Year	Keisy Portorreal	Wind

== Playoffs ==
=== Format ===
1. Eight teams will qualify for the playoffs

2. The team with the best record in each division will qualify as the division winner. (Mountain North, Mountain South, Pacific North, Pacific South)

3. Each Division Mountain and Pacific will have two teams that are non-division winners with the best record regardless of division.

4. Playoff Location will be determined by ballpark availability, the proximity of travel, and standings. When possible in the first round both teams will host a playoff game.

5. First Round will feature (4) seed vs (1) and seed (2) seed vs (3) seed in a Best of 3 series

6. Second Round will feature Winners of each first-round series in the division finals Best of 3 series

7. Finals Round will feature Winners of Mountain Division vs Winners of Pacific Division at location TBD.

=== Playoff bracket ===
First Round (best-of-three)
1	Garden City Wind	8	5	3
4	Roswell Invaders	13	4	6
Mountain
2	Alpine Cowboys	10	1	5
3	Trinidad Triggers	7	8	7
1	San Rafael Pacifics	22	10
4	Santa Rosa Scuba Divers	3	9
Pacific
2	Tucson Saguaros	13	6
3	Bakersfield Train Robbers	4	4

Division Championship Series (best-of-three)
4	Roswell Invaders	7	12	7
3	Trinidad Triggers	8	10	5
1	San Rafael Pacifics	2	4
2	Tucson Saguaros	10	5

Pecos League Championship Series (best-of-three)
Roswell Invaders	6	4	5
Tucson Saguaros	3	5	2

== See also ==
- 2022 Major League Baseball season
- 2022 American Association season
- 2022 Frontier League season
