= 2023 Pecos League season =

13th season of the Pecos League

- League: Pecos League
- Sport: Baseball
- Duration: May 25 – July 30 (Playoffs: July 31 – August 12)
- Number of games: 50 (400 games in total)
- Number of teams: 16

Mountain Division
- League champions: Tucson Saguaros

Pacific Division
- League champions: San Rafael Pacifics

Pecos League Championship
- Champions: San Rafael Pacifics
- Runners-up: Tucson Saguaros

Seasons
- ← 2022 2024 →

The 2023 Pecos League season was the 13th season of professional baseball in the Pecos League, an independent baseball league which operates in cities in desert mountain regions throughout California, New Mexico, Arizona, Colorado, Kansas and Texas, since its creation in August 2010. There are 16 Pecos League teams, split evenly between Mountain and Pacific divisions.

The Roswell Invaders entered the season as the defending champions, having defeated the Tucson Saguaros, two games to one, in the league's 2022 championship series.

Andrew Dunn returned as commissioner for the 2023 season.

== Season schedule ==
The 16 teams in the league are split evenly between two divisions, Mountain and Pacific.

For the 2023 season, the league announced three expansion franchises: the Lancaster Sound Breakers, Marysville Drakes, and the Blackwell FlyCatchers.

After competing in 2022, the Weimar Hormigas, Colorado Springs Snow Sox, and Wasco Reserve were not included as a member club in 2023. The Santa Cruz Seaweed moved to Vallejo, California.

The season was played with a 50-game schedule with opening day in the Pacific Division on May 25, and opening day in the Mountain Division on May 31. The Regular season in both divisions will conclude on July 30.

The Pecos League remains split into the Mountain Division and Pacific Division.

The top four teams in their respective divisions will qualify for the playoffs. The Playoffs will consist of three rounds, ending with the Champion of the Mountain Division facing the winner of the Pacific Division.

== Regular season standings ==
Mountain Division Regular Season Standings
Pos	Team	G	W	L	Pct.	GB
1	y – Tucson Saguaros	47	34	13	.723	--
2	x – Alpine Cowboys	52	36	16	.692	0.5
3	x – Trinidad Triggers	49	30	19	.612	5.0
4	x – Garden City Wind	50	30	20	.600	5.5
5	e – Roswell Invaders	52	29	23	.558	7.5
6	e – Blackwell FlyCatchers	42	17	25	.405	14.5
7	e – Santa Fe Fuego	48	17	31	.354	17.5
8	e – Austin Weirdos	48	1	47	.021	33.5

Pacific Division Regular Season Standings
Pos	Team	G	W	L	Pct.	GB
1	y – San Rafael Pacifics	47	39	8	.830	--
2	x – Monterey Amberjacks	49	31	18	.633	9.0
3	x – Bakersfield Train Robbers	47	29	18	.617	10.0
4	x – Lancaster Sound Breakers	50	28	22	.560	12.5
5	e – Marysville Drakes	50	27	23	.540	13.5
6	e – Martinez Sturgeon	49	25	24	.510	15.0
7	e – Vallejo Seaweed	49	12	37	.245	28.0
8	e – Dublin Leprechauns	49	4	45	.082	36.0

- y – Clinched division
- x – Clinched playoff spot
- e – Eliminated from playoff contention

== Statistical leaders ==
General
Stat	Player	Team	Total
Games	Kyle Jenkins, Lyndon Weaver, Zachary Elias, Colton Adams, Seth Schroeder	Lancaster Sound Breakers, Marysville Drakes, Garden City Wind, Roswell Invaders, Roswell Invaders	50

=== Hitting ===
Stat	Player	Team	Total
Hitter Score	Jason Rooks	Trinidad Triggers	363
AB	Kyle Jenkins	Lancaster Sound Breakers	214
AVG	Evan Antonellis	Lancaster Sound Breakers	.500
OPS	Robert Perez	Martinez Sturgeon	3.000
Runs	Lyndon Weaver	Marysville Drakes	88
H	Seth Schroeder	Roswell Invaders	97
2B	Rick Phillips	Bakersfield Train Robbers	20
3B	Evan Antonellis, Christian Jones	Lancaster Sound Breakers, Bakersfield Train Robbers	7
HR	Jason Rooks	Trinidad Triggers	22
BB	Colton Adams	Roswell invaders	65
RBIs	Evan Antonellis	Lancaster Sound Breakers	87
SB	Robert Malone	Monterey Amberjacks	72
CS	Anthony Ward	Monterey Amberjacks	9

=== Pitching ===
Stat	Player	Team	Total
Pitcher Score	Bryson Spagnuolo	Alpine Cowboys	92
W	Humberto Vela, Matthew Hess, Greg Salazar, Kohto Hasegawa, Austin Toerner, Joe Riddle, Eric Parnow, Ben Kowalski	Roswell Invaders, Alpine Cowboys, Monterey Amberjacks, San Rafael Pacifics, Bakersfield Train Robbers, Bakersfield Train Robbers, San Rafael Pacifics, Trinidad Triggers	7
L	Christian Zellner, Wyatt Rowland	Dublin Leprechauns, Dublin Leprechauns	7
SV	Dominic Scotti, Jonathan Fleckenstein, Gavin Peterson	Monterey Amberjacks, Roswell Invaders, Garden City Wind	8
ERA *min.2IP	Alex Valasek	San Rafael Pacifics	1.68
IP	Harrison Aiken	Martinez Sturgeon	86.2
Hits allowed	Jared Chapman	Austin Weirdos	167
SO	Alex Valasek	San Rafael Pacifics	94
BB Allowed	Meltavis Robertson	Dublin Leprechauns	71

== Awards ==
=== All-star selections ===
==== Mountain Division ====
Hitters
Position	Player	Team
C	Dominic Embody	Wind
C	Colin Johnson	Saguaros
C	Peter Pena	Triggers
C	Jake Sisto	Cowboys
1B	Ben Osborne	Fuego
1B	Gabe Ramos	Saguaros
2B	Colton Adams	Invaders
2B	Zachary Campbell	Saguaros
2B	Alex Canty	Cowboys
3B	James Prockish	Cowboys
3B	Dillan Smith	Invaders
3B	Jake Urena	Triggers
SS	Manny Garcia	Cowboys
IF	David Arza	Triggers
IF	Peter Bocchino	Triggers
IF	Leo Gallegos	Wind
IF	Devon Zielke	Wind
OF	Jordan Anderson	Triggers
OF	Maurice La Fon	Fuego
OF	Cole Lee	Wind
OF	BJ Minarcin	Saguaros
OF	Robert Morosetti	Invaders
OF	Jason Rooks	Triggers
OF	Madison Santos	Saguaros
OF	Seth Schroeder	Invaders
OF	Kirkland Trahan	Saguaros
OF	Mark Traylor	Cowboys

Pitchers
Player	Team
Kyle Adkins	Wind
Alec Aleywine	Triggers
Garrett Brown	Triggers
Jaymon Cervantes	Saguaros
Travis Cole	Saguaros
Ian Concevitch	Invaders
Spenser Dexter	Triggers
Jonathan Fleckenstein	Invaders
Jordan Harris	Wind
Matthew Hess	Cowboys
Connor Kelly	Cowboys
Ben Kowalski	Triggers
Daulton Montagna	Saguaros
Jackson Smith	Saguaros
Bryson Spagnuolo	Cowboys
Josh Walker	Weirdos

==== Pacific Division ====
Hitters
Position	Player	Team
C	Sean Bennett	Amberjacks
C	Evan Blum	Drakes
C	Nate Duarte	Sound Breakers
C	Nick Smith	Pacifics
C	Paul Von Zboray	Train Robbers
1B	Joseph Starick	Drakes
3B	Evan Antonellis	Sound Breakers
3B	Chaison Miklich	Amberjacks
3B	Luke Smith	Sound Breakers
SS	Cain Agis	Sturgeon
SS	Jacob Jablonski	Sound Breakers
SS	Declan Peterson	Drakes
SS	Joshua Rodriguez	Amberjacks
SS	Grant Victor	Pacifics
SS	Anthony Ward	Amberjacks
IF	Ike Brown	Seaweed
IF	Tevin Brown	Train Robbers
IF	Braxton King	Seaweed
IF	Kyle Montebon	Leprechauns
IF	Mickey Nunes	Seaweed
IF	Josue Rivera	Leprechauns
IF	Eric Whitfield	Sturgeon
OF	Nick Adgar	Sturgeon
OF	Sam Freedman	Sturgeon
OF	Dandre Gaines	Seaweed
OF	Kyle Guerra	Pacifics
OF	Sean Jackson	Seaweed
OF	Kyle Jenkins	Sound Breakers
OF	Kevin Johnson	Pacifics
OF	Luke Johnson	Sturgeon
OF	Christian Jones	Train Robbers
OF	Robert Malone	Amberjacks
OF	Rick Phillips	Train Robbers
OF	Christian Quezada	Sound Breakers
OF	Joe Riddle	Train Robbers
OF	Max Tracey	Train Robbers
OF	Lyndon Weaver	Drakes

Pitchers
Player	Team
Harrison Aiken	Sturgeon
Craig Broadman	Sturgeon
Tristan Cavazos	Amberjacks
AJ Chacon	Sound Breakers
Tyler Hopper	Sound Breakers
Simon Martinez	Pacifics
Evan Nakagawa	Drakes
Ruben Portillo	Train Robbers
Quentin Oexner	Seaweed
Gilberto Rosario	Sound Breakers
Rodrigo Sanchez	Drakes
Dominic Scotti	Amberjacks
Alex Valasek	Pacifics

=== End of year awards ===
Mountain Division
Award	Player	Team
MVP	James Prockish	Alpine Cowboys
Offensive Player Of The Year	Jason Rooks	Trinidad Triggers
Pitcher Of The Year	Jaymon Cervantes	Tucson Saguaros

Pacific Division
Award	Player	Team
MVP	Tristan Cavazos	Monterey Amberjacks
Offensive Player Of The Year	Evan Antonellis	Lancaster Sound Breakers
Pitcher of The Year	Alex Valasek	San Rafael Pacifics

== Playoffs ==
=== Format ===
1. Eight teams will qualify for the playoffs

2. The team with the best record in each division will qualify as the division winner and be the number 1 seed. (Mountain and Pacific)

3. Each Division, Mountain and Pacific, will have the top four teams make the playoffs.

4. Playoff Location will be determined by ballpark availability, the proximity of travel, and standings. Both teams will host a playoff game when possible in the first round.

5. First Round will feature (4) seed vs. (1) seed and (2) seed vs. (3) seed in a Best of 3 series

6. Second Round will feature Winners of each first-round series in the division finals Best of 3 series

7. Finals Round will feature Winners of the Mountain Division vs Winners of the Pacific Division at location TBD.

=== Playoff bracket ===
First Round (best-of-three)
1	Tucson Saguaros	12	19	X
4	Garden City Wind	1	5	X
Mountain
2	Alpine Cowboys	8	3	1
3	Trinidad Triggers	10	2	3
1	San Rafael Pacifics	12	4	X
4	Lancaster Sound Breakers	3	0	X
Pacific
2	Monterey Amberjacks	4	11	4
3	Bakersfield Train Robbers	12	10	13

Division Championship Series (best-of-three)
1	Tucson Saguaros	8	12	X
3	Trinidad Triggers	5	7	X
1	San Rafael Pacifics	5	9	X
3	Bakersfield Train Robbers	1	8	X

Pecos League Championship Series (best-of-three)
M1	Tucson Saguaros	3	4	0
P1	San Rafael Pacifics	5	0	2

== See also ==
- 2023 Major League Baseball season
- 2023 Nippon Professional Baseball season
- 2023 KBO League season
- 2023 Mexican League season
- 2023 Chinese Professional Baseball League season
- 2023 Frontier League season
- 2023 Pioneer League season
