= North Platte 80s =

Professional baseball team in Nebraska

- Logo

Information
- League: Pecos League (Mountain North Division)
- Location: North Platte, Nebraska
- Ballpark: Bill Wood Field
- Founded: 2023
- Colors: Denim blue and Corvette red
- Manager: Todd Everleth
- Website: www.northplatte80s.com

The North Platte 80s are a professional baseball team based in North Platte, Nebraska, that began play in 2024. They are a member of the Mountain North Division of the Pecos League, an independent baseball league which is not affiliated with Major League Baseball or Minor League Baseball. They play their home games at Bill Wood Field.

== History ==
The city of North Platte, Nebraska, was previously home to the North Platte Buffalos from 1928 to 1932 and the North Platte Indians from 1956 to 1959, both of which played in the Nebraska State League. It also hosted three teams in the semi-pro Nebraska Independent League: an unnamed club from 1936 to 1937 followed by two iterations of the North Platte Plainsmen (originally the Flynns) from 1946 to 1955 and from 1961 to 1964. The name was revived by the North Platte Plainsmen of Independence League Baseball, a collegiate wood-bat league, in 2022.

On November 14, 2023, the North Platte 80s were announced as an expansion team in the Pecos League, which were being brought in by the league ahead of the 2024 season to replace the defunct Lancaster Sound Breakers. The team was named after Interstate 80, which passes through North Platte, as well as the "Forgotten Era" of the 1980s, during which the National League played with no designated hitter rule (as does the Pecos League). It was also announced that the 80s would be taking over Bill Wood Field from the Plainsmen as their home ballpark. Todd Everleth was announced as the team's inaugural manager in March 2024.

The North Platte 80s played their first official game on May 28, 2024, suffering a 13–10 defeat to the Tucson Saguaros at Bill Wood Field. Christian Foote recorded the first hit and scored the first run in franchise history. On May 30, the 80s relinquished a 16-run lead and were defeated by the Santa Fe Fuego, 27–26, following nearly five hours of play. After losing their first six games of the season, the 80s achieved their first-ever victory on June 5, beating the Blackwell FlyCatchers, 10–9, in eleven innings at Bill Wood Field. The team finished its inaugural season with a 16–33 record, failing to qualify for the playoffs.

== Roster ==
North Platte 80s roster
Players		Coaches
Pitchers: 14 (United States) Zach Byron; 6 (United States) Ira Clifton; 13 (United States) Garrett Flaagan; 15 (United States) Luke Harris; 3 (United States) Preston Hitchens; 24 (United States) James Kobylt; 17 (United States) Grant LaBelle; 10 (United States) Carson McCurdy; 4 (United States) Nick Neighbours; 1 (United States) Brock Pare; 25 (United States) Austin Salemi; 19 (United States) Cole Smith; 29 (United States) Bishop Woods	Catchers: 21 (United States) Lucas Rincon; 20 (United States) Gustavo Suarez; Infielders: 8 (United States) Jake Boucher; 16 (United States) Zach Evenson; 9 (United States) Stephen Kent; 26 (United States) Tommy Ramos; 12 (United States) Ivan Santos; Outfielders: 7 (United States) TJ Beninati; 5 (United States) Darrius Bomer; 2 (United States) Hunter Daymond; 11 (United States) Kyle Jenson	Manager: -- (United States) Todd Everleth; Coaches; Roster updated on May 27, 2026

== Season-by-season records ==
North Platte 80s
Season	League	Division	Record	Win %	Finish	Manager	Playoffs
2024	Pecos	Mountain North	16–33	.327	4th	Todd Everleth	Did not qualify
2025	Pecos	Mountain North	27–21	.563	2nd	Todd Everleth	Won first round vs. Blackwell 2–0; Lost quarterfinals to Garden City 0–2
2026	Pecos	Mountain North	16–35–1	.317	4th	Todd Everleth	Did not qualify
Totals			59–89–1	.399	—	—	2–2 (.500)
