= 2024 Pecos League season =

14th season of the Pecos League

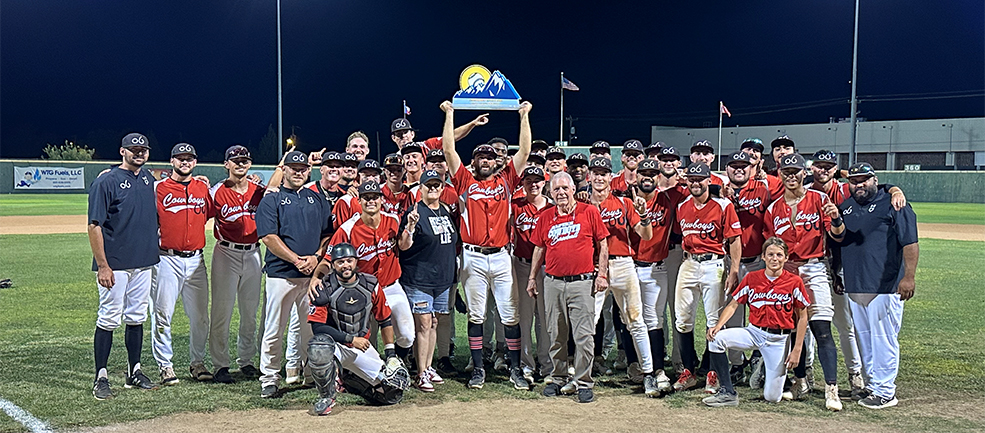
- League: Pecos League
- Sport: Baseball
- Duration: May 22 – July 28 (Playoffs: July 29 – August 11)
- Games: 54 (432 games in total)
- Teams: 16

Mountain Division
- League champions: Alpine Cowboys

Pacific Division
- League champions: San Rafael Pacifics

Pecos League Championship
- Champions: Alpine Cowboys
- Runners-up: San Rafael Pacifics

Seasons
- ← 2023 2025 →

The 2024 Pecos League season was the 14th season of professional baseball in the Pecos League, an independent baseball league which operates in cities in desert mountain regions throughout California, New Mexico, Arizona, Colorado, Kansas, Oklahoma, and Texas, since its creation in August 2010. There are 16 Pecos League teams, split between the Mountain and Pacific divisions.

The San Rafael Pacifics entered the season as the defending champions, having defeated the Tucson Saguaros, two games to one, in the league's 2023 championship series.

Andrew Dunn returned as commissioner for the 2024 season.

The season concluded with the Alpine Cowboys defeating the San Rafael Pacifics two games to zero to capture their third title in franchise history.

== Season schedule ==
The 16 teams in the league are split between two divisions, Mountain and Pacific. The Mountain Division contains 10 teams, while the Pacific Division contains 6 teams.

For the 2024 season, the Lancaster Sound Breakers and Monterey Amberjacks did not return. The Sound Breakers folded due to the city of Lancaster entering into a lease with a soccer organization to use The Hangar, leaving the Sound Breakers without a stadium. The City of Monterey reportedly did not renew its contract with the league, but the Amberjacks plan to return in 2025.

To replace the Sound Breakers and Amberjacks, the league brought in two new teams for the season, the North Platte 80s and the Pecos Bills. Both of which are the first time that each city has had a team in the league.

The season was played with a 54-game schedule with opening day in the Pacific Division on May 22, and opening day in the Mountain Division on May 27. The Regular season in both divisions will conclude on July 28.

The Pecos League remains split into the Mountain Division and Pacific Division.

The top four teams in the Pacific Division and the top six teams in the Mountain Division will qualify for the playoffs. The Playoffs will consist of four rounds, ending with the Champion of the Mountain Division facing the winner of the Pacific Division.

=== Record vs. opponents ===
2024 Pacific Division Record vs. opponents
Team	BAK	DUB	MTZ	MRY	SRF	VAL
Bakersfield	—	5–6	9–3	6–4	7–3	6–5
Dublin	6–5	—	8–3	4–7	3–8	3–7
Martinez	3–9	3–8	—	5–5	4–7	5–5
Marysville	4–6	7–4	5–5	—	5–6	8–4
San Rafael	3–7	8–3	7–4	6–5	—	7–4
Vallejo	5–6	7–3	5–5	4–8	4–7	—

2024 Mountain Division Record vs. opponents
Team	ALP	AUS	BLA	GCW	NPL	PEC	ROS	SAF	TRI	TUC
Alpine	—	6–0	0–0	2–1	0–0	17–0	9–1	4–0	0–0	7–2
Austin	0–6	—	0–6	0–6	1–4	1–5	4–2	1–4	0–6	1–4
Blackwell	0–0	6–0	—	1–8	8–3	2–0	1–2	4–2	5–5	0–2
Garden City	1–2	6–0	8–1	—	11–3	5–1	1–1	5–0	3–1	2–0
North Platte	0–0	4–1	3–8	3–11	—	0–0	2–1	2–2	2–8	0–2
Pecos	0–17	5–1	0–2	1–5	0–0	—	3–2	2–3	0–0	3–8
Roswell	1–9	2–4	2–1	1–1	1–2	2–3	—	4–2	4–2	3–6
Sante Fe	0–4	4–1	2–4	0–5	2–2	3–2	2–4	—	1–12	2–1
Trinidad	0–0	6–0	5–5	1–3	8–2	0–0	2–4	12–1	—	0–2
Tucson	2–7	4–1	2–0	0–2	2–0	8–3	6–3	1–2	2–0	—

== Regular season standings ==
Mountain Division South Regular Season Standings
Pos	Team	G	W	L	Pct.	GB
1	y – Alpine Cowboys	49	45	4	.918	--
2	x – Tucson Saguaros	45	27	18	.600	16.0
3	x – Roswell Invaders	50	20	30	.400	25.5
4	e – Pecos Bills	52	14	38	.269	32.5
5	e – Austin Weirdos	51	8	43	.157	38.0

Mountain Division North Regular Season Standings
Pos	Team	G	W	L	Pct.	GB
1	y – Garden City Wind	51	42	9	.824	--
2	x – Trinidad Triggers	51	34	17	.667	8.0
3	x – Blackwell FlyCatchers	49	27	22	.551	14.0
4	e – North Platte 80s	49	16	33	.327	25.0
5	e – Santa Fe Fuego	51	16	35	.314	26.0

Mountain Division Wild Card Standings
Pos	Team	G	W	L	Pct.	GB
1	x – Blackwell FlyCatchers	49	27	22	.551	--
2	x – Roswell Invaders	50	20	30	.400	7.5
3	e – North Platte 80s	49	16	33	.327	11.0
4	e – Santa Fe Fuego	51	16	35	.314	12.0
5	e – Pecos Bills	52	14	38	.269	14.5
6	e – Austin Weirdos	51	8	43	.157	20.0

Pacific Division Regular Season Standings
Pos	Team	G	W	L	Pct.	GB
1	y – Bakersfield Train Robbers	54	33	21	.611	--
2	x – San Rafael Pacifics	54	31	23	.574	2.0
3	x – Marysville Drakes	54	29	25	.537	4.0
4	x – Vallejo Seaweed	54	25	29	.463	8.0
5	e – Dublin Leprechauns	54	24	30	.444	9.0
6	e – Martinez Sturgeon	54	20	34	.370	13.0

- y – Clinched division
- x – Clinched playoff spot
- e – Eliminated from playoff contention

== Statistical leaders ==
General
Stat	Player	Team	Total
Games	Jalyn Lee, Joe Starick	Bakersfield Train Robbers, Marysville Drakes	54

=== Hitting ===
Stat	Player	Team	Total
Hitter Score	Noah McCreary	Bakersfield Train Robbers	326
AB	Mark Hernandez	San Rafael Pacifics	231
AVG	Josh Rego	Alpine Cowboys	.453
OPS	Dalton Brousseau	Marysville Drakes	4.000
Runs	Mickey Nunes	Vallejo Seaweed	78
H	Noah McCreary	Bakersfield Train Robbers	92
2B	Jacob Mitchell	Trinidad Triggers	20
3B	Zac Rice, Gavy Perez-Torres, AJ Folds	Tucson Saguaros, Tucson Saguaros, Alpine Cowboys	5
HR	Joey Dice	Blackwell FlyCatchers	16
BB	Joey Dice	Blackwell FlyCatchers	69
RBIs	Donnie Gardiner	Dublin Leprechauns	71
SB	Drake Angeron	Alpine Cowboys	53
CS	Joey Dice	Blackwell FlyCatchers	11

=== Pitching ===
Stat	Player	Team	Total
Pitcher Score	Alex Valasek, Brendan Beard	San Rafael Pacifics, Garden City Wind	133
W	Brendan Beard, Brayde Hirai	Garden City Wind, Alpine Cowboys	8
L	Alex Bolton, Makano Fo	Roswell Invaders, Dublin Leprechauns	8
SV	Adam Wibert	Garden City Wind	11
ERA *min.2IP	Brayde Hirai	Alpine Cowboys	1.96
IP	Christian Zellner	Vallejo Seaweed	80 1/3
Hits allowed	Christian Zellner	Vallejo Seaweed	131
SO	Alex Valasek	San Rafael Pacifics	102
BB Allowed	Jacob Strobel	Austin Weirdos	68

== Awards ==
=== All-star selections ===
==== South ====
Hitters
Position	Player	Team
C	Peyten Kennard	Cowboys
C	Cedric Reynaud	Saguaros
1B	Josh Rego	Cowboys
1B	Lucas Scott	Invaders
2B	Zach Campbell	Saguaros
2B	Oscar Galvez	Weirdos
2B	David Jeffers	Bills
3B	James Prockish	Cowboys
3B	Luke Smith	Bills
SS	Marcos Cabrera	Weirdos
SS	Taylor Darden	Cowboys
SS	Luis Moreno	Invaders
SS	Gavy Perez-Torres	Saguaros
OF	Drake Angeron	Cowboys
OF	Andrew Baker	Saguaros
OF	AJ Folds	Cowboys

Pitchers
Player	Team
Saul Arias	Bills
Jorge Canez	Invaders
Jay Cervantes	Saguaros
Travis Cole	Saguaros
Alec Cruz	Cowboys
Kyle Dalton	Saguaros
Jonathan Fleckenstein	Cowboys
Brayde Hirai	Cowboys
Wilbur Rodriguez	Invaders
Dom Spinoso	Cowboys
Humberto Vela	Cowboys
Jacob Young	Invaders

==== North ====
Hitters
Position	Player	Team
C	Dominic Enbody	Wind
C	Jakobe Smith	Triggers
1B	Damon Burroughs	FlyCatchers
1B	Coby Tweten	80s
2B	Humberto Maldonado	Triggers
2B	Aric Vasquez	Wind
3B	Jeremy DiBartolomeo	Fuego
3B	Jacob Mitchell	Triggers
SS	Joey Dice	FlyCatchers
OF	Jordan Anderson	Triggers
OF	Rob Morosetti	Wind
OF	Ramifer Salinas	FlyCatchers
OF	Rodney Scarver	Fuego
OF	Jack Skantze	FlyCatchers
OF	Jacob Talamante	Wind
OF	Jordan Williams	Wind

Pitchers
Player	Team
Brendan Beard	Wind
Marty Carnahan	FlyCatchers
Tristan Cavazos	Fuego
Eli Davis	FlyCatchers
Will Hahnfeld	Wind
Kaden Kneip	FlyCatchers
Ben Kowlaski	Triggers
Paul Mendoza	Triggers
Jake Norris	Wind
Nico O'Donnell	Wind
Adam Wibert	Wind
Kerry Wright	80s

==== East ====
Hitters
Position	Player	Team
C	Isaiah Clark	Sturgeon
1B	Andrew Curran	Sturgeon
1B	Jalyn Lee	Train Robbers
1B	Caleb Natov	Sturgeon
2B	Noah McCreary	Train Robbers
SS	Tyler Best	Sturgeon
SS	Josh Leslie	Drakes
INF	Jumpei Ohashi	Drakes
OF	Alex Miller	Train Robbers
OF	Tony Riley	Sturgeon
OF	Ashanti Ross	Train Robbers
OF	Joe Starick	Drakes

Pitchers
Player	Team
Earl Johnson	Drakes
Bryan Krolikowski	Drakes
Kyle Langston	Train Robbers
Jayden Metz	Train Robbers
Garrett Mos	Drakes
Jacob Perez	Train Robbers
Joe Riddle	Train Robbers
Gabriel Rojas	Sturgeon
Mike Vochelli	Drakes

==== West ====
Hitters
Position	Player	Team
C	Beau Dorman	Pacifics
C	Chase Evans	Leprechauns
C	Donnie Gardiner	Leprechauns
1B	Blake Diggle	Pacifics
3B	Chris Blyskal	Pacifics
SS	Esai Santos	Pacifics
INF	Ike Brown	Seaweed
INF	Thomas Latham	Seaweed
INF	Mickey Nunes	Seaweed
OF	John Bicos	Pacifics
OF	Theodore Bridges	Leprechauns
OF	Aki Buckson	Pacifics
OF	Trey Fletcher	Seaweed
OF	Mark Hernandez	Pacifics
OF	Angus Stayte	Leprechauns
OF	Jonathan Williams	Leprechauns

Pitchers
Player	Team
Karon Casey	Pacifics
Tanner Fonoti	Leprechauns
David Gustafson	Seaweed
Antonio Straughter	Seaweed
Alex Valasek	Pacifics
Owen Cuffe	Pacifics

=== End of year awards ===
Mountain Division
Award	Player	Team
MVP	Taylor Darden	Alpine Cowboys
Offensive Player Of The Year	Josh Rego	Alpine Cowboys
Pitcher Of The Year	Brendan Beard	Garden City Wind

Pacific Division
Award	Player	Team
MVP	Joe Riddle	Bakersfield Train Robbers
Offensive Player Of The Year	Noah McCreary	Bakersfield Train Robbers
Pitcher of The Year	Alex Valasek	San Rafael Pacifics

Staff Awards:

Broadcaster Of The Year (Pacific): Todd Kuhen, Drakes

Broadcaster Of The Year (Mountain): Joey Dean, Wind

Attendance Leader: Bakersfield Train Robbers

Photographer Of The Year: Brad Kirby, Triggers

Mascot Of The Year: Zozobra, Fuego

Musician Of The Year: Keith Lokey, Fuego

General Manager Of The Year: Eric Halverson, Sturgeon

== Playoffs ==
=== Format ===
1. Ten teams will qualify for the playoffs

2. The team with the best record in each division will qualify as the division winner and be the number 1 seed. (Mountain and Pacific)

3. The Mountain Division will have its top 6 teams qualify for the playoffs. While the Pacific Division will have its top 4 teams qualify.

4. Playoff Location will be determined by ballpark availability, the proximity of travel, and standings. Both teams will host a playoff game when possible in the first round.

5. The (1) and (2) seed in the Mountain division will earn byes into the second round.

=== Playoff bracket ===
First Round (best-of-three)
Tucson Saguaros	22	14	X
Roswell Invaders	4	10	X
Trinidad Triggers	6	5	X
Blackwell FlyCatchers	4	3	X
N/A	X	X	X
N/A	X	X	X
N/A	X	X	X
N/A	X	X	X

Second Round (best-of-three)
1	Alpine Cowboys	1	15	5
4	Tucson Saguaros	4	11	4
Mountain
2	Garden City Wind	11	9	X
3	Trinidad Triggers	5	7	X
1	Bakersfield Train Robbers	6	10	9
4	Vallejo Seaweed	12	4	3
Pacific
2	San Rafael Pacifics	3	18	4
3	Marysville Drakes	8	6	3

Division Championship Series (best-of-three)
1	Alpine Cowboys	11	5	X
2	Garden City Wind	0	4	X
1	Bakersfield Train Robbers	13	6	2
2	San Rafael Pacifics	4	8	9

Pecos League Championship Series (best-of-three)
M1	Alpine Cowboys	24	12	X
P2	San Rafael Pacifics	4	10	X

== See also ==
- 2024 American Association season
- 2024 Frontier League season
- 2024 Major League Baseball season
