= Marysville Drakes =

Independent baseball team in Marysville, California

Information
- League: Pecos League (Pacific Division)
- Location: Marysville, California
- Ballpark: Bryant Field
- Founded: 2023
- Folded: 2024
- Colors: Green, yellow, red
- Ownership: Andrew Dunn
- General manager: Mike Williams
- Manager: Bill Rogan
- Website: www.marysvilledrakes.com

Current uniforms
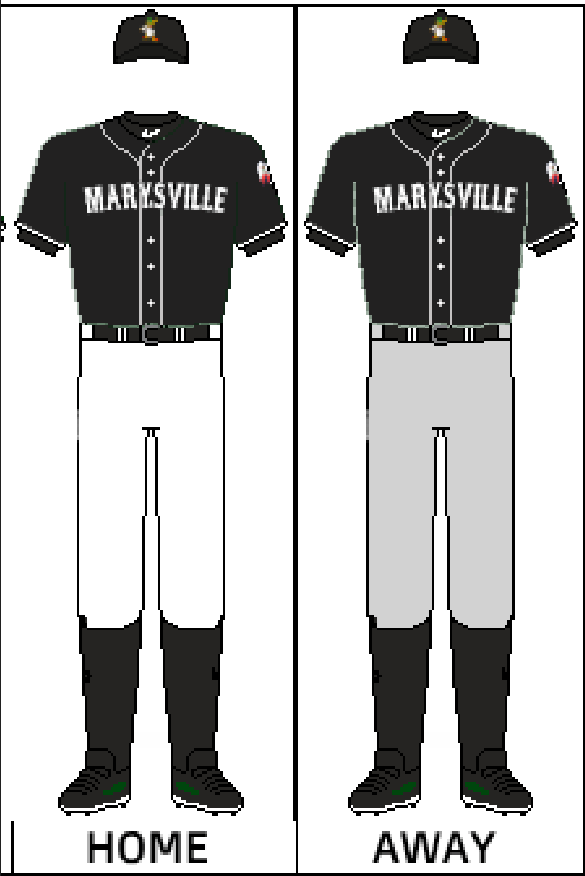

The Marysville Drakes were a professional baseball team based in Marysville, California. They competed in the Pacific Division of the Pecos League, an independent baseball league that is not affiliated with Major or Minor League Baseball. The Drakes played their home games at Bryant Field. The team folded after the 2024 season.

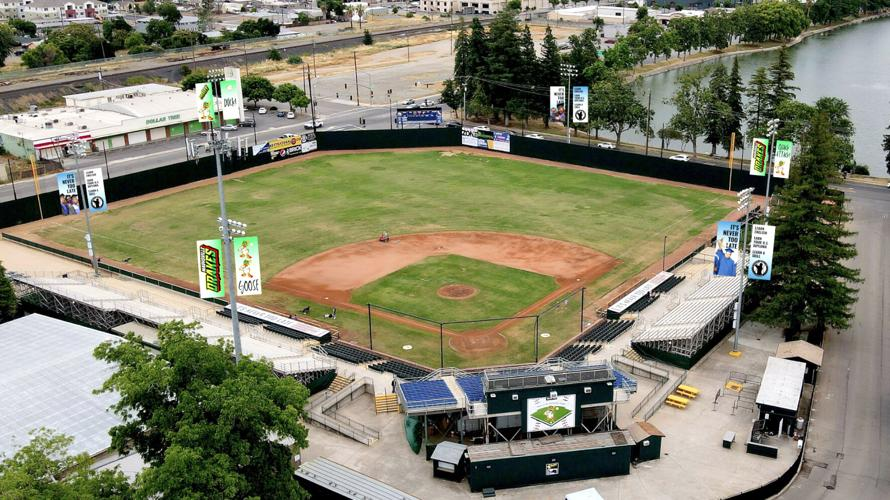
Bryant Field after the 2023 renovation

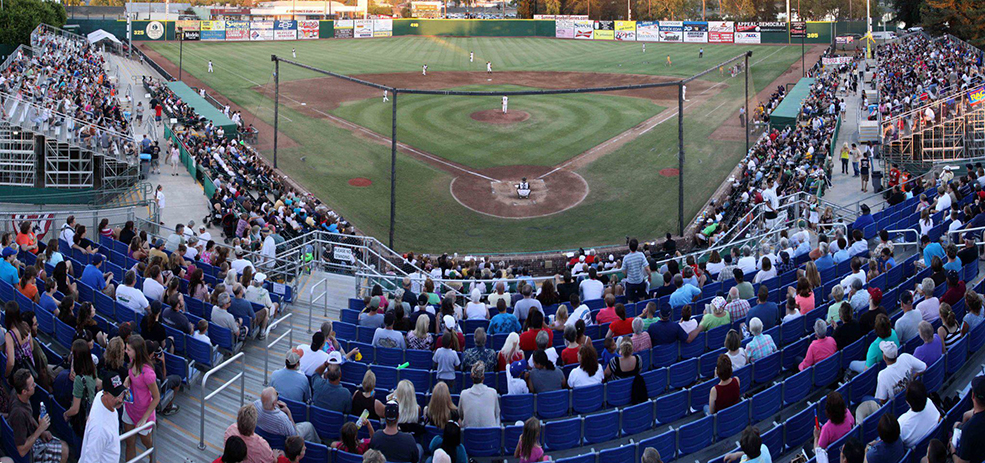
Marysville Drakes at Bryant Field

== History ==
=== 2022–2023: Development ===
Before 2023, the city of Marysville was home to the Yuba-Sutter Gold Sox from 2002 to 2022 and ended operations due to lack of return on investment as well as ownership abandoning the team, leaving it in permanent hiatus and making Bryant Field abandoned.

Entering into the year 2023, the Marysville Drakes were admitted into the Pecos League. Attempts to find a home for the Drakes to play, the Drakes Organization worked with the Marysville City Council, Highlands Community Charter School, as well as the community to fund the introduction and upkeep of a new professional baseball team, ultimately proposing a deal to occupy the vacant Bryant Field. The final deal allowed funding for a stadium renovation, including re-painting the outfield fence, re-doing the pitch and field, and remodeling the dugouts of the stadium, as well as allowed the local Highlands Community Charter School to use the facilities for 3 years (2023–2026).

=== 2023–present: Pecos League ===
Starting the 2023 season, the Drakes appointed manager Bill Rogan, a manager who had managed since 2018. The Marysville Drakes began their inaugural season and home game against the Dublin Leprechauns on May 25, 2023, which resulted in a 26–6 win in the bottom of the 9th. The Drakes, resulting in a 27–22 record, missed the playoffs by one game.

On February 23, 2024, Bill Rogan and the Drakes announced their continuation into the 2024 season. Furthermore, Bill Rogan introduced Drake's new batch of jerseys, designed by himself.

=== 2024: Folding ===
After the 2024 season, commissioner Dunn announced that the Drakes had folded and would not return in 2025.

== Roster ==
Marysville Drakes Roster
Active Roster	Coaching Staff
Pitchers: 21 Dan Clemens; 99 AJ Cordova; 30 Jayden Drake; 49 Sam Hanson; 2 Earl Johnson; 19 Bryan Krolikowski; 1 Garrett Mos; 25 Tim Nichols; 86 Sergio Patsy; 33 Kohl Petersen; 13 Rodrigo Sanchez; 11 Bradley Thomas; Catchers: 24 Sean Connolly; 10 JD Leslie; 45 Brenton Thomas; Infielders: 23 Chris Cook; 15 Anders Green; 20 Jumpei Ohashi; 7 Declan Peterson; 81 Micah Walker; Outfielders: 17 Drake Ayala; 3 Caleb Harmond; 36 John Smith; 44 Joe Starick	Manager: -- Bill Rogan; Coaches: TBD; Disabled list; ‡ Inactive list; >§ Suspended list; Roster updated July 28, 2024 Transactions

== Season-by-season records ==
Marysville Drakes
Season	League	Division	Record	Win %	Finish	Manager	Playoffs
2023	Pecos	Pacific	27–23	.540	5th	Bill Rogan	Did not qualify
2024	Pecos	Pacific	29–25	.537	3rd	Bill Rogan	Lost Pacific Division Semifinals (San Rafael) 1-2
Totals			56–48	.538	—	—	1-2 (.333)

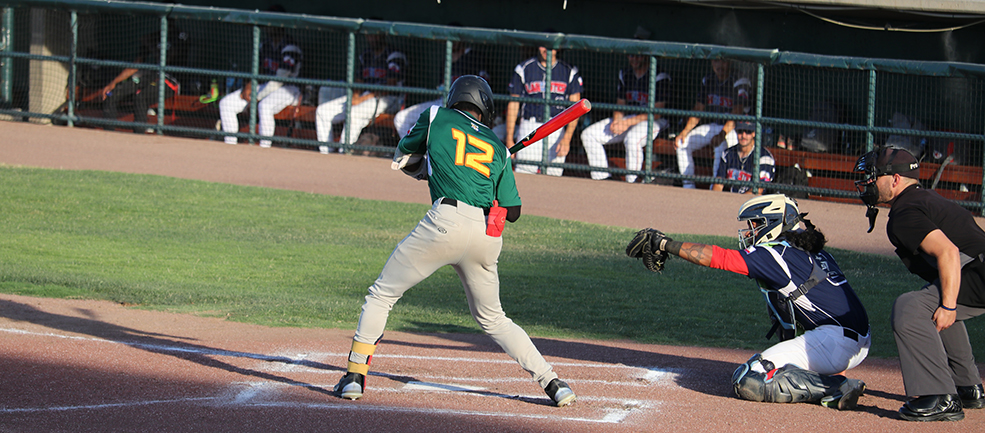
Gilberto Rosario at bat
