= San Rafael Pacifics =

Minor-league baseball team in San Rafael, California

Logo
Cap insignia

Information
- League: Pecos League
- Location: San Rafael, California
- Ballpark: Albert Park
- Founded: 2011
- League championships: 6 (NABL: 2012), (PA: 2014, 2015, 2018, 2019), (PL: 2023)
- Former leagues: North American League (2012); Pacific Association (2013–2019)
- Colors: Navy blue, light blue, white
- Ownership: Pecos League
- General manager: Austin Fitzpatrick
- Manager: Chris Johnson
- Website: www.pacificsbaseball.com

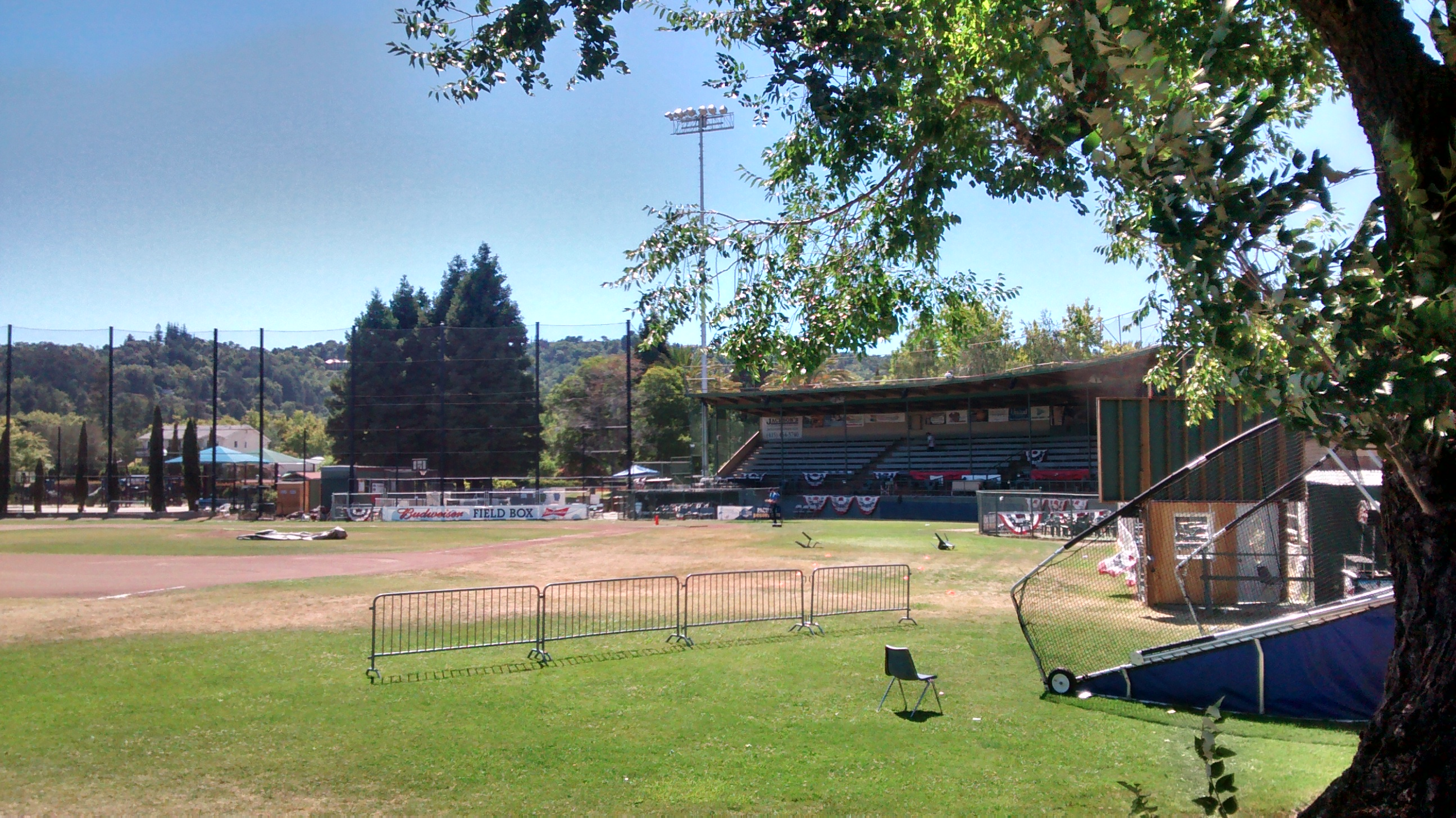
Albert Park

The San Rafael Pacifics are an American professional baseball team based in San Rafael, California, United States. They compete in the Pacific Division of the Pecos League, an independent baseball league which is not affiliated with Major or Minor League Baseball. They were previous members of the North American League and charter members of the Pacific Association. The Pacifics have played their homes games at Albert Park since 2012. The Pacifics were the winningest franchise of the Pacific Association, capturing four championships in seven seasons.

== History ==
=== 2012: North American League ===
On November 3, 2011, the team name Pacifics was selected. The franchise was launched by Centerfield Partners of Dublin, California but was sold to Red Sports and Entertainment Group on November 15. The Pacifics announced Mike Marshall as manager and Mike LaCoss as pitching coach in November.

With Calgary, Edmonton and Lake County folding in the North Division, the Pacifics ownership created a second franchise, the Sonoma County Grapes. Hawaii Baseball LLC, owners of Maui also started a second franchise, the Hawaii Stars. The four teams traveled to and from Hawaii and California to play each other. On April 2, the Pacifics announced the signing of Tomochika Tsuboi. On June 4, the Pacifics made their franchise debut, defeating the Grapes 3–1 at Albert Park. Former Fresno State College World Series champion and local player Steve Detwiler hit two home runs. San Rafael finished the season 34–26, defeating Maui in the North Division championship series. Outfielder Maikel Jova was named North American League Most Valuable Player and also held a 37 game hit streak. The North American Baseball League folded after the 2012 season and the Pacifics were the final champions of the league.

=== 2013–2019: Pacific Association ===
On January 14, 2013, it was announced that San Rafael would become charter members of the Pacific Association along with Hawaii, Sonoma County and Maui. Later it would be announced that the Vallejo Admirals would be taking place of the Grapes. On January 21, James Frisbie was announced as their new manager. The club also announced Stefan Wever as the bench coach. On March 20, Jeff Russell was announced as pitching coach. San Rafael opened their season with inter-league play against the Freedom Pro Baseball League of Arizona. After a 3–3 start, manager James Frisbee resigned and hitting coach Ryan Priddy was named manager. Shortly after, Frisbee joined the Rockford Aviators of the Frontier League. San Rafael finished with a 54–21 first place record but fell to Maui in the championship game. Infielder Price Kendall was named Most Valuable Player.

After the 2013 season, Maui and Hawaii folded. To fill the void, Sonoma and Pittsburg were added to the league. On December 11, Dan DiPace was named manager. After clinching the first-half Pacific Association title with a 23–16 record, President and GM Mike Shapiro announced manager DiPace left to pursue other baseball opportunities. For the second consecutive season, Priddy filled in as manager. In August, Eric Byrnes made his debut, where San Rafael donated a portion of ticket sales to the Pat Tillman foundation. The Pacifics won both halves of the season, earning them their first Pacific Association championship with a 48–30 record.

In 2015, former player Matt Kavanaugh was announced as manager. San Rafael finished with a 48–30 record, defeating Sonoma in the championship game. Matt Chavez was unanimously named the leagues Most Valuable Player. Over 66 games, Chavez had 31 home runs and 85 RBI while hitting for a .383 average. In August, he was signed by the Lake Elsinore Storm, the High-A affiliate of the San Diego Padres.

In the 2016 and 2017 seasons, San Rafael held a combined 73–83 record and did not make a post-season appearance.

In 2018, the Pacific Association expanded to six teams with the addition of Martinez and Napa. On May 28, Pacifics announced the signing of J. P. Howell. San Rafael finished second with a 50–30 regular season record. The Pacifics then defeated Vallejo and Sonoma in the post-season to claim their third league championship. Outfielder, Javion Randle was named Most Valuable Player. Pitcher Jared Koenig was named Pitcher of the Year. In late August, the team announced they were being put up for sale.

In December 2018, the franchise announced that the team was purchased by Gabe Suárez. For the 2019 season, it was announced that Martinez folded and Pittsburg would take a hiatus. The Salina Stockade joined as a traveling team. On May 16, Derrick Pyles was announced as manager, replacing Kavanaugh who guided the team to two championships in four seasons. After a 7–2 start to the season, the Suarez ownership group released Pyles of his duties. Oscar Suarez was named manager the following week. On June 29, former 2018 Pacifics' pitcher Chris Mazza made his Major League Baseball debut for the New York Mets, becoming the first Pacific Association player to make the major leagues. After a 38–26 regular season record, San Rafael defeated Napa and Sonoma, claiming their fourth championship. Shortstop Raúl Navarro was named Most Valuable Player. Reliever Jailen Peguero was named Co-Reliever of the Year.

=== 2020–Present: Pecos League ===
In November 2019, the Pacifics announced their departure from the Pacific Association, citing a desire to join a new independent league in Northern California for the 2020 season and beyond. The Pacifics were purchased by Andrew Dunn, founder of the Pecos League in March 2020 after the Pacifics and the Pacific Association agreed to not continue their affiliation due to major differences in operating a sound independent baseball league.

San Rafael was originally scheduled to appear in the Pacific Division of the 2020 Pecos League season, but ultimately had their season canceled due to the COVID-19 pandemic. In 2021, Stephen Leonetti was named manager. San Rafael finished 22–18 in the regular season and defeated the Martinez Sturgeon in the bay championship series.

In 2022, former player Kyle Ulanday was named manager. San Rafael finished with a Pecos League best 41–9 record but were defeated by the Tucson Saguaros in the Pacific Division championship series. On June 8, former Pacifics' pitcher Jared Koenig made his Major League Baseball debut for the Oakland Athletics, becoming the second Pacific to make the major leagues. Koenig won Pacific Association pitcher of the year in 2018, going 11-1 with a 3.54 ERA in 96 2/3 innings pitched. Koenig also set a Pacific Association record with 140 strikeouts.

On January 16, 2023, Austin Fitzpatrick was announced as manager. San Rafael finished with a 39–8 record and claimed their first Pecos League championship against Tucson.

== Roster ==
San Rafael Pacifics roster
Active roster	Coaching staff
Pitchers: 22 Karon Casey; 23 Owen Cuffe; 14 Caleb Davis; 40 Jake Dent; 12 Jason Hartwick; 39 Kohto Hasegawa; 2 Josh Idell; 21 Eric Parnow; 24 Xavier Stewart; 16 Jayson Summers; 4 Alex Valasek; 6 Marcus Watkins; Catchers: 7 Jakob Bouhuys; 36 Beau Dorman; 29 Nick Smith; Infielders: 11 Chris Blyskal; 10 Dan Crossan; 33 Blake Diggle; 25 Telly Hill; 13 Braxton King; 5 Esai Santos; 10 Fred Buckson; Outfielders: 32 John Bicos; 1 Aki Buckson; 15 Mark Hernandez; 3 Xavier Selway	Manager: 20 Austin Fitzpatrick; Coaches: TBD; Disabled list; ‡ Inactive list; § Suspended list; Roster updated July 17, 2024 Transactions

== Season-by-season results ==
San Rafael Pacifics
Season	League	Division	Overall	Win %	Finish	Manager	Playoffs
2012	NABL	North	34–26†	.567	1st	Mike Marshall	Won North Division championship series (Maui) 2–1
2013	PACA	—	54–21†	.720	1st	James Frisbie (3–3); Ryan Priddy (51–18)	Lost championship game (Maui)
2014	PACA	—	48–30	.615	1st in Division (first half); 1st in Division (second half)	Dan DiPace (23–16); Ryan Priddy (25–14)	First half winner; Second half winner; League Champions
2015	PACA	—	48–30†	.615	2nd in Division (first half); 1st in Division (second half)	Matt Kavanaugh	Won championship game (Sonoma)
2016	PACA	—	41–37	.526	2nd in Division (first half); 2nd in Division (second half)	Matt Kavanaugh	Did not qualify
2017	PACA	—	32–46	.410	3rd in Division (first half); T-3rd in Division (second half)	Matt Kavanaugh	Did not qualify
2018	PACA	—	50–30	.625	2nd	Matt Kavanaugh	Won semifinals (Vallejo); Won championship game (Sonoma)
2019	PACA	—	38–26	.594	2nd	Derrick Pyles (7–2); Oscar Suárez (31–24)	Won Semifinals (Napa); Won championship series (Sonoma) 2–1
2020	Pecos	Season cancelled (COVID-19 pandemic)					
2021	Pecos	Pacific	22–18	.550	3rd	Stephen Leonetti	Won Pacific Division semifinals (Santa Cruz) 2–0; Won Pacific Division championship series (Martinez) 2–1
2022	Pecos	Pacific	41–9	.820	1st	Kyle Ulanday	Won Pacific Division semifinals (Santa Rosa) 2–0; Lost Pacific Division championship series (Tucson) 0–2
2023	Pecos	Pacific	39–8	.830	1st	Austin Fitzpatrick	Won Pacific Division semifinals (Lancaster) 2–0; Won Pacific Division championship series (Bakersfield) 2–0; Won Pecos League championship series (Tucson) 2–1
2024	Pecos	Pacific	31–23	.574	2nd	Austin Fitzpatrick	Won Pacific Division semifinals (Marysvile) 2–1; Won Pacific Division championship series (Bakersfield) 2–1; Lost Pecos League championship series (Alpine) 0–2
2025	Pecos	Pacific	38–16	.704	1st	Chris Johnson	Won Pacific Division semifinals (Martinez) 2–0; Won Pacific Division championship series (Dublin) 2–0; Lost Pecos League championship series (Tucson) 1–2
2026	Pecos	Pacific	26–19–2	.574	3rd	Chris Johnson	Pacific Division semifinals (Bakersfield)
Totals			542–339–2	.615	—	—	29–13 (.690)

† 2012, 2013 and 2015 post-season was also included in regular season record.

== Notable alumni ==
- Jailen Peguero (2019)
- J.P. Howell (2018)
- Chris Mazza (2018)
- Jared Koenig (2017–18)
- Eric Byrnes (2014)
- Bill "Spaceman" Lee (2012-2013)
- Tomochika Tsuboi (2012)
