= Martinez Sturgeon =

Professional baseball team in California

- Logo

Information
- League: Pecos League (Pacific Division)
- Location: Martinez, California
- Ballpark: Joe DiMaggio Fields at Waterfront Park
- Founded: 2019
- Nickname: The Fish
- Colors: Royal blue, sky blue and white
- Ownership: Andrew Dunn
- General manager: Eric Halverson
- Manager: Matthew Repplinger
- Website: www.martinezsturgeon.com

The Martinez Sturgeon are a professional baseball team based in Martinez, California. The Sturgeon compete in the Pecos League (PL) as a member of the Pacific Division. The league has no affiliation with Major League Baseball or Minor League Baseball. They play their home games at Joe DiMaggio Fields at Waterfront Park. The baseball field where they currently reside is originally a little league baseball field, and is still used today for such purposes.

== History ==
On December 29, 2019, it was announced that Martinez would be joining the Pecos League for the 2020 season. Despite having drawn interest from the Pacific Association, commissioner and league owner Andrew Dunn moved forward with placing the ball club in the Pacific Division of the Pecos League. On February 10, the club would be announced as the Martinez Sturgeon for the 2020 season. The next day, Dunn revealed the team colors and schedule. The start of the 2020 season was postponed due to the COVID-19 pandemic before all 63 scheduled games ultimately being cancelled.

On May 5, 2021, former Major League Baseball player Ron Witmeyer was named the field manager. The team previously named Pecos League veteran Bill Moore as manager, but had to bow out because of health issues. The Sturgeon finished the 2021 season 23-17, second place in their division. The Sturgeon defeated the Monterey Amberjacks two games to zero in the first round of the bay championship series. The Sturgeon then played in the bay championship series final, in which they lost to the San Rafael Pacifics one games to two.

On February 23, 2022, former Major League Baseball pitcher Manny Corpas was named field manager. Corpas also pitched for the Sturgeon, leading the Pecos league in wins, strikeouts and innings pitched. He finished the season 9-3 with a 4.26 ERA in 114 innings pitched and 147 strikeouts. The team finished with a record of 19-31.

On April 8, 2023, Matthew Repplinger was named field manager. On July 9, the Sturgeon hosted the pacific division All-Star Game. Repplinger led the Sturgeon to a 25-24 record, their first winning season since 2021. Outfielder Nick Adgar hit a franchise record 15 home runs

In the 2024 season, the Sturgeon finished with a record of 20-34, putting them in last place in the division with no playoff berth.

In 2025 the Sturgeon finished the regular season with a 25-30 record. It was good enough for a playoff berth but were eliminated by San Rafael in the first round two games to none in a best of 3 series.

The Sturgeon finished the 2026 regular season with a 26-23-1 record, putting them in fourth place in the Pacific division. They went on to sweep the first place Dublin Leprechauns in the first round of the playoffs. They then advanced to play the San Rafael Pacifics in the second round, Martinez again swept their opponents making them Pacific division champions. The team then traveled to play the Garden City Wind in the league championship series but lost two games to none.

== Season-by-season records ==
Martinez Sturgeon
Season	League	Division	Record	Win %	Finish	Manager	Playoffs
2020	Pecos	Season cancelled (COVID-19 pandemic)					
2021	Pecos	Pacific	23–17	.575	2nd	Ron Witmeyer	Won Pacific Division Semifinals (Monterey) 2-0; Lost Pacific Division Championship (San Rafael) 1-2
2022	Pecos	Pacific	19–31	.380	6th	Manny Corpas	Did not qualify
2023	Pecos	Pacific	25–24	.510	6th	Matthew Repplinger	Did not qualify
2024	Pecos	Pacific	20–34	.370	6th	Matthew Repplinger	Did not qualify
Totals			87–106	.451	—	—	3-2 (.600)

== Roster ==
Martinez Sturgeon roster
Active roster	Coaching staff
Pitchers: 14 Harrison Aiken; 12 Brady Bibbs; 18 Ryan Cormier; 34 Erik Estrada; 35 Richard Garza; 28 Dustin Hernandez; 31 Chris Kenney; 6 Elijah Pacheco-Martinez; 16 Dillon Ponce; 27 Gabriel Rojas; Catchers: 21 Jackson Kea; 10 Dante Peretti; Infielders: 22 Tyler Best; 26 Andrew Curran; 7 Jon Fargnoli; 1 Evan Ford; 25 Caleb Natov; 31 Josue Rivera; 11 Isaiah Clark; Outfielders: 20 Tony Riley; 4 Erik Whitfield	Manager: 37 Matthew Repplinger; Coaches: -- Carlos Bryson (first base); 1 Evan Ford (hitting); Disabled list; ‡ Inactive list; § Suspended list; Roster updated July 28, 2024 Transactions
