= Bakersfield Train Robbers =

Professional baseball team in California

Logo
Cap insignia

Information
- League: Pecos League
- Location: Bakersfield, California
- Ballpark: Sam Lynn Ballpark
- Founded: 2013
- League championships: 2018
- Division championships: 2013, 2018, 2021
- Former name: Topeka Train Robbers (2016); Las Vegas Train Robbers (2013–2015)
- Former ballpark: Lake Shawnee Sports Complex (2016) Rodriguez Park (2013–2014)
- Colors: Blue, red, white, black
- Manager: Bill Rogan
- Website: bakersfieldtrainrobbers.com

The Bakersfield Train Robbers are a professional baseball team based in Bakersfield, California. The team is a member of the Pecos League, an independent baseball league which is not affiliated with Major or Minor League Baseball.

== History ==
Established for the 2013 season, the team played its home games at Rodriguez Park in Las Vegas, New Mexico. On December 19, 2012, Casey Dill was announced as the first manager in club history. After finishing in first place in the North Division with a 41–27 record, the Train Robbers lost in the championship series. On March 11, 2015, the Atlanta Braves signed former Train Robber pitcher Dustin Bare. Bare became the first Train Robber player to sign with an affiliated organization.

In 2016, the club relocated from Las Vegas, New Mexico to Topeka, Kansas where they played at Lake Shawnee Sports Complex. On December 15, 2016, it was announced that the Train Robbers would move to Bakersfield, California for the 2017 season, filling in the void left by the contraction of the California League's Bakersfield Blaze.

In 2018, the Train Robbers' won their second division title and then defeated the Alpine Cowboys to capture their first league championship.

In 2019, former Major League Baseball pitcher Manny Corpas appeared in three games. In 2021, Corpas would return for his second stint with the Train Robbers. Over parts of two seasons, Corpas went 2–0 with a 1.05 ERA in 17 innings pitched while striking out 26 batters.

At the completion of the 2023 Pecos League season the Train Robbers have won three division championships and made three championship game appearances. They currently play their home games at Sam Lynn Ballpark in Bakersfield.

== Roster ==
Bakersfield Train Robbers Roster
Active Roster	Coaching Staff
Pitchers: 6 Hunter Adams; 15 Josiah Bowles; 34 Chris Brown; 17 Cameron Isbell; 36 Kyle Langston; 46 Jayden Metz; 37 Roberto Morales; 22 Jacob Perez; 44 Joe Riddle; 32 Ethan Rivera; 10 Gehrig Taylor; 50 Daxton Tinker; 8 Austin Toerner; 28 Sebastian Vargas; Utility Players: 1 Alex Miller; Catchers: 26 Isaiah Mirabal; 27 Paul Von Zboray; Infielders: 21 Chad Bayne; 16 Paul Carreno; 47 Jalyn Lee; 24 Noah McCreary; 5 Relly Mercurio; 12 Cole Parker; 3 Sebastian Trinidad; Outfielders: 7 Josh Burns; 2 Luke Eskew; 14 Cole Modgling; 9 Ashanti Ross	Manager: 5 Relly Mercurio; Coaches: TBD; Disabled list; ‡ Inactive list; >§ Suspended list; Roster updated July 17, 2024 Transactions

== Professional season-by-season results ==
Season	Overall	Win %	Standing	Manager	Postseason
Las Vegas Train Robbers
2013	41–27	.603	1st of 4 (North)	Casey Dill	Won conference series (TRI) 2–0; Lost championship series (ROS) 0–2
2014	16–42	.276	4th of 4 (North)	DJ Stinsman	Did not qualify
2015	23–41	.359	3rd of 4 (North)	Max Garza	Did not qualify
Topeka Train Robbers
2016	28–33	.459	3rd of 5 (North)	Max Garza (28–29); Bob Fritz (0–4)	Lost first round (TRI) 0–2
Bakersfield Train Robbers
2017	37–25	.597	2nd of 6 (Pacific)	Bill Moore	Lost first round (HIG) 0–2
2018	38–26	.594	1st of 4 (Pacific)	Bryan Kloppe	Won first round (CAL) 2–0; Won conference series (TCA) 2–0; Won championship series (ALP) 2–1
2019	37–26	.587	3rd of 6 (Pacific)	Edilson Alvarez	Won first round (MON) 2–0; Won conference series (HIG) 2–1; Lost championship series (ALP) 0–2
2020	Season canceled due to the COVID-19 pandemic				
2021	33–5	.868	1st of 6 (Pacific)	Relly Mercurio	Lost conference series (TCA) 1–2
2022	31–18	.633	3rd of 8 (Pacific)	Relly Mercurio	Lost first round (TCA) 0–2
2023	29–18	.617	3rd of 8 (Pacific)	Relly Mercurio	Won first round (MON) 2–1; Lost conference series (SRF) 0–2
2024	33–21	.611	1st of 6 (Pacific)	Relly Mercurio	Won first round (VAL) 2–1; Lost conference series (SRF) 1–2
2025	35–19	.648	2nd of 6 (Pacific)	Bill Rogan	Lost first round (DUB) 1–2
Totals	381–301	.559	—	—	19–22 (.463) 1 championship
