= Vallejo Seaweed =

Professional baseball team in California

Information
- League: Pecos League (Pacific Division)
- Location: Vallejo, California
- Ballpark: Wilson Park
- Founded: 2021
- Nickname: The Weed
- Former name: Santa Cruz Seaweed (2021–2022)
- Former ballpark: Harvey West Park
- Colors: Green, lime and black
- Ownership: Andrew Dunn
- Manager: Christian Carmouche
- Website: www.vallejoseaweed.com

The Vallejo Seaweed is a professional baseball team based in Vallejo, California. The Seaweed compete in the Pecos League (PL) as a member of the Pacific Division. The league has no affiliation with Major League Baseball or Minor League Baseball. They play their home games at Wilson Park.

== History ==
=== Santa Cruz Seaweed (2021–2022) ===
In 2021, the Pecos League announced the joining of the Santa Cruz Seaweed in the Pacific Division. The club played its home games at Harvey West Park. Michael Green was announced as the team's first manager. After finishing the season 16–25 and finishing fourth in the Pacific Division, the team played in the Bay Series playoffs where it was eliminated by San Rafael. In 2022, Nic Ray was announced as the club's new manager. After failing to make the playoffs with a 17–33 record, the club announced in October that it would be relocating to Vallejo due to a number of problems, including scheduling conflicts.

=== Vallejo Seaweed (2023–2025) ===
In November 2023, commissioner Andrew Dunn announced Christian Carmouche as the club's manager. The Seaweed were the first team professional baseball team since the Vallejo Admirals of the Pacific Association. After relocating, the Seaweed played their home games at Wilson Park in Vallejo. After struggling to a 12–37 finish in 2023, the Seaweed failed to make the postseason for the second consecutive season. In 2024, the Seaweed finished with a record of 25-29. However, this record was good enough for a postseason berth, where they lost in the divisional round, 1–2 to the Bakersfield Train Robbers. The Vallejo Seaweed were scheduled for a 2025 season in Vallejo, but it fell apart the month before the season started. Despite games already scheduled at Wilson Park, owner Andrew Dunn decided to move the team to Santa Rosa as the Santa Rosa Scuba Divers, citing a lack of communication from the Greater Vallejo Recreation District. Vallejo Seaweed fans were left heartbroken and remain suspicious that Dunn had no real intention of the team staying in Vallejo with games already scheduled in Santa Rosa immediately after the announcement. In June, it was announced the Scuba Divers would leave Santa Rosa and return to Vallejo to play as the Seaweed for the remainder of the season.

== Roster ==
Vallejo Seaweed Roster
Active Roster	Coaching Staff
Pitchers: 40 Dylan Farinacci; 9 David Gustafson; 13 Ike Horn; 31 Kyle Kotecki; 12 Matthew Lazcano; 21 Francisco Leon; 7 Adrian Morales; 15 Zane Morris; 93 George Scandifer; 1 Antonio Straughter; 38 Joel Talbert; 17 Christian Zellner; Catchers: 22 Thomas Fitzpatrick; 91 Tate Jernigan; Infielders: 11 Ike Brown; 57 Christian Carmouche; 35 Aaron Harper; 5 Eddie Molina; 14 Mickey Nunes; 8 Henry Paulino; Outfielders: 92 Carlos Drain; 99 Trey Fletcher; 4 Jamaiz Hunt; 26 Michael Palvecheck; 2 J.T. Reed	Manager: 57 Christian Carmouche; Coaches: TBD; Disabled list; ‡ Inactive list; >§ Suspended list; Roster updated July 28, 2024 Transactions

== Season-by-season records ==
Vallejo Seaweed
Season	League	Division	Record	Win %	Finish	Manager	Playoffs
2021	Pecos	Pacific	16–25	.390	4th	Michael Green	Lost Pacific Division Semifinals (San Rafael) 0-2
2022	Pecos	Pacific	17–33	.340	7th	Nick Ray	Did not qualify
2023	Pecos	Pacific	12–37	.245	7th	Christian Carmouche	Did not qualify
2024	Pecos	Pacific	25–29	.463	4th	Christian Carmouche	Lost Pacific Division Semifinals (Bakersfield) 1-2
Totals			70–124	.361	—	—	1-4 (.200)
