= Kokernot Field =

Baseball stadium in Alpine, Texas

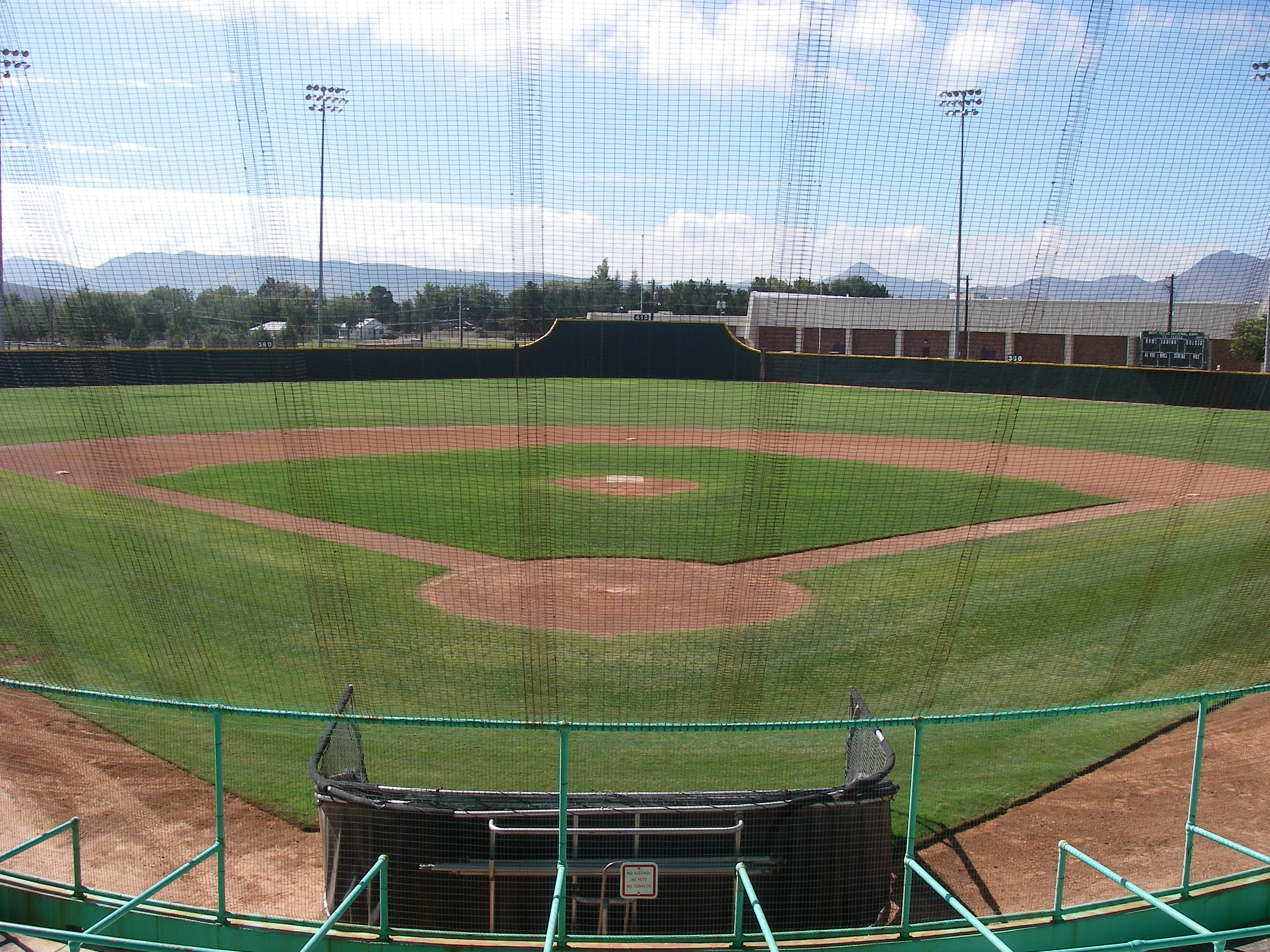
- Interactive map of Kokernot Field
- Location: E Hendryx Dr & Fighting Buck Ave Alpine, Texas 79830
- Coordinates: 30.3730°N 103.6645°W
- Operator: Alpine Independent School District
- Capacity: Baseball: 1,400
- Field size: Left – 330 feet (100 m); Center – 415 feet (126 m); Right – 330 feet (100 m)

Construction
- Opened: 1947
- Cost: $1.25 million

Tenants
- Alpine Cowboys (?) (1947–1958); NAIA World Series (1957–1959); Alpine Cowboys (SL) (1959–1961); Sul Ross State Lobos (NCAA) (19??–1968, 1984–present); Big Bend Cowboys (CBL) (2009–2010); Alpine Cowboys (PL) (2011–present)

Kokernot Field is a baseball stadium in Alpine, Texas, United States. The field has been called "the Best Little Ballpark in Texas (or Anywhere Else)" by Sports Illustrated and the "Yankee Stadium of Texas" by Texas Monthly. An estimated 6,000 attended a 1951 exhibition featuring Satchel Paige's St. Louis Browns versus the Chicago White Sox. Future major leaguers Norm Cash and Gaylord Perry also played on Kokernot Field. The stadium was listed on the National Register of Historic Places in 2026.

The stadium was constructed in 1947 by Big Bend rancher Herbert Lee Kokernot, Jr., for his semiprofessional baseball team. Red clay for the infield was hauled in by boxcar from Georgia. Native stone quarried from the Kokernot Ranch was used to construct the outfield wall and grandstand. The Kokernot Ranch "o6" brand was incorporated into numerous decorations throughout the stadium along with intricate ironwork of baseballs complete with painted threads.

The stadium was built to seat 1,400 people. Lighting was installed in 1958. Ownership of the field was turned over to the Alpine Independent School District in 1968 after Sul Ross State University discontinued their baseball program and semiprofessional play ceased in Alpine after the 1961 season. Sul Ross' baseball program was revived in 1983, and a new independent league professional team was formed in 2009, so the field is currently home to the Sul Ross State University Lobos and the Alpine Cowboys of the Pecos League through lease arrangements.

The Big Bend Cowboys doubleheader on May 17, 2009, was the first professional baseball played at Kokernot Field in 48 years.

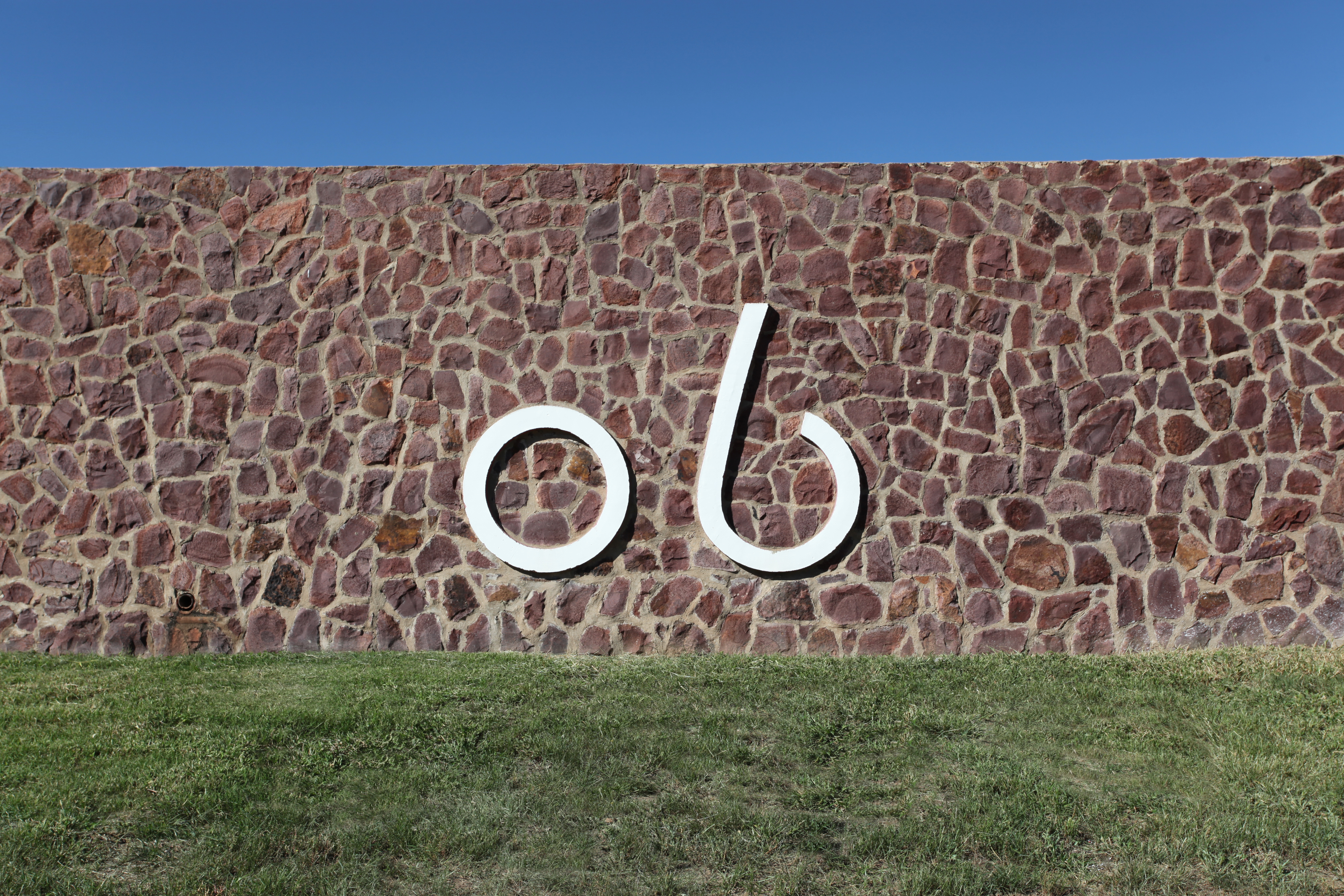
The Kokernot Ranch "o6" brand on a rock wall at Kokernot Field

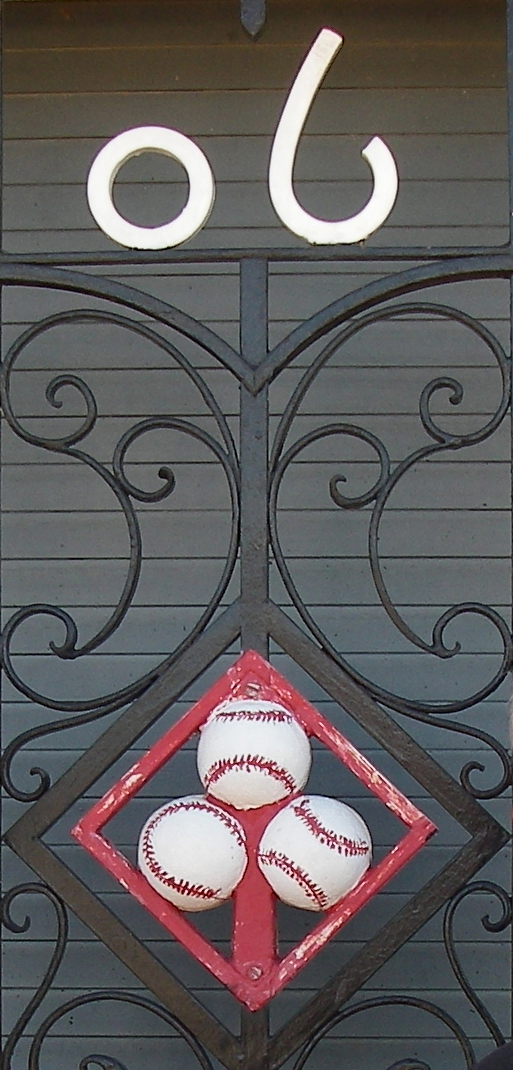
Example of the intricate iron work at Kokernot Field

== See also ==
- Big Bend National Park
- Davis Mountains
- Trans-Pecos
