= Manny Corpas =

Panamanian baseball player (born 1982)

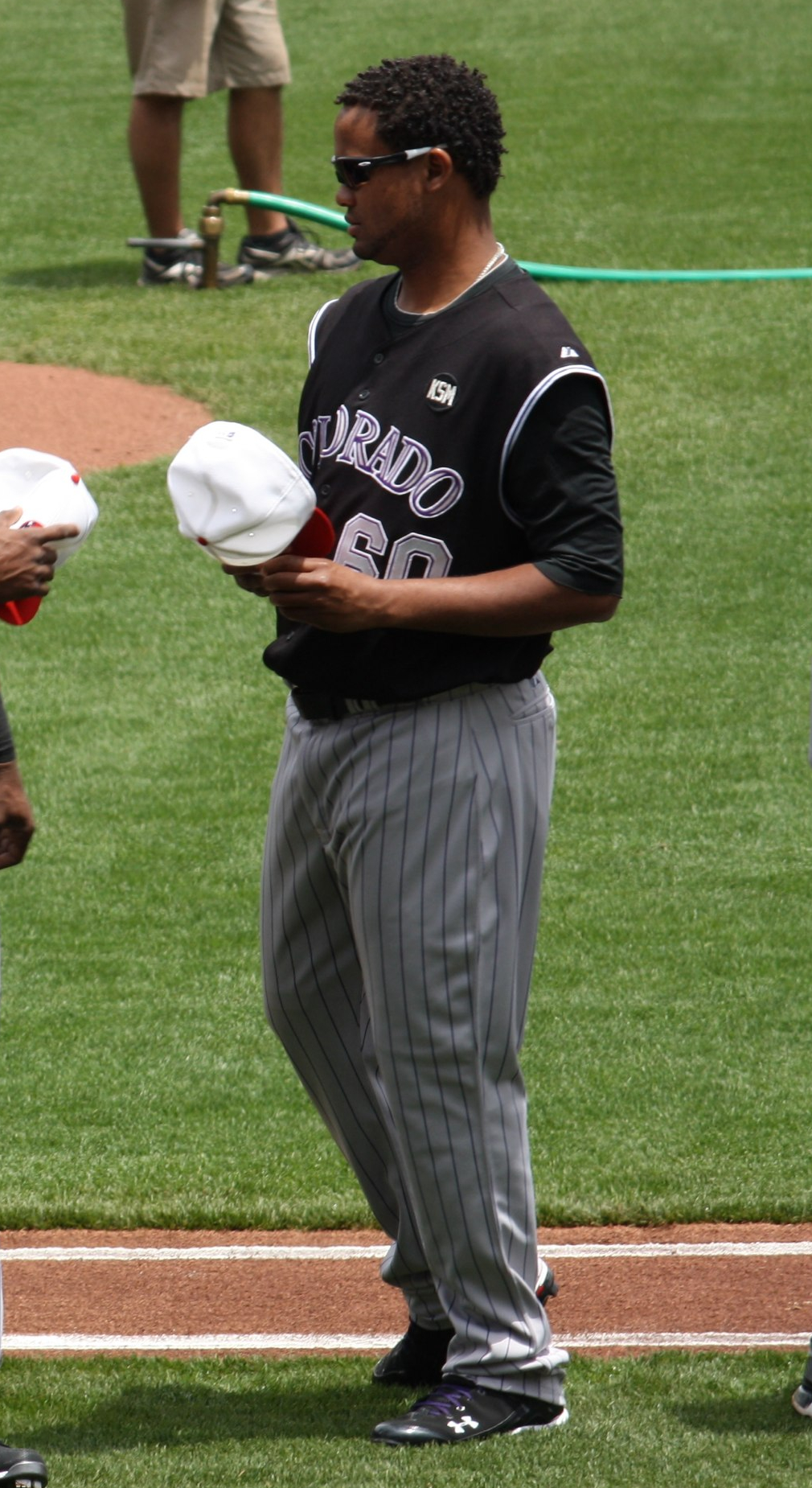
- Corpas with the Colorado Rockies

Monterey Amberjacks
- Field manager
- Born: December 3, 1982 (age 43); Panama City, Panama
- Batted: Right Threw: Right

MLB debut
- July 18, 2006, for the Colorado Rockies

Last MLB appearance
- September 27, 2013, for the Colorado Rockies

MLB statistics
- Win–loss record: 13–20
- Earned run average: 4.14
- Strikeouts: 264
- Saves: 34
- Stats at Baseball Reference

Teams
- Colorado Rockies (2006–2010); Chicago Cubs (2012); Colorado Rockies (2013)

Manuel Corpas (born December 3, 1982) is a Panamanian professional baseball field manager for the Monterey Amberjacks of the Pecos League. He was previously a pitcher in Major League Baseball (MLB) for the Colorado Rockies and Chicago Cubs.

== Career ==
=== Colorado Rockies ===
From the town of Aguas Benditas-Chilibre, Panama, Corpas was signed by the Colorado Rockies at the age of 16 as an amateur free agent in 1999. He made his debut for the Rockies on July 18, 2006. Following the All-Star Break in 2007, Corpas filled in as closer for Brian Fuentes, who was demoted after taking four of eight losses during an 8-game losing skid. Corpas finished the year with a 4–2 win–loss record, a 2.08 earned run average, and 19 saves in 22 chances; he continued to serve as the Rockies' closer during the 2007 postseason.

He continued as the closer into the 2008 season. However, after a number of poor outings, he was replaced by Fuentes in late April. In 2008, he tied for the major league lead in blown saves, with 9.

During 2009 spring training, he competed with Huston Street for the closer spot; Street won the position and Corpas started the season as the eighth inning set up pitcher. After poor performances by Street, Corpas was renamed the closer on April 17; however, Corpas also pitched poorly, and the closer job was given back to Street on May 1. He was released on November 16, 2010.

=== Texas Rangers ===
On May 3, 2011, Corpas signed a minor league contract with the Texas Rangers. He became a free agent following the season on November 2.

=== Chicago Cubs ===
On December 22, 2011, After missing the entire 2011 season due to Tommy John surgery, Corpas signed a one-year deal with the Chicago Cubs.

After being outrighted off of the Cubs' 40-man roster, Corpas elected free agency. Corpas had a 5.01 ERA and 46 2/3 innings in 48 games.

=== Second stint with the Colorado Rockies ===
On January 9, 2013, Corpas signed a minor league contract with the Rockies. His contract was purchased from Colorado Springs (PCL) on June 2, 2013. He was outrighted off the roster and elected free agency October 17, 2013. Corpas rejoined the Rockies for the 2014 season, agreeing to a minor league contract. On July 13, 2014, Corpas was released by the Rockies.

=== Diablos Rojos del México ===
On April 2, 2015, Corpas signed with the Diablos Rojos del México of the Mexican Baseball League. He appeared in 39 games throwing 36 innings going 3–2 with a 3.75 ERA and 23 strikeouts.

=== Guerreros de Oaxaca ===
On July 15, 2015, Corpas was traded to the Guerreros de Oaxaca of the Mexican Baseball League. He was released on February 17, 2016. In 17 games 20.1 innings of relief he went 3–1 with a 3.54 ERA with 13 strikeouts and 4 saves.

=== York Revolution ===
On June 19, 2016, Corpas signed with the York Revolution of the Atlantic League of Professional Baseball. He became a free agent after the 2016 season where he appeared in 34 games 33 innings of relief going 3–1 with a 2.18 ERA with 27 strikeouts. He resigned on May 13, 2017, but was released on June 16 after appearing in 12 games 8.2 innings of relief going 1–0 with a 6.23 ERA and 8 strikeouts.

=== Sugar Land Skeeters ===
That same day he signed with the Sugar Land Skeeters of the Atlantic League of Professional Baseball. He became a free agent after the 2017 season. In 27 games 26.1 innings of relief he went 0–5 with a 5.81 ERA and 22 strikeouts.

=== Algodoneros de Unión Laguna ===
On May 1, 2018, Corpas signed with the Algodoneros de Unión Laguna of the Mexican Baseball League. He became a free agent after the season. In 29 games 30.1 innings of relief he went 3–3 with a 4.75 ERA with 15 strikeouts and 2 saves.

=== Bakersfield Train Robbers ===
Corpas appeared in 1 game of relief throwing 3 innings giving up 4 hits 1 earned run (3.00 ERA) and 5 strikeouts with the Bakersfield Train Robbers of the Pecos League.

=== Milwaukee Milkmen ===
On August 14, 2019, Corpas signed with the Milwaukee Milkmen of the American Association. He was released on January 16, 2020. In 9 games 11.2 innings of relief he went 1–0 with a 4.63 ERA and 7 strikeouts.

On January 12, 2021, Corpas announced his retirement from professional baseball.

=== West Virginia Power ===
On June 26, 2021, Corpas came out of retirement to sign with the West Virginia Power of the Atlantic League of Professional Baseball. Corpas struggled to a 1–2 record and 13.00 ERA in 4 starts with the team before being released on July 19.

=== Bakersfield Train Robbers (second stint) ===
Following his release from the West Virginia Power he signed with the Bakersfield Train Robbers of the Pecos League. He made 2 starts throwing 14 innings going 2–0 with a 0.64 ERA and 21 strikeouts.

=== Martinez Sturgeon ===
On February 23, 2022, Corpas signed with the Martinez Sturgeon of the Pecos League as both a player and their field manager. He finished the season 9–3 with a 4.26 ERA in 114 innings pitched and 147 strikeouts. Corpas was not retained for the 2023 season.

== Coaching career ==
=== Hagerstown Flying Boxcars ===
On February 20, 2024, the Hagerstown Flying Boxcars of the Atlantic League of Professional Baseball announced that Corpas would be the team's pitching coach for the 2024 season.

=== Monterey Amberjacks ===
On February 27, 2025, the Monterey Amberjacks of the Pecos League announced that Corpas would be the team's field manager for the 2025 season.

== International career ==
He was selected Panama national baseball team at the 2006 World Baseball Classic, 2009 World Baseball Classic, 2013 World Baseball Classic Qualification, 2017 World Baseball Classic Qualification and 2019 Pan American Games Qualifier.
