= Dublin Leprechauns =

Professional baseball team in California

Information
- League: Pecos League (Pacific Division)
- Location: Dublin, California
- Ballpark: Fallon Sports Park
- Founded: 2023
- Colors: Kelly green, mint green, gold and black
- Ownership: Andrew Dunn
- General manager: Guy Houston
- Manager: David Aceron
- Website: www.dublinleprechauns.com

The Dublin Leprechauns are an American independent professional baseball team based in Dublin, California. They are a member of the Pacific Division of the Pecos League, an independent baseball league that is not affiliated with Major League Baseball or Minor League Baseball.

== History ==
In May 2023, the Pecos League announced the joining of the Dublin Leprechauns in the Pacific Division. They replaced the Santa Rosa Scuba Divers after the franchise was moved to Dublin from Santa Rosa. Trevor Wick was announced as the team's first manager, but was replaced during spring training by Albert Dominguez. It was speculated that former Major League Baseball World Series champion and Pittsburg Diamonds manager Aaron Miles was going to become manager, but he only assisted in a few games.

After losing their first four games of the 2023 season, the Leprechauns hosted their first regular-season home opener at Fallon Sports Park in Dublin on May 30, defeating the Monterey Amberjacks 6–2. The success was short-lived; the Leprechauns finished at the bottom of the division with a 4–45 record.

In February 2024, the Leprechauns announced David Aceron as manager. They began their second season on May 30, 2024 with an 11–9 win at home against the San Rafael Pacifics, but subsequently lost their regular season home opener against the Pacifics. Although on July 22 they were in 4th place in the division, they ended the 2024 season with a 24–30 record, 5th of 6 teams in the division.

In 2026 the Leprechauns finished the regular season with a record of 30-15-4. Good enough for first place in the Pacific division. They went on the play the Martinez Sturgeon in the first round of the playoffs but lost the series two games to none.

== Roster ==
Dublin Leprechauns roster
| Active roster | Coaching staff |
|---|---|
| Pitchers: 5 Nico Camacho; 79 Jacob Casson; 6 Seth Fane; 14 Makano Fo; 13 Tanner Fonoti; 30 Dante Hatchett; 36 Kaden McDowell; 4 Brad Morano; 25 Joey Mucilli; 20 Matt Sartwell; 35 Jonathan Williams; Catchers: 10 Cade Bochtler; 15 Chase Evans; 56 Donnie Gardiner; Infielders: 27 Nick Antoni; 15 Daniel Arroyo; 81 Victor Ceniceros; 1 Nick Ciszak; 7 Jalen Ford; 3 Thomas Latham; 2 Stone Miyao; 16 Fuma Ogami; 6 Angus Stayte; Outfielders: 8 Teddy Bridges; 2 Billy Brown; 99 Diante Jackson; 98 Joseph Nunn; 23 Phillip Parker; 24 Mike Sonn | Manager: 18 David Aceron; Coaches: Disabled list; ‡ Inactive list; § Suspended list; Roster updated June 20, 2024 Transactions |

== Season-by-season results ==
Dublin Leprechauns
| Year | Regular Season | | | | Postseason | | |
| Year | Record | Win % | Finish | Manager | Record | Win % | Result |
|---|---|---|---|---|---|---|---|
| 2023 | 4–45 | .082 | 8th of 8 (Pacific) | Trevor Wick, Aaron Miles, Albert Dominguez | – | – | – |
| 2024 | 24–30 | .444 | 5th of 6 (Pacific) | Dave Aceron | - | - | - |
| 2025 | 33–20–1 | .620 | 3rd of 6 (Pacific) | Dave Aceron | 2–2 | .500 | - |
| Totals | 61–95–1 | .392 | - | - | 2–2 | .500 | |
