= Wasco Reserve =

Minor-league baseball team in Bakersfield, California

- Logo

Information
- League: Pecos League
- Location: Bakersfield, California
- Ballpark: Sam Lynn Ballpark
- Founded: 2018
- Disbanded: 2022
- Former ballpark: Wasco Ballpark
- Colors: Maroon, powder blue, white
- Ownership: Pecos League
- Website: wascoreserve.com

The Wasco Reserve were a professional baseball team based in Bakersfield, California, which began play in 2019. The team was a member of the Pecos League, an independent baseball league which is not affiliated with Major League Baseball or Minor League Baseball.

The team began play in 2019 in Wasco, California. For the 2022 season, the team moved all home games to Sam Lynn Ballpark in Bakersfield, which they share with fellow Pecos League team the Bakersfield Train Robbers. After the 2022 season, the team folded.

== Season By Season Record ==
Year	W	L	GB
2019	19	43	26
2021	10	29	39
2022	7	40	34
