= Blackwell FlyCatchers =

Professional baseball team in Oklahoma

- Logo

Information
- League: Pecos League (Mountain North Division)
- Location: Blackwell, Oklahoma
- Ballpark: Morgan Field
- Founded: 2023
- Colors: Dun brown, brown, tan and white
- Ownership: Andrew Dunn
- Manager: Luke Poselovic
- Website: www.blackwellflycatchers.com

The Blackwell FlyCatchers are a professional baseball team based in Blackwell, Oklahoma. They are a member of the Mountain North Division of the Pecos League, an independent baseball league which is not affiliated with Major League Baseball or Minor League Baseball. They play their home games at Morgan Field.

== History ==
=== 2023–present: Pecos League ===
On August 18, 2022, the Pecos League announced the joining of the Blackwell FlyCatchers in the Mountain Division for the 2023 Pecos League season. Their home games are played at Morgan Field. On June 1, 2023, the club played and won their first game in franchise history against the Garden City Wind 9–2. Blackwell finished their first season 17–25 with Luke Poselovic acting as manager.

In 2024, Poselovic returned as manager. On June 25, 2024, pitcher Eli Davis set the Pecos League single-game strikeout record with 21 strikeouts against the Sante Fe Fuego. Davis threw eight innings of shutout baseball while allowing three walks and four hits over 142 pitches thrown.

== Roster ==
Blackwell FlyCatchers Roster
Active Roster	Coaching Staff
Pitchers: 48 Matt Bataska; 21 Cade Caldwell; 11 Marty Carnahan; 51 Eli Davis; 7 Ismael De Los Santos; 38 Chris Echavarria; 36 Jadon Harper; 26 Matthew Hickey; 25 Alex Jacobs; 46 Cade Johnson; 38 Kaden Kneip; 10 Braeden Levandowski; 15 Owen Little; 8 DJ Martin; 12 Brendan Moran; 14 Joey Muccilli; 20 Matt Rones; Catchers: 3 Cam Pfafman; Infielders: 2 Markus Bracey; 29 Damon Burroughs; 5 Joey Dice; 28 Daniel Martinez; 4 Nico Ojeda; Outfielders: 50 Ty Andrews; 39 Rey Lozano; 34 Dominic Pisano; 17 Jack Skantze	Manager: -- Luke Poselovic; Coaches: TBD; Disabled list; ‡ Inactive list; >§ Suspended list; Roster updated July 28, 2024 Transactions

== Season-by-season records ==
Blackwell FlyCatchers
Season	League	Division	Record	Win %	Finish	Manager	Playoffs
2023	Pecos	Mountain	17–25	.405	6th	Luke Poselovic	Did not qualify
2024	Pecos	Mountain North	27–22	.551	3rd	Luke Poselovic	Lost Mountain Division Quarterfinals (Trinidad) 0-2
Totals			44–47	.484	—	—	0-2 (.000)
