= Alpine Cowboys =

Baseball team in Alpine, Texas, United States

- Logo

Information
- League: Pecos League (2011–present)
- Location: Alpine, Texas
- Ballpark: Kokernot Field
- Founded: 1946
- League championships: 1959; 2010; 2012; 2019; 2024
- Division championships: 2015; 2018; 2024
- Former name: Big Bend Cowboys (2009–10)
- Former leagues: Continental Baseball League (2009–10); Sophomore League (1959–61)
- Colors: Red, white (red, green and white from 2009–10)
- Retired numbers: Jared Strait (57)
- Ownership: Big Bend Community Baseball and Softball Inc. (nonprofit)
- President: Bob Ward
- General manager: Kristin Cavness
- Manager: Lance Myers
- Media: KVLF 1240AM/98.7FM
- Website: alpine.pecosleague.com

The Alpine Cowboys are a professional baseball team based in Alpine, Texas, in the Big Bend region of West Texas. The Cowboys are a franchise of the Pecos League, which is not affiliated with a Major League Baseball organization. They play their home games at Kokernot Field, a 1,200-seat stone and wrought-iron replica of Chicago's Wrigley Field that dates from 1948.

== History ==
=== Early years (1946–1958) ===
In 1946, Herbert L. Kokernot Jr., son of Texas cattle rancher and entrepreneur Herbert L. Kokernot, retooled the semiprofessional baseball team the Alpine Cats into the Alpine Cowboys. While semiprofessional teams were not uncommon in Texas at the time, the Alpine Cowboys had the unusual benefit of a brand new stadium, Kokernot Field, opened for them in 1947. Constructed at a cost of $1.5 million, the elaborately decorated stadium included imported infield clay shipped by train from Georgia. The Cowboys used the stadium as its home field from 1947 through 1958, during which they took a dozen titles in the regional and were runners-up for a national championship. At the end of championship seasons, Kokernot presented each team member with a pair of handmade red cowboy boots emblazoned with the brand of his "o6" Ranch—a tradition that continues with the current Cowboys' cap insignia. In addition to supporting the team and the region with a state-of-the-art stadium, Kokernot also actively supported athletes in Alpine and elsewhere, bringing promising high-school graduates onto the roster of the team and offering college scholarships to players throughout the southwest. The team featured future major league stars, including Norm Cash, Gaylord Perry, and Joe Horlen. In the days of segregation in Texas, Kokernot arranged for many exhibition games between traveling Negro league teams—led by such stars as Satchel Paige—and visiting Mexican League teams. Those exhibitions drew fans from hundreds of miles away.

In a 2007 article, the Fort Worth Star-Telegram described the team as "one of the state's finest semiprofessional teams". The team launched a number of baseball professionals, including two Hall of Fame inductees. Among them was coach Tom Chandler.

=== Minor league baseball (1959–1961) ===
==== Boston Red Sox affiliate ====
In 1959, the Boston Red Sox moved their minor league affiliate, the Lexington Red Sox of the Nebraska State League, to Alpine, and took the traditional name "Cowboys" for the team. The new Cowboys immediately won the Class D Sophomore League title and set the record for the highest winning percentage 88–34 (.721) of any Red Sox minor league team. The 1959 championship team was managed by future Red Sox manager Eddie Popowski and featured three future major leaguers, pitcher Don Schwall, who two years later won the American League Rookie of the Year Awards; second baseman Chuck Schilling, who finished fourth behind Schwall in the same balloting; and pitcher Guido Grilli. The 1960 team featured future California Angels all-star Jim Fregosi. In 1962, the Sophomore League folded and the team moved to Idaho, becoming the Pocatello Chiefs of the Class C Pioneer League.

=== Independent leagues (2009–present) ===
==== Continental Baseball League (2009–2010) ====
Professional baseball returned to Alpine in 2009 with the Big Bend Cowboys of the Continental Baseball League. The team was founded by Frank Snyder, a Fort Worth law professor, who had previously founded the CBL's Texarkana Gunslingers and who brought several local investors from the Alpine area into the new team.

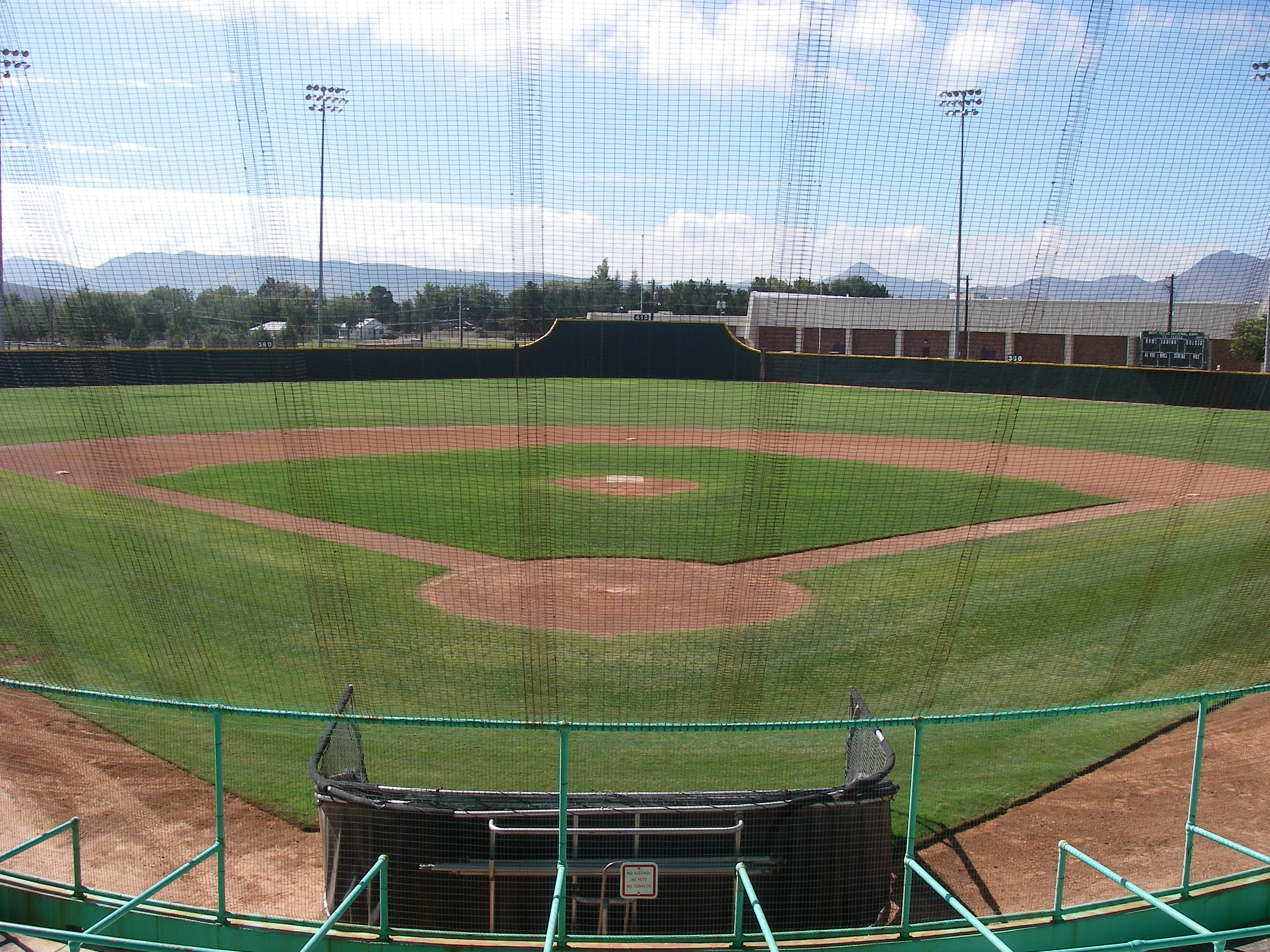
Kokernot Field, Alpine, Texas (2008)

In 2009, the Cowboys finished fourth with a 37–23 record. The Cowboys then defeated Bay Area in the semifinals, earning them a berth in the championship. They were then defeated by Alexandria two games to none. In 2010, the final year of the CBL, the Cowboys went 33–15 in the regular season. They then defeated Las Cruces in the championship, earning them their first Ferguson Jenkins trophy.

==== Pecos League (2011–present) ====
After the 2010 season, Alpine reorganized as a nonprofit corporation and became charter members of the Pecos League alongside Las Cruces. In 2011, the Cowboys retired "Big Bend" and returned to the Alpine Cowboys name.

In 2012, the Cowboys won their first Pecos League championship, defeating Roswell.

In 2019, the club captured their second Pecos League championship, defeating Bakersfield in the finals.

On June 9, 2023, pitcher Jared Strait died in a car crash outside of Eldorado, Texas while on a road trip to play Austin. The team retired his number, 57.

In 2024, Alpine held a league best 45–4 record. The team set the Pecos League record with a .918 winning percentage. On August 5, 2024, infielder James Prockish became the all time Pecos League hits leaders.

== Roster ==
Alpine Cowboys roster
Active roster	Coaching staff
Pitchers: 21 Matteo Avallone; 19 Michael Castillo; 17 Aldo Buendia; 42 Jesse Garcia; 18 Ryan Greco; 33 Matt Hass; 65 Shane Hykin; 40 Brendan May; 69 Cameron Mulvihill; 30 Spencer Persky; 57 Jared Strait; 7 Brayde Hirai; 61 Connor Kelly; 12 Dom Spinoso; 20 Bryson Spagnuolo; 6 Camrin Wleczyk; Catchers: 11 Kam Holland; 23 Jake Sisto; Infielders: 22 Alex Canty; 10 Jeff Disla; 4 Manny Garcia; 27 James Prockish; Outfielders: 1 Drake Angeron; 24 Drew Bayard; 3 Cade Biddle; 2 Mitch Piatnik; 15 Andrew Capone; 36 Mark Traylor	Manager: 8 Sean Persky; Coaches: 45 Alejandro Amezquita; 5 Lance Myers; Disabled list; ‡ Inactive list; § Suspended list; Roster updated December 16, 2023 Transactions

== Affiliated season-by-season records ==
Alpine Cowboys
Season	League	Division	Record	Win %	Finish	Manager	Playoffs	MLB affiliate	Class
1959	SOPH	South	88–34	.721	1st	Eddie Popowski	Won Semifinals (Hobbs) 2–0; Won Finals (Carlsbad) 2–0	Boston Red Sox	D
1960	SOPH	–	76–52	.594	1st	Dick Kinaman	Won First Half; Lost Finals (Hobbs) 1–2	Boston Red Sox	D
1961	SOPH	–	62–63	.292	4th	Mel Parnell	Did not qualify	Boston Red Sox	D
Totals			226–149	.603	—	—	5–2 (.714)	—	—

== Independent season-by-season records ==
Alpine Cowboys
Season	League	Division	Record	Win %	Finish	Manager	Playoffs
2009	CNTL	–	37–23	.617	4th	Donnie Randell	Won Semifinals (Bay Area) 2–1; Lost Finals (Alexandria) 0–2
2010	CNTL	–	33–15	.688	1st	Donnie Randell	Won Finals (Las Cruces) 2–1
2011	Pecos	–	36–30	.545	4th	Ryan Stevens	Lost Semifinals (Roswell) 1–2
2012	Pecos	–	45–24	.652	1st	Ryan Stevens	Won Semifinals (Trinidad) 2–0; Won Finals (Las Cruces) 2–1
2013	Pecos	South	43–26	.623	2nd	Ryan Stevens	Lost South Finals (Roswell) 0–2
2014	Pecos	South	48–20	.706	1st	Ryan Stevens	Won South Finals (Roswell) 2–1; Lost League Finals (Santa Fe) 1–2
2015	Pecos	South	43–26	.623	1st	Brett Kennedy	Lost South Finals (Roswell) 2–3
2016	Pecos	South	32–32	.500	3rd	Thomas Nelson	Lost South Semifinals (Roswell) 0–2
2017	Pecos	Mountain	43–18	.705	1st	Austin Prott	Lost Mountain Division Championship (Roswell) 1–2
2018	Pecos	Mountain	48–15	.762	1st	Austin Prott	Won Mountain Division Championship (Trinidad) 2–0; Lost Pecos League championship (Bakersfield) 1–2
2019	Pecos	Mountain	41–16	.719	1st	Sean Persky	Won Mountain Division Semifinals (Roswell) 2–0; Won Pecos League championship (Bakersfield) 2–0
2020	Pecos	Season cancelled (COVID-19 pandemic)					
2021	Pecos	Mountain South	31–25	.554	2nd	Sean Persky	Lost Mountain Division Quarterfinals (Roswell) 1–2
2022	Pecos	Mountain South	32–17	.653	1st	Sean Persky	Lost First Round (Trinidad) 1–2
2023	Pecos	Mountain	36–16	.692	2nd	Sean Persky	Lost First Round (Trinidad) 1–2
2024	Pecos	Mountain South	45–4	.918	1st	Sean Persky	Won Mountain Division Semifinals (Tucson) 2–1; Won Mountain Division Finals (Garden City) 2–0 Won Pecos League Championship (San Rafael) 2–0
Totals			593–307	.659	—	—	31–28 (.525)

== Notable alumni ==
- Jon Edwards (2011)
