= Garden City Wind =

Baseball Team

- Logo

Information
- League: Pecos League (2015–present) (Mountain)
- Location: Garden City, Kansas
- Ballpark: Clint Lightner Field
- Founded: 2015
- League championships: 2026
- Division championships: 2022
- Colors: Blue, powder blue, light gray
- General manager: Randy Ralston
- Website: gardencitywind.com

The Garden City Wind are a professional baseball team based in Garden City, Kansas, in southwest Kansas. The Wind are a franchise of the Pecos League, which is not affiliated with a Major League Baseball organization. They play their home games at Clint Lightner Field, a 1,500-seat facility that dates to 1936.

== History ==
The Garden City Wind were established for the 2015 season, as the Pecos League, which at the time was established in Colorado, New Mexico, and West Texas, becoming the first Kansas-based franchise in the league's history.

After struggling to a 21–43 record in their inaugural season, the Wind responded with their first winning season in 2016, going 38-26 and reaching the postseason, dropping a hard-fought best-of-three series 2–1 to the Trinidad Triggers in the North Division championship.

Hard times came the two subsequent seasons as the Wind staggered to a last-place, 18–43 mark in 2017, followed by a woeful 11-50 campaign in 2018, worst in the league.

2019, though, saw another major turnaround as the Wind finished second in the Mountain division with a franchise-best 42–20 mark, though they were bounced by Roswell in two straight games in the first round.

The Wind sat out the 2020 season as the Pecos League elected to play a 36-game season in Houston, Texas with four teams. Garden City did not participate due to the COVID-19 pandemic.

Returning in 2021, the Wind finished second in the Mountain North division with a 33–22 record and won a playoff series for the first time in franchise history by defeating the Colorado Springs Snow Sox 2–1 in a best-of-three series, though once more, the Wind were denied by Roswell in another 2–1 series as Roswell advanced to the Pecos League finals.

The winning ways continued in 2022 as the Wind won their first-ever division title, taking the Mountain Division crown with a 36–10 mark. The season also saw the Wind host the Mountain Division All-Star Game for the first time on July 10, 2022. However, the season once again ended at the hands of Roswell, who dispatched Garden City in the first round of the playoffs. Despite the heartbreak, the Wind did set unofficial Pecos League records for single-season and per-game attendance, drawing nearly 25,000 fans to 37 home games.

For the third consecutive year, the Wind were playoff-bound in 2023, going 30-20 and snagging the fourth and final playoff spot, edging out longtime nemesis Roswell. However, eventual Mountain Division champion Tucson Saguaros took out the Wind in two straight games to eliminate Garden City.

Following the 2023 season, manager Garrett Totty, who had been with the club since 2021, left Garden City to manage the Roswell Invaders. Totty went 99–52 in three seasons with the Wind, reaching the playoffs in all three campaigns and departing as the club's all-time winningest skipper.

== Season-by-season records ==
Garden City Wind
Season	League	Division	Record	Win %	Finish	Manager	Playoffs
2015	Pecos	North	21–43	.328	4th	Mike Reeves	Did not qualify
2016	Pecos	North	38–26	.594	1st	Bill Moore	Lost North Division finals (Trinidad) 1–2
2017	Pecos	Mountain	20–43	.317	5th	David Peterson	Did not qualify
2018	Pecos	Mountain	11–51	.177	4th	Ian Horne (2–13) (Note: Horne managed Garden City until he left to join the Salina Stockade, who were guests of the Can-Am League as a player 6/8/18. Cherniwchan managed Garden City the rest of the season.); Nolan Cherniwchan (9–38)	Did not qualify
2019	Pecos	Mountain	42–20	.677	2nd	David Peterson	Lost Mountain Division Semifinals (Roswell) 0–2
2020	Pecos	Season cancelled (COVID-19 pandemic)					
2021	Pecos	Mountain North	33–22	.600	2nd	Garrett Totty	Won Mountain Division Semifinals (Colorado Springs) 2–1; Lost Mountain Division Finals (Roswell) 1–2
2022	Pecos	Mountain	36–10	.783	1st	Garrett Totty	Lost Mountain Division Semifinals (Roswell) 1–2
2023	Pecos	Mountain	30–20	.600	4th	Garrett Totty	Lost Mountain Division Semifinals (Tucson) 0–2
2024	Pecos	Mountain North	42–9	.824	1st	Easton Barnes	Won Mountain Division Semifinals (Trinidad) 2–0; Lost Mountain Division Finals (Alpine) 0-2
Totals			273–244	.528	—	—	7–11 (.389)
