= Colorado Springs Snow Sox =

Professional baseball team based in Colorado Springs, Colorado

- Logo

Information
- League: Pecos League
- Location: Colorado Springs, Colorado
- Ballpark: Spurgeon Stadium
- Founded: 2021
- Disbanded: 2022
- Colors: Red, white, navy blue
- Website: coloradospringssnowsox.com

The Colorado Springs Snow Sox were a professional baseball team based in Colorado Springs, Colorado. The team was a member of the Pecos League, an independent baseball league which is not affiliated with Major or Minor League Baseball.

== History ==
On January 12, 2021, it was announced that Snow Sox would join the Pecos League for the 2021 season.

Before the 2023 Season, The Snow Snox were removed from the Pecos League for unknown reasons.
