= Tucson Saguaros =

Professional baseball team

- Logo

Information
- League: Pecos League (Mountain South)
- Location: Tucson, Arizona
- Ballpark: Kino Veterans Memorial Stadium
- Founded: 2015
- League championships: 2016, 2020, 2021, 2025
- Former ballparks: Kino Veterans Memorial Stadium (2016–2017, 2022–present); Amphitheater High School (2021); Cherry Field (2018–2019); Gene C. Reid Park Field #5 (2018); Warren Ballpark (2016–2017)
- Colors: Green, black, gold
- Ownership: Andrew Dunn
- Manager: Sean McNeill
- Website: www.saguarosbaseball.com

The Tucson Saguaros are a professional baseball team based in Tucson, Arizona, that began play in 2016. The club is a member of the Pecos League, an independent baseball league which is not affiliated with Major League Baseball or Minor League Baseball.

== History ==
Kino Veterans Memorial Stadium, Tucson, Arizona (2016)

Announced in November 2015 as an expansion franchise, Tucson began play in the 2016 season. The team played its home games Thursday through Sunday at Cherry Field. The team played neutral site home games Monday through Wednesday in Winslow at Vargas Field.

The team's home field was Kino Veterans Memorial Stadium for the 2016 and 2017 seasons with the exception of Sunday games, which were played at Warren Ballpark in Bisbee. The Saguaros moved to Reid Park Field #5 at the beginning of the 2018 season for Thursday through Sunday games, but then moved to Cherry Field on July 4, 2018.

The team conducted Spring Training at Pascua Yaqui Pueblo Park on the Pascua Pueblo Yaqui Reservation. Spring Training was also conducted at Reid Park Field #5 starting in 2018, where they were joined by the Ruidoso Osos. They are known colloquially as the "Cactus Crew".

=== 2016: Inaugural season and a Pecos League championship ===
The team began signing players for its first season in winter preparing for opening of its training camp in May.

The Saguaros opened their inaugural season 6–0, sweeping the Santa Fe Fuego in a four-game series. In a high-scoring 22–12 victory on May 25, 2016, against the White Sands Pupfish in Alamogordo, New Mexico, the Saguaros had 29 hits and four home runs, one of which was hit by the starting pitcher, Carlos Diaz.

On July 4, 2016, the Saguaros broke the all-time Pecos League record by drawing 8,720 fans to their contest against Roswell, an 8–4 Invaders win.

On August 11, 2016, the Saguaros became the 2016 Pecos League champions by defeating the Trinidad Triggers 2 games to 0 in a 5–4 victory. Entering the bottom of the ninth inning, the Trinidad Triggers were leading 4–1. Catcher Jesse Baker scored the winning run in the bottom of the ninth when Christian Schneider threw a wild pitch to pinch hitter Thomas McKenna. The Saguaros set a Pecos League record with 51 wins in a season.

=== 2017: Best record in Pecos League ===
Kirby Campbell was announced as the new manager on October 12, 2016, while the previous manager, J.D. Droddy, remained on the Saguaros as the Director of Player Procurement until becoming the manager of the Salina Stockade (baseball) of the American Association of Independent Professional Baseball. Campbell, a 2014 graduate of the University of Arkansas at Pine Bluff, began the 2016 season as the starting first baseman of the Great Bend Boom and became Great Bend's manager midway through the season. Five players returned from the inaugural season: pitchers Brandon Cook, Jake Eaton, and Matt Kelley, as well as outfielders Burnell Dailey, and Thomas McKenna. The Saguaros finished the season with the best record in the Pecos League, 46–11, but they lost in the playoffs to the High Desert Yardbirds 2–1 in the Pacific Division series.

=== 2018: Move to Reid Park and Cherry Field ===
The Saguaros moved from the Pacific Division to the Southern Division in 2018. The team also moved their home field to Gene C. Reid Park Field #5. Bill Moore, a resident of Mesa was announced as the new manager on December 16, 2017. He had originally considered taking the job in 2016. Ryan Retz, a Canyon del Oro High School graduate and Pecos League All-Star in 2016 for the Saguaros, returned after a one-year hiatus from the team. Left-handed pitcher Ryan Baca and infielder Kevin Baron returned from the previous year. The Saguaros played a Spring Training game against the Ruidoso Osos at Reid Park Field #5 on May 20, 2018. It was the first time the team had played a Spring Training game against another team. On July 4, 2018, the Saguaros moved to Cherry Field since it had lights so that home games could be played at night and start later at 7:00 P.M.

=== 2019: Full season at Cherry Field ===
The Saguaros moved back to the Pacific Division in 2019. On December 8, 2018, Bill Rogan, from Denver was named the new manager. He worked for the Colorado Rockies Specialty Ticket Sales. 2018 Pecos League All-Star outfielder Lawrence Chavez was the only returning player from the previous year.

=== 2020: Delayed season in Houston and Second Pecos League championship ===
Due to the COVID-19 pandemic, the season was delayed to start on July 1, 2020, with all games to be played at Coastal Park in Houston, Texas. The Saguaros moved to the Central Division. On August 25, 2020, the Saguaros became the 2020 Pecos League champions by defeating the Salina Stockade 2 games to 0.

=== 2021: Amphitheater High School and Third Pecos League championship ===
The Saguaros moved to the Mountain South Division in 2021 and played home games at Amphitheater High School, winning their third Pecos League championship.

=== 2022: Return to Kino Stadium ===
After playing home games at smaller stadiums for the previous few years, the Saguaros returned to Kino Veterans Memorial Stadium. They returned to the Pacific Division this year.

=== 2023: Fifth Pecos League Championship Series ===
The Saguaros moved back to the Mountain Division this year, and played in their fifth championship series.

=== 2024-Present: Rebound and a Fourth Championship ===
After losing in 2023, The Saguaros would go on to finish 27-18, their lowest win total since the 2020 season. In the Postseason due to Kino Veterans Memorial Stadium being booked for other events, the Saguaros would be forced to play on the road for the first round of the playoffs where they beat the Roswell Invaders two games to zero. In the next round they traveled to Alpine where the Saguaros would find themselves one strike away from advancing in game 3, however Alpine would survive and win, ending Tucson's season.

2025 would be different as the Saguaros would only lose 9 games all year on their way to a Mountain South Title, and the second best winning percentage in the Pecos League that season. In the Playoffs they would swept the Pecos Bills to claim the Mountain South Postseason title, and also sweep the Garden City Wind on the road to win the Mountain Division Title and advance to their sixth Pecos League Championship Series. In a rematch of the 2023 Championship series, the Saguaros would lose the first game, but would rebound in the next two games to clinch the franchise's fourth Pecos League title.

== Roster ==
Tucson Saguaros Roster
Active Roster	Coaching Staff
Pitchers: 6 Jaymon Cervantes; 9 Nate Naccarato; 11 Carson McKenna; 15 Derek Cabrera; 19 Jesse Palafox; 22 Travis Cole; 26 Sean Mean; 30 Mason Longoria; 31 Kevin Worek; 36 Sam Thomb; 48 Blake Garrett; 50 Treshon Paschal; 57 Ian Lanik; Catchers: 7 Cedric Reynaud; 16 Hal Perez; 25 Brian Ledezma; Infielders: 8 Jacob Elizondo; 17 Yan Rivera; 18 Antonio Fernandez; 35 Hayden Leopold; 44 Gavy Perez-Torres; Outfielders: 13 Marquise Wood; 20 Mike Whalen; 24 Logan Meyer; 36 Anthony Manisero	Manager: 33 Sean McNeill; Coaches: 19 Jesse Palafox; 44 Gavy Perez-Torres; Disabled list; ‡ Inactive list; >§ Suspended list; Roster updated August 17, 2025 Transactions

== Season-by-season results ==
Season	W	L	Win%	Result	Playoffs
2016	51	14	.785	1st of 5 South Division	Division Semi: 1st Round Bye Division Championship: defeated Roswell Invaders 2-1; League Championship: defeated Trinidad Triggers 2–0
2017	46	14	.766	1st of 6 Pacific Division	Division Semi: 1st Round Bye Division Championship: lost High Desert Yardbirds 1–2
2018	41	18	.695	1st of 4 Southern Division	Division Semi: 1st Round Bye Division Championship: lost Bakersfield Train Robbers 0–2
2019	30	30	.500	4th of 6 Pacific Division	DNQ
2020	26	4	.866	1st of 4 Central Division	Division Championship: 1st Round Bye League Championship: defeated Salina Stockade 2–0
2021	32	23	.581	1st of 5 Mountain South Division	Division Semi: 1st Round Bye Division Championship: defeated Bakersfield Train Robbers 2–1; League Championship: defeated Roswell Invaders 2–1
2022	34	8	.809	1st of 4 Pacific South Division	Division Semi: defeated Bakersfield Train Robbers 2–0 Division Championship: defeated San Rafael Pacifics 2–0; League Championship: lost Roswell Invaders 1–2
2023	32	13	.711	1st of 8 Mountain Division	Division Semi: defeated Garden City Wind 2–0 Division Championship: defeated Trinidad Triggers 2–0; League Championship: lost San Rafael Pacifics 1–2
2024	27	18	.600	2nd of 5 Mountain South Division	Wild Card: defeated Roswell Invaders 2-0 Division: lost Alpine Cowboys 1–2
2025	43	9	.821	1st of 5 Mountain South Division	Wild Card: 1st Round Bye Division Semi: defeated Pecos Bills 2–0; Divisional Championship: defeated Garden City Wind 2–0; League Championship: defeated San Rafael Pacifics 2–1
Totals	362	149	.708	-	30-14 (.682)

== Team firsts ==
First Game: vs Santa Fe Fuego, 11–4 win (5/19/2016)
First Hit: Burnell Dailey, (5/19/2016)
First Home Run: Adam Urbania, (5/19/2016)
First Winning Pitcher: David Contreras (5/19/2016)
First Save: Daniel Hurtado (5/21/2016)

== Individual awards ==
=== Pecos League MVP ===
- 2020 – Nathan Etheridge

=== Pecos League Pitcher of the Year ===
- 2016 – Steven Borkowski
- 2020 – Cody Earl

=== Pecos League Pacific Division Pitcher of the Year ===
- 2017 – Clay Miller

=== Pecos League Southern Division Pitcher of the Year ===
- 2018 – Skylar Sylvester

=== Pecos League Mountain Division Pitcher of the Year ===
- 2021 – Auggie Martinez
- 2023 – Jaymon Cervantes

=== Pecos League Pacific Division Hitter of the Year ===
- 2017 – Fernando Garza
- 2022 – Brock Ephan

=== Pecos League Southern Division Hitter of the Year ===
- 2018 – Austin Hoffman

=== Pecos League Offensive Player of the Year ===
- 2020 – Chris Caffrey

=== Pecos League Mountain Division Offensive Player of the Year ===
- 2021 – Gabe Wurtz

=== Pecos League Mountain Division Manager of the Year ===
- 2021 – Sean McNeill

=== Pecos League All-Star ===
- Adam Urbania (2016)
- David Robles (2016)
- Jesse Baker (2016)
- Michael Morris (2016)
- Ryan Retz (2016)
- Steven Borkowski (2016)
- Brandon Cook (2017)
- Clay Miller (2017)
- Darryl Baca (2017)
- Eric Morell (2017)
- Fernando Garza (2017)
- Frank Trimarco (2017)
- Kevin Baron (2017, 2018)
- Matt Kelley (2017)
- Nicholas Vitale (2017)
- Thomas McKenna (2017)
- Tre Porter (2017)
- Zack Gonzalez (2017)
- Austin Hoffman (2018)
- Billy Damon (2018)
- Charlie Padilla (2018)
- Jaquese Moore (2018)
- Kevin Carr (2018)
- Lawrence Chavez (2018, 2019)
- Skylar Sylvester (2018)
- Tatum Hendrix (2018)
- Willie Ethington (2018)
- Evan Douglas (2019)
- Joe Rivera (2019)
- Michael Klein (2019)
- Patrick Clifford (2019)
- Riley Richarz (2019)
- Robby Medel (2019)
- Will Morris (2019)
- Augie Martinez (2021)
- Christian Naccari (2021)
- Danny Kerr (2021)
- Gabe Wurtz (2021)
- Jeff Serin (2021)
- Jesse Palafox (2021, 2022)
- Kokko Figueiredo (2021)
- Leo Gallegos (2021)
- Neil Taylor (2021)
- BJ Minarcin (2022, 2023)
- Blake Garrett (2022)
- Brandon Bradshaw (2022)
- Brendon Rodriguez (2022)
- Brock Ephan (2022)
- Caden Ledbetter (2022)
- Frank Dickson IV (2022)
- Hunter Treece (2022)
- Ian McCole (2022)
- Kendon Strachan (2022)
- Steve Joyner (2022)
- Tyler Rumbaugh (2022)
- Colin Johnson (2023)
- Daulton Montagna (2023)
- Gabe Ramos (2023)
- Jackson Smith (2023)
- Jaymon Cervantes (2023)
- Kirkland Trahan (2023)
- Madison Santos (2023)
- Travis Cole (2023)
- Zachary Campbell (2023)

== Single season records ==
=== Batting ===
- Games: Burnell Dailey, 65 (2016), Thomas McKenna, 65 (2016), Ryan Retz, 65 (2016)
- Batting average: Thomas DeBonville, .455 (2020)
- On-base percentage: Cedric Reynaud, .533 (2025)
- Slugging percentage: Gabe Wurtz, .841 (2021)
- At bats: Ryan Retz, 281 (2016)
- Runs: Anthony Manisero, 76 (2025)
- Doubles: Austin Hoffman, 22 (2018), Gabe Wurtz, 22 (2021)
- Triples: Ryan Retz, 7 (2016)
- Home runs: Gabe Wurtz, 22 (2021)
- RBI: Gabe Wurtz, 86 (2021)
- Walks: Lawrence Chavez, 70 (2019)
- Strikeouts: Burnell Dailey, 64 (2016)
- Stolen bases: Anthony Manisero, 45 (2025)
- Hits: Michael Morris, 98 (2016)

=== Pitching ===
- Earned run average: Redmond Floyd, 1.12 (2017)
- Win–loss percentage: Steven Borkowski, 1.000 (2016), Clay Miller, 1.000 (2017), Eric Morell, 1.000 (2017)
- WHIP: Tyler Herr, .550 (2016)
- Games: David Robles, 29 (2016)
- Saves: Joe Rivera, 9 (2019)
- Innings: Steven Borkowski, 79.1 (2016)
- Strikeouts: Steven Borkowski, 92 (2016)
- Complete games: Billy Damon, 5 (2018)
- Walks allowed: Steven Borkowski, 46 (2016)
- Hits allowed: Will Morris, 84 (2019)
- Wins: Steven Borkowski, 10 (2016)
- Losses: Will Morris, 4 (2019), Kris Keach, 4 (2019), Austin Cooper, 4 (2019)
- Earned runs allowed: Cameron Cox, 43 (2016)

=== Fielding ===
- Putouts: Ryan Retz, 506 (2016)
- Assists: Michael Morris, 167 (2016)
- Fielding average by an infielder: Jesse Baker, .995 (2016)
- Fielding average by an outfielder: Jay Stout, 1.000 (2018)
