= Monterey Amberjacks =

Baseball team in California

Logo
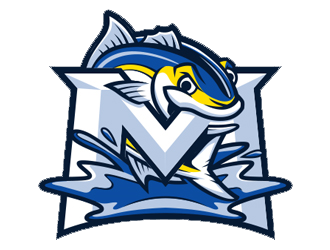
Cap insignia

Information
- League: Pecos League
- Location: Monterey, California
- Ballpark: Frank E. Sollecito, Jr. Ballpark
- Founded: 2016
- Colors: Navy blue, gold, blue, silver, white
- Ownership: Pecos League
- Manager: Joey Gali
- Website: montereyamberjacks.com

The Monterey Amberjacks are a United States professional baseball team based in Monterey, California, which began play in 2017. The team is a member of the Pecos League, an independent baseball league which is not affiliated with Major League Baseball or Minor League Baseball. They play their home games at Frank E. Sollecito, Jr. Ballpark, surrounded by Lake El Estero, with the beach at Monterey Bay Park a short distance beyond the left field fence.

The Monterey Amberjacks did not participate in the Pecos League 2024 season, but will return for 2025.

== Year-by-year records ==
Year	League	Record	Win%	Finish	Manager	Playoffs
2017	Pecos League	18-43	.295	6th	Justin Thompson	Did not qualify
2018	Pecos League	19-43	.304	4th	Edison Alvarez	Did not qualify
2019	Pecos League	36-25	.590	2nd	Thomas Fitzpatrick	Lost Pacific Divisional round (0-2) against Bakersfield Train Robbers
2020	Pecos League	Season cancelled due to the COVID-19 pandemic				
2021	Pecos League	14-24	.368	6th	Thomas Fitzpatrick	Lost in the first round of the Bay Series (0-2) against Martinez Sturgeon
2022	Pecos League	21-29	.420	5th	Thomas Fitspatrick	Did not qualify
2023	Pecos League	31-18	.632	2nd	Johnathan Garza	Lost Pacific Divisional round (1-2) against Bakersfield Train Robbers
2024	Pecos League	Season cancelled (Lease unrenewed)				
Total		139	.435	-	-	1-6 (.160)

== Notable alumni ==
- Jared Koenig (2017)
- Logan Gillaspie (2017)
