= High desert =

High desert or High Desert may refer to the following:

== Places ==
- High Desert, Albuquerque, New Mexico, a development in Albuquerque, New Mexico, United States
- High Desert (California), an area of Southern California deserts just north of the San Bernardino and Little San Bernardino Mountains
- High Desert (Oregon), an area in eastern Oregon, United States
- High Desert County, California, a proposed county in Southern California
- Colorado Plateau, a high desert area in the United States of 337,000 km^{2} (130,000 mi^{2}) in western Colorado, northwestern New Mexico, southern and eastern Utah, and northern Arizona

== Sports ==
- High Desert Elite FC, a soccer team based in Adelanto, California
- High Desert League, an intercollegiate sports league in the Northern Nevada 4A Region
- High Desert League (Central Section), an intercollegiate sports league in California
- High Desert Mavericks, a minor league baseball team from Adelanto, California (1991–2016)
- High Desert Yardbirds, a minor league baseball team from Adelanto, California (2016–2020)

== Other uses ==
- High Desert Broadcasting, a radio broadcasting company
- The High Desert Museum in Bend, Oregon, United States
- High Desert (TV series)
- High Desert Christian Academy
- High Desert Discovery Scenic Byway
- High Desert Kill
- High Desert Middle School (Bend, Oregon)
- High Desert Museum
- High Desert Regional Health Center in Lancaster, California
- High Desert State Prison (Nevada) in Indian Springs, Nevada
- High Desert State Prison (California) in Susanville, California
