= Whiptail =

Whiptail can refer to:

- Fish:
  - A common name for Blue grenadier, a species of fish in the genus Macruronus
  - Whiptail catfish, a common name for the genus of fish Rineloricaria
- A wide variety of long-tailed, New World lizard species from several genera in the Teiidae family; also known as racerunners and jungle runners.
  - Ameiva - jungle runners
  - Aspidoscelis - northern whiptails
  - Cnemidophorus - southern whiptails
  - Kentropyx - spurred whiptails
- Whiptail (company), a company that builds solid-state data storage systems
- Whiptail (plant disorder)
- "Whiptail", a 1998 Hugo Award-nominated science fiction short story by Robert Reed
- Whiptail (comics), a series of recurring adversaries in the comic book series Dynamo 5
- Whiptail (software), in Unix-like shell scripting, a dialog replacement using Newt instead of ncurses
- California City Whiptails, a professional baseball team
- "Whiptail" is the code name for the international assassin (played by Hannah Waddingham) in the 2026 action-comedy series Ride or Die on Prime Video.
