= Carlos Castillo (baseball) =

American baseball player (born 1975)

- Pitcher
- Born: April 21, 1975 (age 50); Boston, Massachusetts, U.S.
- Batted: Right Threw: Right

MLB debut
- April 2, 1997, for the Chicago White Sox

Last MLB appearance
- July 22, 2001, for the Boston Red Sox

MLB statistics
- Win–loss record: 10–7
- Earned run average: 5.04
- Strikeouts: 130
- Stats at Baseball Reference

Teams
- Chicago White Sox (1997–1999); Boston Red Sox (2001)

Carlos Castillo (born April 21, 1975) is an American former pitcher in Major League Baseball who played for the Chicago White Sox and Boston Red Sox in part of four seasons spanning 1997–2001. Listed at 6 feet 2 inches (1.88 m) and 240 pounds (110 kg), he batted and threw right-handed.

== Career ==
In a four-season career, Castillo posted a 10–7 record with 130 strikeouts and a 5.04 ERA in 111 appearances, including six starts, 32 games finished, one save, and 210 2/3 innings pitched.

After that, Castillo pitched in the Japanese and Taiwanese professional baseball leagues. In between, he played winter ball in the Dominican Republic, Puerto Rico and Venezuela.

Additionally, Castillo served as the pitching coach for the South Louisiana Pipeliners of the Continental Baseball League during its 2009 season.
