= Yermín Mercedes =

Dominican baseball player (born 1993)

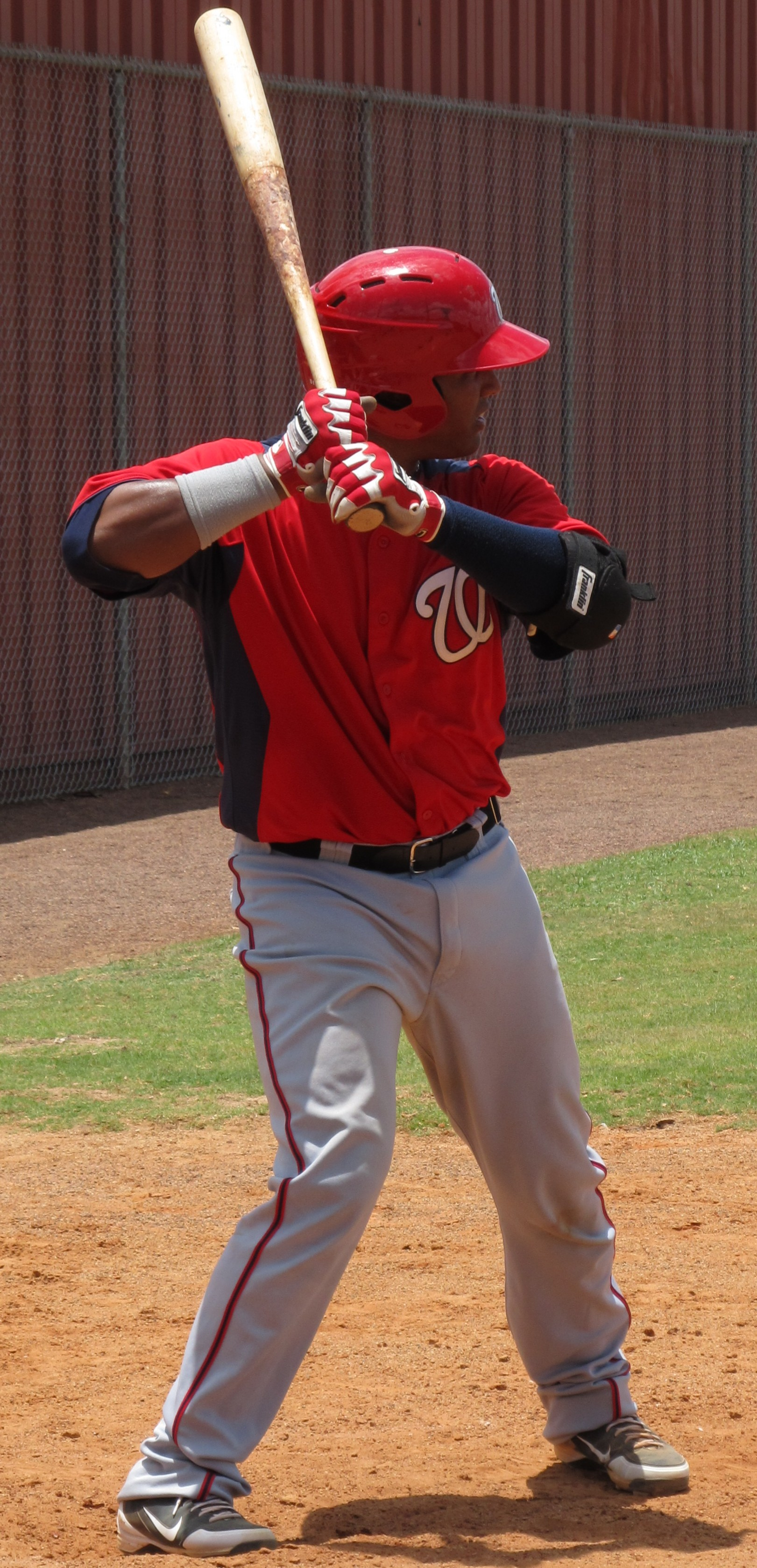
- Mercedes with the Washington Nationals in 2012

Free agent
- Catcher / First baseman / Designated hitter
- Born: February 14, 1993 (age 33); La Romana, Dominican Republic
- Bats: Right Throws: Right

MLB debut
- August 2, 2020, for the Chicago White Sox

MLB statistics (through 2022 season)
- Batting average: .261
- Home runs: 8
- Runs batted in: 45
- Stats at Baseball Reference

Teams
- Chicago White Sox (2020–2021); San Francisco Giants (2022)

Yermín Francisco Mercedes (born February 14, 1993), is a Dominican professional baseball first baseman, catcher, and designated hitter who is a free agent. He has previously played in Major League Baseball (MLB) for the Chicago White Sox and San Francisco Giants. He signed as an international free agent with the Washington Nationals in 2011 and made his MLB debut in 2020 with the White Sox. On April 3, 2021, he set a major league record as the first player in modern MLB history to begin a season with eight consecutive hits. He was named the MLB Rookie of the Month in April 2021.

== Career ==
=== Washington Nationals ===
At 18 years of age, Mercedes signed as an international free agent with the Washington Nationals on March 3, 2011. He spent the 2011, 2012, and 2013 seasons with the DSL Nationals, hitting .302/.352/.396, .327/.412/.398, and .255/359/.349 respectively. On August 24, 2013, Mercedes was released by the Nationals organization.

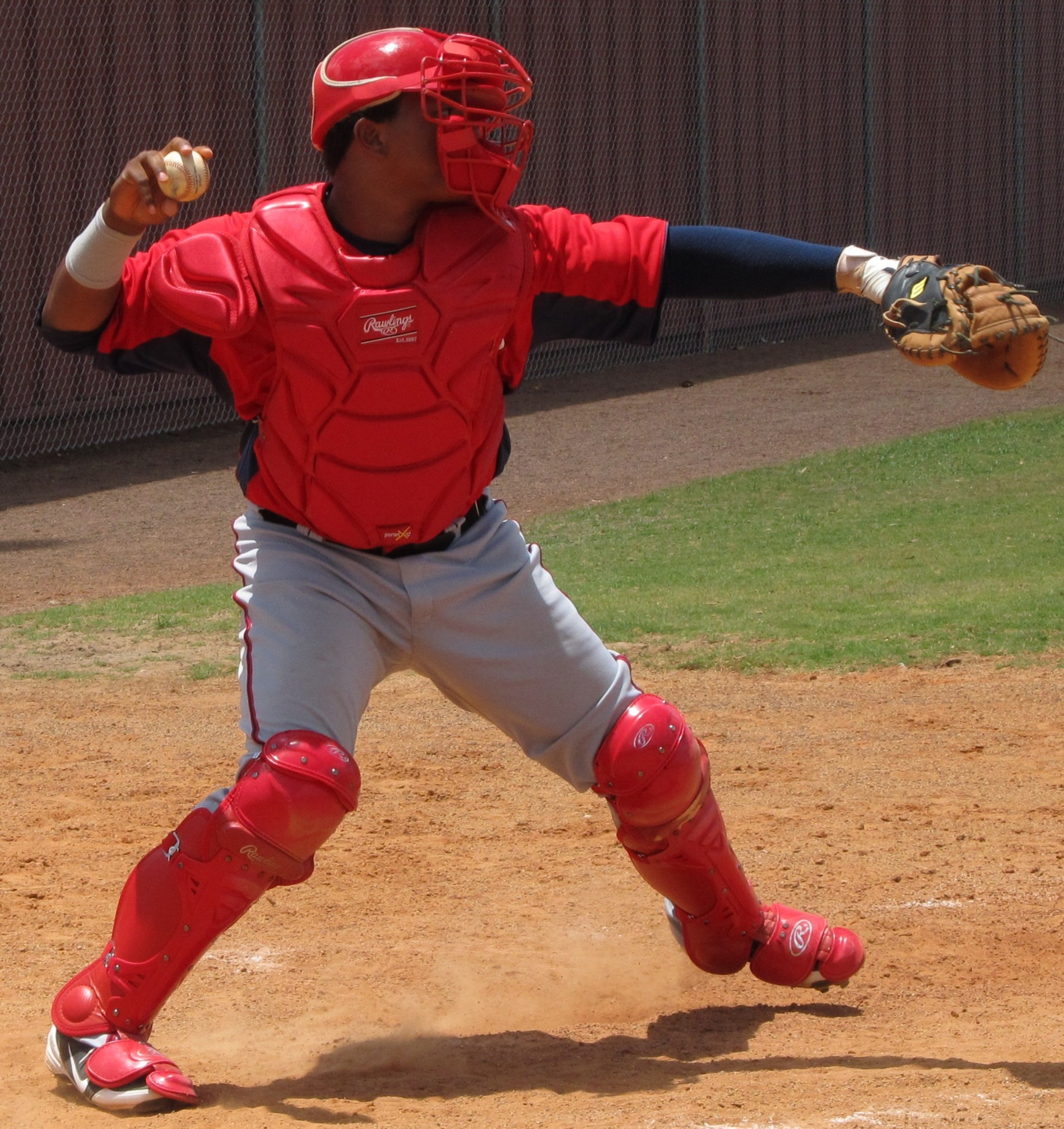
Mercedes with the Washington Nationals organization in 2012

=== Independent Leagues ===
Mercedes spent the 2014 season in independent baseball. He played for the Douglas Diablos and the White Sands Pupfish of the Pecos League, and for the San Angelo Colts of the United League Baseball. In 2014 between the three teams he batted .385/.424/.701 with 17 home runs and 75 RBI in 234 at bats.

=== Baltimore Orioles ===
On September 8, 2014, Mercedes signed a minor league contract with the Baltimore Orioles organization. He spent the 2015 season with the Single–A Delmarva Shorebirds, hitting .272/.302/.456 with eight home runs and 42 RBI in 239 at bats.

He split the 2016 season between Delmarva (with whom he was an SAL mid-season All Star and post-season All Star, and Baseball America Low Single–A All Star) and the High–A Frederick Keys, hitting a combined .345/.404/.570 with 20 home runs, 78 runs, and 77 RBI in 447 at bats. Mercedes split the 2017 season between Frederick and the Double–A Bowie Baysox, hitting a combined .276/.340/.455 with 16 home runs and 62 RBI in 380 at bats.

=== Chicago White Sox ===
==== 2017–20; MLB debut ====
The Chicago White Sox selected Mercedes in the minor league portion of the December 2017 Rule 5 draft. He spent the 2018 season with the High–A Winston-Salem Dash, hitting .289/.362/.478 with 14 home runs (7th in the Carolina League) and 64 RBI (7th) in 360 at bats, playing 79 games at catcher and 14 games at first base. He caught 41% of attempted basestealers.

Mercedes split the 2019 season between the Double–A Birmingham Barons and the Triple–A Charlotte Knights, combining to hit .317/.388/.581 with 23 home runs and 80 RBI in 334 at bats, playing 58 games at catcher, four games at first base, and two games at third base. He caught 44% of attempted basestealers. On November 20, 2019, the White Sox added Mercedes to their 40-man roster to protect him from the Rule 5 draft. Playing for Licey in the Dominican Winter League he hit .341/.375/.477 in 44 at bats, playing catcher, first base, and left field.

On August 1, 2020, Mercedes was called up to the major leagues for the first time. He made his MLB debut the following day as a pinch hitter, grounding out in his only plate appearance for the season.

==== 2021; AL Rookie of the Month ====
Mercedes recorded the first hit of his major league career on April 2, 2021, when he hit a single against the Los Angeles Angels. In the same game, he became the first player in Chicago White Sox history to record five hits in their first major league start. The following day, Mercedes had hits in his first three at bats, including his first Major League home run off of Alex Cobb, becoming the first player since at least 1900 to begin a season with eight straight hits. On April 5, Mercedes was named the American League Player of the Week after batting 9-for-14 with a .643 batting average, 1.643 OPS, and six RBI.

On April 8, Mercedes hit his first home run at Guaranteed Rate Field off of Brad Keller of the Kansas City Royals. His home run was measured at 485 feet; it was the third-longest home run in major league baseball in 2021, and the longest regular-season home run for the White Sox in the Statcast era (since 2015). On April 19, Mercedes made his first pitching appearance during a game against the Red Sox. Mercedes was named the American League Rookie of the Month for the games played in April, in which he batted .415/.455/.659 with five home runs and 16 RBI in 88 plate appearances.

On May 17, in a game against the Minnesota Twins, Mercedes hit a home run to center field on a 3–0 count with an 11-run lead while Willians Astudillo, a position player who had retired the first two batters in the inning, was pitching; in 4 innings Astudillo pitched that season, it was the only hit that he gave up. White Sox manager, 76-year-old Tony La Russa who had just come out of a 10-year retirement, publicly criticized rookie Mercedes in a 15-minute discussion with the press for violating the unwritten rules of baseball, calling him "clueless," and didn't have a problem when the Twins later threw behind Mercedes in apparent retaliation. In contrast, teammates of Mercedes, as well as opponents including pitcher Alex Wood, supported him.

After that game, Mercedes' batting average dropped from a league-leading .364 to .271 by the end of June. He was demoted back to the Triple-A Charlotte Knights on July 2. On July 21, Mercedes announced via his Instagram account that he would be taking an indefinite leave from professional baseball, but the following day Mercedes returned to Charlotte.

In 2021 with the White Sox, Mercedes batted .271/.328/.404 with seven home runs and 37 RBI in 240 at bats, playing 61 games at DH, two at catcher, and one each at first base and pitcher. The maximum exit velocity of balls he hit was in the top 2% in the major leagues, at 116.8 mph. With Charlotte he batted .275/.318/.464 with 11 home runs, 32 runs, and 29 RBI in 222 at bats, splitting time in the field between first base and catcher with an inning at third base.

==== 2022 ====
During spring training in 2022, Mercedes was diagnosed with a fracture in the hamate bone in his left hand, requiring surgery in late March. He returned to Charlotte in May, where he hit .230/.376/.425 with 4 home runs, 14 runs, and 13 RBI in 87 at bats over 25 games, playing 16 games at DH and 9 games at first base. Mercedes was designated for assignment on June 12, 2022.

=== San Francisco Giants ===
The San Francisco Giants claimed Mercedes off of waivers on June 18, 2022. They promoted him to the major leagues on June 26. In 31 games for the Giants, Mercedes batted .233/.325/.342 with one home run and 8 RBI. On September 9, Mercedes was removed from the 40-man roster and sent outright to the Triple-A Sacramento River Cats following the promotion of Austin Dean. On October 14, Mercedes was released by the Giants.

=== Acereros de Monclova ===
On April 12, 2023, Mercedes signed with the Acereros de Monclova of the Mexican League. In 20 games, he batted .236/.345/.389 with 2 home runs and 8 RBIs. Mercedes was released by the team on May 15.

=== Saraperos de Saltillo ===
On April 2, 2024, Mercedes signed with the Kansas City Monarchs of the American Association of Professional Baseball. Prior to the start of the season on April 26, Mercedes signed with the Saraperos de Saltillo of the Mexican League. In 75 games for Saltillo, he hit .300/.372/.470 with 11 home runs, 41 RBI, and eight stolen bases. On December 3, Mercedes was released by the Saraperos.

=== Centauros de La Guaira ===
In 2025, Mercedes signed with the Centauros de La Guaira of the Venezuelan Major League. He became a free agent following the season.

== See also ==
- Rule 5 draft results
