= Eric Yardley =

American baseball player (born 1990)

- Pitcher
- Born: August 18, 1990 (age 34); Richland, Washington, U.S.
- Batted: Right Threw: Right

MLB debut
- August 21, 2019, for the San Diego Padres

Last MLB appearance
- June 17, 2021, for the Milwaukee Brewers

MLB statistics
- Win–loss record: 2–1
- Earned run average: 3.52
- Strikeouts: 31
- Stats at Baseball Reference

Teams
- San Diego Padres (2019); Milwaukee Brewers (2020–2021)

Eric Christian Yardley (born August 18, 1990) is an American former professional baseball pitcher. He played in Major League Baseball (MLB) for the San Diego Padres and Milwaukee Brewers.

== Playing career ==
=== Early career ===
Yardley attended Richland High School in Richland, Washington. He attended Seattle University and played college baseball for the Redhawks for four seasons (2010-2013).

Yardley was undrafted out of college in 2013, and played for the Taos Blizzard and the Trinidad Triggers of the independent Pecos League.

=== San Diego Padres ===
Yardley signed a minor league contract with the San Diego Padres on July 21, 2013. He played for the AZL Padres in 2013, going 2–0 with a 1.89 ERA in 19 innings. He split the 2014 season between the Fort Wayne TinCaps and the San Antonio Missions, combining to go 2–4 with a 2.95 ERA in 65 innings. He split the 2015 season between the Lake Elsinore Storm and San Antonio, combining to go 2–5 with a 2.97 ERA in 66 2/3 innings. Following the 2015 season, Yardley played for the Peoria Javelinas of the Arizona Fall League.

Yardley split the 2016, 2017, and 2018 seasons each between San Antonio and the El Paso Chihuahuas. He combined to go 3–2 with a 2.93 ERA over 70 2/3 innings in 2016, 3–2 with a 2.05 ERA over 70 innings in 2017, and 5–4 with a 4.13 ERA over 60 1/3 innings in 2018. He opened the 2019 season back with El Paso, going 0–2 with a 2.83 ERA and 52 strikeouts over 63 2/3 innings.

On August 21, 2019, the Padres selected Yardley's contract and promoted him to the major leagues. He made his major league debut that day versus the Cincinnati Reds, allowing three runs (one earned) in a 1/3 of an inning and suffering the loss. In 10 games for the Padres, Yardley went 0–1 with a 2.31 ERA and 7 strikeouts in 11 2/3 innings. Yardley was designated for assignment on November 4, 2019.

=== Milwaukee Brewers ===
On November 15, 2019, Yardley was claimed off waivers by the Milwaukee Brewers. Yardley enjoyed a great year for the Brewers in 2020, pitching to a 2-0 record and a 1.54 ERA with 19 strikeouts in 23.1 innings of work. Yardley was not quite as successful in 2021, struggling to a 6.75 ERA in 17 appearances with the Brewers. On November 5, 2021, Yardley was outrighted off of the 40-man roster and elected free agency.

=== Chicago Cubs ===
On January 25, 2022, Yardley signed a minor league contract with the Chicago Cubs. Yardley struggled immensely to the tune of a 17.36 ERA in 5 appearances for the Triple-A Iowa Cubs before he was released on May 2.

=== Toronto Blue Jays ===
On May 25, 2022, Yardley signed a minor league contract with the Toronto Blue Jays organization and was assigned to the Triple-A Buffalo Bisons. In 32 appearances with Buffalo, Yardley registered a 3-2 record and 4.13 ERA with 31 strikeouts in 32 2/3 innings pitched. He elected free agency following the season on November 10.

=== Arizona Diamondbacks ===
On January 25, 2023, Yardley signed a minor league contract with the Arizona Diamondbacks organization. Yardley was released by the organization on March 24.

== Coaching career ==
On December 22, 2023, Yardley was hired by the Toronto Blue Jays to serve as an assistant pitching coach for their Double–A affiliate, the New Hampshire Fisher Cats. He was named as the bullpen coach for the 2024 season. On February 13, 2025, Yardley was announced as the pitching coach for the Vancouver Canadians, Toronto's High-A affiliate.

== Personal life ==
Yardley is married to Tia Yardley.
