= Cross Timbers Park =

Park in Texas, United States

Coordinates: 32.888079°N 97.226547°W

Cross Timbers Park is a park located in North Richland Hills, Texas. The park claims 101 acres (0.41 km^{2}) of land. Included in the park are playgrounds, walking trails and a youth baseball complex with three lighted fields and a practice field. In 2007 the baseball complex acted as the home field for the Tarrant County Blue Thunder of the Continental Baseball League.
