= Bisbee Blue (baseball) =

Amateur collegiate summer league team

- Logo

Information
- League: Kino League
- Location: Bisbee, Arizona
- Ballpark: Warren Ballpark
- Founded: 2014
- Former league: Pecos League (2014)
- Colors: blue and black
- Manager: Sean Repay
- Website: bisbee.pecosleague.com

The Bisbee Blue are an amateur collegiate summer league team. They were a professional baseball team based in Bisbee, Arizona. The team was a member of the Pecos League, an independent baseball league which is not affiliated with Major or Minor League Baseball.

They played at Warren Ballpark and began operations with the 2014 season. After the season, the Blue chose to leave the Pecos League in order to play in the Kino League as an amateur team. The Pecos League put a Team in Tucson instead, who play at Warren Ballpark on Sundays.
