= Ruidoso Osos =

Former New Mexican professional baseball team

- Logo

Information
- Location: Ruidoso, New Mexico
- Ballpark: White Mountain Park
- Founded: 2011
- Former name: Raton Osos (2013-2014)
- Former league: Pecos League (2011, 2018)
- Former ballpark(s): Gabrielle Field at Legion Park (Raton, NM)
- Colors: Orange, brown, black
- Ownership: Pecos League
- Website: www.ruidosoosos.com

The Ruidoso Osos were a professional baseball team based in Ruidoso, New Mexico. The team was a member of the Pecos League, an independent baseball league which is not affiliated with Major or Minor League Baseball. The team played its home games at White Mountain Park and began operations for the 2011 season. They had previously been based in Raton, New Mexico in 2013 and 2014.

== History ==
The Osos were originally founded in 2011 and played one season in Ruidoso before folding. The team announced in 2012 that they would be moving 300 miles north to Raton for the 2013 season. After the 2014 season, the Osos once again folded.

On September 20, 2017, the Pecos League announced that the Osos would resume operations for the 2018 season in Ruidoso.

In 2018, the Osos conducted Spring Training in Tucson, Arizona and played an exhibition game on May 20, 2018 against the Tucson Saguaros.

Following the 2018 season, the Osos folded for the third time, and were replaced by the Wasco Reserves.

The Osos were brought back for the 2020 season after White Mountain Park installed new lights for playing during night games. However, due to the reorganization of the League, the team folded once again.

== Season-by-Season ==
Season	W	L	Win%	Result	Playoffs
2011	38	29	.567	3rd of 6 Pecos League	Division: defeated White Sands Pupfish 2-0 Championship: lost Roswell Invaders 2-0
2013	13	54	.194	4th of 4 North Division	Did not qualify
2014	23	38	.377	3rd of 5 North Division	Did not qualify
2018	29	35	.453	3rd of 4 Southern Division	Did not qualify
