= Wildcat Field (League City, Texas) =

Baseball field in League City, Texas, US

- Interactive map of Wildcat Field
- Coordinates: 29.52375°N 95.07472°W
- Owner: Clear Creek ISD
- Operator: Clear Creek ISD
- Capacity: 1,000 (approx.)

Tenants
- Clear Creek High School Wildcats Baseball team (??? – Present); Bay Area Toros (CBL) (2007 (Partial))

Website
- Official site

Wildcat Field is a baseball field on the campus of Clear Creek High School in League City, Texas. It is named after the school's mascot, the "Wildcats." It is located adjacent to the Clear Creek Independent School District Stadium. It is the home of the Clear Creek High School Wildcats baseball team and was home to the Bay Area Toros of the Continental Baseball League in 2007.
