= KPTG =

KPTG may refer to:

- KPTG-LP, a low-power radio station (107.1 FM) licensed to serve Adelanto, California, United States
- KDEF-LP, a low-power radio station (101.5 FM) licensed to serve Adelanto, California, which held the call sign KPTG-LP from 2006 to 2017
