= High Desert Elite FC =

American soccer team

- Full name: High Desert Elite FC
- Founded: 2018
- Stadium: Adelanto Stadium; Adelanto, California
- Head coach: Fidel Gonzalez
- League: United Premier Soccer League
- Website: https://highdesertelite.com/
Home colors	Away colors

High Desert Elite FC is an American soccer team based in the Adelanto, California that plays in the United Premier Soccer League.

== History ==
High Desert Elite FC was formed in 2018. It was the second attempt at fielding a team in Adelanto, after the High Desert Fury were announced in 2017, but later folded. They joined the National Premier Soccer League, a tier four league, to begin play in the 2019 season. They play out of Adelanto Stadium, a multi-purpose facility, that they shared with baseball team, High Desert Yardbirds until 2019. They played their first home match on March 3, in front of a large crowd of over 1200 fans, losing 3–0 to Temecula FC. High Desert Elite FC later joined the United Premier Soccer League Premier Division.

== Year-by-Year ==
Year	Division	League	Record	Regular season	Playoffs	US Open Cup
2019	4	NPSL	4–14–0	9th, West-Southwest	Did not qualify	Did not qualify
2020	4	NPSL	Season cancelled due to COVID-19 Pandemic			
2021	4	UPSL	1-0-0	3rd, Western-SoCal UPSL Premier Division		Did not enter
