= Great Bend Boom =

- Logo

Information
- League: Pecos League
- Location: Great Bend, Kansas
- Ballpark: Al Burns Memorial Field
- Founded: 2016
- Folded: 2016
- Colors: Royal Purple, Orange
- Manager: Dave Boron
- Website: www.greatbendboom.com

The Great Bend Boom were a professional baseball team based in Great Bend, Kansas that played only during the 2016 season. The Boom played in the Pecos League, an independent baseball league which is not affiliated with Major or Minor League Baseball.
