= Santa Rosa Scuba Divers =

Professional baseball team in California

Information
- League: Pecos League (Pacific Division)
- Location: Santa Rosa, California
- Ballpark: Doyle Park
- Founded: 2022
- Colors: Red and black
- Website: www.santarosascubadivers.com

The Santa Rosa Scuba Divers were a professional baseball team based in Santa Rosa, California, that began play in 2022. They were a member of the Pacific Division of the Pecos League, an independent baseball league which is not affiliated with Major League Baseball or Minor League Baseball. They played their home games at Doyle Park.

== History ==
=== 2014: Proposed team in New Mexico ===
The city of Santa Rosa, New Mexico, attempted to get the Pecos League to move a team into its city in 2014. The team was to be named the Scuba Divers after the well known Blue Hole located near the city. With the team name and jerseys created, the Pecos League was unable to finalize an agreement with the city and the team was never finalized. However, the Pecos League played one game per season from 2014–2016 at Santa Rosa High School.

=== 2022: First season in California ===
On April 13, 2022, the Pecos League announced the Scuba Divers as a new team in the Pacific North Division. They played their home games in Santa Rosa, California at Doyle Park. Despite having no affiliation with Santa Rosa, New Mexico or the Scuba Divers team name, the team stayed with the previously designed Red and White team color and name. The team was managed by Corey Monroe, who led them to a 22–29 regular season record. They were defeated two games to zero against the San Rafael Pacifics in the quarterfinals.

On January 2, 2023, the Scuba Divers announced their season schedule for its second season. On March 31, 2023, the Scuba Divers announced they would not be returning for the season. The team cited they were unable to operate because of logistical issues.

=== 2025: Return to Pecos League ===
On April 10, 2025, the Pecos League announced the return of the Scuba Divers. The team replaced the Vallejo Seaweed, which folded just over a month before the season. The coaching staff and players were operated by former Seaweed personnel.

In June it was announced the team would return to Vallejo and play as the Seaweed for the remainder of the 2025 season.

== Season-by-season records ==
Santa Rosa Scuba Divers
Season	League	Division	Record	Win %	Finish	Manager	Playoffs
2022	Pecos	Pacific North	22–29	.431	2nd	Cory Monroe	Lost Pacific Division semifinals 0–2 (SRF)
Totals			22–29	.431	—	—	0–2 (.000)
