= Adelanto Stadium =

Baseball stadium in Adelanto, California, U.S.

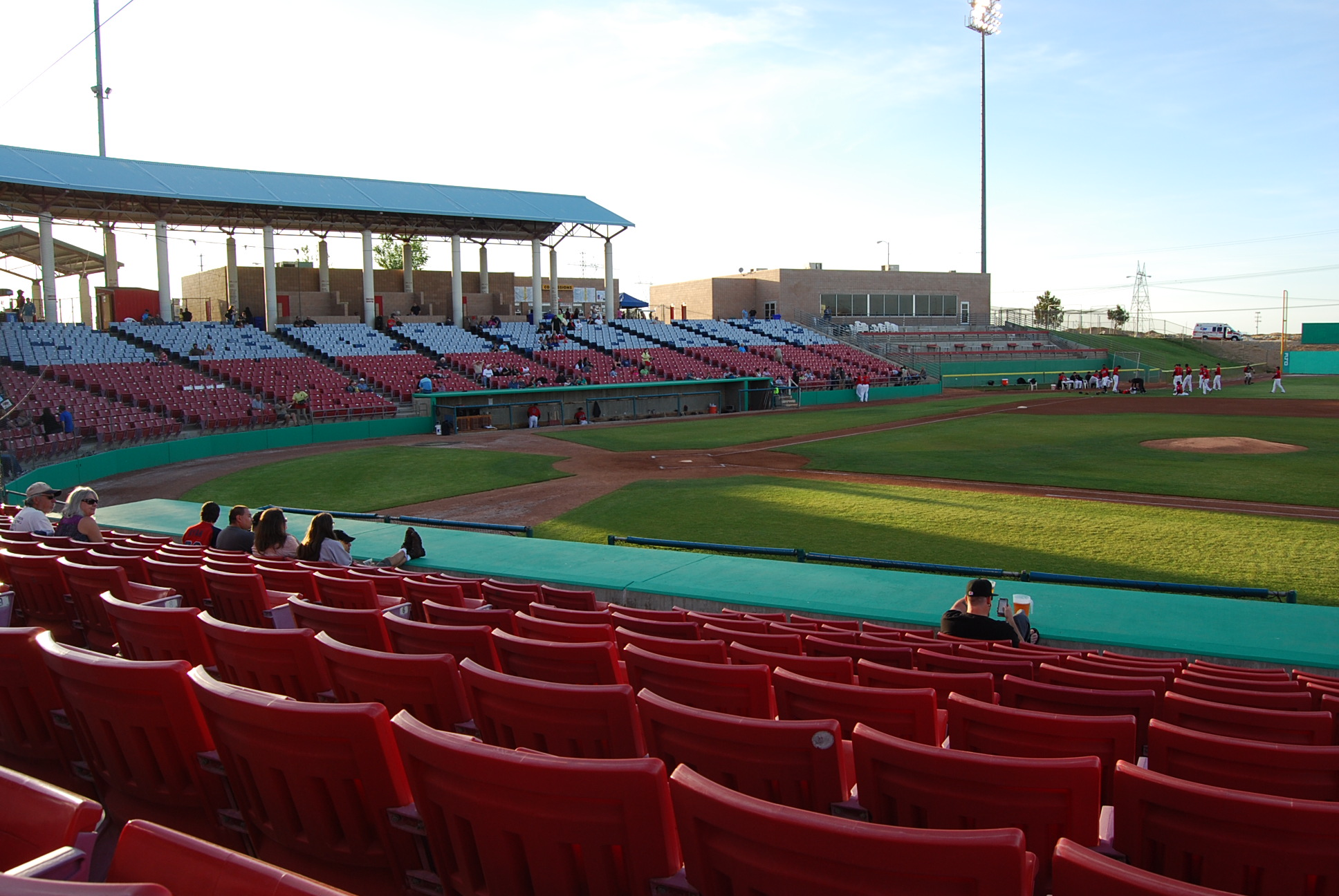
- Adelanto Plaza & Event Center
- Interactive map of Adelanto Stadium
- Former names: Maverick Stadium (1991–2006); Stater Bros. Stadium (2007–2014); Heritage Field at Maverick Stadium (2015–2016)
- Location: 12000 Stadium Way; Adelanto, California 92301
- Coordinates: 34.5548°N 117.4018°W
- Owner: City of Adelanto
- Operator: City of Adelanto
- Capacity: 3,808 permanent stadium seats plus grass seating
- Surface: Grass
- Field size: Left Field: 340 feet Center Field: 401 feet Right Field: 340 feet Backstop: 50 feet

Construction
- Groundbreaking: October 1990
- Opened: April 23, 1991
- Cost: $6.5 million ($15.4 million in 2025 dollars)
- Architect: HNTB
- Services engineer: EquitySpec Consulting Engineers

Tenants
- High Desert Mavericks (CL) (1991–2016); High Desert Yardbirds (PL) (2017–2019); High Desert Elite FC (NPSL) (2019–)

Adelanto Plaza & Event Center is a multi-purpose stadium in Adelanto, California..

== History ==
It was built in 1991, when the High Desert Mavericks came to the area. Mavericks Stadium now known as Adelanto Plaza & Event Center, a $6.5 million facility, opened on April 23, 1991. The green of the baseball diamond sharply contrasts the surrounding desert landscape.

Fan support in the High Desert was a Minor League success story in their first year. In 1991, the Mavericks became the first team in the California League to draw over 200,000 fans in one season. In 1996, the Mavericks drew their one-millionth fan, becoming one of the fastest teams to reach that milestone.

The venue has a reputation as a hitter-friendly ballpark.

The Mavericks' Luke Tendler hit the final California League home run in Heritage Field at Maverick Stadium and the Mavericks history with a solo shot in the bottom of the eighth inning on September 17, 2016. The 7 - 4 victory over the Visalia Rawhide was the Mavericks final game in the stadium, as the team was contracted out after the season.

The attendance for the final game ever played at Heritage Field at Maverick Stadium was 1,991. 1991 was also the same year that the Mavericks began play.

It was reported that Heritage Field at Maverick Stadium was trashed, with about $10,000 in damages done to the stadium after the Mavericks final game on September 17, 2016. Adelanto Mayor Rich Kerr called it a “petulant act of vandalism,” and it included damages to the Mavericks locker room, field and concourse.

After the California League contracted the league to eight teams by eliminating the High Desert Mavericks (along with the Bakersfield Blaze) at the end of the 2016 season, the City of Adelanto struck a deal with the San Bernardino County Fair (28th District Agricultural Association) to manage and market the stadium. That contract lasted one year and was not renewed at the end of 2017. In February 2018 the city council voted to retain control of the stadium and hired a contract employee to manage day-to-day operations on behalf of the city.

The Pecos League, an independent league not affiliated with Minor League Baseball, moved in to Adelanto Stadium in 2017 to form the High Desert Yardbirds. They played only two seasons in the venue, with the 2019 season holding no home games at the site. The team was folded that year.

== Naming rights ==
For the stadium's first 16 years, it was called Mavericks Stadium. It received its Stater Bros. Stadium name in 2007 when Stater Bros., a supermarket chain based in San Bernardino bought the naming rights. In 2014, it was renamed Heritage Field at Stater Bros. Stadium when a naming-rights deal was signed between the Mavericks and the Heritage Victor Valley Medical Group. In 2015, the name was updated to Heritage Field at Maverick Stadium. With the Mavericks leaving at the end of the 2016 season, the facility is now simply called Adelanto Stadium.
