= Oro Grande Elementary School District =

School district in California, United States

Address
- 19900 National Trails Highway Oro Grande, California, 92368; United States

District information
- Type: Public
- Grades: K–12
- Established: July 1, 1980; 46 years ago
- NCES District ID: 0628950

Students and staff
- Students: 2,329
- Teachers: 134.11
- Staff: 143.43
- Student–teacher ratio: 17.37

Other information
- Website: orogrande.net

The Oro Grande School district is located in the town of Oro Grande, California. The district was founded in 1980.

Oro Grande School District is composed of five schools, four of which are charter schools or academies that take in students from outside the district.

The district includes portions of Adelanto and Victorville.

Specifically, some schools within Oro Grande School District are, Riverside Preparatory Elementary, Riverside Preparatory Middle School and Riverside Preparatory High School.

== Board of Trustees ==
Unlike other school boards within San Bernardino County, Oro Grande only operates with three board members

Members:

Edna Rodriguez - President

Roberto Garcia Jr - Clerk

Paula Ramirez - Board Member

These members also run the charter school boards, which operate separately as the Mojave River Academy Schools Board and the Riverside Preparatory School Board Meeting

=== Elementary school ===
Oro Grande Elementary School serves grades Kindergarten through six in a college preparatory setting. It is the only non-charter school. Students at Oro Grande Elementary who are not admitted to the charter high school attend school in the Victor Valley Union High School District schools for secondary education

=== Charter Schools ===
==== Riverside Preparatory School ====
Riverside Preparatory School compromises of three schools. All Located within Oro Grande.

- Riverside Preparatory Elementary
- Riverside Preparatory Middle School
- Riverside Preparatory High School

==== Mojave River Academy ====
Mojave River Academy serves grades Kindergarten through grade twelve in an Independent Study program. Under the Mojave River Academy Charter system, Oro Grande School District has offices 11 cities outside of Oro Grande located in Bakersfield, Barstow, Beaumont, Colton, Desert Hot Springs, Fontana, Hesperia, Palm Springs, Phelan, Tehachapi, Victorville

Mojave River is under seven charters named:

- Gold Canyon
  - Serves Fontana
  - Serves Desert Hot Springs
- Marble City
  - Serves Phelan
  - Serves Desert Hot Springs
- National Trails
  - Serves Colton
  - Serves Beaumont
- Oro Grande
  - Serves Victorville
  - Serves Bakersfield
- Rockview Park
  - Serves Hesperia
  - Serves Desert Hot Springs
- Route 66
  - Serves Victorville
  - Serves Palm Springs
- Silver Mountain
  - Serves Barstow
  - Serves Tehachapi
