= Chris Smith (pitcher, born 1988) =

American baseball player

- Pitcher
- Born: August 19, 1988 (age 37); Louisville, Kentucky, U.S.
- Batted: Right Threw: Right

MLB debut
- June 27, 2017, for the Toronto Blue Jays

Last MLB appearance
- July 28, 2017, for the Toronto Blue Jays

MLB statistics
- Win–loss record: 0–0
- Earned run average: 5.40
- Strikeouts: 1
- WHIP: 1.60
- Stats at Baseball Reference

Teams
- Toronto Blue Jays (2017)

Christopher Patrick Smith (born August 19, 1988) is an American former professional baseball pitcher. He played in Major League Baseball (MLB) for the Toronto Blue Jays in 2017.

== High school and college ==
Smith attended Butler Traditional High School in Louisville, Kentucky and played college baseball at Kentucky Wesleyan College, where he was a second baseman and pitcher. He holds the record for games started with the Panthers at 187, as well as saves with eight. Smith majored in fitness and sports management.

== Professional career ==
=== Frontier League/Pecos League ===
Unchosen in the Major League draft, Smith was selected in the first round of the independent Frontier League's draft by the Lake Erie Crushers. Smith played in 1 game for the team, posting a 36.00 ERA after allowing 4 runs in just an inning of work.

In 2011, Smith played for the Traverse City Beach Bums and Washington Wild Things of the Frontier League, as well as the White Sands Pupfish of the Pecos League. In 13 combined appearances, Smith pitched to a 4–2 win–loss record, 3.64 earned run average (ERA), and 54 strikeouts in 59 1/3 innings pitched. In the offseason, Smith played for the Brisbane Bandits of the Australian Baseball League, where he posted a 3–3 record, 2.31 ERA, and 65 strikeouts in 50 2/3 innings. He returned to the Washington Wild Things in 2012, where he logged a 9–6 record and 2.92 ERA in 19 appearances.

=== New York Yankees ===
On January 3, 2013, Smith signed a minor league contract with the New York Yankees organization, but did not play that year due to a stress fracture in his forearm. In 2014, he was assigned to their Class-A affiliate, the Charleston RiverDogs. He was later promoted to the Advanced-A Tampa Yankees, and in 32 total relief appearances, posted a 1–2 record, 2.98 ERA, and 49 strikeouts in 51 1/3 innings. Smith began the 2015 season with Tampa, and in May earned a promotion to the Double-A Trenton Thunder. At the end of May he was sent back to Tampa, and on July 26, Smith was released by the Yankees organization.

=== Toronto Blue Jays ===
On August 1, 2015, Smith signed a minor league contract with the Toronto Blue Jays and played with the Advanced-A Dunedin Blue Jays and Double-A New Hampshire Fisher Cats. Smith made 31 total relief appearances in 2015, and pitched to a 4–2 record, 2.05 ERA, and 57 strikeouts in 52 2/3 innings. In the offseason, he played for the Gigantes de Carolina of the Liga de Béisbol Profesional Roberto Clemente. Smith was assigned to New Hampshire to open the 2016 minor league season, and earned a late-season promotion to the Triple-A Buffalo Bisons. He recorded a stellar campaign, making 47 appearances and posting a 1–3 record, 1.93 ERA, 76 strikeouts, and 15 saves in 60 2/3 innings.

Smith was called up by the Blue Jays for the first time on September 27, 2016; however, he didn't make an appearance for the team. After Jason Grilli was designated for assignment on June 27, 2017, Smith was recalled by the Blue Jays. On August 12, Smith was designated for assignment. On November 7, 2017, Smith elected free agency.

=== Washington Nationals ===
On December 21, 2017, Smith signed a minor league contract with the Washington Nationals. He was assigned to the Triple-A Syracuse Chiefs, where he posted a 4–5 record and 3.93 ERA in 49 appearances. Smith elected free agency following the season on November 2, 2018.

=== Detroit Tigers ===
On December 13, 2018, Smith signed a minor league contract with the Detroit Tigers organization. Early in spring training, Smith suffered a torn ulnar collateral ligament in his right elbow, which required Tommy John surgery. Smith was released by the Tigers on March 5, 2019, after the season ending injury. Smith re-signed with the Tigers on a minor league deal on February 7, 2020. Smith did not play in a game in 2020 due to the cancellation of the minor league season because of the COVID-19 pandemic. He was released by the Tigers organization on July 3, 2020.

On June 27, 2021, Smith announced his retirement from professional baseball via Twitter.
