= Fort Marcy Ballfield =

Baseball stadium in Santa Fe, New Mexico

- Interactive map of Fort Marcy Ballfield
- Location: 490 Bishops Lodge Road Santa Fe, NM 87501
- Coordinates: 35.6956°N 105.9348°W
- Owner: City of Santa Fe
- Operator: City of Santa Fe
- Capacity: Baseball: 1,100
- Surface: Natural Grass
- Field size: Left – 340'; Center – 355'; Right – 305'

Construction
- Opened: 1936

Tenant
- Santa Fe Fuego (PL) 2012–present

Fort Marcy Ballfield or Fort Marcy Ballpark is an approximately 1,100-seat baseball stadium in Santa Fe, New Mexico, USA. The ballpark is part of the City of Santa Fe's Fort Marcy Recreation Complex, located on the former United States military reservation Fort Marcy. It was constructed in 1936 as a Works Progress Administration project. The ballpark is at an elevation of approximately 7,000 feet above sea level.

The ballpark has been home to the Santa Fe Fuego, a professional baseball team belonging to the independent Pecos League, since 2012. The Fuego played their first ever game at Fort Marcy on May 8, 2012, defeating to the Trinidad Triggers 14 runs to 8. The stadium hosted the 2021 Pecos League All Star Game.

Fort Marcy also hosts many Santa Fe youth and amateur baseball events, including serving as the occasional home of the Santa Fe Preparatory School varsity baseball team.

Outside of baseball, the ballpark hosts the annual Burning of Zozobra, part of the Fiestas de Santa Fe, each September.

== See also ==
- Santa Fe Fuego
- Pecos League
