= Albert Park, San Rafael =

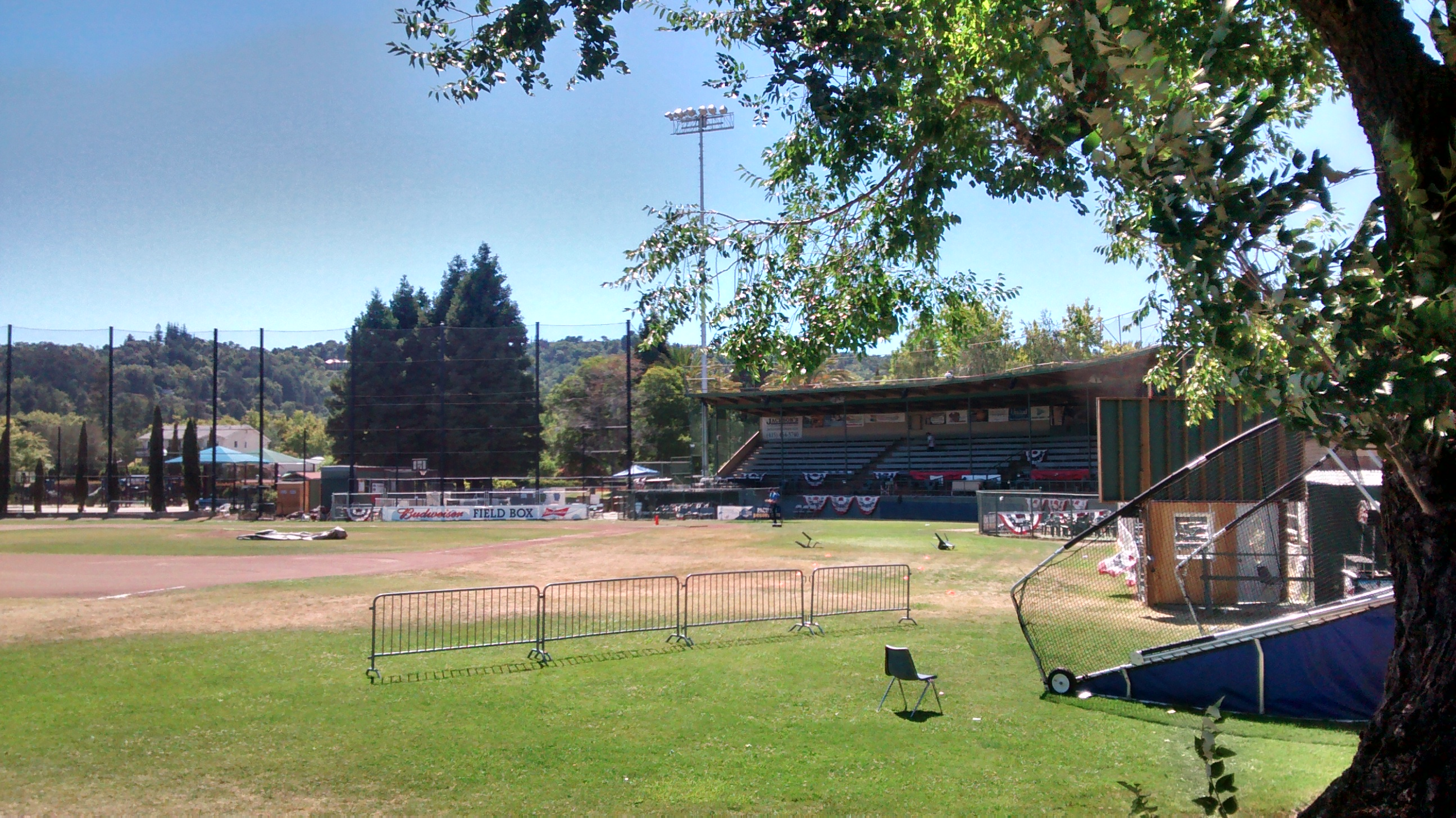
- Albert Park in June 2014
- Interactive map of Albert Park, San Rafael
- Address: 1115 2nd St, San Rafael, CA 94901-3932
- Location: San Rafael, California
- Coordinates: 37.969°N 122.528°W
- Capacity: 1,200
- Type: Baseball field
- Event: Sports
- Field size: Left field: 325 feet (99 m); Center field: 370 feet (110 m); Right field: 325 feet (99 m)

Construction
- Opened: March 18, 1951; 75 years ago
- Renovated: 2011

Tenant
- San Rafael Pacifics (NAL/PA/PL) 2012–present

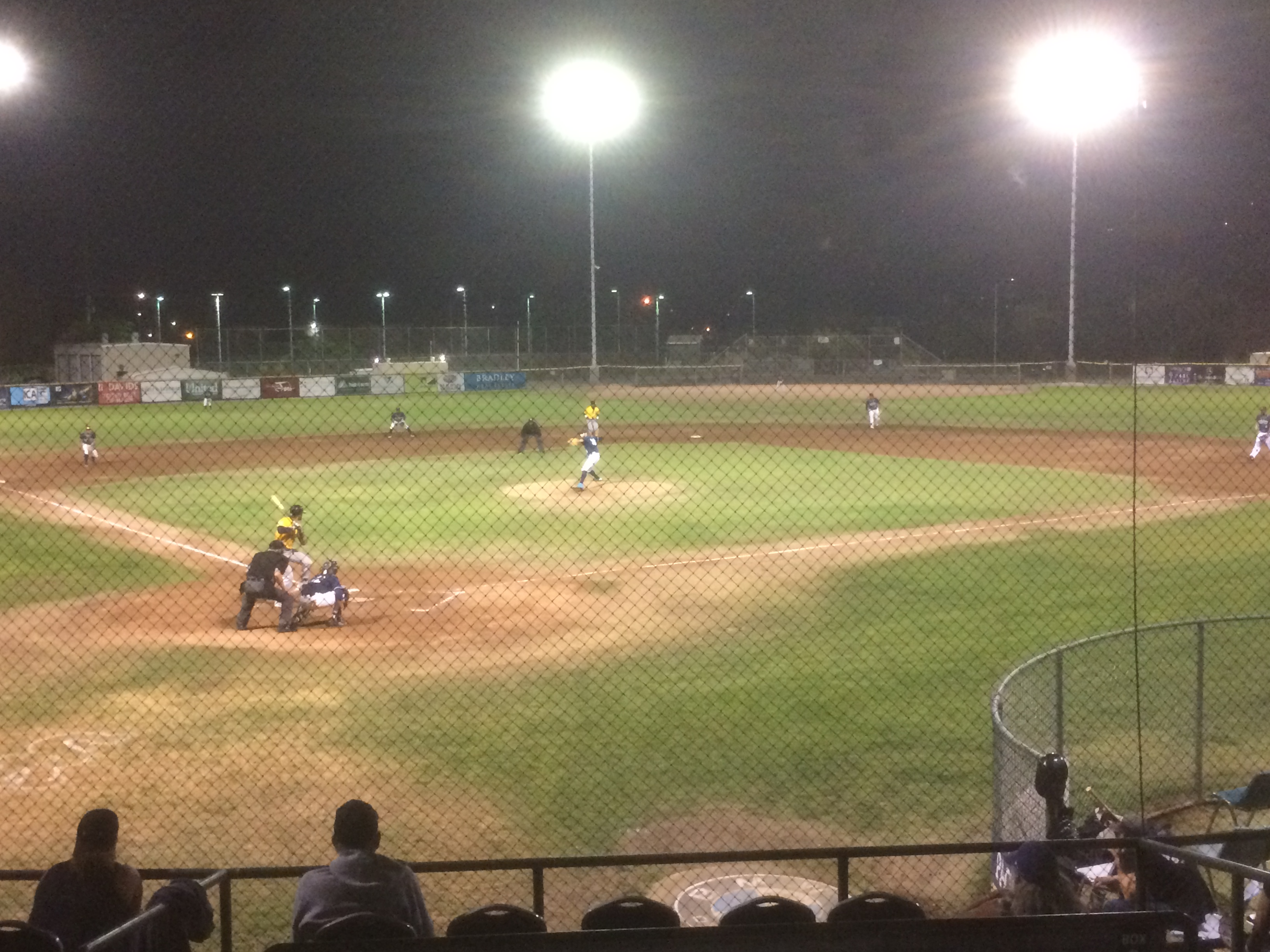
San Rafael Pacifics vs Vallejo Admirals, July 24, 2018

Albert Park is a baseball field that is now home to the San Rafael Pacifics. The Pacifics are a member of the Pecos League, an independent professional baseball league not affiliated with Major League Baseball. The park opened March 18, 1951, on land donated by businessman and local entrepreneur Jacob Albert in 1937. In the early 1950s, Yankee infielder and future legendary skipper Billy Martin would bring a bunch of the best semipro players from his side of the bay over to Albert Park for a weekend. The field measurements are 325 ft (99 m) on the left- and right-field lines and 370 ft (110 m) in center field.
