= Bay Area Toros =

Professional baseball team based in Texas City, Texas

- Logo

Information
- Location: Texas City, Texas
- Ballpark: Robinson Stadium
- Founded: 2007
- Disbanded: 2009
- League championships: 1 (2008)
- Division championships: 2 (2008, 2009)
- Former name: Bay Area Toros (2007–09)
- Former league: Continental Baseball League (2007–09)
- Former ballpark: Wildcat Field
- Colors: Red, black, white, silver
- Ownership: Toros Baseball Club, LLC
- General manager: Mike Pede
- Manager: Jim Bolt
- Website: www.bayareatoros.com

Current uniforms

The Bay Area Toros were a professional baseball team based in Texas City, Texas, in the United States. The Toros were a member of the Continental Baseball League, which is not affiliated with Major League Baseball. From the 2008 season to 2009, the Toros played their home games at Robinson Stadium. In 2010, the Toros suspended operations, announcing they could return for the 2011 season. The Toros were the first minor league baseball team in the Houston metropolitan area since the 1970s.

== Year-by-year record ==
| Season | Finish | W-L | Win% | Playoffs |
|---|---|---|---|---|
| 2007 | 4th | 13-28 | .317 | Runners-up |
| 2008 | 1st | 44-29 | .603 | Champions |
| 2009 | 1st | 38-18 | .679 | Runners-up |

== Notable players ==
On March 22, 2008, pitcher Brandon Sisk signed with the Kansas City Royals organization.
