= Las Cruces Vaqueros =

Former professional baseball team

- Logo

Information
- League: Pecos League (2011–2012, 2015)
- Location: Las Cruces, New Mexico
- Ballpark: Apodoca Park
- Founded: 2010
- Former league: Continental Baseball League (2010)
- Colors: Powder Blue, Gold, Royal
- Ownership: Andrew Dunn
- Manager: Darrell Carrillo
- Media: Lawrence Bravo; Las Cruces Sun-News
- Website: www.lascrucesvaqueros.com

The Las Cruces Vaqueros were a professional baseball team based in Las Cruces, New Mexico that began play in 2010 and ended in 2015. The Vaqueros played in the Pecos League of Professional Baseball Clubs, an independent baseball league which is not affiliated with Major or Minor League Baseball.

Las Cruces Vaqueros played their home games at Apodoca Park, which seats 1,500 fans. The team did not field a team in the Pecos League in 2013, though they did participate in the Pecos Spring League in March 2013. The team returned to the Pecos League for 2015, and finished the season with an 18–50 record; the team did not return in 2016.

== Year-by-year record ==
Year	Record	Manager
2010	32–15	Bobby Brown
2011	35–32	Miguel Gomez
2012	42–28	Casey Dill
2015	18–50	Darrell Carrillo
