= Taos Blizzard =

- Logo

Information
- League: Pecos League (2013)
- Location: Taos, New Mexico
- Ballpark: The Tundra at Taos
- Founded: 2013
- Colors: blue, white
- Ownership: Pecos League
- Manager: Chris Tuttle
- Website: www.taosblizzard.com

The Taos Blizzard were a professional baseball team based in Taos, New Mexico. The team was a member of the Pecos League, an independent baseball league which is not affiliated with Major or Minor League Baseball. The team played its home games at The Tundra at Taos and began operations for the 2013 season. The team ceased operations following the 2014 season.

== Notable alumni ==
- Eric Yardley (2013)
