= Salina Stockade (baseball) =

- Logo

Information
- League: Pecos League
- Location: Salina, Kansas
- Ballpark: Dean Evans Stadium
- Founded: 2016
- Disbanded: 2021
- Former leagues: American Association; Canadian American Association of Professional Baseball; Pacific Association; Pecos League
- Former ballpark: Sam Lynn Ballpark
- Colors: Navy blue, royal blue, silver, white
- Ownership: Andrew Dunn
- Manager: David Peterson
- Website: www.salinastockade.com

The Salina Stockade were a professional baseball team based in Salina, Kansas that began play in 2016. From 2017-2019 it was a traveling team which competed in various leagues when a league has an uneven number of teams. For the 2020 and 2021 seasons they returned to the Pecos League where they originally played before again leaving for the 2022 season only participating in the spring league.

== History ==
Formed in 2016, the Salina Stockade were originally part of the Pecos League.

In 2017 Salina Stockade joined the American Association of Independent Professional Baseball, which is not affiliated with Major or Minor League Baseball, to replace the Laredo Lemurs, which folded.

The Stockade played the 2017 season as a road franchise, with only sixteen home games at Dean Evans Stadium.

The team played a similar schedule in 2018, traveling to play each of the six teams in the Can-Am League.

In 2019, the Stockade joined The Western League a four-week winter organization, as a charter team. On March 31, 2019 it was announced that they would traveling to play each of the teams in the Pacific Association.

In 2020, the Stockade returned as a member of the Western League, and played games out of Bakersfield, California. It was later announced they'd be activated for the 2020 Pecos League season; the Stockade competed as one of four teams in the Mountain Division for the condensed 60-game season (due to the COVID-19 pandemic). All games were played at Coastal Baseball Park in Houston, Texas. The Stockade lost in the Championship series to the Tucson Saguaros 2 games to 0.

The Pecos League announced in February 2021 that the Stockade would return as a full member following improvements to Dean Evans Stadium, which included installation of artificial turf. However, the franchise did not play any home games in Salina during the 2021 season, instead hosting seven home games at El Dorado's McDonald Stadium and six in Colby.

Following the season, the team was dropped from the Pecos League lineup. The club then competed in the Pecos Spring League (formerly known as the Western League) during the 2022 season, which was hosted at Coastal Baseball Park in Houston, after which the team ceased operations.

== Season-by-season record ==
Salina Stockade
Season	League	Division	Overall	Win %	Finish	Manager	Playoffs
2016	Pecos	North	29–36	.446	4th	Justin Thompson	Did not qualify
2017	AA	South	18–82	.180	4th	JD Droddy (10–49); Daniel Aldrich (7–14); T.J. Zarewocz (1–9)	Did not qualify
2018	CAMA	Guest	3–15	.167	7th	David Peterson	Not eligible
2019	PACA	—	14–50	.219	5th	Chuck Rocker (12–43); Taylor Zeutenhorst (2–7)	Did not qualify
2020	Pecos	—	16–15†	.516	2nd	David Peterson	Won semifinals (Roswell) 1–0; Lost Pecos League championship series (Tucson) 0–2
2021	Pecos	Mountain North	10–41	.196	4th	Tom Fitzpatrick	Did not qualify

† 2020 post-season was also included in regular season record.
