= South Louisiana Pipeliners =

The South Louisiana Pipeliners were a minor-league baseball team based in Morgan City, Louisiana. The team played during the 2009 season in the Continental Baseball League.
