= Whiptail Technologies =

Whiptail Technologies LLC
- Industry: Information technology, data storage
- Founded: 2009
- Founders: Edward Rebholz (CEO); James Candelaria (CTO)
- Fate: Acquired
- Successor: Cisco Systems
- Headquarters: Whippany, New Jersey, U.S.
- Key people: Dan Crain (CEO); James Candelaria (CTO); Aaron 'AJ' Jennings (COO & SVP Corporate Development); Cristobal Conde (chairman)
- Products: ACCELA, INVICTA, INVICTA INFINITY
- Website: www.whiptail.com

Whiptail Technologies LLC was previously a privately held company that builds data storage systems out of solid-state drive components. Whiptail designed and commercialized the use of NAND flash memory as a replacement for hard disk drives in large-scale storage systems. The company is named after the whiptail racerunner, a fast lizard species indigenous to the southwestern United States.

On October 29, 2013, Whiptail was acquired by Cisco Systems for approximately US $415M.

== History ==
Headquartered in Whippany, New Jersey, with offices in San Jose, California, and London, United Kingdom, Whiptail was founded in 2009 by Edward T Rebholz CEO and (now CTO) James Candelaria. Early investors included Ignition Partners, RRE Ventures and Spring Mountain Capital. In January 2012, Series B funding was reported as "more than $10 million." In December 2012, Whiptail announced a $31 million funding round. Ignition Partners led the Series C financing, with SanDisk Ventures joining as the new strategic investor. Existing investors, RRE Ventures and Spring Mountain Capital also participated.

Whiptail released the XLR8r in 2009. In May 2012, Whiptail announced the ACCELA all-flash storage array, and INVICTA, which featured scaling, high-availability, modular and multi-protocol technology.

In November 2012, Whiptail announced INVICTA INFINITY, which they said exceeded 4 million IOPS and 40 GB/second data rate and an upgrade to version 4.1. of the software RACERUNNER, which allows businesses to replicate data to a non-Whiptail target array.

On January 31, 2011, former CTO of Brocade Communications Systems Dan Crain became CEO. On March 12, 2013, former SunGard CEO Cristóbal Conde was named Whiptail Chairman of the Board.

In 2012, Whiptail partnered with Cisco, Citrix, SanDisk, Micron and VMware. Whiptail works with the Cisco VXI (Virtualization Experience Infrastructure) and the UCS (Unified Computing System). INVICTA and ACCELA are verified as Citrix Ready. The Citrix Ready program identifies solutions that are trusted to enhance virtualization, networking and cloud computing solutions from Citrix, including Citrix XenDesktop, XenApp, XenServer, NetScaler and GoToMeeting. In December, 2012, SanDisk announced an investment in Whiptail via SanDisk Ventures, the company’s newly formed strategic investment arm, with Alex Lam joining the company as a Board Observer. Whiptail’s INVICTA and ACCELA storage arrays achieved VMware Ready status.

On September 10, 2013, Cisco announced its intent to acquire Whiptail for $415 million, with a plan to incorporate Whiptail's technology within Cisco UCS fabric offerings at a hardware and manageability level.

On July 24, 2015, Cisco announced the end-of-life (EOL) of Whiptail products, specifically the Invicta Appliance and Scaling System products.

== Products ==
Product specifications:

	ACCELA	INVICTA	INVICTA INFINITY
Application Workloads	1–9	1–60	1–300
Nodes		2–6	7–30
Storage Capacity	1.5–12 TB	6–72 TB	84–360 TB
Performance	250,000 IOPS	650,000 IOPS	800,000 - 4,000,000 IOPS
Bandwidth	1.9 GB/s	7 GB/s	40 GB/s
