= Douglas Diablos =

Defunct pro baseball team in Douglas, Arizona

- Logo

Information
- League: Pecos League
- Location: Douglas, Arizona
- Ballpark: Copper King Stadium
- Founded: 2014
- Disbanded: 2014
- Colors: Red, White, Black
- Manager: Mike Greene
- Website: web.archive.org/web/20140517055117/http://douglasdiablos.com/

The Douglas Diablos were a professional baseball team based in Douglas, Arizona. The team was a member of the Pecos League, an independent baseball league which is not affiliated with Major or Minor League Baseball. They played at Copper King Stadium during the 2014 season and had a 28–36 record. Following the 2014 season in which the team finished in last place, they were immediately dropped by the Pecos League.
