= Warren Ballpark =

Baseball stadium in Bisbee, Arizona, US

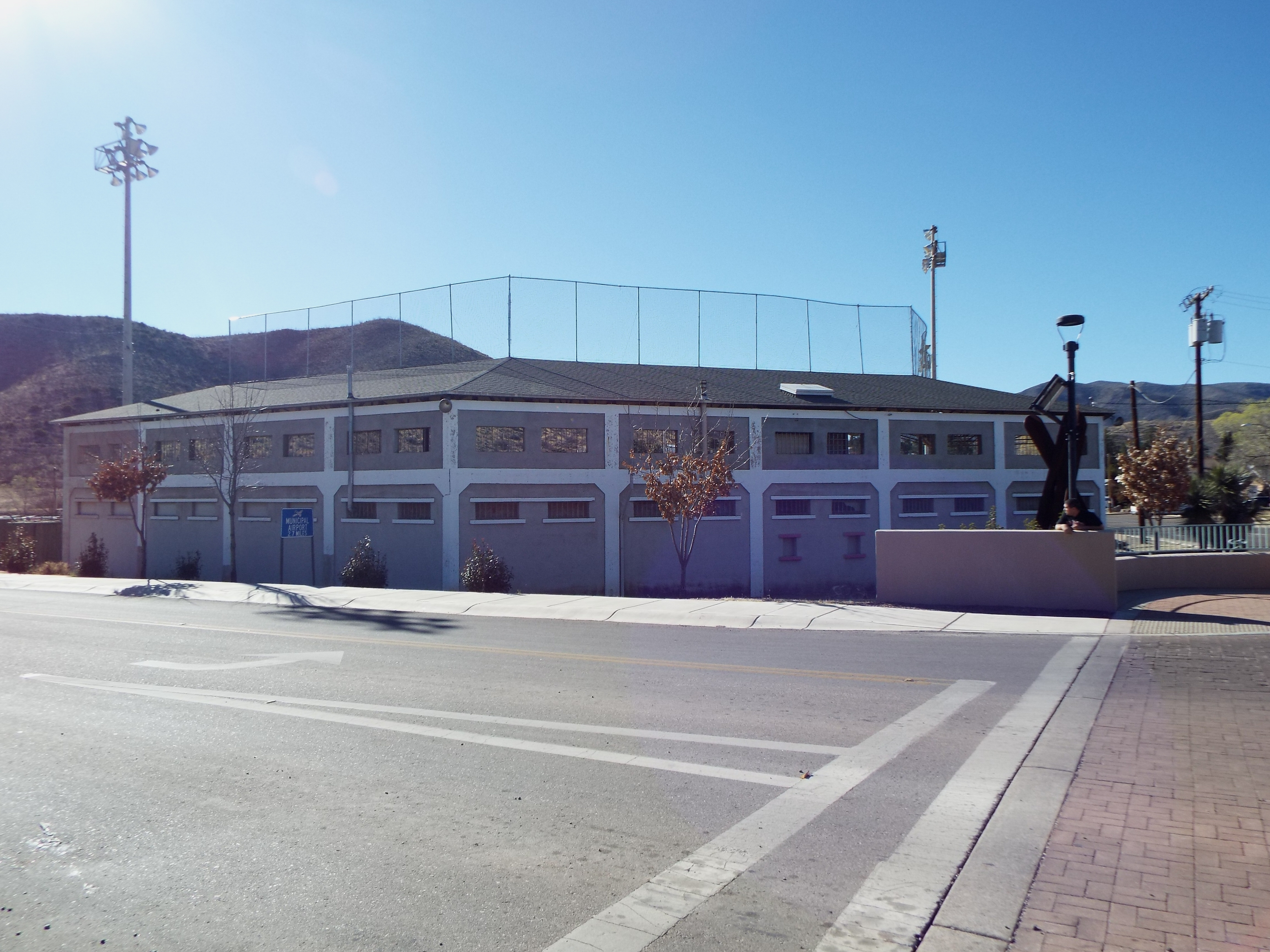
- Historic Warren Ballpark built in 1909
- Interactive map of Warren Ballpark
- Location: Bisbee, Arizona
- Coordinates: 31°24′38″N 109°52′47″W

Construction
- Built: 1909
- Renovated: 1930
- Cost: $3,600
- General contractor: The Warren Company

Tenants
- Bisbee-Douglas Copper Kings (AML) (1947–1958, 2003), Bisbee Killer Termites 2015 - current

Warren Ballpark is a baseball stadium located in Bisbee, Arizona. The ballpark was recently home to the Tucson Saguaros of the Pecos League and the Bisbee-Douglas Copper Kings of the independent Arizona–Mexico League The Stadium was built in 1909 by the Calumet and Arizona Mining Company (which later merged with Phelps Dodge) as a recreation for the miners and their families, pre-dating the construction of Chicago's Wrigley Field by nearly five years. It is currently the home of Bisbee Killer Termites and Bisbee High School Pumas baseball and football teams.

The ballpark spans approximately forty acres, and is surrounded by an 8-foot (2.4 m) tall wooden security fence. It is divided into two sections: a baseball field on the East side, and a football stadium on the West. The baseball field features a shaded cast-in-place concrete grandstand situated at the Northeast corner. This canopy-covered structure, built in 1909, is still in its original condition, and is listed as a state historic building. Despite ongoing maintenance by the City of Bisbee and the Bisbee Unified School districts, it will most likely need structural renovation at some point in the future. Underneath the grandstand are housed the concrete dugouts, locker rooms, showers and manager's offices. The football field is oriented North to South and consists of a gridiron with modern steel bleachers along both sides of its length. These bleachers have at times in the past been pushed back to expand the baseball outfield.

Warren Ballpark holds a place in American labor history as the location where 1,300 striking, kidnapped miners were held during the Bisbee Deportation in 1917.

== Gallery ==
Historic Warren Ballpark in Bisbee, Arizona

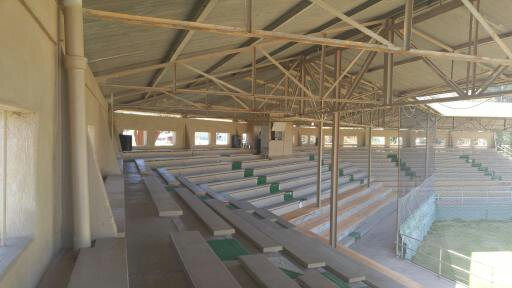
View from the Grandstand

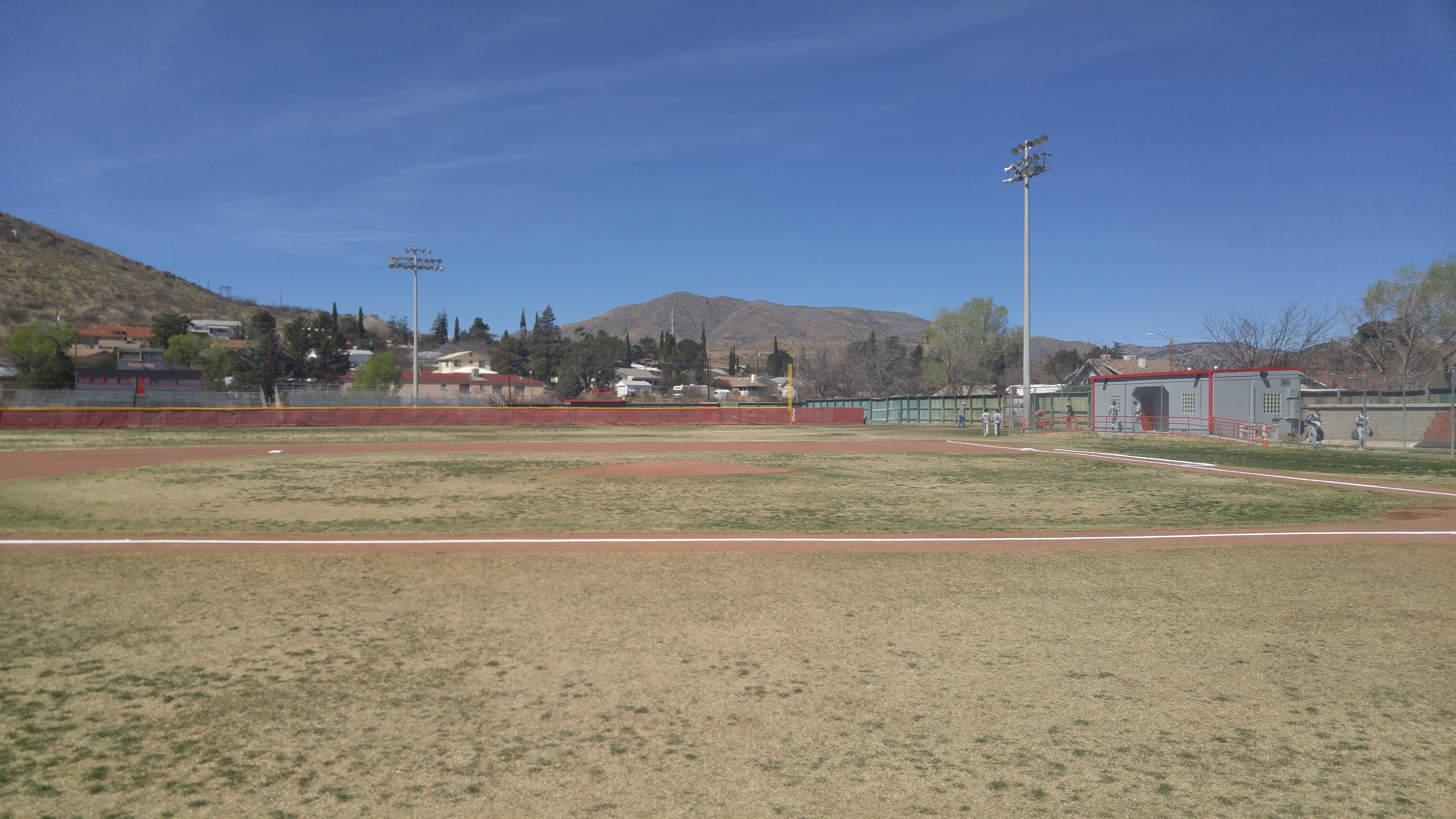
View from the Home Dugout

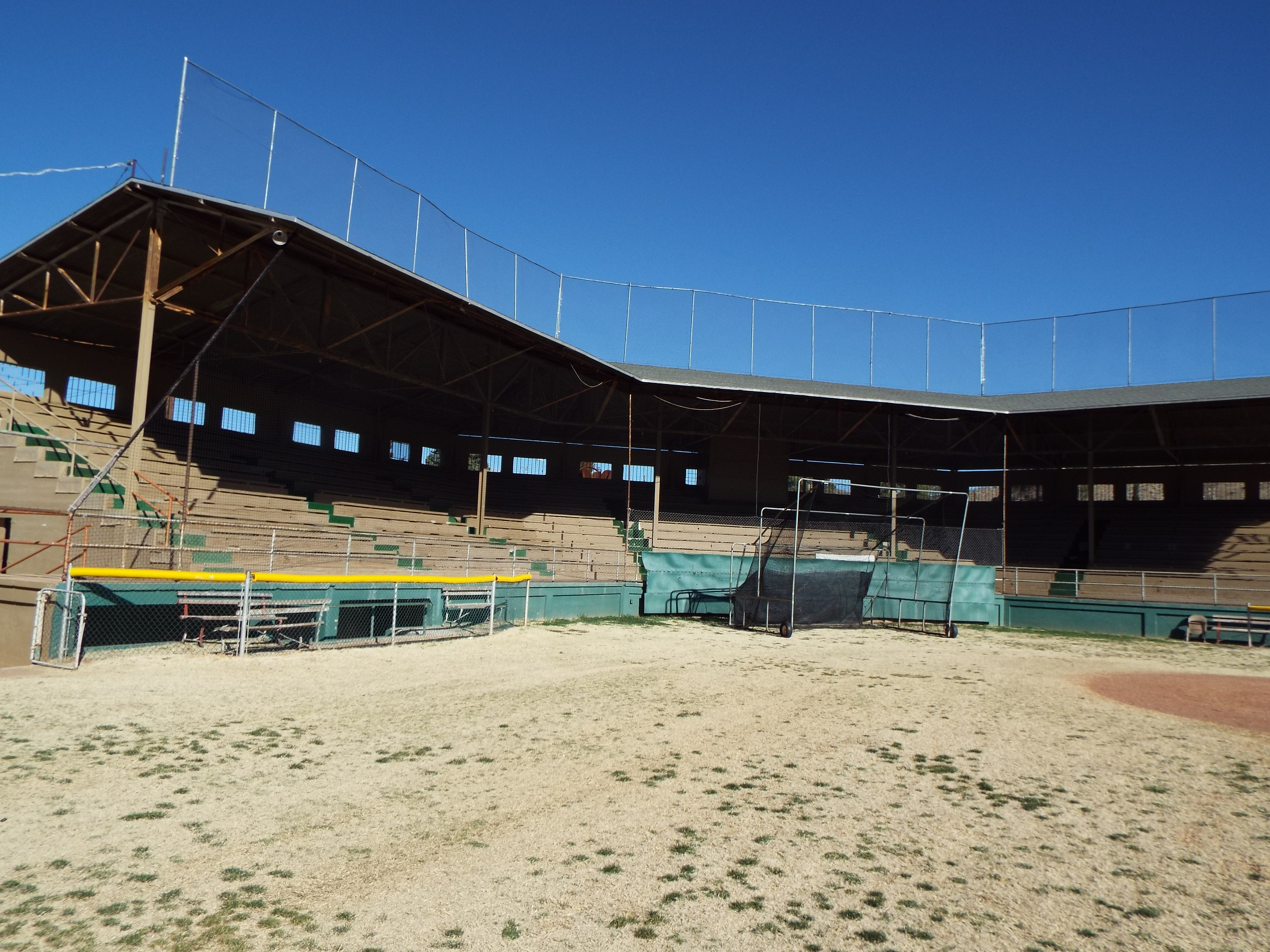
The concrete grandstand of the Warren Ballpark which was built in 1909 and is located in the corner of Arizona Street and Ruppe Road in Bisbee, Az. The Warren Ballpark is one of the oldest professional baseball stadiums in the United States. It has hosted baseball Hall of Famers John McGraw, Connie Mack and Honus Wagner and also some of the members of the Chicago White Sox involved in the 1919 Black Sox Scandal, such as Hal Chase, Chick Gandil and Buck Weaver. The ballpark was listed in the National Register of Historic Places on October 15, 2010 as part of the Bisbee Residential Historic District, reference #10000233.

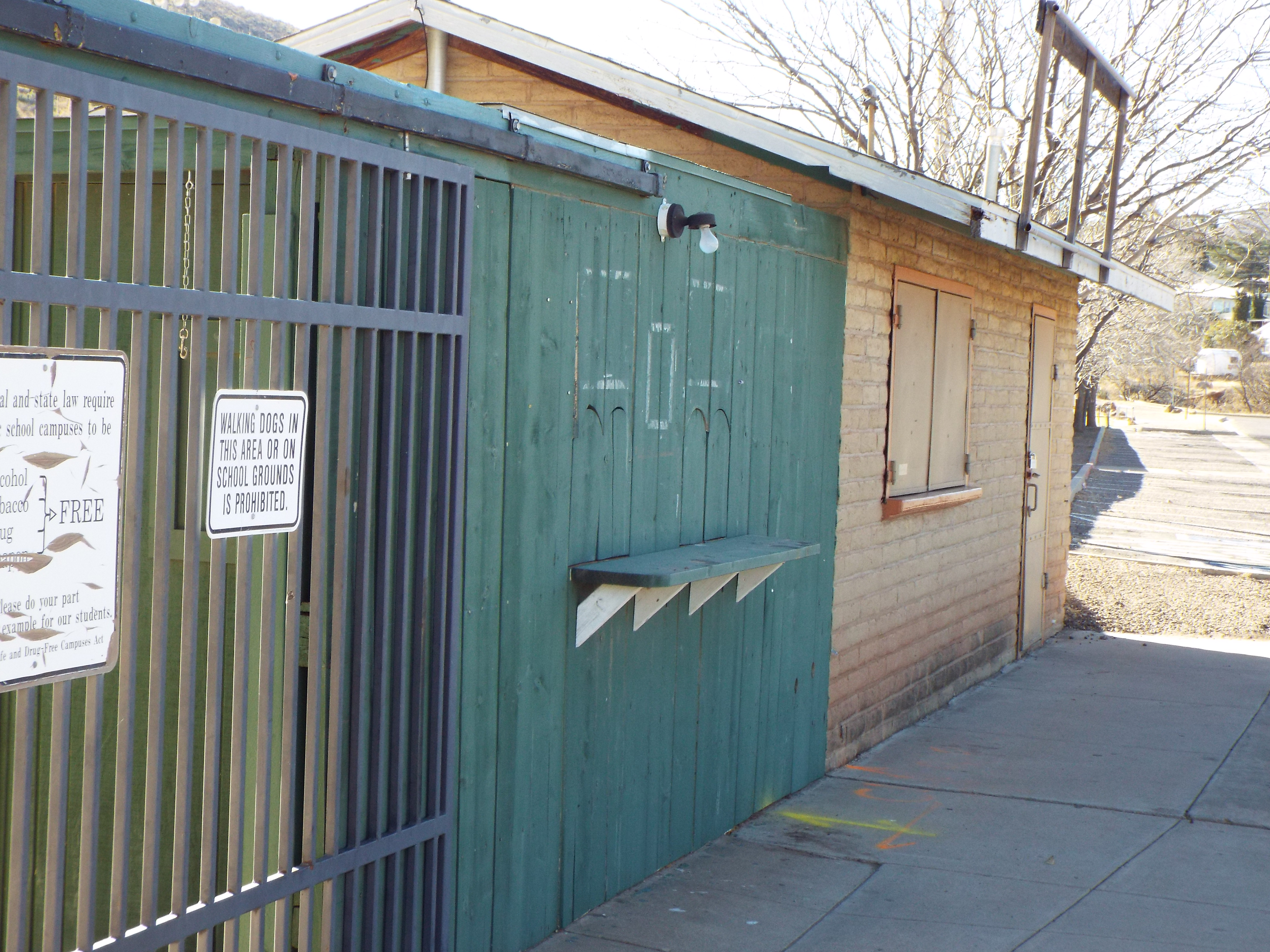
The original ticket booth made of wood of the Warren Ballpark.

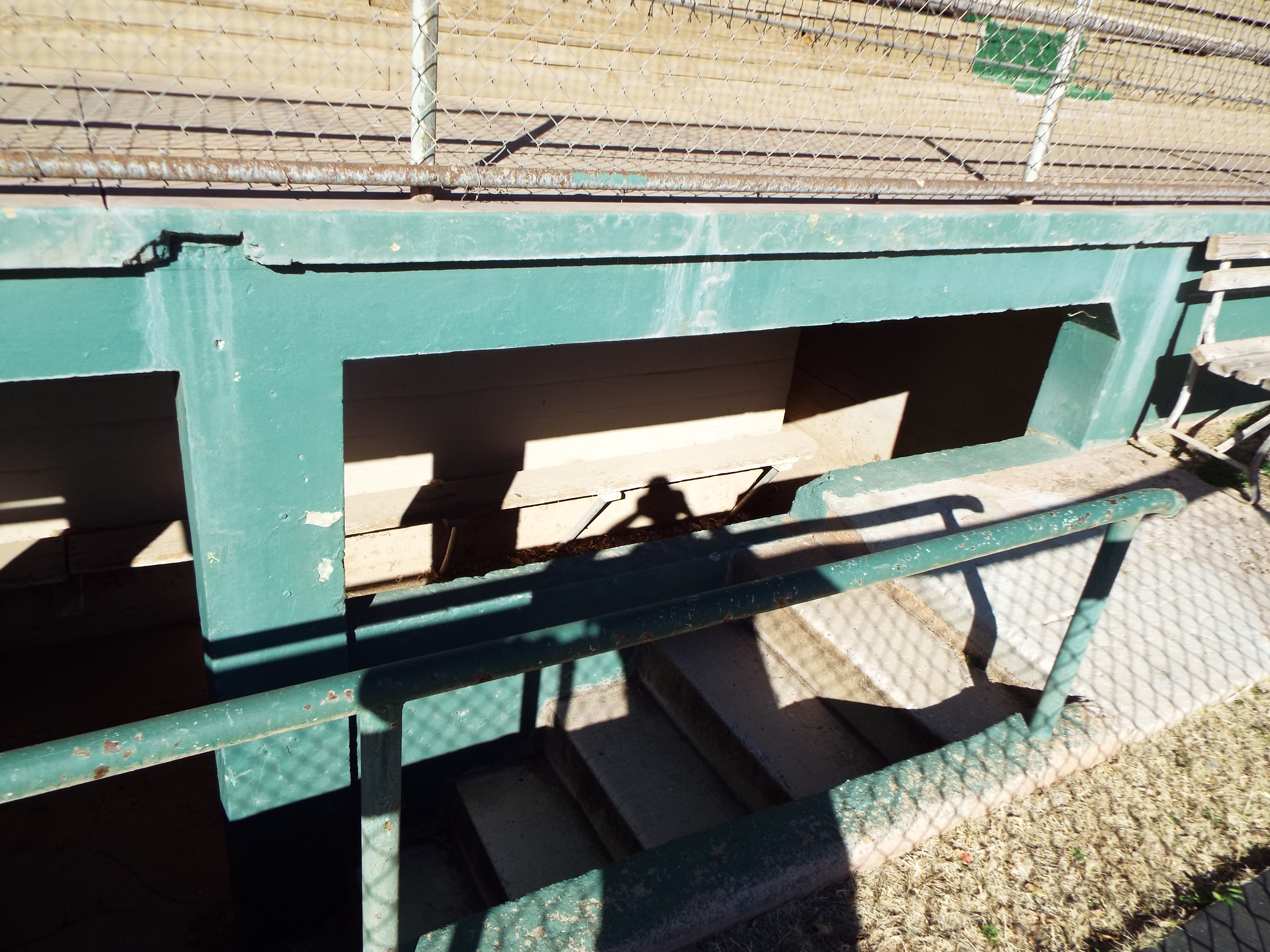
Underneath the grandstand of the Warren Ballpark are housed the concrete dugouts, locker rooms, showers and manager’s office.

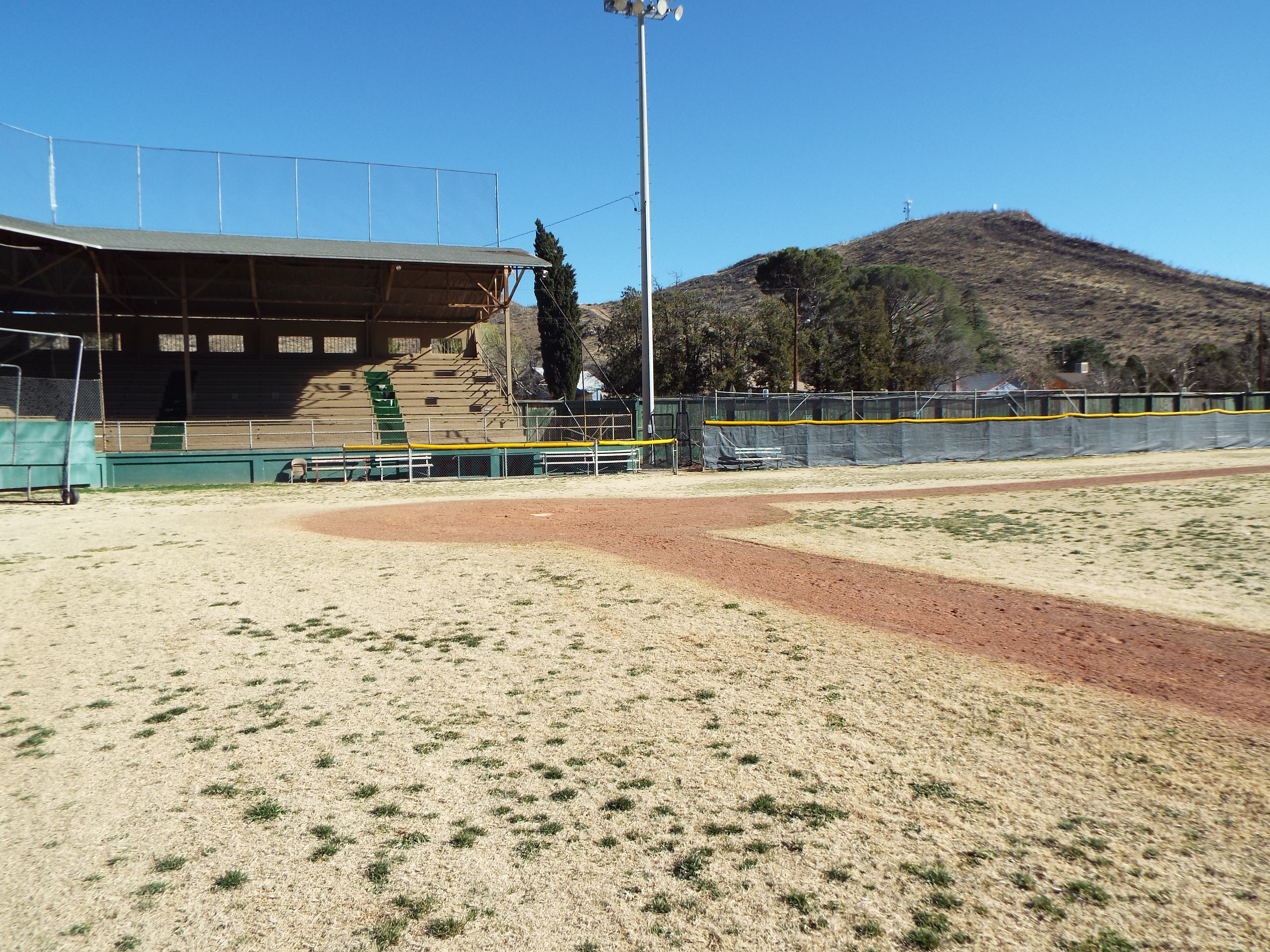
View of the concrete grandstand and home plate in the field of the Warren Ballpark.

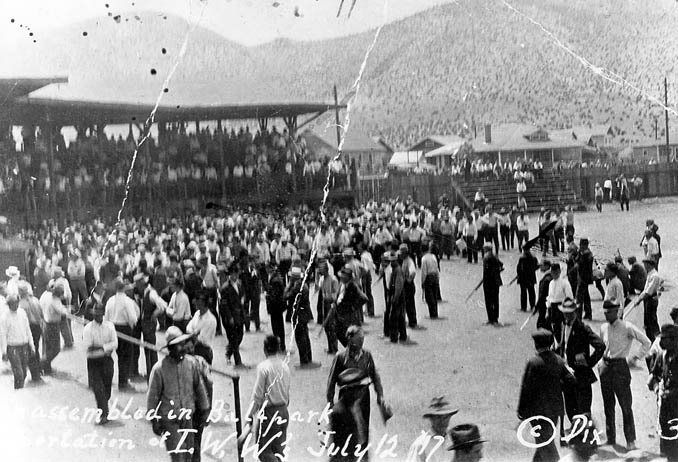
Deportation of striking miners from Bisbee, Arizona, on July 12, 1917. The miners and others who have been rounded up are assembled at Warren Ballpark and are sitting in the bleachers while armed members of the posse stand in the infield.
