= White Sands Pupfish =

- Logo

Information
- Location: Alamogordo, New Mexico
- Ballpark: Jim Griggs Field
- Founded: 2009
- Folded: 2019
- Former name: Coastal Kingfish (2009–10)
- Former leagues: Pecos League (2011–2019); Continental Baseball League (2009–10)
- Colors: Vegas gold, black, white
- Ownership: Andrew Dunn/Coastal Baseball LLC
- Media: Alamogordo Daily News
- Website: whitesandspupfish.com

The White Sands Pupfish were a professional baseball team based in Alamogordo, New Mexico. The team was a member of the Pecos League, an independent baseball league which is not affiliated with Major or Minor League Baseball. They were originally known as the Coastal Kingfish and played in the Continental Baseball League.

For the 2009 season, the Kingfish were a travel team without a home ballpark. In early April 2010, the Coastal Kingfish replaced the West Texas Road Hogs as the CBL travel team. The Kingfish joined the Pecos League in 2011 as the White Sands Pupfish, and relocated to Alamogordo, New Mexico.

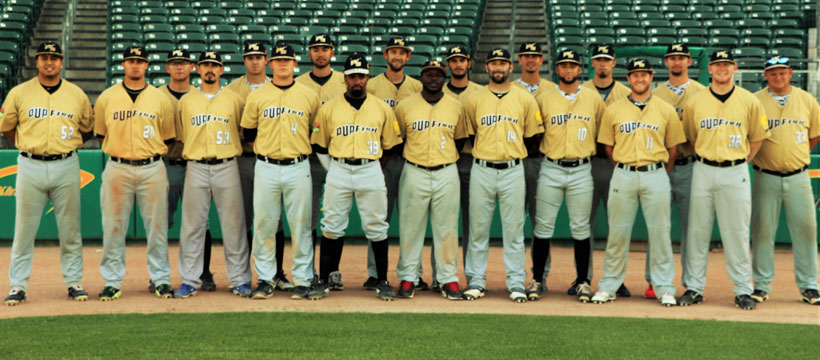
2016 Pupfish

== Team record ==
- 2011 41-29
- 2012 27-42
- 2013 26-43
- 2014 28-33
- 2015 37-28
- 2016 28-39
- 2017 13-50
- 2018 7-51
- 2019 8-49

== Single-season records ==
=== Individual ===
==== Batting ====
- Games: Eric Kalbfliesh, 66 (2016)
- Batting Average: Ernie Munoz, .427 (2011)
- At Bats: Cody Collins, 276 (2013)
- Hits: Eric Kalbfliesh, 115 (2016)
- Runs: Austin Newell, 78 (2012)
- Doubles: Cody Collins, 24 (2013)
- Triples: Aaron Olivas, Aaron Nardone, 8 (2015)
- Home Runs: Henry Gonzalez Jr., 17 (2012)
- RBI: TJ Wharton, 67 (2016)
- Walks: Brandon Torres, 46 (2017, 2018)
- Strikeouts: Robert Rodriguez, 74 (2011)
- Stolen Bases: Dabal Baez, 21 (2016)
- Caught Stealing: Aaron Olivas, 7 (2015)

==== Pitching ====
- Wins: Cameron Powers, 8 (2015)
- Loses: Joseph Johnson, 9 (2018)
- Saves: Garrett McKenzie, 5 (2017)
- Games Started: Anthony Pastrana, Nick Bozeman, 14 (2016)
- Games: Chris Stout, 40 (2016)
- Innings Pitched: Eric Zagar, 76.2 (2013)
- Hits Allowed: Cameron Powers, 107 (2015)
- Runs Allowed: Joseph Johnson, 100 (2018)
- Earned Runs Allowed: Joseph Johnson, 80 (2018)
- Strikeouts: Anthony Pastrana, 82 (2016)
- Walks Allowed: Joseph Johnson, 53 (2018)

=== Single season team records ===
- Wins: 41 (2011)
- Loses: 51 (2018)

== Managers ==
1. Keith Essary, 2011 (41-29)
2. Mickey Speaks, 2015-2016 (65-67). Winningest manager all-time.
3. Chris Stout, 2016-2017
4. Cameron Haskins, 2018
5. Matt Chambers, 2019

== Notable alumni ==
- Yermín Mercedes (2014)
- Chris Smith (2011)
