= California City Whiptails =

Former American baseball team

- Logo

Information
- Location: California City, California
- Ballpark: Balsitis Park (Capacity: 150)
- Founded: 2016
- Folded: 2019
- Former league: Pecos League (2017–19)
- Colors: Navy blue, blue, silver, white
- Ownership: Pecos League

The California City Whiptails were a professional baseball team based in California City, California that began play in 2017. They were a member of the Pecos League, an independent baseball league which is not affiliated with MLB or Minor League Baseball.

The Whiptails played in the Pecos League from 2017 to 2019, and folded following the 2019 season. The team was originally planned to return in 2021, however, due to the Pecos League revising the divisions, the team did not return.
