= Continental Baseball League =

- Continental Baseball League logo
- Sport: Baseball
- Founded: 2006
- Folded: 2010
- No. of teams: 4
- Country: United States
- Website: www.cblproball.com

The Continental Baseball League, based in Addison, Texas, was an independent minor league professional baseball league that operated for four seasons, from 2007 to 2010. The league conceived as a professional, independent baseball organization operating in the U.S. states of New Mexico, Louisiana and Texas in cities not served by Major League Baseball or Minor League Baseball teams nor affiliated with either. The league was founded by Ron Baron and former major leaguer Jay Johnstone.

After a shortened 2010 season, the Continental Baseball League ceased operations after the league championship was played on July 31. Some of the teams which played in the 2010 season moved to the Pecos League in 2011.

== 2010 Season Overview ==
=== Standings ===
Final regular season standings for 2010:

Team	Games	Wins	Losses	PCT	GB
*Big Bend Cowboys	48	33	15	.687	0
Las Cruces Vaqueros	49	33	16	.673	0.5
Coastal Kingfish	51	11	40	.215	23.5
Desert Valley Mountain Lions	52	26	26	.500	9.0

- - CBL Champions

== 2009 Season Overview ==
=== Standings ===
Final regular season standings for 2009:

Team	Games	Wins	Losses	PCT	GB
Bay Area Toros	56	38	18	.679	-
Texarkana Gunslingers	58	38	20	.655	1.0
*Alexandria Aces	60	39	21	.650	1.0
Big Bend Cowboys	59	35	24	.593	4.5
South Louisiana Pipeliners	57	16	41	.281	22.5
Coastal Kingfish	58	8	50	.138	31.0

- - CBL Champions

== 2008 Season Overview ==
=== Standings ===
Final regular-season standings for 2008

Team	Games	Wins	Losses	PCT	GB
*Bay Area Toros	73	44	29	.603	-
Texarkana Gunslingers	72	38	34	.528	5.5
Corpus Christi Beach Dawgs	72	34	38	.472	9.5
McKinney Blue Thunder	73	29	44	.397	15

- - CBL Champions

== 2007 Season Review ==
=== Standings ===
Final regular-season standings for 2007

Team	Wins	Losses	PCT
*Tarrant County Blue Thunder	30	17	.638
Texas Heat	25	17	.595
Lewisville Lizards	19	25	.432
Bay Area Toros	13	28	.317

- - CBL Champions

== Expansion ==
Year	# of Teams	Expansion Teams	Folded Teams	Suspended Teams	Returning Teams	Relocated Teams	Name Changes
2007	4	Bay Area Toros; Lewisville Lizards; Tarrant County Blue Thunder; Texas Heat				Tarrant County → McKinney Blue Thunder	
2008	4	Texarkana Gunslingers	Lewisville Lizards		Bay Area Toros	Texas → Corpus Christi Beach Dawgs; McKinney → Dallas Aviators; Dallas → Coastal Kingfish	
2009	6	Alexandria Aces; Coastal Kingfish; Big Bend Cowboys; South Louisiana Pipeliners	Corpus Christi Beach Dawgs; McKinney Blue Thunder		Bay Area Toros; Texarkana Gunslingers		
2010	4	Las Cruces Vaqueros; Desert Valley Mountain Lions	Texarkana Gunslingers; South Louisiana Pipeliners	Bay Area Toros	Big Bend Cowboys; Coastal Kingfish		
