= Pecos League =

US professional baseball league

- Current season, competition or edition: 2025 Pecos League season
- Classification: Independent
- Sport: Baseball
- Founded: 2010
- Founder: Andrew Dunn
- First season: 2011
- Owner: Andrew Dunn
- CEO: Andrew Dunn
- Commissioner: Andrew Dunn
- Divisions: 2
- No. of teams: 15
- Country: United States
- Headquarters: Houston, Texas
- Continent: North America
- Most recent champion: Garden City Wind (2026)
- Most titles: Roswell Invaders (4), Tucson Saguaros (4)
- Streaming partner: Vimeo
- Website: pecosleague.com

The Pecos League of Professional Baseball Clubs is an independent professional baseball league headquartered in Houston, which operates in cities in desert mountain regions throughout California, New Mexico, Arizona, Colorado, Kansas, Oklahoma, Missouri, and Texas. The league plays in cities that do not have Major League Baseball or Minor League Baseball teams and is not affiliated with either.

The Pecos League season is highly condensed. Schedules vary, but teams have played as many as 70 games in 72 days, or 80 games in three months. In recent seasons the schedule has been reduced down to about 50 games, with the regular season starting in late May and running through July. Playoff series are 3 games.

The Pecos League operates a separate pay-to-play winter league called The Western League for players who are free agents or not currently in college programs.

== History ==
The Pecos League operated six teams in the 2011 and 2012 seasons and expanded to eight teams for 2013. Continued growth saw the league reach a high of 10 teams for 2014.

The Pecos League also operates a spring developmental league, which is a one-month showcase beginning in March for recent college graduates and free agents looking to catch on to a full season league.

In May 2014, Fox Sports 1 aired a six-part documentary about life in the Pecos League, mostly based on the Trinidad Triggers.

In August 2014, Jon Edwards made his major league debut with the Texas Rangers becoming the first player in Pecos League history to play in Major League Baseball.

In September 2016, Chris Smith was called up to the Toronto Blue Jays becoming the second player from the Pecos League to make a major league roster, though he did not appear in a game that season. Smith would eventually make his debut for the Blue Jays on June 27, 2017, against the Baltimore Orioles.

For 2016, the Las Vegas Train Robbers moved to Topeka, Kansas. Expansion teams were added in Great Bend, Kansas and Tucson, Arizona.

On February 25, 2016 it was announced that the Las Cruces Vaqueros would sit out the 2016 season due to severe damage to their home stadium. Expansion team Salina Stockade was added to the league and played a limited 11-game home schedule in 2016.

Following the 2016 season, a drastic shift in the Pecos League landscape occurred as two Kansas teams, the Salina Stockade and Great Bend Boom, both folded, while a third, the Topeka Train Robbers, moved to Bakersfield, California, taking the place of the former Bakersfield Blaze, who folded following the 2016 California League season.

The Train Robbers were joined in California for 2017 by three expansion teams: the High Desert Yardbirds (replacing the California League's High Desert Mavericks), the Monterey Amberjacks, and California City Whiptails. The league also announced a travel team, the Hollywood Stars, who played a handful of home games in Los Angeles.

For 2019, the Ruidoso Osos were replaced by the Wasco Reserves, and the league reduced the number of divisions from three to two.

For 2020, the Martinez Sturgeon and Santa Cruz Seaweed were announced as expansion teams, and the San Rafael Pacifics were added from the Pacific Association. They joined the all-California Pacific Division, and replaced the California City Whiptails and High Desert Yardbirds in the circuit. The Tucson Saguaros moved to the Mountain Division, taking the place of the White Sands Pupfish. Interdivisional games would not be played to cut down on travel and other expenses. Later, due to the COVID-19 pandemic, the league announced that the Mountain Division teams would not play at their home stadiums, and that 4 of the 6 teams would play a condensed 36-game season beginning on July 1, 2020. All games were played at Coastal Baseball Park in Houston, Texas. The Pacific Division originally planned on enacting a similar format, but due to the ongoing pandemic, were unable to compete in 2020.

For the 2021 season, the Salina Stockade returned and the league announced the addition of the Colorado Springs Snow Sox as an expansion team. On April 4, the league announced its final division alignment for the season, which did not include California City and High Desert after previously indicating each would return. On August 3, the league announced the Bay Series between the San Rafael Pacifics, Monterey Amberjacks, Martinez Sturgeon, and Santa Cruz Seaweed after the Bakersfield Train Robbers tested positive for COVID-19 and had to cancel their final home series. The Pecos League operated the Houston Apollos in the American Association as a travel team.

In April 2021, Yermín Mercedes was called up to the Chicago White Sox where he set a major league record as the first baseball player in modern MLB history to begin a season with eight consecutive hits.

For the 2022 season, the league announced three expansion franchises: the Santa Rosa Scuba Divers, Austin Weirdos, and Weimar Hormigas. After competing in 2021, Salina was not included as a member club in 2022.

Before 2023, the league introduced 4 new teams; the Lancaster Sound Breakers, Marysville Drakes, Blackwell Fly Catchers, and Dublin Leprechauns. The Weimar Hormigas, Colorado Springs Snow Sox, Wasco Reserve, and Santa Rosa Scuba Divers folded. Tucson moved back to the Mountain Division, while the Santa Cruz Seaweed moved to Vallejo, California.

For the 2024 season, the Lancaster Sound Breakers and Monterey Amberjacks did not return. The Sound Breakers folded due to the city of Lancaster entering into a lease with a soccer organization to use The Hangar, leaving the Sound Breakers without a stadium. The City of Monterey reportedly did not renew its contract with the league, but the Amberjacks plan to return in 2025.

To replace the Sound Breakers and Amberjacks, the league brought in two new teams for the season, the North Platte 80s and the Pecos Bills. Both of which are the first time that each city has had a team in the league.

Before the 2025 season, the Amberjacks made a return while Marysville folded. A new expansion team, the Kansas City Hormigas was announced. The Santa Rosa Scuba Divers returned with the relocation of the Vallejo Seaweed, but it was short lived as they moved back to Vallejo to play as the Seaweed in June, 2025.

The league split the Mountain Division into a Mountain North and Mountain South prior to the 2025 season.

In 2026 the Kansas City Hormigas, Monterey Amberjacks and Vallejo Seaweed did not return. The Austin Weirdos returned to compete as a travel team in the Pacific division. The Grand Junction Razorback Suckers joined the Mountain North division as an expansion team.

== Current teams ==
Pecos League
Division	Team	Founded	City	Stadium	Capacity
Mountain North	Blackwell FlyCatchers	2023	Blackwell, Oklahoma	Morgan Field	1,500
Mountain North	Garden City Wind	2015	Garden City, Kansas	Clint Lightner Field	1,000
Mountain North	Grand Junction Razorback Suckers	2026	Grand Junction, Colorado	Sam Suplizio Field	10,000
Mountain North	North Platte 80s	2023	North Platte, Nebraska	Bill Wood Field	1,500
Mountain North	Trinidad Triggers	2012	Trinidad, Colorado	Central Park	887
Mountain South	Alpine Cowboys	2009	Alpine, Texas	Kokernot Field	1,400
Mountain South	Pecos Bills	2023	Pecos, Texas	Cyclone Ballpark	9,500
Mountain South	Roswell Invaders	2011	Roswell, New Mexico	Joe Bauman Stadium	500
Mountain South	Santa Fe Fuego	2012	Santa Fe, New Mexico	Fort Marcy Ballfield	1,100
Mountain South	Tucson Saguaros	2016	Tucson, Arizona	Kino Sports Complex	11,000
Pacific
Pacific	Bakersfield Train Robbers	2013	Bakersfield, California	Sam Lynn Ballpark	2,700
Pacific	Dublin Leprechauns	2023	Dublin, California	Fallon Sports Park	250
Pacific	Martinez Sturgeon	2020	Martinez, California	Waterfront Park	200
Pacific	San Rafael Pacifics	2020	San Rafael, California	Albert Park	1,200

=== Map of teams ===
Current team locations:
Mountain Division
Pacific Division

== Former teams ==
Team	Season(s)	Location	Homefield
Carlsbad Bats	2011	Carlsbad, New Mexico	Traveling team
Bisbee Blue	2014	Bisbee, Arizona	Warren Ballpark
Douglas Diablos	2014	Douglas, Arizona	Copper King Park
Raton Osos	2013–2014	Raton, New Mexico	Gabrielle Park
Taos Blizzard	2013–2014	Taos, New Mexico	The Tundra
Las Cruces Vaqueros	2010–2012, 2015	Las Cruces, New Mexico	Apodaca Park
Las Vegas Train Robbers	2013–2015	Las Vegas, New Mexico	Rodriguez Park
Great Bend Boom	2016	Great Bend, Kansas	Al Burns Memorial Field
Topeka Train Robbers	2016	Topeka, Kansas	Lake Shawnee Park
Ruidoso Osos	2011, 2018	Ruidoso, New Mexico	White Mountain Park
California City Whiptails	2017–2019	California City, California	Balsitis Park
High Desert Yardbirds	2017–2019	Adelanto, California	Adelanto Stadium
White Sands Pupfish	2009–2019	Alamogordo, New Mexico	Jim Griggs Park
Houston Apollos	2012–2020	Houston, Texas	Traveling team
Salina Stockade	2016, 2020–2021	Salina, Kansas	Dean Evans Stadium
Colorado Springs Snow Sox	2021–2022	Colorado Springs, Colorado	Spurgeon Field
Weimar Hormigas	2022	Weimar, Texas	Veterans Park
Wasco Reserve	2019, 2021–2022	Wasco, California, Bakersfield, California	Wasco Ballpark, Sam Lynn Ballpark
Santa Rosa Scuba Divers	2022	Santa Rosa, California	Doyle Park
Lancaster Sound Breakers	2023	Lancaster, California	The Hangar
Marysville Drakes	2023-2024	Marysville, California	Bryant Field
Austin Weirdos	2022-2024 2026	Austin, Texas	Travel Team

== Proposed teams that never played ==
A high number of Pecos League teams postponed their premiere seasons before they were slated to play, like the River Island Islanders in Lathrop California, Pueblo Diablos (Bighorns) in Colorado, Maricopa Monsoon and Nogales Sonorans or Skeletons in Arizona.

Team	Season Proposed	Location	Homefield
Pittsburg Anchors	2020	Pittsburg, California	Central Park Field
Pecos Bills	2013	Reeves County, Texas	Martinez Field
Atascadero 101s	2020	Atascadero, California	Alvord Field (Proposed)
Clovis Pioneers	2012	Clovis, New Mexico	Mike Harris Park
Del Rio Aviators/Gunslingers	2011	Del Rio, Texas	Bank and Trust Rams Field at Roosevelt Park
Lubbock Hubbers	2011	Lubbock, Texas	Lubbock City Park
Amarillo Lone Stars	2016	Amarillo, Texas	Potter County Memorial Stadium

== League timeline ==
League members Former Team Other League

== Champions ==
Season	Winner	Runner-up	Result
2011	Roswell Invaders	Ruidoso Osos	2–1 (best-of-3)
2012	Alpine Cowboys	Las Cruces Vaqueros	2–1 (best-of-3)
2013	Roswell Invaders	Las Vegas Train Robbers	2–0 (best-of-3)
2014	Santa Fe Fuego	Alpine Cowboys	2–1 (best-of-3)
2015	Roswell Invaders	Santa Fe Fuego	2–0 (best-of-3)
2016	Tucson Saguaros	Trinidad Triggers	2–0 (best-of-3)
2017	High Desert Yardbirds	Roswell Invaders	2–0 (best-of-3)
2018	Bakersfield Train Robbers	Alpine Cowboys	2–1 (best-of-3)
2019	Alpine Cowboys	Bakersfield Train Robbers	2–0 (best-of-3)
2020	Tucson Saguaros	Salina Stockade	2–0 (best-of-3)
2021	Tucson Saguaros	Roswell Invaders	2–1 (best-of-3)
2022	Roswell Invaders	Tucson Saguaros	2–1 (best-of-3)
2023	San Rafael Pacifics	Tucson Saguaros	2-1 (best-of-3)
2024	Alpine Cowboys	San Rafael Pacifics	2-0 (best-of-3)
2025	Tucson Saguaros	San Rafael Pacifics	2-1 (best-of-3)
2026	Garden City Wind	Martinez Sturgeon	2-0 (best-of-3)

=== Guest League Participation ===
Between 2017 and 2021, several Pecos League teams competed as guest or traveling teams in other independent leagues. In 2017, the Salina Stockade joined the American Association as a traveling team for a full season. In 2018, both the Stockade and the Hollywood Stars participated as guest teams in the Can-Am League, playing 18 and 9 games, respectively. The Stockade again competed outside the Pecos League in 2019, playing 64 games in the Pacific Association. Most recently, the Houston Apollos joined the American Association as a traveling team in 2021, completing a full-season schedule.

Season	League	Team	Division	Regular season			Postseason results
Season	League	Team	Division	Finish	Wins	Losses	Postseason results
2017	AA	Salina Stockade	South	4th	18	82	Did not qualify
2018	CAL	Salina Stockade	Guest	7th	3	15	Not eligible
2018	CAL	Hollywood Stars	Guest	8th	1	8	Not eligible
2019	PA	Salina Stockade		5th	14	50	Did not qualify
2021	AA	Houston Apollos	South	6th	17	83	Did not qualify
Pecos League totals					53	238	
