= Adelanto, California =

City in California, United States

- City
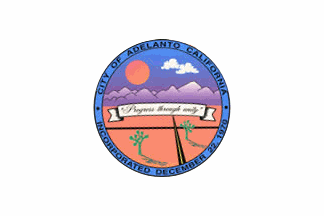
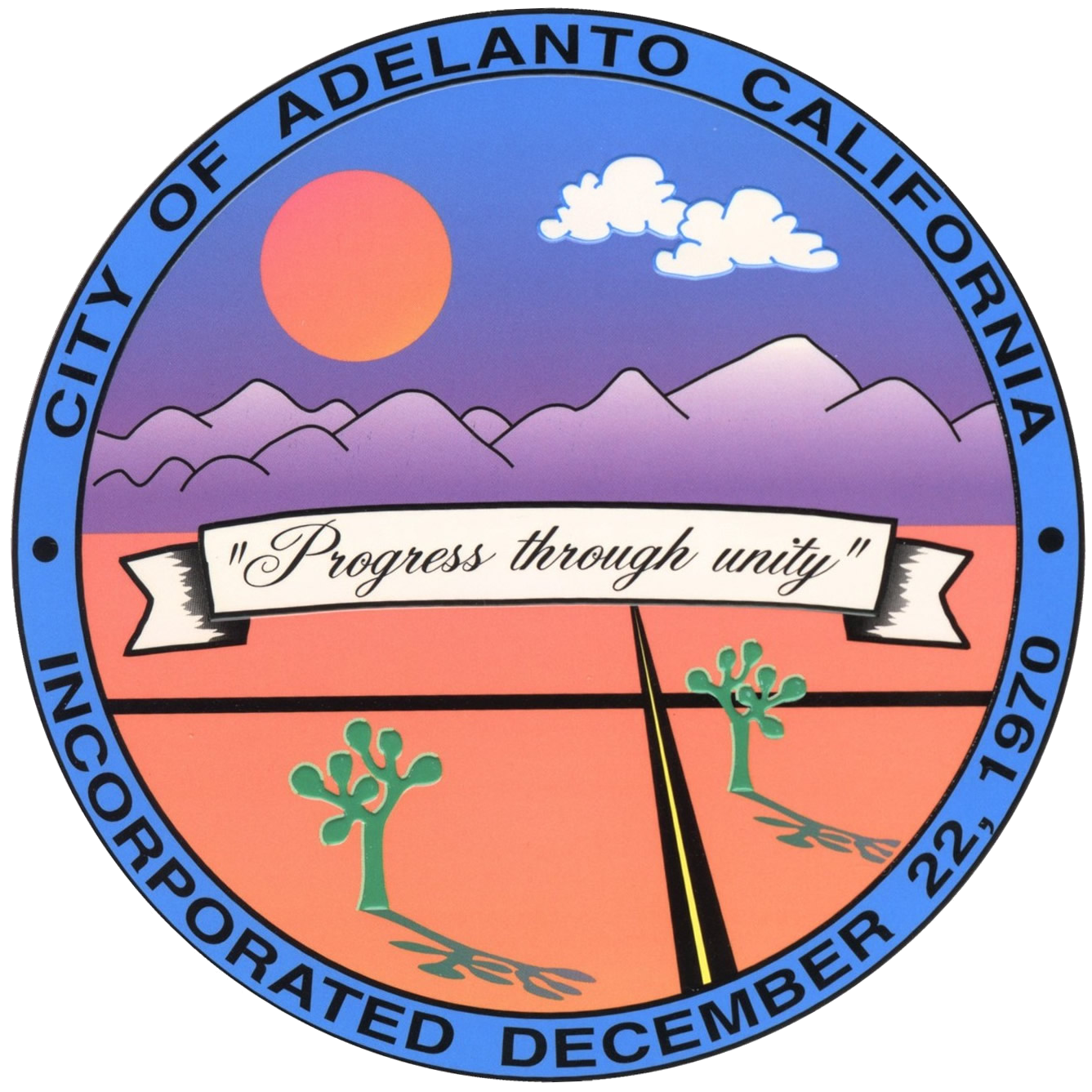
- Flag Seal
- Motto: The City with Unlimited Possibilities
- Interactive map of Adelanto, California
- Location in California Adelanto, California (California) Adelanto, California (the United States)
- Coordinates: 34°35′50″N 117°25′58″W
- Country: United States
- State: California
- County: San Bernardino
- Incorporated: December 22, 1970
- Named for: Spanish for "advance" or "progress"

Government
  - Mayor: Gabriel Reyes

Area
  - Total: 52.88 sq mi (136.97 km^{2})
  - Land: 52.87 sq mi (136.92 km^{2})
  - Water: 0.015 sq mi (0.04 km^{2}) 0.03%
- Elevation: 2,868 ft (874 m)

Population (2020)
  - Total: 38,046
  - Density: 719.7/sq mi (277.86/km^{2})
- Time zone: UTC-8 (PST)
  - Summer (DST): UTC-7 (PDT)
- ZIP code: 92301
- Area codes: 442/760
- FIPS code: 06-00296
- GNIS feature ID: 2409663
- Website: adelantoca.gov

Adelanto (Spanish for "Advance") is a city in San Bernardino County, California, United States. It is approximately 9 miles (14 km) northwest of Victorville in the Victor Valley area of the Mojave Desert, in the northern region of the Inland Empire. The population was 38,046 at the 2020 census. The Adelanto City motto is "The City with Unlimited Possibilities"

== History ==
The area was originally inhabited by the Serrano Native American tribe.

Adelanto was founded in 1915 by E. H. Richardson, the inventor of what became the Hotpoint electric iron. He sold his patent and purchased land for $75,000. He had planned to develop one of the first planned communities in Southern California.

The name Adelanto means 'progress' or 'advance' in Spanish, and was first given to the post office that was established on the site in 1917.

Acres of deciduous fruit trees once grew in the city, which became known in the state for its fresh fruit and cider. The orchards thrived until the Great Depression, when they were replaced by poultry ranches. As the wartime emergency developed early in 1941, the Victorville Army Air Field was established with land within the Adelanto sphere of influence. In September 1950, the airfield was named George Air Force Base in honor of the late Brigadier General Harold H. George.

Adelanto continued as a "community services district" until 1970 when the city incorporated, and Adelanto became San Bernardino County's then smallest city. The city became a charter city in November 1992.

Adelanto had a card room called the Hi Desert Casino which operated from 1975 to 1997. The casino was located across from city hall at the corner of Air Expressway and U.S. Highway 395. It boasted a fine restaurant and bar and people came from all over San Bernardino County to play cards.

During the 2000s United States housing bubble, many large suburban subdivisions were built in the southern portion of the city, along Highway 18. Like neighboring Victorville, Adelanto suffered severely from the collapse of real estate values after the 2008 financial crisis. While most of California has seen property values rise to historic highs, much of the Victor Valley region has yet to recover to the 2006 peak. However, in the years since the COVID-19 pandemic there has been a resurgence in suburban and exurban housing demand. Formerly affordable areas in the Inland Empire have become increasingly expensive, and the region has experienced a major boom in logistics and industrial development. As a result, residents and businesses seeking affordable properties have been increasingly looking further north along Interstate 15 and into Victorville and Adelanto.

== Geography ==
Adelanto is in the Victor Valley of the south-central Mojave Desert, north of the Cajon Pass and San Bernardino Valley.

According to the United States Census Bureau, the city has a total area of 52.9 square miles (137 km^{2}). 52.9 square miles (137 km^{2}) of it is land and 0.02 square miles (0.052 km^{2}) of it (0.03%) is water.

The average elevation of the city is 3,400 ft (1,036 m).

=== Climate ===
According to the Köppen Climate Classification system, Adelanto has a Tropical and Subtropical Steppe Climate, abbreviated "BSk" on climate maps.

== Demographics ==
Adelanto’s most common ancestries are Italian, German, English, and Irish. Spanish and Arabic are the most widely spoken languages other than English.

Historical population
Census	Pop.	Note	%±
1970	2,115		—
1980	2,164		2.3%
1990	8,517		293.6%
2000	18,130		112.9%
2010	31,765		75.2%
2020	38,046		19.8%
U.S. Decennial Census; 1860–1870 1880-1890; 1900 1910 1920; 1930 1940 1950; 1960 1970 1980; 1990 2000 2010

Adelanto first appeared as an unincorporated place in the 1970 U.S. census; and then as a city in the 1980 United States census.

=== Racial and ethnic composition ===
Adelanto city, California – Racial and ethnic composition Note: the US Census treats Hispanic/Latino as an ethnic category. This table excludes Latinos from the racial categories and assigns them to a separate category. Hispanics/Latinos may be of any race.
Race / Ethnicity (NH = Non-Hispanic)	Pop 2000	Pop 2010	Pop 2020	% 2000	% 2010	% 2020
White alone (NH)	6,616	5,395	4,218	36.49%	16.98%	11.09%
Black or African American alone (NH)	2,305	6,196	7,042	12.71%	19.51%	18.51%
Native American or Alaska Native alone (NH)	124	101	82	0.68%	0.32%	0.22%
Asian alone (NH)	274	522	959	1.51%	1.64%	2.52%
Native Hawaiian or Pacific Islander alone (NH)	27	177	234	0.15%	0.56%	0.62%
Other race alone (NH)	36	105	278	0.20%	0.33%	0.73%
Mixed race or Multiracial (NH)	449	756	1,075	2.48%	2.38%	2.83%
Hispanic or Latino (any race)	8,299	18,513	24,158	45.77%	58.28%	63.50%
Total	18,130	31,765	38,046	100.00%	100.00%	100.00%

=== 2023 estimates ===
According to the 2023 American Community Survey, the median household income was $68,419, and the per capita income was $19,480.

Of those aged 5 or older, 52.7% spoke only English at home, 45.2% spoke Spanish, 0.9% spoke other Indo-European languages, 0.9% spoke Asian or Pacific Islander languages, and 0.2% spoke other languages. Of those aged 25 or older, 73.5% were high school graduates and 7.8% had a bachelor's degree.

=== 2020 census ===
As of the 2020 census, Adelanto had a population of 38,046 and a population density of 719.7 inhabitants per square mile (277.9/km^{2}). 90.4% of residents lived in urban areas, while 9.6% lived in rural areas.

The census reported that 92.8% of residents lived in households, 0.2% lived in non-institutionalized group quarters, and 7.0% were institutionalized.

The median age was 29.2 years; 32.2% of residents were under the age of 18, 11.0% were 18 to 24, 29.9% were 25 to 44, 19.7% were 45 to 64, and 7.1% were 65 years of age or older. For every 100 females there were 109.6 males, and for every 100 females age 18 and over there were 111.2 males age 18 and over.

There were 9,185 households, of which 57.2% had children under the age of 18 living in them. Of all households, 45.4% were married-couple households, 16.2% were households with a male householder and no spouse or partner present, and 27.7% were households with a female householder and no spouse or partner present. About 11.7% of all households were made up of individuals and 3.8% had someone living alone who was 65 years of age or older. The average household size was 3.84. There were 7,594 families, representing 82.7% of all households.

There were 9,601 housing units, of which 4.3% were vacant. The homeowner vacancy rate was 1.2% and the rental vacancy rate was 4.6%. Of the 9,185 occupied units, 58.4% were owner-occupied and 41.6% were occupied by renters.

Racial composition as of the 2020 census
Race	Number	Percent
White	8,455	22.2%
Black or African American	7,396	19.4%
American Indian and Alaska Native	854	2.2%
Asian	1,049	2.8%
Native Hawaiian and Other Pacific Islander	284	0.7%
Some other race	14,685	38.6%
Two or more races	5,323	14.0%
Hispanic or Latino (of any race)	24,158	63.5%

== Economy ==
Historically Adelanto was a fruit-growing town. The city has only a few retail stores and restaurants. A bed tax contributes about $200,000 annually from its detention facilities. The small city has struggled as tax revenue fell far short of the city budget. In 2013, they closed a fire station and laid off a quarter of the town's staff. Residents though turned down a nearly 8% utility users tax in November 2013.

=== Prison facilities ===
Prior to 1992, much of the city's economy was related to George Air Force Base. After its closure the city began having economic difficulties. The openings of several area prisons began in 1991, and the city government approved the construction of two private prisons. Those prisons were not required to hire people within the Adelanto city limits. Ss of 2016, the city collects $160,000 in total annually from the prisons within the city limits. That year Jimi Devine of the San Francisco Chronicle wrote that the prisons "had mixed effects on the community for 25 years." Matt Tinoco of Vice wrote that "the prisons have failed to stimulate lasting growth in Adelanto" and that "all ultimately ended up contributing little to the city's coffers." Tinoco further stated that Adelanto had an "image as one big jail."

The privately owned Adelanto Detention Center, run by the GEO Group to house immigrant detainees, was originally built in 1991 as a state prison. In 2014, when a private developer proposed another prison, the city council approved a development agreement with the private developer that under California subdivision law allows the city to negotiate terms to provide additional benefits to the city. The city had little latitude to deny the private project as the land was appropriately zoned for use as a prison.

==== Federal prisons ====
Federal prisons of the Federal Bureau of Prisons near Adelanto:

- United States Penitentiary, Victorville
- Federal Correctional Institution, Victorville (on portions of the former George Air Force Base)

=== Cannabis ===
Upon the legalization of the sale and distribution of cannabis in 2016, marijuana cultivation was considered a possible new source of revenue for the city. Companies must be licensed by the local agency and the state to grow, test, or sell cannabis and the city may authorize none or only some of these activities. Local governments may not prohibit adults, who are in compliance with state laws, from growing, using, or transporting marijuana for personal use.

The city decided to allow multiple types of marijuana businesses, including cultivation, manufacturing and retail sales. By 2019, two cannabis dispensaries were serving recreational users as the city council considered proposed changes to the city's cannabis laws to generate additional revenue to help close the city budget gap. The city is the only Victor Valley municipality to allow storefront cannabis dispensaries. A 14-acre (5.7 ha) indoor cultivation facility was opened in 2019 by the California arm of Tikun Olam.

== Arts and culture ==
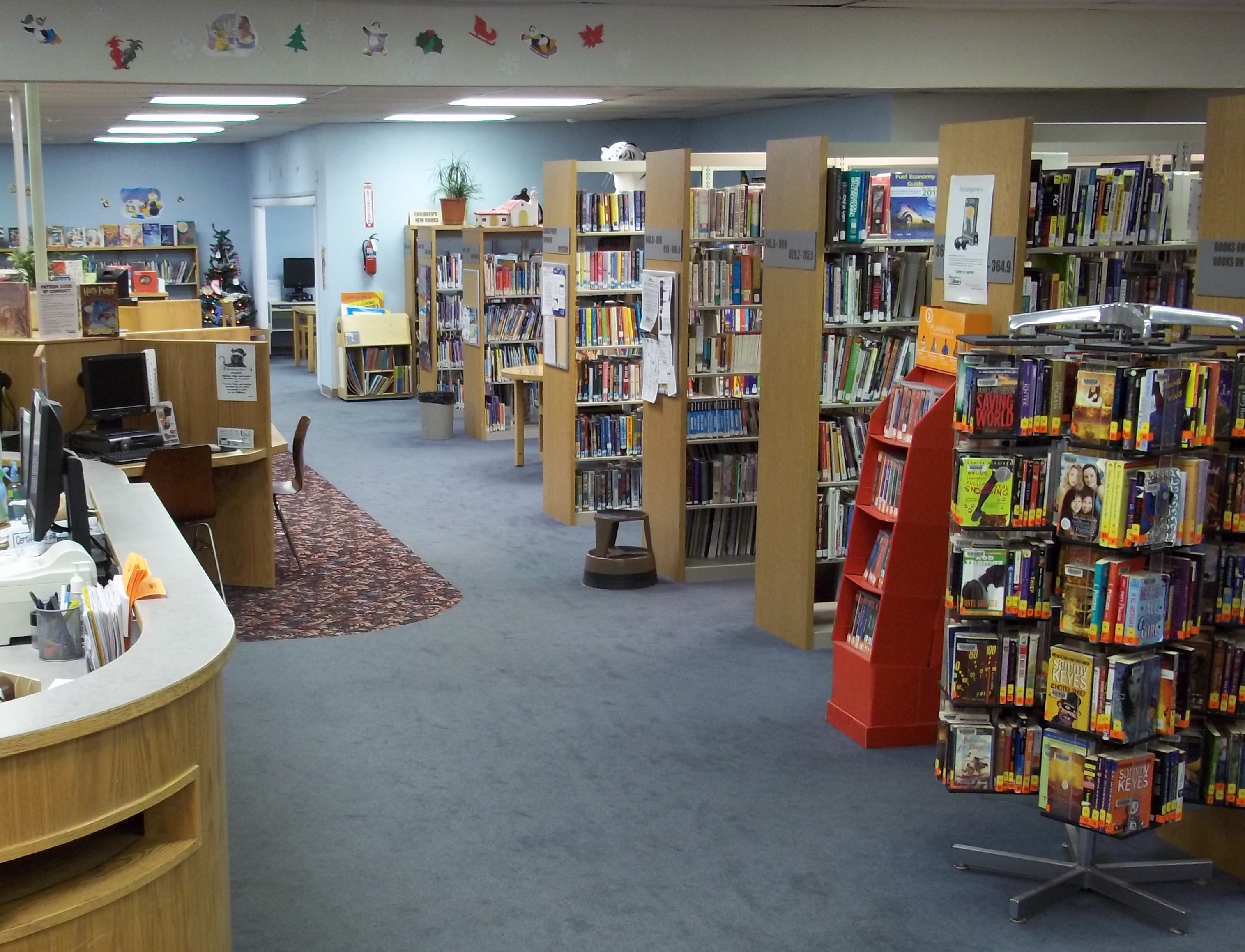
Adelanto Branch Library

Established in 1921 as part of the San Bernardino County's library system, the Adelanto Library began in the office of a fruit company.

El Mirage Dry Lake, west of Adelanto, has been used for filming movies and television commercials, most notably the opening sequence of the later episodes of the TV series Sky King.

== Sports ==
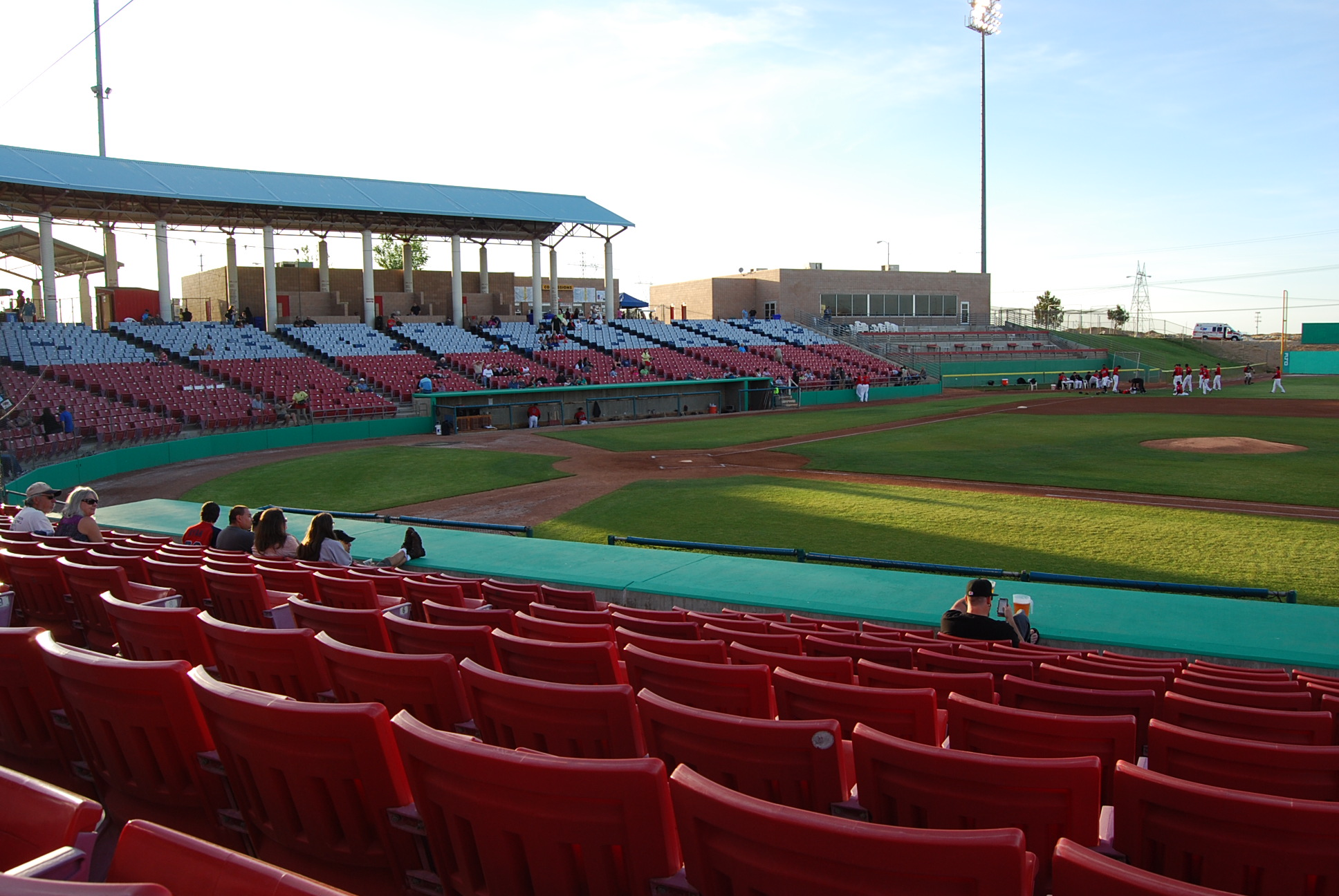
Adelanto Stadium

From 1991 to 2016, the city was home to the High Desert Mavericks, a Minor League Baseball team of the Class A-Advanced California League.

For the 2017 season, the Pecos League established the High Desert Yardbirds to fill the void at Adelanto Stadium. The team closed their last season at the stadium in 2019.

== Government ==
In the state legislature, Adelanto is in the 23rd senatorial district, represented by Republican Suzette Martinez Valladares, and in the 39th Assembly district, represented by Democrat Juan Carrillo.

In the United States House of Representatives, Adelanto is in California's 23rd congressional district, represented by Republican Jay Obernolte.

== Education ==
The majority of Adelanto is in the Adelanto Elementary School District (AESD) for preschool, elementary and middle school levels, while a very small portion is in the Oro Grande Elementary School District. The Adelanto Elementary District has nine elementary schools, three combined K-8 schools (one of them a virtual school, and three middle schools. High school-aged students in all of those elementary and middle school districts attend schools in the Victor Valley Union High School District (VVUSD), including Adelanto High School, the first high school in Adelanto city limits, or in the neighboring Snowline Joint Unified School District centered in Phelan.

Charter schools include:

- Taylion Academy
- Mojave River Academy
- Desert Trails Preparatory Academy - Formed in 2013 after a parent trigger law was used to remove Desert Trails Elementary from AESD control

== Infrastructure ==
Until 2001, Adelanto had its own police department, which was disbanded due to corruption, but now contracts with the San Bernardino County Sheriff's Department for police services. The Adelanto Substation is on US Highway 395 and Bartlett Avenue. The station provides full service law enforcement for the City of Adelanto, and unincorporated areas of the Victor Valley such as Phelan, Lucerne Valley, and Spring Valley Lake. The former regional station (next to the Victorville Courthouse), serving unincorporated areas of the Victor Valley, was consolidated into the Adelanto Station in 2009.

Until 1999, fire protection was provided by the city's own fire department. The city now contracts with the San Bernardino County Fire Department. There is one station within the city limits providing paramedic service as well as fire and rescue services. Ambulance and patient transportation is provided by American Medical Response.

== Sister cities ==
- Hadong, South Korea

== See also ==
- Interstate 15
