= High Desert Yardbirds =

- Logo

Information
- Location: Adelanto, California
- Ballpark: Adelanto Stadium
- Founded: 2016
- Folded: 2020
- League championships: 2017
- Former league: Pecos League (2017–2019)
- Colors: Black, red, orange, yellow, white
- Ownership: Andrew Dunn

The High Desert Yardbirds were a professional baseball team based in Adelanto, California that began play in 2017. They played in the Pecos League, an independent baseball league which is not affiliated with MLB or Minor League Baseball.

== History ==
Following the contraction of the California League's High Desert Mavericks, the Pecos League announced the Yardbirds as an expansion team for the 2017 season to fill the void at Adelanto Stadium. Under the helm of four managers in three seasons, the High Desert Yardbirds were able to amass a cumulative record of 111–79. In their final season, the 2019 Yardbirds had a record of 46–18, finished first in the Pacific Division, and broke every record set by former Yardbirds. With a league decision to remove all of the 2019 Yardbirds home games and several player promotions, the team slowly lost key players. Even with the gutting of the team, the 2019 Yardbirds were able to finish 13–7 as a road team and secure a first-round bye in playoffs. Unfortunately, the 2019 Yardbirds fell short and couldn't overcome any more adversity thrown at them by the league. On November 30, the Yardbirds announced that they will be playing in The Western League and they will be playing in Wasco, California. However, they were not included in the 2020 schedule and the league later announced that the team had folded. The Yardbirds were later planned to return for the 2021 season. However, due to the Pecos League revising the divisions, the team would remain folded.
