= Newton T. Bass House =

House in Apple Valley, California

Coordinates: 34.522966°N 117.222215°W

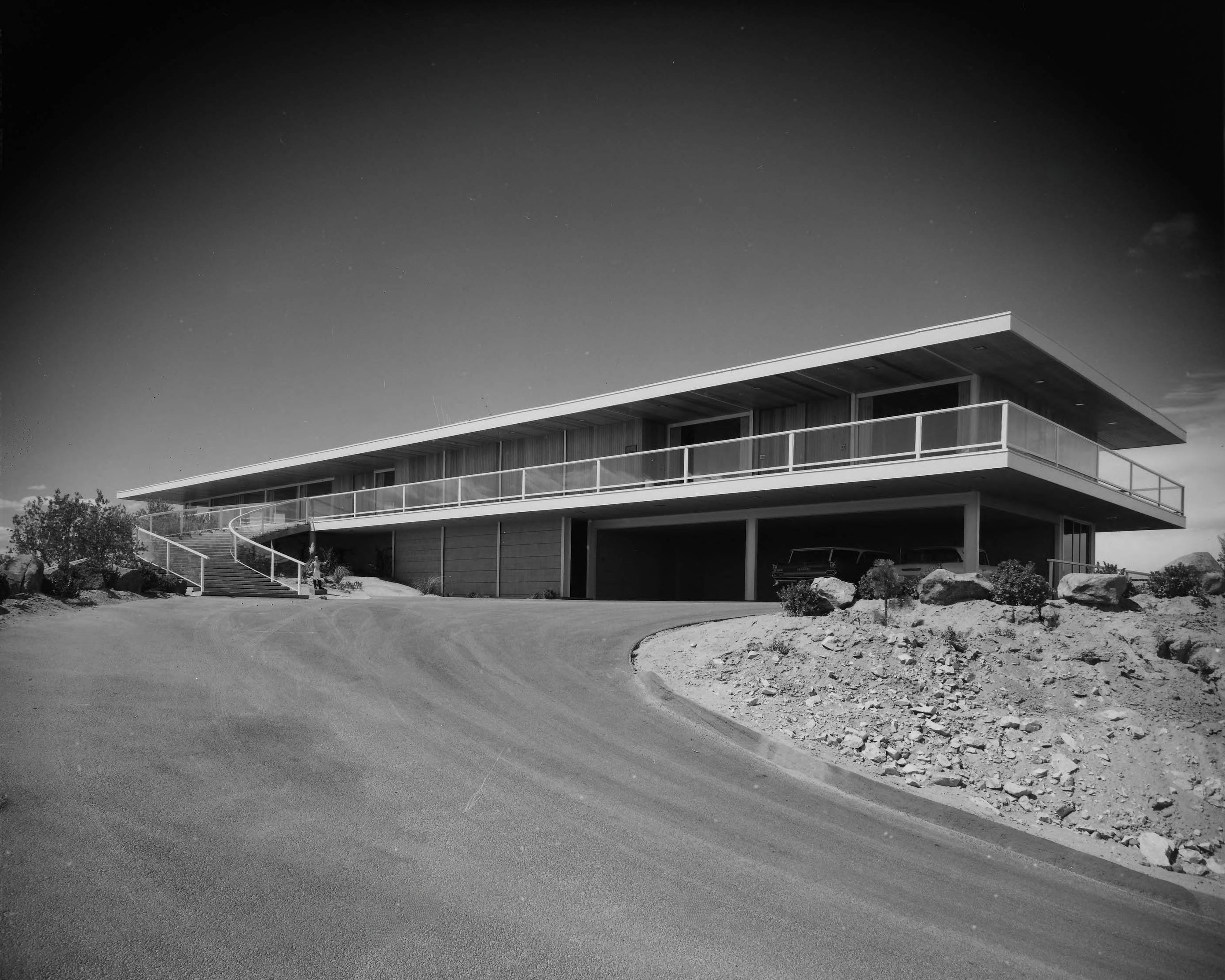

General information
- Location: Apple Valley, California
- Year built: 1959–60
- Renovated: 1968
- Demolished: September 2022

Design and construction
- Architect: Francisco Artigas
- Structural engineer: Wayne W. Ivans
- Other designers: Tommy Tomson (landscape)
- Main contractor: Bennington & Smith

Renovating team
- Architect: Leslie E. Arthur

The Newton T. Bass House, known colloquially as "Hilltop House," was a private residence in Apple Valley, California built in 1959 for Newton Thornberry Bass and designed by Mexican architect Francisco Artigas. The house, which the owner never occupied, was built atop Miner's Hill adjacent to the Apple Valley Inn that Bass had opened in 1948. The hilltop location provided panoramic views of the Victor Valley and symbolized Bass's preeminent status in the town.

In January 1967, the home was wrecked in a fire started during a robbery. Subsequently, in April 1968, reconstruction began following plans by Leslie E. Arthur, and the house was converted into a board room for the Reserve Oil and Gas Company, of which Bass was chairman of the board. Following Bass's death in 1983, the house was left abandoned for the next four decades. In 2016, the town of Apple Valley purchased the house, and in March 2022 the town council voted to demolish it. The house was torn down in September 2022.

== History and design ==
The creation of the Newton T. Bass House resulted from three circumstances. First, the decision in the early 1940s of Newton Bass to purchase a large tract of land in Apple Valley and to begin developing it. Second, the engagement of Tommy Tomson to work on the master plan of Apple Valley. And third, Tomson's friendship with architect Francisco Artigas.

In the 1950s, Francisco Artigas had come to California to try to establish an office, but failed to do so. However, during his time in California, Artigas befriended Golden Sands "Tommy" Tomson (1900–1986), a self-trained planner and landscape architect. Tomson had done planning for Garden of the Gods, Santa Anita Park, and Dunthorpe, Oregon, and had designed estates for Leonard Firestone, Samuel Goldwyn, Henry Fonda, Basil Rathbone, Charles Boyer, and Robert Montgomery. Tomson hired Artigas to design a home in Palm Desert.

Presumably, Bass met Artigas through Tomson. In 1959, Bass hired Artigas to design a house atop Miner's Hill, above his Apple Valley Inn. Construction began in 1959.

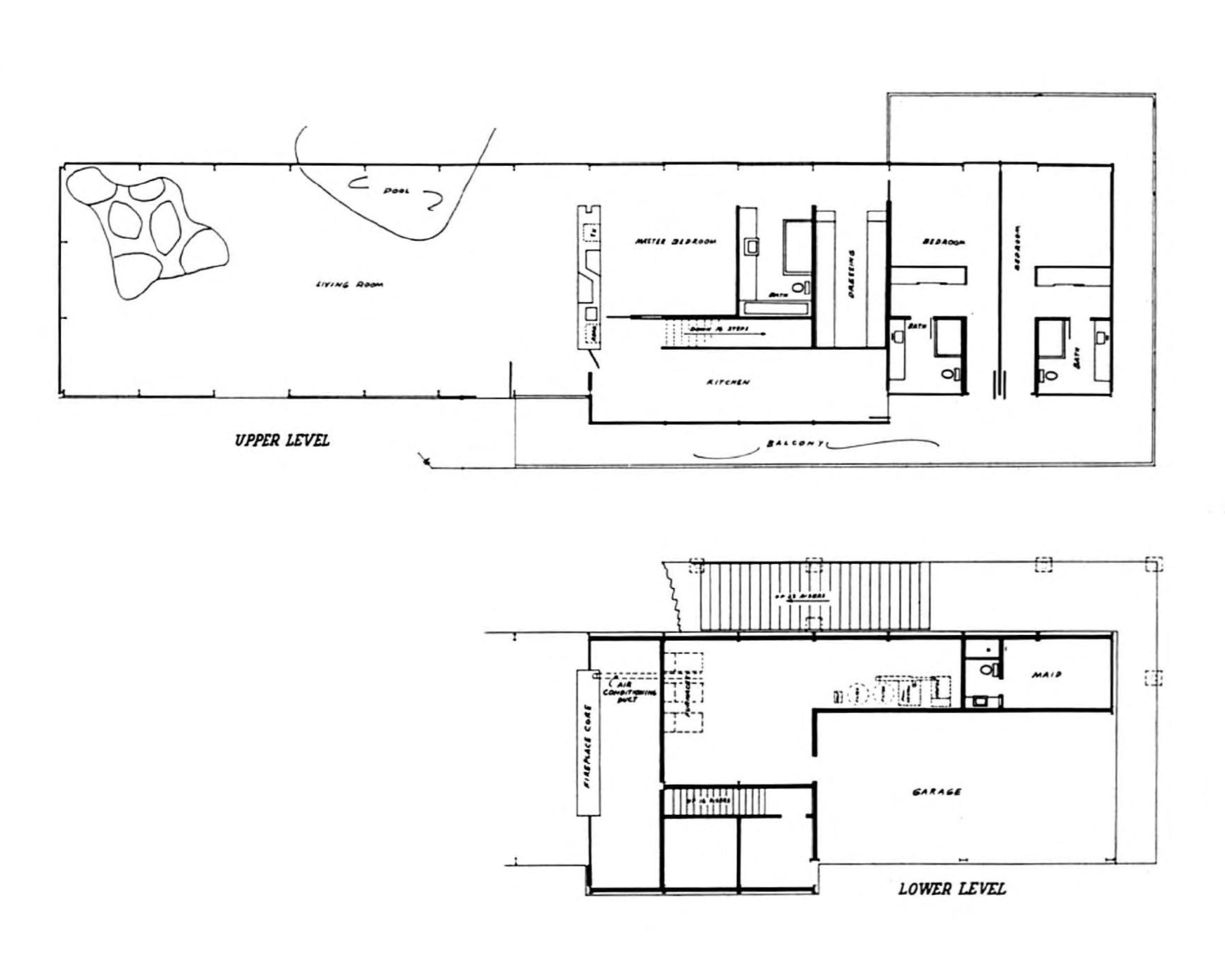
Floor plans of the house showing the upper and lower levels

The contractor, Bennington & Smith, blasted space in the boulders for the footings to be poured. After this, the Halsey Machine & Mfg. Co. erected the 35-tonne steel frame in five days. The house was built on a 10' by 10' grid, and was three bays wide and 14 bays long (30' by 140'), with a column-free plate. In the lower level, an open garage that was four bays long and two bays deep sat at the front right corner. At the back right was a maid's room with a bathroom and private patio. The remainder of the lower floor, which extended half the length of the upper floor, was occupied by mechanical space and storage. In the upper floor, the home was divided in two 70' halves by a large fireplace. The left half of the house included the living and dining rooms. At the far left, an outcropping of boulders were left and protruded through the floor. A 20' table was built out from the boulders. In the middle of the left half, an indoor-outdoor pool straddled the living room.

Bass had intended to use the house as his family home, but never occupied it. During daytime house a caretaker stayed in the house and allowed the public to enter and tour the home.

In August 1961, House Beautiful published in a feature on showers a photograph of the bathroom. The house was used as a filming location in the Perry Mason episode "The Case of the Roving River," which aired on December 30, 1961.

In the early hours of Monday, January 9, 1967, a fire broke out in the house. By the time the fire was discovered at 4 am, it was too late for the town's volunteer firemen to save it. On January 21, Michael Lawrence Smith, 24, and his brother Keith David Smith, 17, were arrested on suspicion of arson. In February, Keith testified against his older brother and explained that they had broken into the house to steal a rifle scope from the home's gun cabinet. During the break in, he explained, they had left burning candles on a side cabinet, which started the fire.

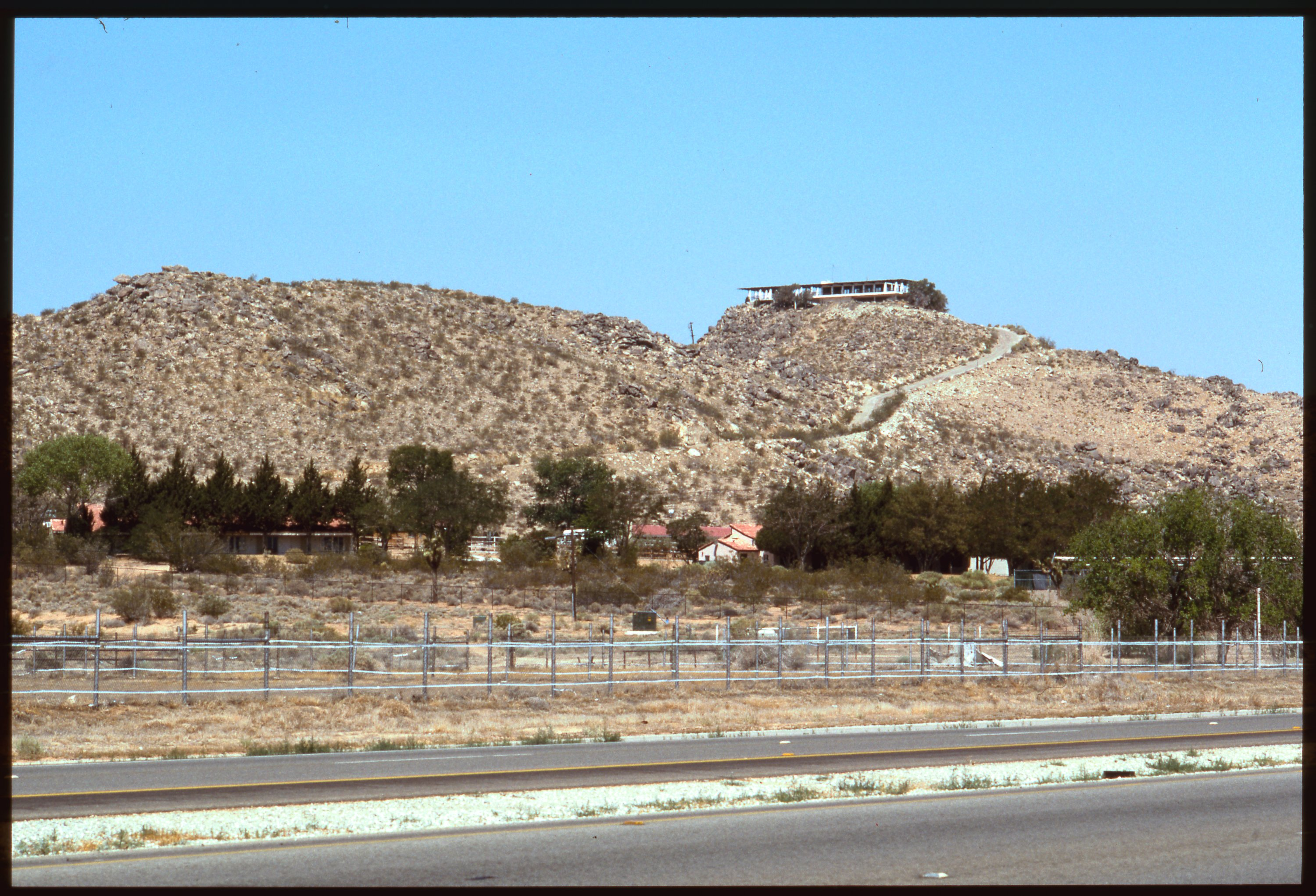
View of the house in 1996, with the Apple Valley Inn visible in the foreground

In April 1968, work began on the reconstruction of the house. Rather than rebuild the house as a private residence, it would be converted to a board room for use by the Reserve Oil and Gas Company. In March 1966, Bass had sold his business, the Apple Valley Building and Development Company, to Reserve, and in May 1966 he was elected chairman of Reserve. Bass remained chairman of the company until December 1973. The conversion was designed by architect Leslie E. Arthur in collaboration with Tommy Tomson, and the work was completed by September 1968. Construction was carried out by Hal B. Smith, the original contractor.

The reconstruction eschewed the original high modernist aesthetic and replaced it with a Spanish hacienda theme. The boardroom was placed in the right half of the house where the bedrooms had been previously, the and the steel structure was reinforced with concrete.

In early 1980, Reserve Oil and Gas was acquired by Getty Oil and the hilltop house became unused. After Bass died on February 6, 1983, the house was left vacant for the next four decades. In September 2022, demolition work began. The site is now owned by the city, which intends to build an observation deck in place of the house.
