= Linda A. Morabito =

American astronomer

Linda Morabito
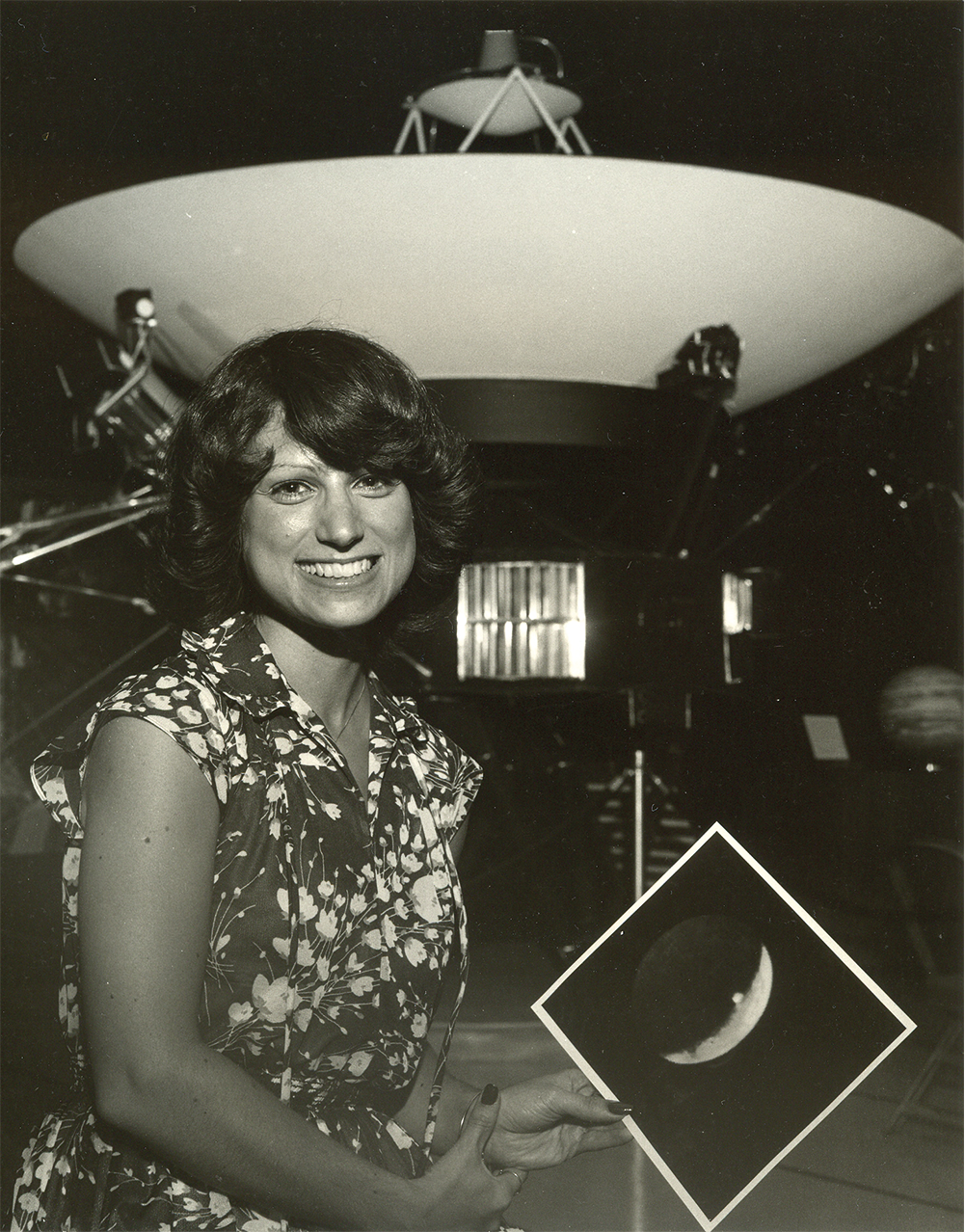
- Morabito pictured after her discovery of Io volcanism, in front of a model of the Voyager, holding the discovery image
- Born: November 21, 1953 (age 72); Vancouver, British Columbia, Canada
- Citizenship: United States
- Education: University of Southern California
- Known for: Discovering volcanism on Io
- Children: 1
- Website: www.lindamorabito.com

Linda A. Morabito (born November 21, 1953), also known as Linda Kelly, Linda Hyder, and Linda Morabito-Meyer, is the astronomer who discovered volcanic activity on Io, a moon of Jupiter. She made this finding on March 9, 1979, at NASA's Jet Propulsion Laboratory. At the time of her discovery, she was serving as Cognizant Engineer over the Optical Navigation Image Processing System (ONIPS) on the Voyager deep space mission Navigation Team. While performing image processing analysis of a Voyager 1 picture taken for spacecraft navigation, she detected a 270 kilometres (170 mi) tall cloud off the limb of Io. The cloud was of volcanic origin. This was the first time in history that active volcanism was detected off of Earth. Her discovery is considered by some planetary scientists as the largest discovery of the planetary exploration program that has come out of Jet Propulsion Laboratory. Morabito is currently an associate professor of astronomy at Victor Valley College. She also authored a memoir, Parallel Universes, a Memoir from the Edges of Space and Time.

== Background and family ==
Born in Vancouver, British Columbia, Canada, she immigrated with her family to the United States in 1961. As a child, she believed that she had always known she would be an astronomer and benefited greatly from an accelerated program of learning in the Pasadena, CA Unified School District, skipping an entire year of elementary school because of her demonstrated knowledge. By her 9th year of school, she wrote a paper for school entitled "My Job in the World: Astronomer".

Linda Morabito married Major David Meyer (U.S. Air Force, Retired), an associate professor of astronomy, in 2008. She has one son, Ryan Hyder (father Jerry Douglas Hyder), who was a musician, two step-sons, Jason and Brett Hyder and three grandchildren Robert Wooten, Nathan Hyder and J.D. Hyder.

== Academic career ==
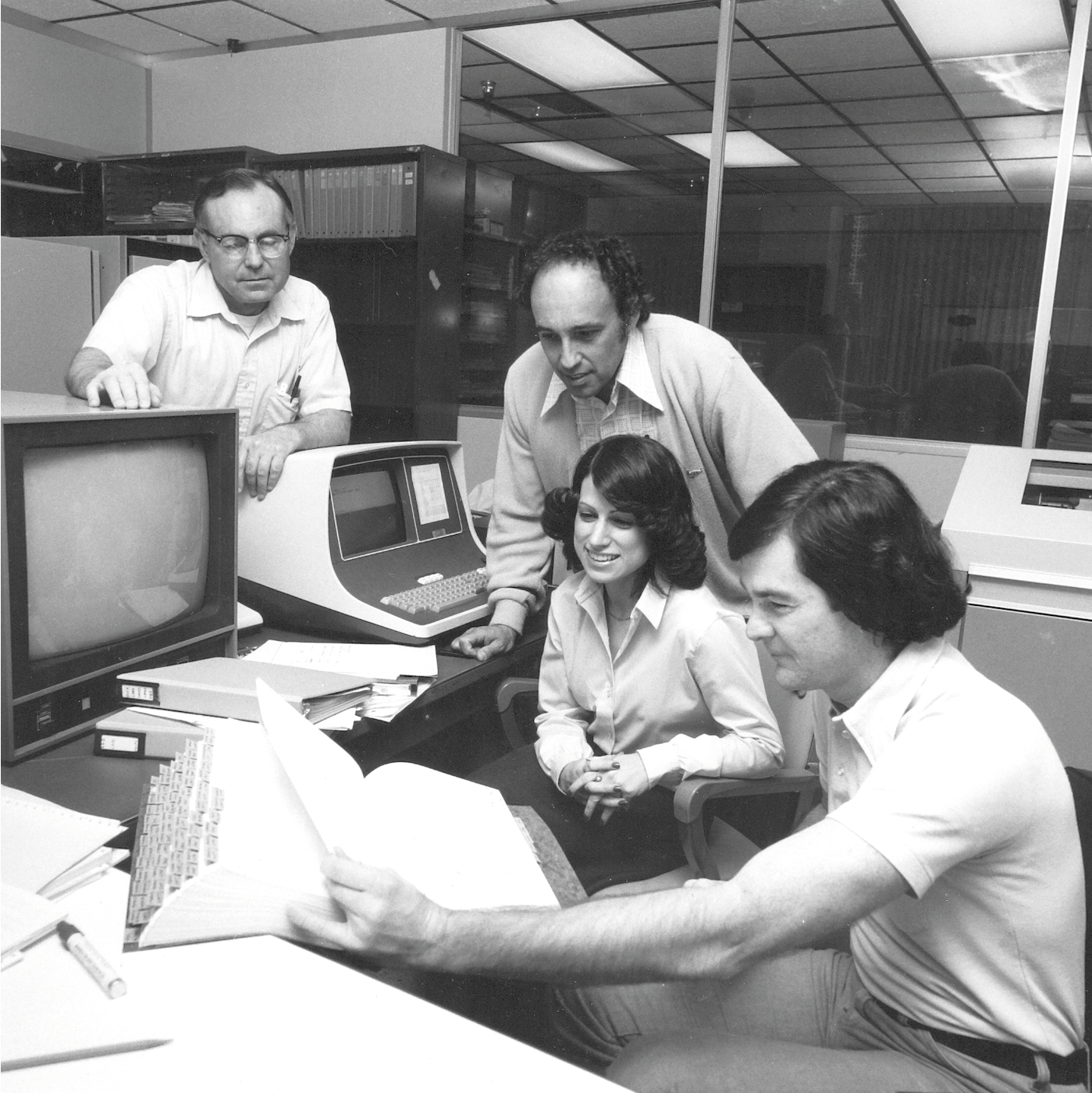
Joe Donegan, Ed Travers, Linda Morabito and Steve Synnott in the navigation team’s image processing room, where the discovery of active volcanism on Io took place.

Linda Morabito graduated from the University of Southern California (USC) with a B.S. in astronomy in 1974 and did graduate work in computer science at USC. Before receiving her astronomy degree, she joined NASA's Jet Propulsion Laboratory (JPL) for temporary summer employment, and later accepted a position after receiving her Bachelor's degree in the Outer Planet Satellite Ephemeris Development Group at JPL as an engineer (1974–1981). In March 1979, she discovered the anomalous "crescent" off the limb of Jupiter's moon Io in a picture of Io taken by Voyager 1 for navigation, after its close encounter with Jupiter. She proposed a series of hypotheses and conducted investigations to prove or disprove them, to identify the "crescent". Morabito was able to deduce that the observation was a plume erupting from the surface of Io, and volcanic in origin. Her discovery was announced to the world on March 12, 1979.

She joined The Planetary Society as Manager of Education and Program Development (1997–2004), where she conducted educational outreach for the Mars Global Surveyor mission to Mars leading to the involvement of students in the Mars Exploration Rover mission with the Spirit and Opportunity rovers on Mars. She became an associate professor of Astronomy at Victor Valley College in 2007, where she currently teaches. She also served as a Guest Investigator on the Viking Extended Mission to Mars (1977), conducting an experiment on the surface of Mars, utilizing data collected by the two Viking landers and orbiters. She served as Global Curriculum Developer at the Lewis Center for Educational Research (2007–2009), in which she participated in the instruction of students worldwide in the use of a radio telescope for astronomical research in cooperation with several NASA missions, including the Spitzer Space Telescope, the Juno mission to Jupiter, and the LCROSS mission to the Moon. She has served as an astronomer lecturer for more than 30 years, and has appeared in numerous science documentaries, and was the regular guest science commentator on two nationally televised talk shows in Vancouver, British Columbia, Canada (1979–1981).

== Non-academic life ==
In 2004, Linda Morabito realized that she was a victim of severe childhood abuse and suffered from post-traumatic stress disorder. She is a champion of eye movement desensitization and reprocessing, discovered by Dr. Francine Shapiro, as treatment for PTSD. From her experiences and recovery from childhood abuse, Linda Morabito has developed a strong Christian perspective. Her memoir Parallel Universes, a Memoir from the Edges of Space and Time is a Christian book and a personal and science memoir. The book documents several near death experiences at the hands of her parents and William Franklin Wolsey of the Temple of the More Abundant Life in Vancouver, British Columbia, Canada between 1954 and 1956; her quest to uncover a hidden past from 2003 to 2011; and the events of her major NASA science discovery in 1979.

== Honors ==
Morabito has been awarded the following honors during her career:

- NASA Group Achievement Award for Voyager Flight Operations, Navigation Team
- NASA Group Achievement Award for Voyager Mission Operations System Design, Ground Data Systems Development
- NASA Group Achievement Award for Voyager Mission Design, Ephemeris Development
- Individual Certificate of Appreciation from NASA for contributing substantially to the mission of NASA by advancing image processing techniques and make the discovery of the volcanic activity on Io
- Named by Aviation Week & Space Technology as on the individuals deserving special recognition for the advancement of aerospace
- Honored by the International Astronomical Union by the designation of Asteroid 3106 Morabito for her discovery of volcanic activity on Io
