= Lucerne Valley, California =

Lucerne Valley
- census-designated place
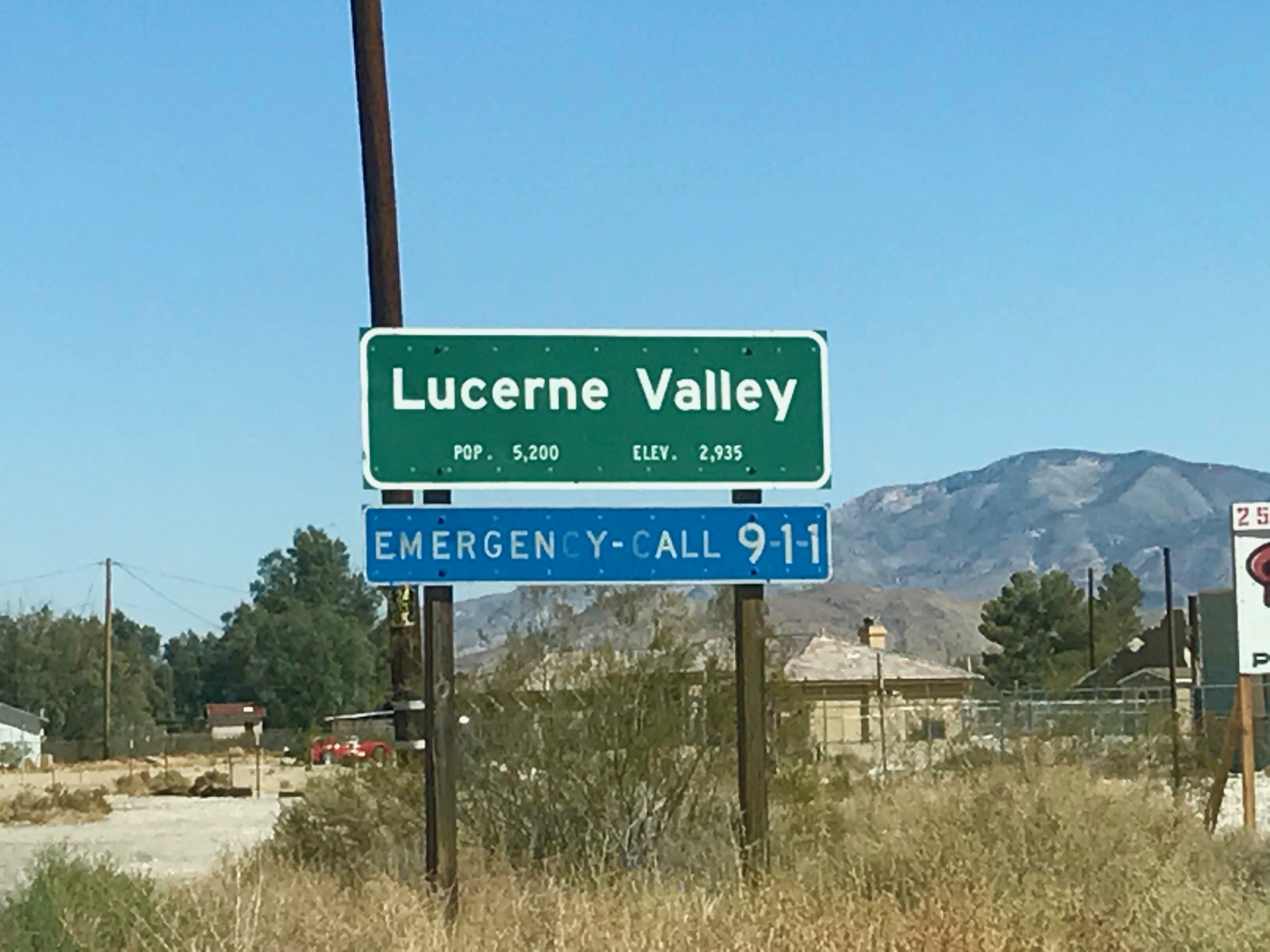

- Seal

- Location in San Bernardino County and the state of California

- Location in California
- Coordinates: 34°26′38″N 116°58′1″W
- Country: United States
- State: California
- County: San Bernardino

Government
  - Managed by: County of San Bernardino, 5th District

Area
  - Total: 105.590 sq mi (273.477 km^{2})
  - Land: 105.590 sq mi (273.477 km^{2})
  - Water: 0 sq mi (0 km^{2}) 0%
- Elevation: 2,953 ft (900 m)

Population (2020)
  - Total: 5,331
  - Density: 50.49/sq mi (19.49/km^{2})
- Time zone: UTC-8 (Pacific (PST))
  - Summer (DST): UTC-7 (PDT)
- ZIP code: 92356
- Area codes: 442/760
- GNIS Feature IDs: 272271; 2627937
- Website: lucernevalley.net

Lucerne Valley is a census-designated place (CDP) and valley landform in the southern Mojave Desert, in western San Bernardino County, California.

As of the 2020 census, Lucerne Valley had a population of 5,331.

== Geography ==
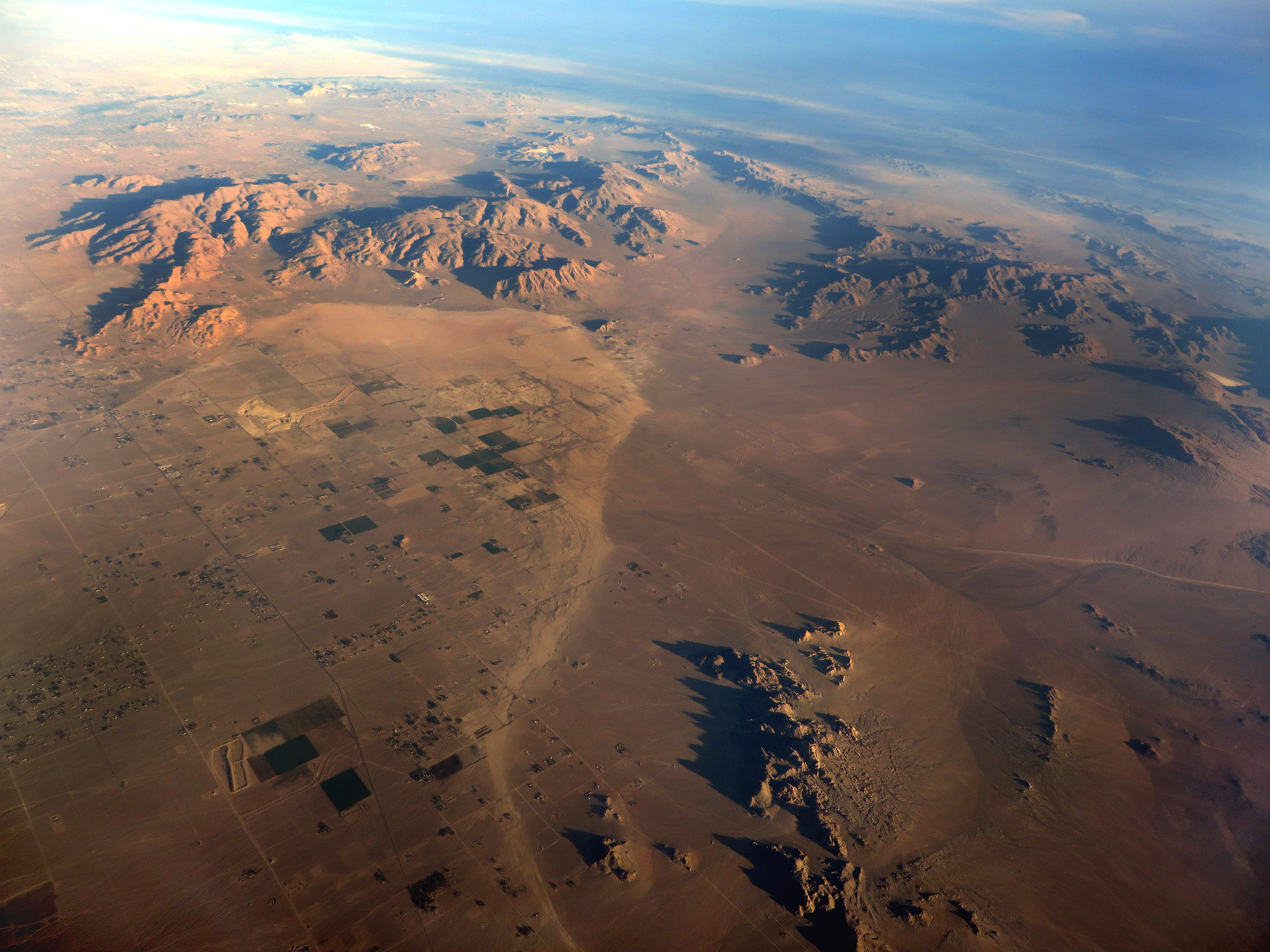
Lucerne Valley in the Mojave Desert. This view is to the northwest with the Mojave River at the top of the photo.

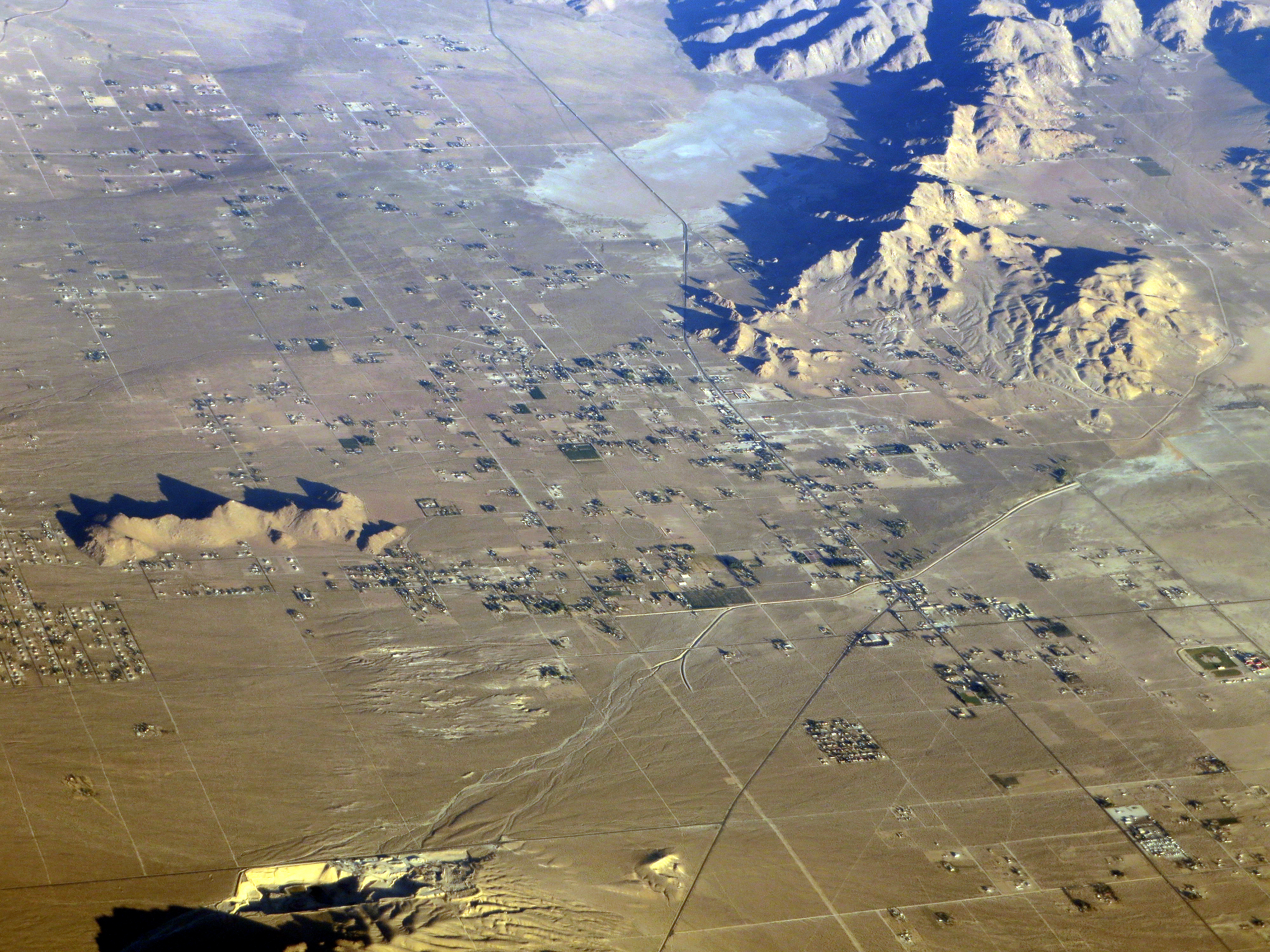
The Lucerne Valley community

The geographic valley is defined by the surrounding Granite Mountains, Ord Mountains, and San Bernardino Mountains.

Lucerne Valley lies east of the Victor Valley, whose population nexus includes Victorville, Apple Valley, Adelanto and Hesperia. It is 19 miles (31 km) east of Apple Valley, and 20 miles (32 km) north of Big Bear Lake. Distant surrounding communities include Yucca Valley which lies 45 miles (72 km) east via State Route 247/Old Woman Springs Road, and Barstow, which is 26 miles (42 km) north via State Route 247/Barstow Road.

The transportation nexus of Lucerne Valley is where State Route 247 and State Route 18 are connected by Old Woman Springs and Barstow Roads. The two highways do not have a direct junction.

In San Bernardino County, Lucerne Valley's area is also identified as County Service Area (CSA) 29. While Lucerne Valley's "town limit" signs are within two miles of each other, the County Service Area Limits are much larger: in the west to Joshua Road (unpaved road east of Milpas Rd. on Hwy. 18), to the north at the 4,000 feet (1,200 m) height of Ord Mountain on Highway 247, to the south at the entrance to Cushenbury Canyon on Highway 18, and at Old Woman Springs Ranch as the eastern boundary. On June 11, 2013, Lucerne Valley and Johnson Valley were merged under the same Municipal Advisory Council, which serves as an advisory reporting agency to the County of San Bernardino District Supervisor concerning the region. On August 14, 2013, Johnson Valley was sworn into the same Municipal Advisory Council as Lucerne Valley. CSA 29's borders, however, remain unchanged from the move.

According to the United States Census Bureau, the CDP covers an area of 105.6 square miles (273.5 km^{2}), all of it land.

=== Climate ===
According to the Köppen Climate Classification system, Lucerne Valley has a semi-arid climate, abbreviated "BSk" on climate maps.

== Demographics ==
Historical population
Census	Pop.	Note	%±
2010	5,811		—
2020	5,331		−8.3%
U.S. Decennial Census; 1850–1870 1880-1890; 1900 1910 1920; 1930 1940 1950; 1960 1970 1980; 1990 2000 2010

Lucerne Valley first appeared as a census designated place in the 2010 U.S. census.

=== 2020 census ===
As of the 2020 census, Lucerne Valley had a population of 5,331 and a population density of 50.5 inhabitants per square mile (19.5/km^{2}). The median age was 45.5 years. The age distribution was 21.8% under the age of 18, 6.9% aged 18 to 24, 20.7% aged 25 to 44, 29.5% aged 45 to 64, and 21.1% aged 65 or older. For every 100 females there were 110.5 males, and for every 100 females age 18 and over there were 111.9 males age 18 and over.

The census reported that 99.2% of the population lived in households, 0.8% lived in non-institutionalized group quarters, and no one was institutionalized. 0.0% of residents lived in urban areas, while 100.0% lived in rural areas.

There were 1,974 households in Lucerne Valley, of which 25.5% had children under the age of 18 living in them. Of all households, 41.0% were married-couple households, 8.7% were cohabiting-couple households, 27.2% were households with a male householder and no spouse or partner present, and 23.2% were households with a female householder and no spouse or partner present. About 28.0% of all households were made up of individuals and 14.0% had someone living alone who was 65 years of age or older. The average household size was 2.68. There were 1,254 families (63.5% of all households).

There were 2,686 housing units at an average density of 25.4 units per square mile (9.8 units/km^{2}), of which 1,974 (73.5%) were occupied and 26.5% were vacant. The homeowner vacancy rate was 5.5% and the rental vacancy rate was 11.7%. Of occupied housing units, 69.4% were owner-occupied and 30.6% were occupied by renters.

Racial composition as of the 2020 census
Race	Number	Percent
White	3,330	62.5%
Black or African American	136	2.6%
American Indian and Alaska Native	90	1.7%
Asian	153	2.9%
Native Hawaiian and Other Pacific Islander	10	0.2%
Some other race	934	17.5%
Two or more races	678	12.7%
Hispanic or Latino (of any race)	1,752	32.9%

=== Demographic estimates ===
In 2023, the US Census Bureau estimated that 16.4% of the population were foreign-born. Of all people aged 5 or older, 71.1% spoke only English at home, 23.5% spoke Spanish, 1.0% spoke other Indo-European languages, and 4.3% spoke Asian or Pacific Islander languages. Of those aged 25 or older, 76.5% were high school graduates and 15.7% had a bachelor's degree.

=== Income and poverty ===
The median household income in 2023 was $50,330, and the per capita income was $22,888. About 29.7% of families and 35.6% of the population were below the poverty line.

== Development ==
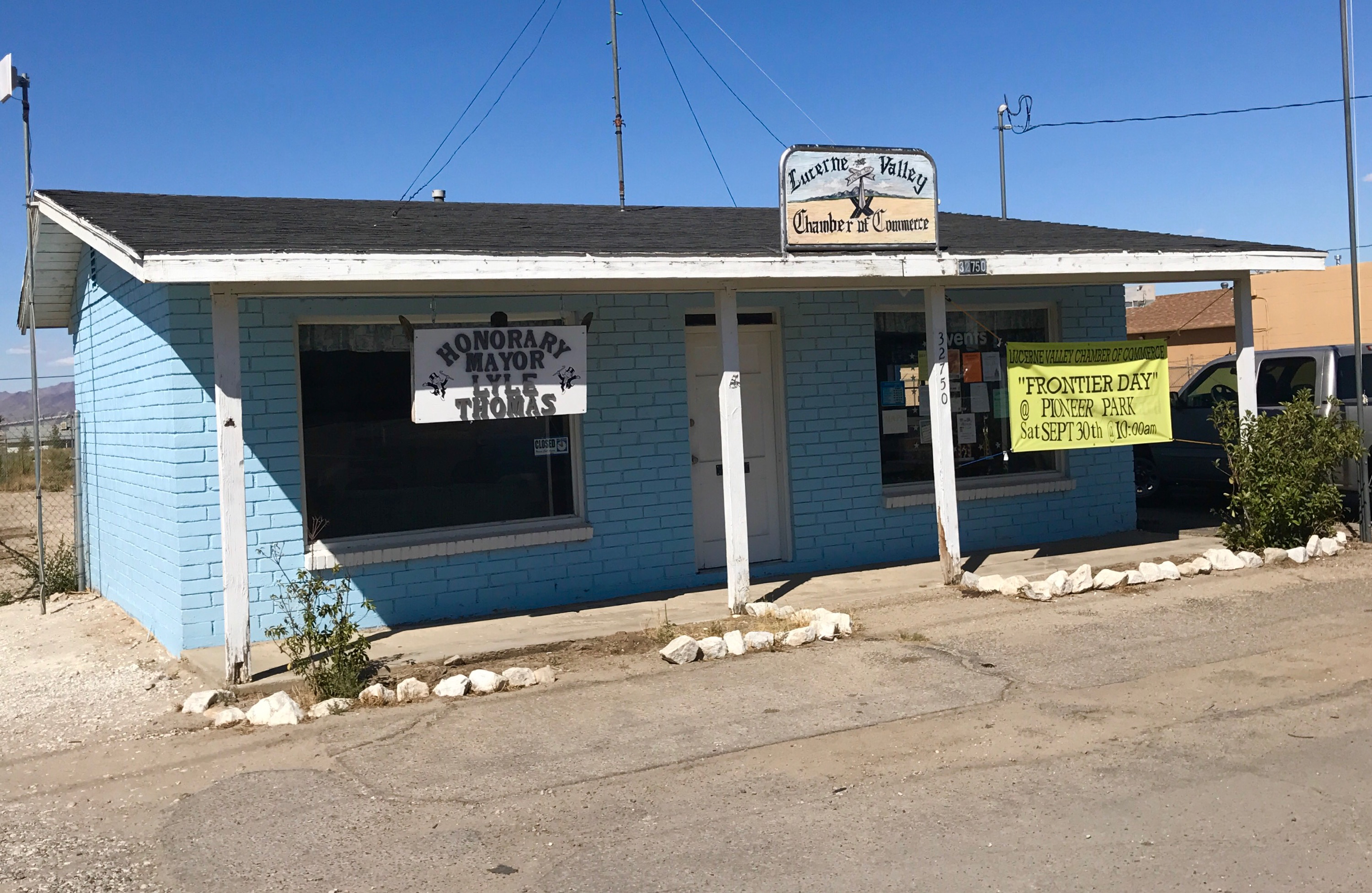
Lucerne Valley Chamber of Commerce

=== Zoning ===
The majority of Lucerne Valley's zoning consists of Rural Residential, Resource Conservation and Residential zones.

Industrial zoning is predominantly in the southern border of the community on the north-facing slopes of the San Bernardino Mountains.

The commercial zoning corridor is primarily on State Route 18, with outlying businesses within a mile of the eastern half of the Old Woman Springs/Barstow Road junction. Commercial development is focused on mixed-use development, with storefronts facing the highway and a private residence on the same property behind the business on the same lot. Traditional retail construction has been restrained in the latter half of the 20th century to keep the rural character of the town intact, but in September 2015 a Dollar General store opened as the first franchise grocery retail to enter town limits.

All residential zones are classified as Rural, Single or Medium density. Most housing developments are tract-based and were completed prior to the 1990s. No further tract-based construction projects have been built in 20 years, with most new construction done individually on privately owned lots. An attempt to construct a golf course and install utilities for residential/commercial zones called "Rancho Lucerne" began grading north of the high school site before embezzlement charges filed against the financier caused the project to shut down in 2001, leaving the site abandoned and desert habitat destroyed.

=== Utilities ===
The majority of projects planned for the town are to transfer local resources for statewide use. Projects include solar power plants (all state power plants are required to sell generated energy to CalISO as a common carrier arrangement) as well as water for both direct use by the Los Angeles Department of Water and Power (LADWP) and wells used for cooling solar plants. In 2012, LADWP cancelled an attempt to install a two mile wide water and power corridor in the southern half of the town.

Electricity service for the entire town is provided by Southern California Edison. Gas pipeline, water districts and trash service vary from neighborhood to neighborhood. A county landfill is present in the northeast on Camp Rock Rd.

== Education ==
Most of the CDP is in the Lucerne Valley Unified School District while some of it is in the Apple Valley Unified School District.

Lucerne Valley Unified School District operates three school campuses run by Lucerne Valley Unified School District. Lucerne Valley Elementary School, built in 1952, serves grades K–5. Lucerne Valley Middle School was built in 1986 and formerly served grades 6–8. Lucerne Valley High School was built in 1992 and serve grades 6–12 after merging the portables from the prior middle school site onto the campus in 1998. The high school's first graduating class was in 1995. The school district office, community day school, and Mountain View High School have moved into the former Lucerne Valley Middle School site in the 2000s.

== Public safety and amenities ==
San Bernardino County requires cities and towns to be incorporated. As Lucerne Valley is an unincorporated community in the county, services and local government responsibilities in Lucerne Valley are operated by the state and county. San Bernardino County operates a sheriff's substation and a full-time staffed county fire station in town limits for fire and ambulance service. The same fire station serves as the CSA 29 field office, which operates a parks and recreation department to maintain the town parks, county facilities including a community center, senior center, the county library, an ATSC TV translator tower, and a public cemetery. Cal Fire also has a separate fire station east of the town between Lucerne Valley and Johnson Valley.

California Highway Patrol provides traffic enforcement and investigation from the Victorville office. Local emergencies are dispatched from the Adelanto Sheriff Office.

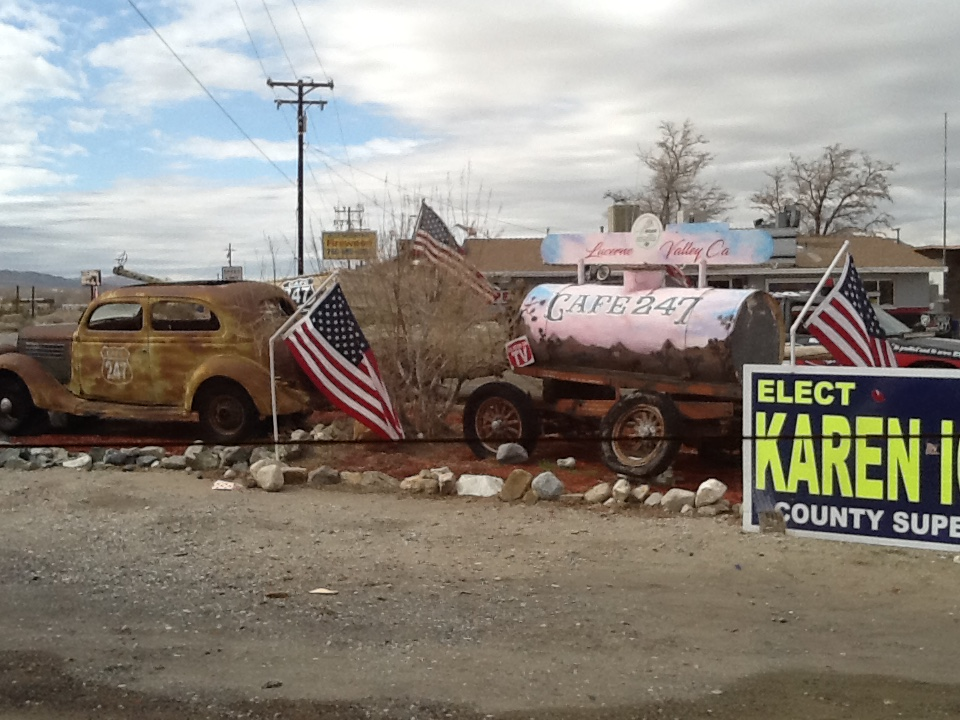
Cafe 247, as seen from CA-247, in Lucerne Valley, California

== Economy ==
Mitsubishi Cement operates the Cushenbury plant in Lucerne Valley.

== In popular culture ==
The dry lakes and mountainous terrain surrounding the town have been used in television, film, and photography, including movies such as Stagecoach (1939), Tarantula, and The Hills Have Eyes (1977). On September 24–25, 2016, The Grand Tour on Amazon Prime shot an episode at Rabbit Dry Lake outside Lucerne Valley town limits.

== Features ==
- Lucerne Dry Lake and Rabbit Springs Dry Lake — two dry lakes in the Lucerne Valley. A variety of small meteorites have been found in these two dry lakes. The Critically endangered wildflower Parish's popcornflower (Plagiobothrys parishii) is native to the springs of Rabbit Springs Dry Lake.

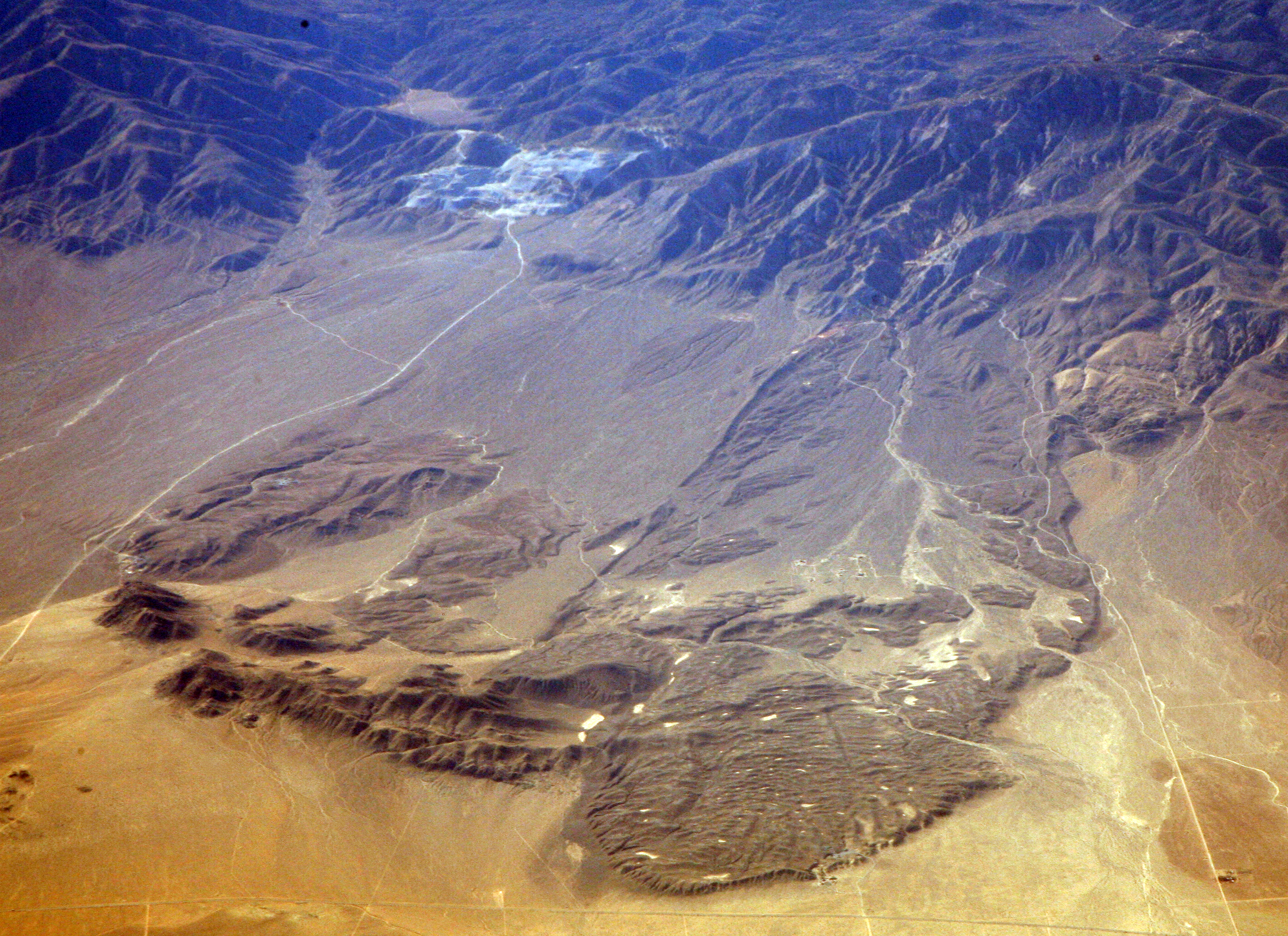
The Blackhawk Landslide

- Blackhawk Landslide — a prehistoric landslide that is one of the largest known in North America is in the southeast corner of the Lucerne Valley.
- Chimney Rock — a registered California Historical Landmark, in the mountains north of the Rabbit Springs Dry Lake and of Highway 18 near the Rabbit Springs Road junction. It is the site of the last battle between immigrant settlers and a Native American tribe in the Mojave Desert. Conflicts between Native Americans and white settlers over the rich lands of the San Bernardino Mountains culminated in the battle at Chimney Rock on February 16, 1867. Although Native Americans defended themselves fiercely, they were forced to retreat into the desert. In the years following, traditional Native American mountain food gathering areas were lost to white encroachment. A historical marker is beside Highway 18, next to the welcome sign on the town's western border.34.450157°N 117.003937°W
- King Clone - the oldest creosote bush ring in the Mojave Desert, is located in the Creosote Rings Preserve east of Lucerne Valley.

=== Parks ===
Parks in the Lucerne Valley include:

- Pioneer Park, next to the fire station, is the main park for San Bernardino County's CSA 29 and used for most public community events. The Lucerne Valley Museum is in the park, and has self-guided tours.
- Midway Park, at Midway and Rabbit Springs Roads, is the location of the Midway Schoolhouse and Equestrian Arena.
- Visalia Park, which used to be the Lucerne Springs Pool Club. After the club was abandoned in 2011, the pool has been filled in and turned into a town park.
- The Johnson Valley OHV Area is mostly in Johnson Valley, and bordered on the west by Lucerne Valley. Expansion plans in 2012 for the Marine Corps Air Ground Combat Center Twentynine Palms threatened at one point to end the King of the Hammers seasonal off-road vehicle race that brings annual business to Lucerne Valley.
- Mojave Trails National Monument is to the east and north of the Lucerne Valley.

== See also ==
- Populated places in the Mojave Desert
- Solar power plants in the Mojave Desert
- Victorville Precision Bombing range
