= Chris Brymer =

American football player (born 1974)

Profile
- Position: Guard

Personal information
- Born: November 29, 1974; Apple Valley, California, U.S.
- Died: April 24, 2023 (aged 48); Apple Valley, California, U.S.
- Listed height: 6 ft 3 in (1.91 m)
- Listed weight: 300 lb (136 kg)

Career information
- High school: Apple Valley (CA)
- College: USC
- NFL draft: 1999: undrafted

Career history
- Seattle Seahawks (1998)*; Miami Dolphins (1998)*; Dallas Cowboys (1999); → Rhein Fire (1999–2000); Los Angeles Xtreme (2001)
- * Offseason or practice squad member only

Christopher Grant Brymer (November 29, 1974 – April 24, 2023) was an American football guard in the National Football League for the Miami Dolphins and Dallas Cowboys. He played college football at USC.

== Early life ==
Born in Apple Valley, California, he enrolled at Apple Valley High School, before transferring to the Sherman Private High School, where he graduated from in 1993.

He received Blue Chip All-America, Scholastic Coach All-America honorable-mention and SuperPrep All-Far West honors. He also competed in the shot put and discus throw.

== College career ==
Brymer accepted a football scholarship from University of Southern California. As a redshirt freshman in 1994, he started 6 of the last 7 games of the season.

As a sophomore in 1995, he was suspended after being declared academically ineligible to play.

He was a starter at left guard in his last two seasons and was named honorable-mention All-PAC-10.

== Career ==
In 1998, he was signed by the Seattle Seahawks as an undrafted free agent. He was waived before the start of the season on August 30, 1998.

On November 11, 1998, he was signed by the Miami Dolphins to the practice squad. He was released on December 23, 1998.

On February 18, 1999, he was allocated by the Dallas Cowboys to the Rhein Fire of NFL Europe. He played in 8 games at left guard. He was released by the Cowboys on September 5. He was signed to the practice squad on September 7, where he spent the rest of the season.

In February 2000, he was allocated by the Dallas Cowboys to the Rhein Fire of NFL Europe for a second time. He started 9 out of 10 games, as part of an offensive line that allowed a league-low 23 sacks. He contributed to the team winning World Bowl 2000. He was released by the Cowboys with an injury settlement on August 21, 2000.

In 2001, he played for the Los Angeles Xtreme of the XFL. The league folded at the end of the season.

== Personal life ==
Brymer was married to his high school girlfriend Melissa; they had a son in 2003 and separated in 2005. Melissa Brymer told SF Weekly in 2010 that Chris, during his football career, would have angry bouts and accuse her of infidelity. He worked in the mortgage industry, before founding CMG Capital, which was a residential and commercial mortgage company. After CMG Capital folded, the Brymers lost their two homes. Melissa moved to San Bernardino County with their son, and Chris became homeless.

On July 19, 2010, Brymer left a San Francisco soup kitchen with another man, Henry Therkield, who had accosted him earlier. Brymer pulled out a 6-inch blade and became confrontational with that man and that man's friend Shaun Parker before leaving on a MUNI T-line train. Brymer was arrested the next day at another MUNI station. During the trial, Therkield testified that he heard Brymer threaten him but stated otherwise in an interview with SF Weekly. However, Brymer was acquitted of hate crimes in November 2010. Former San Francisco district attorney Terence Hallinan commented about acquittals like this: "Juries lose confidence in [prosecutors], and a hate crime doesn’t have the same clarity that it should have." He died on April 24, 2023.
