= LCER =

LCER may refer to:

- Labour Campaign for Electoral Reform
- Lewis Center for Educational Research, an educational organization in Apple Valley, California
