= LVUSD =

LVUSD may refer to:

- Las Virgenes Unified School District
- Lucerne Valley Unified School District
