= Bryce Quigley =

American football player (born 1992)

No. 68, 72
- Position: Offensive tackle

Personal information
- Born: June 26, 1992 (age 34); Apple Valley, California, U.S.
- Listed height: 6 ft 5 in (1.96 m)
- Listed weight: 295 lb (134 kg)

Career information
- High school: Granite Hills (Apple Valley)
- College: San Diego State
- NFL draft: 2014: undrafted

Career history
- Detroit Lions (2014)*; San Diego Chargers (2014)*; Washington Redskins (2015)*
- * Offseason or practice squad member only
- Stats at Pro Football Reference

Bryce Quigley (born June 26, 1992) is an American former football offensive tackle. He was signed as an undrafted free agent by the Detroit Lions in 2014. He played college football at San Diego State University.

== Early life ==
Quigley played high school football, basketball, and golf for Granite Hills High School in Apple Valley, California.

== College career ==
Quigley played college football for the San Diego State Aztecs of the Mountain West Conference. He began his career as a tight end, but became a lineman in his junior year. He won All-Conference honorable mention for both of his final two years at San Diego State.

== Professional career ==
Due to a late college season foot injury and surgery Quigley was not selected in the 2014 NFL draft. In June 2014, after a tryout and medical clearance, he was signed as an undrafted free agent by the Detroit Lions. He was released by the Lions on August 26, 2014.

Quigley was signed to the San Diego Chargers' practice squad on December 4, 2014. He was waived on May 19, 2015.

Quigley signed with the Washington Redskins on June 9, 2015. He was waived on August 31, 2015.
