= Granite Hills High School =

Granite Hills High School may refer to:

- Granite Hills High School (Apple Valley, California)
- Granite Hills High School (El Cajon, California)
- Granite Hills High School (Porterville, California)
