= Apple Valley Inn =

Hotel located in Apple Valley, California, United States

Coordinates: 34.52186968252505°N 117.21640027351287°W

The Apple Valley Inn was a hotel and restaurant established in Apple Valley, California, to help developer Newton T. Bass attract wealthy land buyers to the southern California desert town. Bass and partner Bernard "Bud" Westlund owned Apple Valley Ranchos Land Development Co.

The inn, which opened on Thanksgiving Day 1948, is a landmark in the community and a prominent feature in the history of Apple Valley.

The inn was a popular vacation destination for Hollywood celebrities during the 1940s, 1950s, and 1960s. Frequent visitors included notable icons Bob Hope, Marilyn Monroe, John Wayne and Richard Nixon in its heyday. Entertainment for guests included such performers as cowgirl celebrity and famous trick roper, Texas Rose Bascom.

Jack Rogers, famed Country Western Singer, guitarist, and prolific composer, was frequently performing at the Inn during the sixties. He was a close friend and compatriot of “Newt” (the owner), Roy Rogers, Gene Autry, Bob Hope, etc. Richard Nixon took a liking to Jack and his music and would go into the bar at night and each night request Jack play and sing “El Paso” which of course he accommodated.

The inn originally allowed only white Christians as patrons. Apple Valley Ranchos Land established racial policies in its covenants, conditions and restrictions (CC&Rs) dated Feb 14, 1946. The restrictions were increasingly relaxed throughout the 1950s as GI Bill money was used to purchase property.

In 1954, screenwriter and producer Roger Corman set part of his movie Highway Dragnet at the inn with extensive shots of the lobby, pool and exterior scenes. In 1956, director Douglas Sirk and producer Ross Hunter utilized the same features as the 'Palm Valley Inn' in the film There's Always Tomorrow.

In 1965, movie stars Roy Rogers and Dale Evans and their family became residents of Apple Valley. Roy Rogers leased the inn and restaurant, which was then renamed Roy Rogers' Apple Valley Inn. The Outdoor Steak Fry and the Roy Rogers' Riding Stables, with its haywagon rides and horseback riding, were two popular enterprises attached to the inn. Mel Marion and then Billy Bascom managed the stables. Cowboy artist Earl Bascom and his artist son John worked there from time to time. Roy Rogers' personal horse, Trigger Junior, was frequently boarded at the riding stables.

After many successful years, the inn closed to the public in 1987. It was purchased by the Lakritz Partnership in November 2003 and restored.
