= Reserve Oil and Gas Company =

American petroleum company (1932–1980)

- Industry: Petroleum
- Founded: March 16, 1932
- Defunct: January 23, 1980
- Fate: Acquired by Getty Oil
- Headquarters: San Francisco (1932–64); Los Angeles (1964–78); Denver (1978–80)

The Reserve Oil and Gas Company was an American independent petroleum company that existed from 1932 to 1980. Reserve was incorporated in California and began its life with operations in that state. It remained a relatively small company until the 1960s, when it undertook a series of major acquisitions. By the late 1970s, Reserve was one of the largest independents in North America, with production in 16 states and the four western provinces of Canada.

Reserve was based in San Francisco in its formative years, and in 1964, it moved to Los Angeles. In April 1973, Reserve acquired Western Crude Oil, Inc. of Denver, and in January 1974, Reserve's president opened a general operating office in that city. In January 1978, the company's head and executive offices transferred to Denver from Los Angeles. Reserve was acquired in January 1980 by Getty Oil for $631 million.

== History ==
Reserve was formed on March 16, 1932, jointly by the Lincoln Petroleum Corporation and the investment bank Mitchum, Tully & Co. At its inception, Reserve held 1,700 acres in Yolo County, California, a prospective gas field. Lincoln had been founded in 1928 as the Lincoln Drilling Company (a California corporation). Its assets were taken over in 1931 by the Lincoln Petroleum Corporation, Ltd. (a Delaware corporation), whose assets were taken over in 1936 by the Lincoln Petroleum Company (a California corporation). In May 1956, Lincoln was acquired by the Great Basin Petroleum Company of Denver.

Reserve's first president was Robert Ellis Bering (1896–1960), who was also president of Lincoln Petroleum. In 1934, Jasper William Tully (1891–1972) became president.

In October 1963, John Robertson McMillan (1909–1992) succeeded Tully to become the company's third president, while Tully became chairman of the board. McMillan hailed from Burlington, Vermont and graduated Bachelor of Science from the California Institute of Technology in 1931. He began his career with the Barnsdall Oil Company, then joined the Fullerton Oil Company in 1943. Fullerton was acquired by the Monterey Oil Company in 1954, with whom McMillan continued. In 1957, McMillan became the first president of the Transwestern Pipeline Company, which was formed by Monterey. In 1960 Monterey was acquired by Humble Oil, with whom McMillan remained until he joined Reserve in 1963.

In November 1965, the company announced a plan to acquire the Apple Valley Building and Development Company, which owned 9,000 acres in fee in Apple Valley, California. The acquisition had received approval from both companies' directors. Shareholders of both companies voted in favor of the merger the following March. The purchase was completed in late April, and on May 2, Reserve elected Newton T. Bass, formerly president of Apple Valley, as its chairman, succeeding Tully. Also in November 1965, Reserve acquired the Long Beach Dock and Terminal Company for $3.5 million. The assets of Long Beach included nine warehouses in the Port of Long Beach and several producing wells in the Wilmington Oil Field.

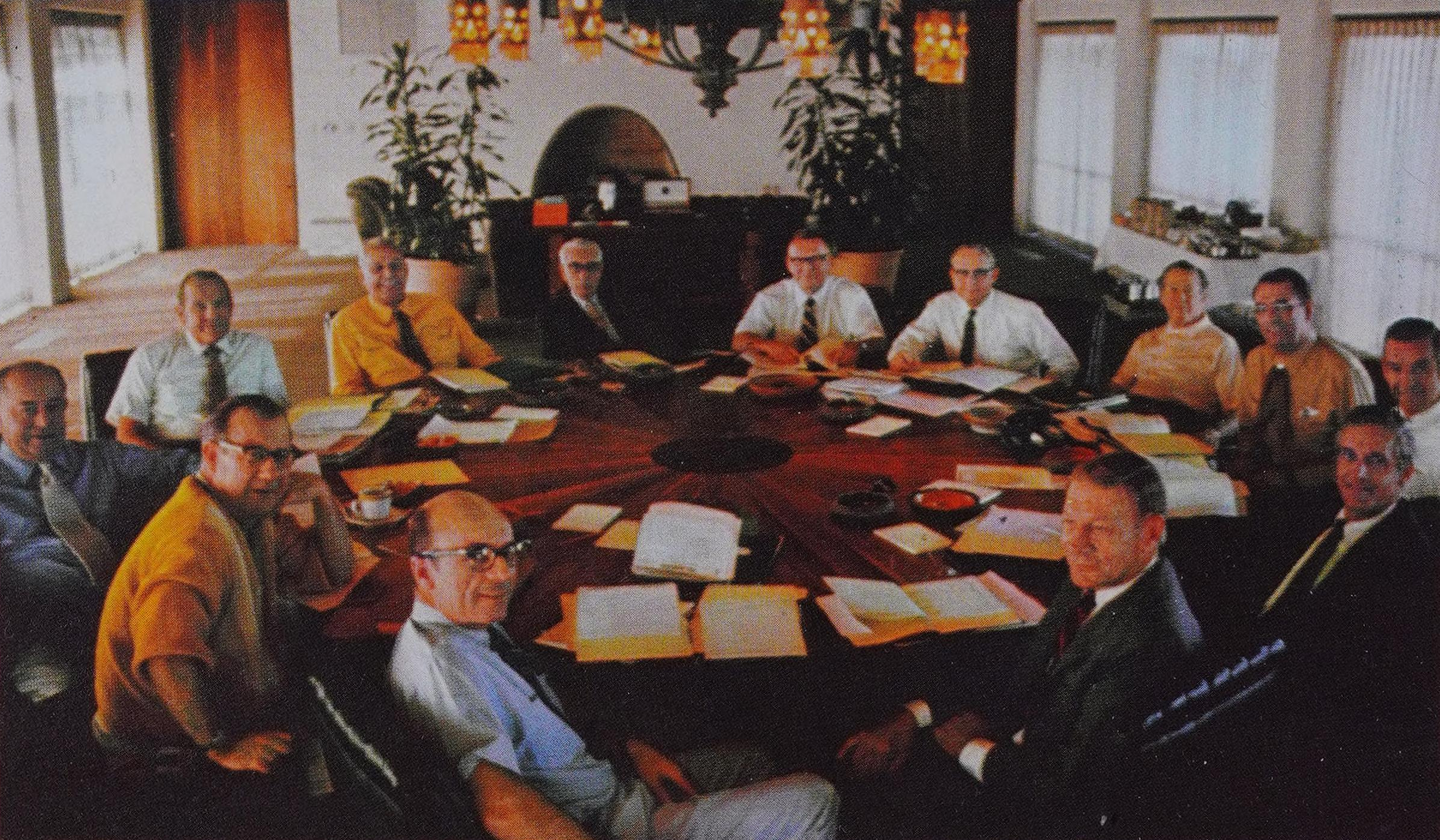
The board of directors meets in 1970 at the Newton T. Bass House in Apple Valley.

In September 1967, Reserve purchased a block of 2.3 million shares of Fargo Oils Ltd. – an Alberta corporation formed on November 20, 1950 – from the General American Oil Company of Texas. The block, which comprised 24 per cent of Fargo's 8.5 million shares, allowed Reserve to enter the Canadian market. In March 1968, shareholders of Reserve and Fargo voted on a takeover plan. Shareholders of both companies voted in favor of the plan, which saw the exchange of approximately $48 million of shares. On June 10, 1968, the takeover was completed. Subsequently, in May 1969, Fargo was renamed Canadian Reserve Oil and Gas Ltd.

In December 1973, Bass stepped down as chairman of the board to become chairman emeritus. He was succeeded by President McMillan, who in turn was succeeded as president by Paul Dwain Meadows (1926–1999). Meadows was a native of Niotaze, Kansas, and after serving in the United States Army Air Forces in World War II, graduated Bachelor of Science from the New Mexico Institute of Mining and Technology in 1952. Meadows began his career in 1952 with the Honolulu Oil Corporation and stayed with the company until its sale to the Standard Oil Company (Indiana) in 1961. That year, he joined James A. Lewis Engineering in Dallas, then joined Reserve in 1966. In 1968, he had been appointed president of Canadian Reserve, and held this post until the company's sale in 1980.

Effective January 15, 1978, Reserve transferred its executive office from Los Angeles to Denver. The move was made to shorten lines of communication with its two Denver-based subsidiaries, Reserve Oil, Inc., and Western Crude Oil, Inc., and to consolidate the office of president and chief executive officer with other principal officers. The offices of the chairman and corporate secretary remained in Los Angeles.

In August 1979, Canadian mining company Denison Mines signed a letter of intent to acquire Reserve for $525 million. However, that October, Getty Oil submitted a rival offer to buy Reserve for $631 million. Reserve began talks with Getty, and at the end of October Denison dropped its bid. On January 23, 1980, the takeover was completed, bringing an end to Reserve after a nearly 48-year history.

The acquisition, a key component of which was Reserve's Canadian subsidiary, was complicated by the requirement to apply to Canada's Foreign Investment Review Agency. Getty's application to purchase Canadian Reserve was rejected in March 1981. In May 1982, Getty filed a second application to acquire Canadian Reserve. This application was approved in September 1982. Following the takeover of Getty by Texaco in early 1984, later that year, Texaco Canada acquired Canadian Reserve. Texaco Canada was acquired by Imperial Oil in 1989, at which point Canadian Reserve came under the latter's control. Canadian Reserve remains a registered corporate entity owned by Imperial.

== Leadership ==
=== President ===
1. Robert Ellis Bering, 1932–1934
2. Jasper William Tully, 1934–1963
3. John Robertson McMillan, 1963–1973
4. Paul Dwain Meadows, 1973–1980

=== Chairman of the Board ===
1. Jasper William Tully, 1963–1966
2. Newton Thornberry Bass, 1966–1973
3. John Robertson McMillan, 1973–1980
