= Parallel Universes: A Memoir from the Edges of Space and Time =

Book by Linda Morabito Meyer

Parallel Universes, a Memoir from the Edges of Space and Time
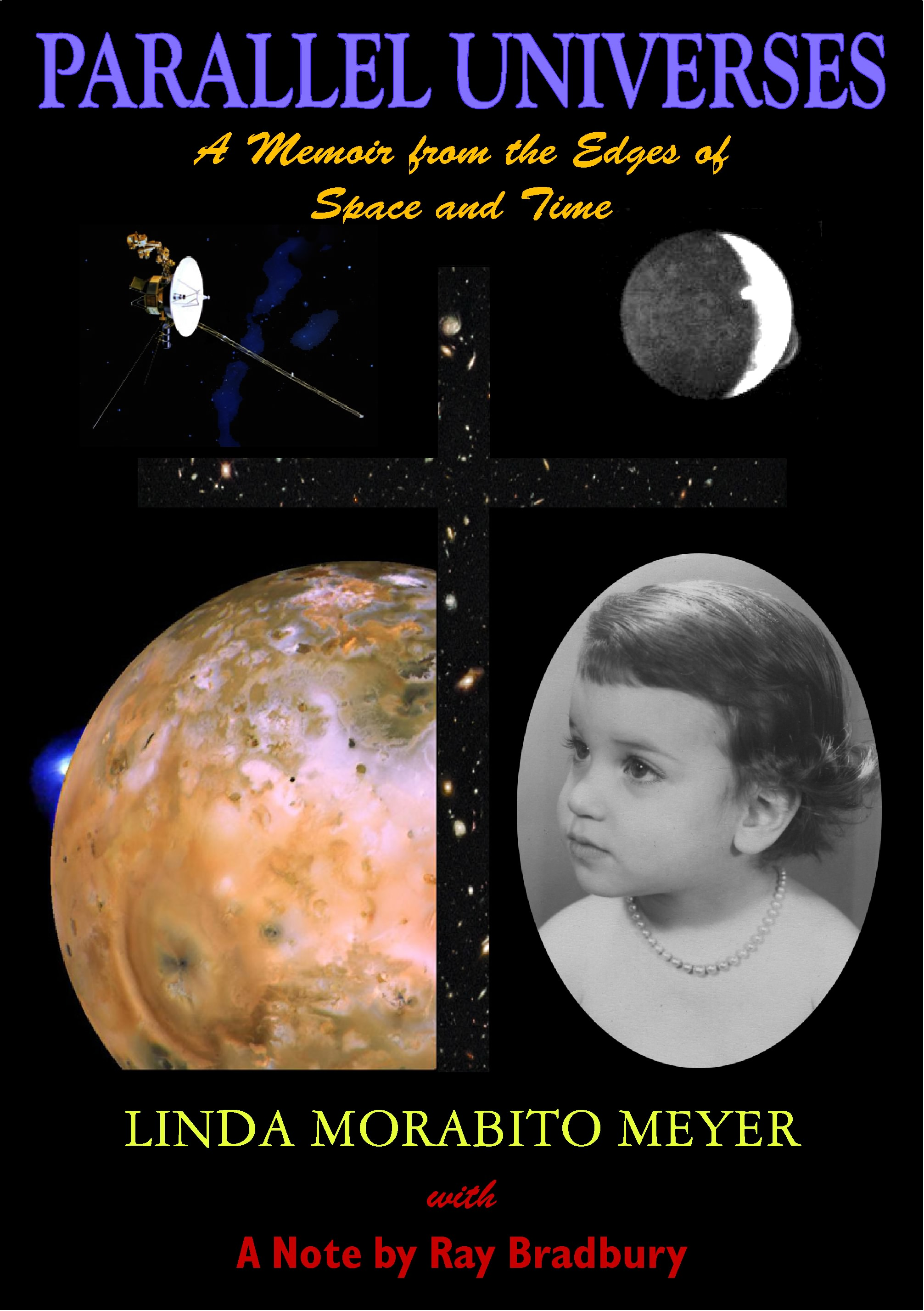
- Author: Linda Morabito Meyer

Parallel Universes, A Memoir from the Edges of Space and Time is a Christian non-fiction book and a personal and scientific memoir written by Linda Morabito Meyer, the NASA discoverer of volcanic activity on Jupiter's Io. The book documents the author's several near-death experiences and purported visits to Heaven between 1954 and 1956; the author's quest to uncover a hidden past from 2003 to 2011; and the events of the author's major discovery in 1979.

== Summary ==
While writing the memoir, a fifty-year-old mystery in Morabito Meyer's life was solved. She discovered that her parents had been members of the Temple of the Abundant Life in Vancouver, British Columbia, Canada, led by a convicted criminal who was wanted on outstanding warrants in the United States. William Franklin Wolsey posed as a Bishop in this cult and was the target of investigative reporting by the Vancouver Sun newspaper. The author's memories of horrific childhood abuse documented in the book corresponded to events reported in the news in 1959, which she realized after finding out about the cult. This information is summarized in the book's epilogue. Her memories included near-death experiences as a result of her parents’ involvement with William Franklin Wolsey, in which she remembers visiting Heaven and seeing Jesus. Meyer maintains that Wolsey was responsible for the deaths of four children, whose deaths she witnessed. Meyer, who moved to the United States with her parents in 1961, became an astronomer and worked for NASA's Jet Propulsion Laboratory on NASA's Voyager mission to Jupiter, discovered the volcanic activity on Jupiter's moon Io in 1979. The memoir interweaves the author's remarkable science, personal, and religious experiences.

The book interweaves three journeys told in Morabito Meyer's own words. She expresses her love of astronomy, which led her to the discovery of the volcanic activity on Io in 1979. The discovery is considered the greatest of NASA's planetary exploration program.

She expresses the horror of a childhood scarred by her parents' involvement with a Vancouver, British Columbia, Canada cult between of 1954 and 1956. To aid victims of childhood abuse, the author highlights a treatment used for post traumatic stress disorder.

== Kindle release ==
On November 16, 2010, Linda Morabito Meyer made an early version of the book available in the Amazon Kindle electronic format, with the ability for the public to update the book through Amazon.com at no charge, as Morabito Meyer's investigation into her past was completed. The Kindle version was updated to reflect the final version of the book, which was released in paperback on October 13, 2011.
