= Apple Valley High School (California) =

Public high school in California, United States

Location
- 11837 Navajo Rd; Apple Valley, California 92308; United States; 34°27′59″N 117°11′18″W

Information
- Type: Public secondary
- Motto: SunDevil Pride is Contagious!
- Established: 1967
- School district: Apple Valley Unified School District
- Principal: Brian Goodrow
- Teaching staff: 87.67 (FTE)
- Grades: 9–12
- Enrollment: 2,163 (2023-2024)
- Student to teacher ratio: 24.67
- Colors: Orange, Black, White
- Mascot: SunDevil
- Accreditation: 6 Year WASC Accreditation (the maximum possible)
- Website: sites.google.com/avusd.org/apple

Apple Valley High School (AVHS) is a public four-year high school located in Apple Valley, California, United States. It is a part of the Apple Valley Unified School District. Built in 1967, it was the only comprehensive high school in the Town of Apple Valley until 1999 when Granite Hills High School opened. The campus has expanded with growth and was modernized with local bond funds in 2002.

== Mascot ==
The school's mascot, Sparky the SunDevil, has been the center of controversy for many years. Over the history of the school, the character of the SunDevil has increasingly become more cartoon-like, as parents were upset with the Satanic references.

== Athletics ==
In football, the Sun Devils compete annually against the Victor Valley High School Jackrabbits in the "Bell Game". The Bell game has been played since 1969 and as of 2010 Apple Valley led the overall series 27-14. Apple Valley has won 10 straight Bell Games since 2010.

== Alumni ==
- Chris Brymer (football player)
- Jayden Denegal (football player)
- Napoleon D'umo (choreographer, creative director)
- Cuba Gooding Jr. (actor)
- Erik Robertson (football player)
- Jason Thompson (baseball player)
- Jason Vargas (baseball player)
