= There's Always Tomorrow (1956 film) =

1956 film by Douglas Sirk

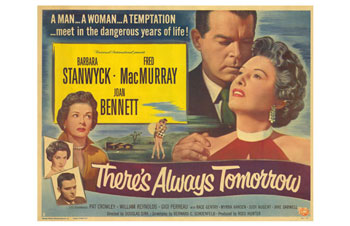
- Film poster by Reynold Brown
- Directed by: Douglas Sirk
- Screenplay by: Bernard C. Schoenfeld
- Based on: There's Always Tomorrow novel by Ursula Parrott
- Produced by: Ross Hunter
- Starring: Barbara Stanwyck; Fred MacMurray; Joan Bennett; William Reynolds; Pat Crowley; Gigi Perreau
- Cinematography: Russell Metty
- Edited by: William Morgan
- Music by: Herman Stein; Heinz Roemheld
- Color process: Black and white
- Production company: Universal Pictures
- Distributed by: Universal International
- Release date: January 8, 1956
- Running time: 84 minutes
- Country: United States
- Language: English
- Box office: $1 million

There's Always Tomorrow is a 1956 American romantic melodrama film directed by Douglas Sirk and starring Barbara Stanwyck, Fred MacMurray and Joan Bennett. The screenplay by Bernard C. Schoenfeld was adapted from the novel of the same name by Ursula Parrott. The plot concerns a man's unhappiness with his domestic life and romantic relationship with a former employee. The film was produced by Ross Hunter for Universal Pictures, which had also produced the 1934 adaptation of Parrott's novel. It was released in the United States on January 8, 1956.

== Plot ==
Toy manufacturer Clifford Groves lives a routine life in Pasadena. His three adolescent children, son Vinnie and daughters Ellen and Frankie, and his wife Marion pay him little attention. One night while Cliff is alone at home, Norma Miller, one of his first employees whom he has not seen for 20 years, makes a surprise visit. They go to the theater, using tickets that Cliff had bought for Marion and himself. Leaving at intermission, they retreat to Cliff's office, where they reminisce. Norma reveals that she is a divorced dress designer and is in town to speak at a conference in nearby Palm Valley. After making plans to see each other before Norma returns to New York, they separate.

Later in the week, Cliff and Marion are set to embark on a weekend trip to Palm Valley, but Marion does not want to leave Frankie, who has a sprained ankle. Marion urges Cliff to make the trip alone, and he reluctantly agrees so that he can keep a meeting with an important buyer. At the resort, Cliff encounters Norma, who has remained at the resort following the conference. They engage in horseback riding, swimming and dancing. Cliff's meeting with the buyer is canceled.

Vinnie drives his girlfriend Ann and two friends to Palm Valley to swim in the resort's pool. While there, he learns that the buyer is not there, overhears some innuendo about Cliff and Norma and sees them in Norma's room. Vinnie suspects that Cliff is having an affair and leaves without being seen by him.

Back at home, Vinnie tells Ellen about his suspicions. Ann cannot believe that Cliff would be unfaithful, and it appears that she may be correct when Cliff returns home and is honest about his trip. Marion suggests that Cliff invite Norma to dinner the next evening. Norma accidentally spills the contents of her purse, revealing that she carries an old picture of herself with Cliff. The dinner takes an awkward turn when Vinnie abruptly leaves and Ellen refuses to speak, but Ann makes excuses to the adults. Norma invites Marion to visit the dress shop where she works.

After Norma leaves, Cliff tells Marion that he feels neglected and has grown tired of his unadventurous life. Cliff later calls Norma and arranges to see her the next evening, but Vinnie overhears the conversation. Cliff lies to Marion that he has a business meeting.

Marion and Ann visit Norma at the dress shop, and Ann tries to speak with Norma but cannot convey her message. However, Norma senses what Ann wanted to discuss and agrees to speak with her rather than meeting Cliff. He visits her hotel anyway and declares his love; she initiates their first kiss but tearfully asks him to wait until the next day for her response. In the meantime, Vinnie and Ellen visit Norma and ask her to return to New York. Norma angrily conveys Cliff's point of view, pointing out that his family may have been neglecting him, but Ellen tearfully begs Norma to not wreck their family.

Norma visits Cliff at his office to inform him that she is leaving. She admits that she had vanished 20 years ago because she loved him, but that they could not be happy together because he has a good life and would regret abandoning his family. Ignoring his objections, she departs for the airport.

Cliff returns home and watches Norma's plane flying overhead. Marion asks if he is feeling better, having noticed his recent change of mood, and he says that he is "alright now."

== Cast ==
- Barbara Stanwyck as Norma Vale (née Miller)
- Fred MacMurray as Clifford Groves
- Joan Bennett as Marion Groves
- William Reynolds as Vinnie Groves
- Pat Crowley as Ann
- Gigi Perreau as Ellen Groves
- Jane Darwell as Mrs. Rogers
- Race Gentry as Bob
- Myrna Hansen as Ruth
- Judy Nugent as Frances "Frankie" Groves
- Paul Smith as Bellboy
- Helen Kleeb as Miss Walker
- Jane Howard as Flower Girl
- Frances Mercer as Ruth Doran
- Sheila Bromley as Woman From Pasadena
- Dorothy Bruce as Sales Manager
- Hermine Sterler as Tourist's Wife
- Fred Nurney as Tourist
- Hal Smith as The Bartender
- Jean Byron as Miss Byron, Saleswoman (uncredited)

== Production notes ==
This film was Universal's second adaptation of Ursula Parrott's novel. The earlier film, directed by Edward Sloman, provided a rare early leading role for Frank Morgan and featured Binnie Barnes in the Stanwyck role and Lois Wilson in the Bennett role.

MacMurray and Stanwyck had costarred in three previous films: the Remember the Night (1940), Double Indemnity (1944) and The Moonlighter (1953).

Douglas Sirk wanted his version of There's Always Tomorrow to be filmed in color, but Universal refused. However, the studio granted Sirk's request to hire cinematographer Russell Metty.

The scenes in the film set at the fictional Palm Valley Inn were filmed at the Apple Valley Inn in Apple Valley, California.

== Reception ==
=== Contemporary reviews ===
In a review for The New York Times, critic Bosley Crowther wrote: "Have mercy on Dad. That's the thesis of Universal's 'There's Always Tomorrow,' a little tale of domestic relations ... [T]he moral (if not the picture) is worth broadcasting: For Pete's sake, have mercy on Dad—especially if you are contemplating taking him to see this film."

Critic Mae Tinee of the Chicago Tribune wrote: " This film is a plea for poor old pop. Don't treat him like a walking bank, don't monopolize his telephone, and don't be too sure that he always will be around the house, kids, or you may be in for a rude awakening. ... The film is not a bad reflection of conditions prevalent in many homes. Let's hope the 'other woman' presented in this case has many counterparts; otherwise the divorce courts will be busier than ever."

=== Modern evaluation ===
Leonard Maltin's Movie Guide awarded There's Always Tomorrow 2½ stars out of 4, calling it a "sudsy but well-acted soap opera", while Steven H. Scheuer's Movies on TV gave it 3 stars out of 4, describing it as a "mordant, intelligent soaper." TimeOut Film Guide stated that the film is "a brilliant example of his [Sirk's] mastery of lacerating irony," concluding that Stanwyck's "generically-correct fairytale 'sacrifice' of self to the sanctity of the family, and the sanctioned role of the independent woman, merely intensifies the romantic agony of both dreamer victims. Tomorrow never comes." Assigning the film 3½ stars out of 5, The Motion Picture Guide described it as "another of director Sirk's melodramatic, bitter attacks on the values of American middle-class life in the 1950s."

The film has received critical acclaim from modern-day critics. On Rotten Tomatoes, it has an approval rating of 86% based on seven reviews, with an average score of 7.3/10.

== Home media ==
Universal first released There's Always Tomorrow on DVD in 2010 as part of its The Barbara Stanwyck Collection, but in a full-frame aspect ratio and with a shortened runtime of 81 minutes.

In 2015, Universal released the film as a standalone DVD in its original widescreen aspect ratio and with the original 84-minute runtime. This version was also included in a 2018 TCM Barbara Stanwyck DVD set.

On August 25, 2020, There's Always Tomorrow was released on Blu-ray in North America for the first time by Kino Lorber Studio Classics, which licensed the film from Universal.

DVD and Blu-ray releases of the film on the international market use a slightly different widescreen transfer, and some feature a textless version of the trailer (full frame) as a bonus feature.

== See also ==
- List of American films of 1956
- There's Always Tomorrow (1934 film)
