= Academy for Academic Excellence =

Coordinates: 34.5328286°N 117.2787523°W

The Lewis Center For Educational Research

Location
- 17500 Mana Road; Apple Valley, California; United States

Information
- Established: 1997
- Founder: Rick Piercy
- School district: Apple Valley Unified School District
- Faculty: 62.82 (FTE)
- Grades: TK-12
- Enrollment: 1,447 (2018-19)
- Student to teacher ratio: 23.03
- Campus: Mojave River Campus
- Colors: Blue; White; Orange
- Mascot: Knights
- Nickname: AAE
- Website: aae.lewiscenter.org

The Academy for Academic Excellence (AAE) is a K-12 public charter school based in Apple Valley, California. It is part of the Lewis Center for Educational Research (LCER), named for a major supporter, then Congressman Jerry Lewis. The school was first chartered in 1997 by the Apple Valley Unified School District. LCER currently operates two TK-12 campuses - the Mojave River Campus in Apple Valley, and the Norton Science and Language Academy in San Bernardino, California.

== GAVRT Project ==
In its capacity under the Lewis Center for Educational Research, AAE is involved in a partnership with NASA, the Jet Propulsion Laboratory, and Apple Valley Unified School District in the Goldstone Apple Valley Radio Telescope project. Students at AAE have the opportunity to conduct radio astronomy observations using internet connection to control a 34-meter antenna at NASA's Deep Space Network Goldstone Complex.

== JROTC Program ==
In 2007, AAE became the only public charter school in the state of California with an AFJROTC program, instructed by Colonel George Armstrong, (former U.S Air Force Pilot) (Ret) and Master Sergeant Harold Padua (Ret). By 2021, one fourth of AAE high school students were enrolled in the AFJROTC program.

In 2021, the AFJROTC program was one of only ten programs nationwide to be selected for conversion to the inaugural cohort of the United States Space Force JROTC.

== Awards ==
AAE received a California Distinguished School Award in 2007.
