= Newton T. Bass =

American businessman (1903–1983)

- Born: October 28, 1903; Argentine, Kansas
- Died: February 6, 1983 (aged 79); Apple Valley, California
- Spouse(s): May Loretta Pigott (m. 1922; died 1933) Virginia Westlund (m. 1939) Frances A. Emmi (m. 1964)

Newton Thornberry Bass (October 28, 1903 – February 6, 1983), was a prolific oil executive and a key figure in the growth of Apple Valley, California, United States. He and partner Bernard "Bud" Westlund owned Apple Valley Ranchos Land Development Co. Begun in 1946, the company was the beginning of the development that became the incorporated Town of Apple Valley, CA.

== Early life ==
Bass was born in South Dakota and grew up on an Indian reservation. He was the son of Charlotte Lee Spinsby and Lewis Claude Bass who was a descendant of John Bass of the Nansemond Indian tribe of Virginia.

Newton Bass married May Loretta Pigott (1904-1933) in 1922. He married Virginia Westlund (1914-1986) in 1939.

== Oil career ==
Bass was an executive with numerous oil firms, including Hobbs Petroleum, Loma Verde Oil Company, and Riviera Petroleum Company, and in 1965 he merged Riviera Petroleum into the publicly traded Pacific Enterprises group in a $25 million stock deal. From 1966 to 1973, Bass was chairman of the Reserve Oil and Gas Company.

== Land developer ==
Newton T. Bass was also involved in the development of the Hollywood Riviera Section of the City of Torrance in the early 1930s.

== Residence ==
Bass' hilltop house on what is now Bass Hill in Apple Valley had architectural significance and was one of the scenes of the Perry Mason TV episode, "The Case of the Roving River." Following a devastating, arson attributed fire In 1967, the structure was rebuilt and repurposed as an entertainment venue owned by the Apple Valley Ranchos Land Development Company.

The house, after falling into disrepair, was purchased by the Town of Apple Valley in 2016. In 2017, the house became part of the Town of Apple Valley Parks system and a committee was established to determine the future of the historic property. On March 22, 2022, the town council voted unanimously to demolish the structure with the intent to build an observation deck in its place.

Bass also resided in the Los Cerritos neighborhood of Long Beach, California.

Formed in August 2012, the Apple Valley Legacy Trail (AVLT) Committee would eventually partner with the Town of Apple Valley, October 2014 to pursue a Land Water Conservation Fund grant administered by National Park Service. Utilizing the AVLT existing: Vision-Proposal, Name, Feasibility Study, Interpretive Narratives, Before and After Site Concepts, Architectural Renderings, facebook page and all embedded within the core matrix of the land acquisition grant, this public/private co op (Town Resolution 2014-41 & 42) landed the Hilltop House property in a very competitive field of worthy projects throughout California. "Reclaim" Phase 1 accomplished May 2016.

== Legacy ==
The following public structures are named for Bass:

- Apple Valley Newton T. Bass Branch Library in Apple Valley, California opened in 1946
- Newton T. Bass Stadium serves the Apple Valley Unified School District
