= Lewis Center for Educational Research =

Coordinates: 34.5311°N 117.2778°W

The Lewis Center for Educational Research (LCER) is an educational organization located in Apple Valley, California. It operates two charter schools: the Academy for Academic Excellence in Apple Valley, and the Norton Science and Language Academy in San Bernardino.

== Goldstone-Apple Valley Radio Telescope ==
The Goldstone-Apple Valley Radio Telescope (GAVRT) Program is a partnership between NASA’s Jet Propulsion Laboratory (JPL) and the Lewis Center for Educational Research. Based in California, GAVRT provides a science investigation program for students K through 12. Students learn how to be part of a science team while they are making a real contribution to scientific knowledge by operating and collecting data on current NASA JPL missions to moons and planets in the Solar System.
