= Granite Hills High School (Apple Valley, California) =

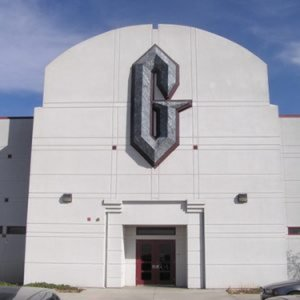

Location
- 22900 Esaws Rd; Apple Valley, California; United States; 34.509°N 117.1658°W

Information
- Type: Public secondary
- Motto: "Be Respectful, Be Safe, Be Accountable."
- Established: 1999
- School district: Apple Valley Unified School District
- Principal: Adam Powell
- Teaching staff: 76.95 (FTE)
- Grades: 9-12
- Enrollment: 1,734 (2023-2024)
- Student to teacher ratio: 22.53
- Color
- Mascot: Cougar
- Nickname: Cougs
- Rival: Apple Valley High School
- Accreditation: 3-Year WASC
- Newspaper: The Granite Planet
- Website: sites.google.com/avusd.org/granitehillshighschool-new/

Granite Hills High School is a public high school located in Apple Valley, California and is part of the Apple Valley Unified School District. The school was established in 1999 to relieve pressure on the crowded Apple Valley High School.

== Sports ==
The school's sports teams are called Granite Hills Cougars and compete in the Desert Sky League of the CIF Southern Section. The school has been competing in the Desert Sky League since 2000.

== Notable alumni ==
- Michelle Alozie – professional footballer in the NWSL and on the Nigerian women's national team
- Bryce Quigley (class of 2010) — NFL offensive lineman
