= Lucerne Valley Unified School District =

School district in Lucerne Valley, California

Location
- Lucerne Valley, California High Desert Lucerne Valley, San Bernardino County; United States

District information
- Type: School district
- Grades: K–12
- Schools: 3

Other information
- Website: www.lucernevalleyusd.org

Lucerne Valley Unified School District is a school district headquartered in Lucerne Valley, California.

The district has most of the Lucerne Valley census-designated place.

Lucerne Valley Unified School District operates three school campuses run by Lucerne Valley Unified School District. Lucerne Valley Elementary School, built in 1952, serves grades K–5. Lucerne Valley Middle School was built in 1986 and formerly served grades 6–8. Lucerne Valley High School was built in 1992 and serve grades 6–12 after merging the portables from the prior middle school site onto the campus in 1998. The high school's first graduating class was in 1995. The school district office, community day school, and Mountain View High School have moved into the former Lucerne Valley Middle School site in the 2000s.

== History ==
The Lucerne Valley Unified School District has had difficulty circa 2015 with financial issues, and the 2013 test scores lower than average test scores compared to San Bernardino County schools. The school district reported a student population of fewer than 800 pupils as of September 2015.

In 2021, during the COVID-19 pandemic in California, the California Department of Public Health granted the district a permission waiver to open Lucerne Valley Elementary School for hybrid learning. At the time it was the only school in the county to get said permission. The student population in the district increased by 58 in the 2020-2021 school year because some parents liked the district's COVID policies. Ordinarily the State of California would increase funding for the district for adding students, but such money did not come. The superintendent stated that this meant $500,000 fewer dollars.
