= Apple Valley, California =

Town in California, United States

- Town
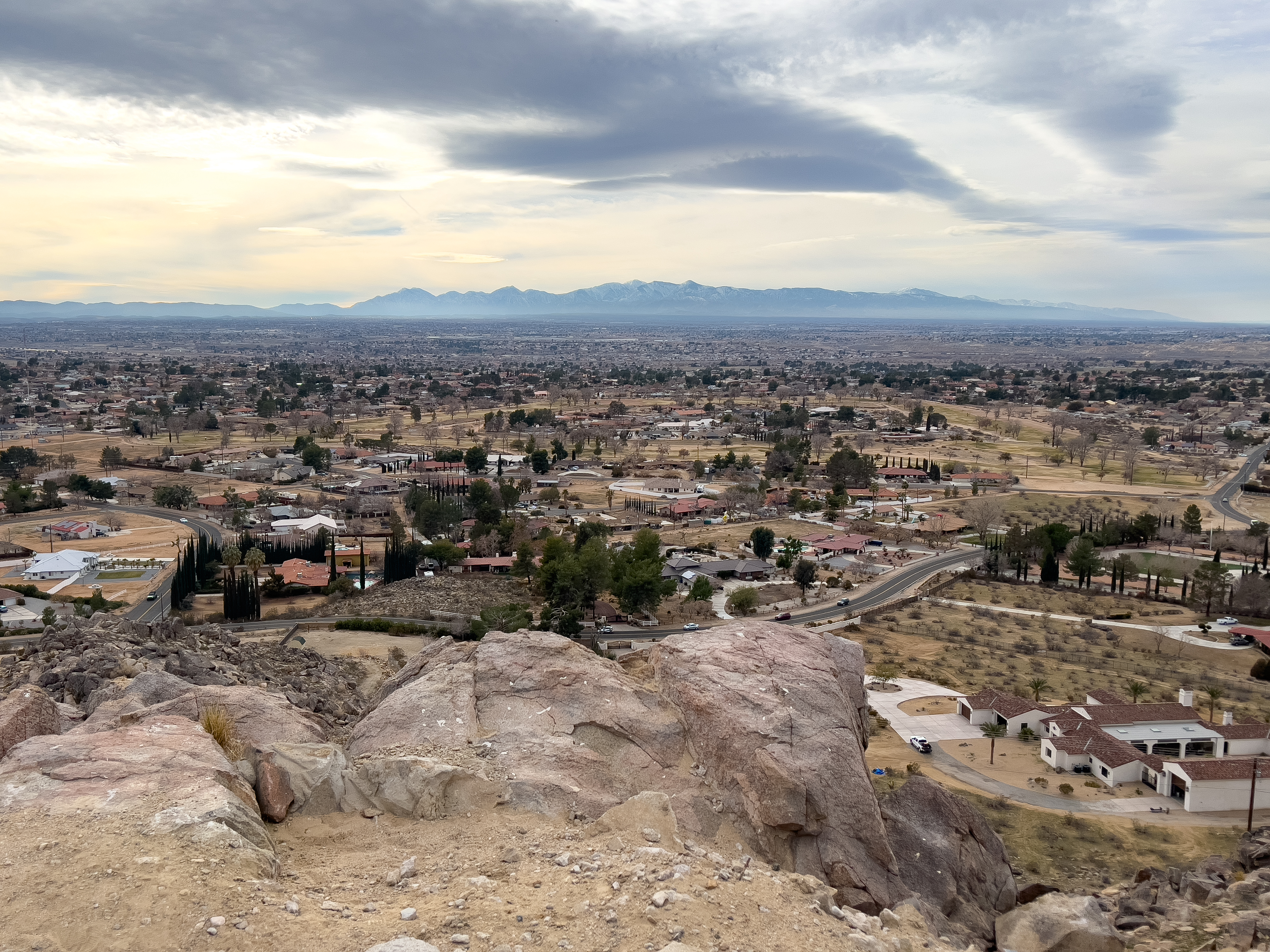
- Apple Valley, California viewed from Bass Hill

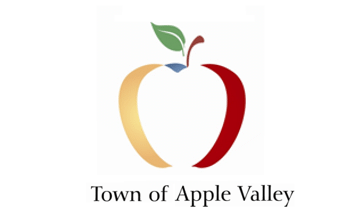
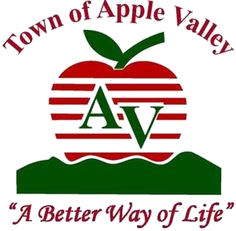
- Flag Seal
- Nickname: "Apple of the Desert"
- Motto: "A Better Way of Life"
- Interactive map of Apple Valley, California
- Location in California Apple Valley (California) Apple Valley (the United States)
- Coordinates: 34°32′03″N 117°12′18″W
- Country: United States
- State: California
- County: San Bernardino
- Incorporated: November 28, 1988
- Named for: The apple orchards grown during the town's founding

Government
  - Type: Council–manager
  - City council: Mayor Scott Nassif, Mayor Pro Tem Curt Emick, Art Bishop, Larry Cusack, and Kari Leon

Area
  - Total: 77.08 sq mi (199.63 km^{2})
  - Land: 77.00 sq mi (199.44 km^{2})
  - Water: 0.069 sq mi (0.18 km^{2}) 0.45%
- Elevation: 2,917 ft (889 m)

Population (2020)
  - Total: 75,791
  - Density: 984.2/sq mi (380.01/km^{2})
- Time zone: UTC-8 (Pacific Time Zone)
  - Summer (DST): UTC-7 (PDT)
- ZIP codes: 92307, 92308
- Area code: 442/760
- FIPS code: 06-02364
- GNIS feature ID: 2412372
- Website: www.applevalley.org

Apple Valley is an incorporated town in the Victor Valley of San Bernardino County, California, United States. Its population was 75,791 as of the 2020 United States census. The town is east of and adjoining to the neighboring cities of Victorville and Hesperia, 35 miles (56 km) south of Barstow, and 49 miles (79 km) north of San Bernardino through the Cajon Pass. It was incorporated on November 14, 1988, and is one of the 22 incorporated municipalities in California that use "town" in their names instead of "city".

== History ==
For centuries, Apple Valley was populated by Shoshonean, Paiute, Vanyume, Chemehuevi, and Serrano who were attracted to the water and vegetation around the Mojave River. The Mojave people came later and were the tribal group encountered in 1542 by a detachment of Coronado's men. These were the first Spanish to come to the Mojave desert.

Pedro Fages came through the area in 1772, looking for deserters. Father Francisco Garcés spent time in the area in 1776. He was on good terms with local tribes. He killed one of his mules to feed a group of starving Vanyumes. Garcés established a trail across the Mojave to the Colorado River passing through the Apple Valley area.

The area was explored by various Spanish gold seekers in the 18th and 19th centuries. Jedediah Smith established the Old Spanish Trail through the southern Mojave and Cajon Pass. Smith was in the area in 1826 and again in 1827.

Throughout the 19th century, Apple Valley became a thoroughfare of people traveling to Southern California for various reasons. Ute horse thieves, led by Chief Walkara, brought through an estimated 100,000 horses from their raids on the Lugo Rancho and San Gabriel Mission.

In 1848, members of the Mormon Battalion, mustered out of the U.S. Army after constructing the first wagon road across the southwest to San Diego and up to Los Angeles, brought 135 mules and the first wagon through the Cajon Pass up through the Mojave River Valley on the way to the Salt Lake Valley. Battalion leader Jefferson Hunt and a crew of cowboys followed the trail with the first cattle drive from Southern California to hungry members of the Church of Jesus Christ of Latter-day Saints in present-day Utah. Hunt led a Latter-day Saint group of settlers to the San Bernardino Valley in 1851.

In 1885, the railroad came northward through the Cajon Pass and established a train stop, calling it Victor (Victorville) on the Mojave River in the area then known as Mormon Crossing. John Brown helped build some of the first roads through Apple Valley, opening up freight and stagecoach travel from the mining camps at Gold Mountain and Holcomb Valley to the railroad. In the 1860s, LaFayette Mecham built the wagon road, a short-cut across the desert, now known as Stoddard Wells Road. Over the next few decades, Victorville boomed as the commercial center of the area with gold refineries, quarries, and dance halls and saloons, while Apple Valley remained more pastoral with ranches and apple orchards.

The Apple Valley name was officially recognized when a post office was established in 1949.

One well-known apple orchard was owned by Max Ihmsen, publisher of the Los Angeles Examiner newspaper. In 1915, he developed 320 acres (1.3 km^{2}) of apples and pears. The fame of Apple Valley spread as Ihmsen's fruit won many agricultural awards. In the late 1930s, Ihmsen's son-in-law, Cal Godshall, took over the business operations and made the ranch famous as the birthplace of California college rodeo with the first intercollegiate rodeo competition held in the United States.

Apple farming in the area started to decline about the time Ihmsen Ranch fruit production was at its prime. Water rates shot up with a switch to electric pumps. World War I took owners and workers away with the draft. During the Great Depression, many families left the mostly agricultural area looking for work. Washington and British Columbia apple growers had lower prices because they shipped their produce by river transportation, whereas Apple Valley apples were transported by rail or by truck. A series of outbreaks of a virulent fungal infection coupled with frost, heat, and hail in 1944, 1945, and 1946 ended commercial production.

A small orchard was maintained on the grounds of the Apple Valley Inn until it closed in 1986.

Apple Valley was home to Roy Rogers and Dale Evans, whose museum was first established in Apple Valley (in 1967) before the museum was relocated to Victorville in 1976. In 2003, the museum moved again, to Branson, Missouri. The move was made in hopes of reaching more fans; however, the museum closed for financial reasons on December 12, 2009.

== Geography ==
Apple Valley is located at the southern edge of the Mojave Desert. It is bordered by the cities of Victorville on the west and Hesperia on the southwest sides, with the unincorporated community of Lucerne Valley a distance to the east and the city of Barstow about 30 miles (48 km) to the north. Apple Valley, along with Victorville, Hesperia, Adelanto, and immediate surrounding areas, are commonly known as the Victor Valley. The primary thoroughfare through Apple Valley is State Route 18, which was given the moniker "Happy Trails Highway" within Apple Valley town limits, after the theme song of Roy Rogers and Dale Evans, who once resided on Outer Highway 18. The commercial area is split currently between State Route 18 and Bear Valley Road (the two roads are near parallel until they intersect in the east, outside of town). The Mojave River that borders the west side of Apple Valley flows south-to-north. The town is bounded on its southern edge by the foothills of the San Bernardino Mountains.

According to the United States Census Bureau, the town has a total area of 73.5 square miles (190 km^{2}), of which 73.2 square miles (190 km^{2}) are land and 0.3 square miles (0.78 km^{2}), or 0.45%, is covered by water.

The elevation of Apple Valley is about 2,900 ft (880 m) above sea level.

=== Climate ===
Apple Valley, California

Climate chart (precipitation, max. and min. temperature)
J	F	M	A	M	J	J	A	S	O	N	D
1.1 60 31	1.2 63 35	1.1 68 38	0.3 75 42	0.2 84 49	0.1 93 55	0.2 99 61	0.3 98 61	0.3 92 55	0.3 81 45	0.4 68 35	0.8 60 30
- █ Average max. and min. temperatures in °F
- █ Precipitation totals in inches
- Source: Weather.com / NWS
Metric conversion
J	F	M	A	M	J	J	A	S	O	N	D
28 16 −1	30 17 2	29 20 3	7.9 24 6	5.8 29 9	1.5 34 13	4.1 37 16	6.4 37 16	8.4 33 13	6.6 27 7	9.1 20 2	21 16 −1
- █ Average max. and min. temperatures in °C
- █ Precipitation totals in mm

According to the Köppen climate classification, Apple Valley has a semiarid climate (BSk). The city features cool winters and very hot, dry summers. Seasonal high winds occur occasionally in spring and fall.

- On average, the warmest month is July.
- The highest recorded temperature was 116 °F (47 °C) in 2002.
- On average, the coolest month is December.
- The lowest recorded temperature was −1 °F (−18 °C) in 1949.
- The most precipitation typically occurs in February.

== Demographics ==
Historical population
Census	Pop.	Note	%±
1970	6,702		—
1980	14,305		113.4%
1990	46,079		222.1%
2000	54,239		17.7%
2010	69,135		27.5%
2020	75,791		9.6%
2025 (est.)	75,247	▼	−0.7%
U.S. Decennial Census

=== Racial and ethnic composition ===
Apple Valley town, California – Racial and ethnic composition Note: the US Census treats Hispanic/Latino as an ethnic category. This table excludes Latinos from the racial categories and assigns them to a separate category. Hispanics/Latinos may be of any race.
Race / Ethnicity (NH = Non-Hispanic)	Pop. 2000	Pop. 2010	Pop. 2020	% 2000	% 2010	% 2020
White alone (NH)	36,710	38,374	33,991	67.68%	55.51%	44.85%
Black or African American alone (NH)	4,141	5,967	5,926	7.63%	8.63%	7.82%
Native American or Alaska Native alone (NH)	357	363	353	0.66%	0.53%	0.47%
Asian alone (NH)	1,167	1,934	2,433	2.15%	2.80%	3.21%
Native Hawaiian or Pacific Islander alone (NH)	101	265	219	0.19%	0.38%	0.29%
Other race alone (NH)	108	124	428	0.20%	0.18%	0.56%
Mixed race or Multiracial (NH)	1,588	1,952	3,452	2.93%	2.82%	4.55%
Hispanic or Latino (any race)	10,067	20,156	28,989	18.56%	29.15%	38.25%
Total	54,239	69,135	75,791	100.00%	100.00%	100.00%

=== 2020 census ===
As of the 2020 census, Apple Valley had a population of 75,791. The median age was 38.0 years. 25.3% of residents were under the age of 18 and 18.8% of residents were 65 years of age or older. For every 100 females there were 94.2 males, and for every 100 females age 18 and over there were 90.7 males age 18 and over.

95.8% of residents lived in urban areas, while 4.2% lived in rural areas.

There were 25,928 households in Apple Valley, of which 35.1% had children under the age of 18 living in them. Of all households, 50.1% were married-couple households, 15.9% were households with a male householder and no spouse or partner present, and 27.1% were households with a female householder and no spouse or partner present. About 20.9% of all households were made up of individuals and 12.1% had someone living alone who was 65 years of age or older. Of the town's households, 12,426 were occupied by families. 10,317 were married family units, 876 had a male householder with no spouse, and 1,233 had a female householder with no spouse.

There were 27,181 housing units, of which 4.6% were vacant. The homeowner vacancy rate was 1.9% and the rental vacancy rate was 4.4%. Average family size was 3.7 people, compared to 3.44 for the state of California. Homeownership rate was 65.5%, compared with 55.9% for California.

Racial composition as of the 2020 census
Race	Number	Percent
White	41,481	54.7%
Black or African American	6,311	8.3%
American Indian and Alaska Native	1,333	1.8%
Asian	2,609	3.4%
Native Hawaiian and Other Pacific Islander	275	0.4%
Some other race	12,413	16.4%
Two or more races	11,369	15.0%

=== Income and poverty ===
16.7% were living under the poverty line, compared with 12.3% for the state of California. Median income was $63,031, compared with $84,907 for California.

=== 2010 census ===
At the 2010 census, Apple Valley had a population of 69,135. The population density was 940.3 inhabitants per square mile (363.1/km^{2}). The racial makeup of Apple Valley was 47,762 (69.1%) White (55.5% non-Hispanic White), 6,321 (9.1%) African American, 779 (1.1%) Native American, 2,020 (2.9%) Asian, 294 (0.4%) Pacific Islander, 8,345 (12.1%) from other races, and 3,614 (5.2%) from two or more races. There were 20,156 residents of Hispanic or Latino ancestry, of any race (29.2%).

The census reported that 68,674 people (99.3% of the population) lived in households, 161 (0.2%) lived in noninstitutionalized group quarters, and 300 (0.4%) were institutionalized.

Of the 23,598 households, 9,169 (38.9%) had children under the age of 18 living in them, 12,647 (53.6%) were opposite-sex married couples living together, 3,550 (15.0%) had a female householder with no husband present, and 1,513 (6.4%) had a male householder with no wife present. The city had 1,582 (6.7%) unmarried opposite-sex partnerships and 177 (0.8%) same-sex married couples or partnerships; 4,743 households (20.1%) were one person and 2,429 (10.3%) had someone living alone who was 65 or older. The average household size was 2.91, with 17,710 families (75.0% of households); the average family size was 3.32.

The age distribution was 19,306 people (27.9%) under 18, 6,494 people (9.4%) 18 to 24, 15,068 people (21.8%) 25 to 44, 17,602 people (25.5%) 45 to 64, and 10,665 people (15.4%) who were 65 or older. The median age was 37.0 years. For every 100 females, there were 96.0 males. For every 100 females age 18 and over, there were 91.0 males.

The 26,117 housing units averaged 355.2 per square mile; of the occupied units, 16,297 (69.1%) were owner-occupied and 7,301 (30.9%) were rented. The homeowner vacancy rate was 4.0%; the rental vacancy rate was 10.0%, and 45,483 people (65.8% of the population) lived in owner-occupied housing units and 23,191 people (33.5%) lived in rental housing units.

During 2009–2013, Apple Valley had a median household income of $48,432, with 20.2% of the population living below the federal poverty line.

German, Irish, English, Italian and European are the most common ancestries. Spanish and Tagalog are the most common non-English languages.

== Economy ==
=== Top employers ===
According to Apple Valley's 2020 Comprehensive Annual Financial Report, the town's largest employers are:

#	Employer	# of Employees
1	Apple Valley Unified School District	1,574
2	St. Mary Regional Medical Center	1,301
3	Walmart Distribution Center	1,208
4	Target Stores	444
5	Big Lots	260
6	Jess Ranch Healthcare	181
7	WinCo Foods	176
8	Walmart Stores	152
9	Stater Bros. Markets	131
10	Lowe's	119

== Government ==
Apple Valley is governed by a town council. The mayor changes each December.

In the California State Legislature, Apple Valley is in the 19th senatorial district, represented by Republican Rosilicie Ochoa Bogh, and in the 34th Assembly district, represented by Republican Tom Lackey.

In the United States House of Representatives, Apple Valley is in California's 23rd Congressional District, represented by Republican Jay Obernolte.

== Education ==
Apple Valley Unified School District operates two comprehensive high schools (9–12) five TK–8 schools, and five TK–6 schools. One charter school offers transitional kindergarten to grade 12, and one private school offers preschool to grade 12.

=== High schools (9–12) ===
- Apple Valley High School
- Granite Hills High School
- High Desert Premier Academy (9–12)

=== Middle schools (K–8) ===
- Mariana Academy
- Phoenix Academy
- Sandia Academy
- Sitting Bull Academy
- Vanguard Preparatory

=== Elementary schools (K–6) ===
- Desert Knolls Elementary
- Rancho Verde Elementary
- Rio Vista Elementary
- Sycamore Rocks Elementary
- Yucca Loma Elementary

Charter Schools

- Academy for Academic Excellence - also known as "Lewis Center for Educational Research" (K–12)

=== Private schools ===
- Apple Valley Christian Academy (Pre–12)

== Infrastructure ==
=== Public safety ===
Law enforcement is provided by the San Bernardino County Sheriff's Department. Fire, rescue, and paramedic services are provided by the Apple Valley Fire Protection District. American Medical Response provides patient transportation via paramedic/EMT ambulances.

=== Cemeteries ===
The Sunset Hills Memorial Park and Mortuary was opened in 1995 on Waalew Road. Dale Evans and Roy Rogers are buried there.

=== Utilities ===
The town council started the process to take over the private water system in 2016.

== Notable people ==
- Michelle Alozie, American-born Nigerian professional footballer
- Pearl Bailey, singer-actress, and her husband, Louie Bellson, lived in Apple Valley for nearly a decade
- Earl W. Bascom, inventor, artist, sculptor, actor, Rodeo Hall of fame inductee, "Father of Modern Rodeo"
- Newton T. Bass, Reserve Oil and Gas Company executive, developer of Apple Valley Ranchos
- Chayce Beckham, singer, winner of American Idol (season 19)
- Louie Bellson, jazz drummer/VP of Remo, lived in Apple Valley for nearly a decade with wife, Pearl Bailey.
- Chris Blais, off-road motorcycle rider
- Angel Blue, soprano opera singer
- Victor Buono, actor, lived and died in Apple Valley.
- Billy Casper, professional golfer
- Jeff Chandler, actor, Broken Arrow; first Jewish man to purchase land in Apple Valley despite CC&R restrictions
- Van Conner, musician from rock band Screaming Trees
- Marty Dodson, singer-songwriter/producer, was born in Apple Valley
- Dock Ellis, MLB pitcher, was hospitalized at St. Mary's Hospital just prior to his death.
- Don Ferrarese, former MLB pitcher, owner of Apple Valley Land Company
- Cuba Gooding Jr., Oscar-winning actor, attended Apple Valley High School.
- Dan Henderson, mixed martial artist and Olympic wrestler
- John W. Henry, owner of Boston Red Sox, lived in Apple Valley during high school and college
- "Mad" Mike Hughes, daredevil and amateur-crewed rocketry enthusiast
- Miko Hughes, actor, Pet Sematary, Kindergarten Cop, Apollo 13
- Will James, artist, writer who lived on C Bar G Ranch
- Megan Jastrab, American professional cyclist and Olympian
- Herb Jeffries, actor and jazz singer, filmed several movies in Apple Valley at Murray's Dude Ranch
- Dave Lombardo, drummer for heavy metal band, Slayer
- Joe Louis, boxing champion, was a frequent vacationer to Murray's Dude Ranch in 1930s
- Joseph C. McConnell, top-scoring American jet ace, lived in Apple Valley until his death in an F-86H-1-NA crash
- Lloyd Mangrum, professional golfer and 1946 U.S. Open champion
- Mary Meade, actress, and her husband Richard "Dick" Bremerkamp, lived in Apple Valley from 1984 until their deaths
- Joseph Medina, BGen USMC, first Marine to command Navy Flotilla and Hispanic icon, Apple Valley HS graduate
- Richard Nixon, former U.S. President, spent three months at the home of founder Newton T. Bass in 1961 writing his first book, Six Crises
- Erik Robertson, football player
- Roy Rogers and Dale Evans, western singers, actors, co-founders of Sons of the Pioneers, lived in Apple Valley from 1965 until their deaths
- Smokey Rogers, western swing musician, singer, songwriter, entertainer, local KAVR radio personality
- Chris Smith, MLB player for Oakland Athletics
- Tim Spencer, western singer, actor, co-founder of Sons of the Pioneers
- Scout Taylor-Compton, actress in Rob Zombie's Halloween
- John Charles Thomas, opera singer, KAVR radio personality
- Jason Thompson, former MLB first baseman
- Lee Van Cleef, actor
- Jason Vargas (born 1983), pitcher for the Philadelphia Phillies
- Skip Young, actor, The Adventures of Ozzie and Harriet

== In popular culture ==
Apple Valley has a long and storied relationship with Hollywood production studios, and has been a filming location for many award-winning feature films, TV shows/movies, and commercials:

Feature films

- The Bronze Buckaroo (1939), starring Herb Jeffries, was filmed at Murray's Dude Ranch.
- Column South (1953), starring Audie Murphy, was filmed in Apple Valley and nearby Victorville.
- Divorce Invitation (2012)
- Eagle Eye (2008), starring Shia LaBeouf
- Four Guns To The Border (1954), starring Rory Calhoun and Walter Brennan
- Foxfire (1955), starring Jane Russell, was filmed at Apple Valley Inn.
- The Hard Ride (1971) was filmed at Oro Grande Wash and in nearby Lucerne Valley.
- Harlem on the Prairie (1937), starring Herb Jeffries, was filmed at Murray's Dude Ranch.
- Harlem Rides the Range (1939), starring Herb Jeffries, was filmed at Murray's Dude Ranch.
- Highway Dragnet (1954), written by Roger Corman, starring Richard Conte and Joan Bennett, was filmed at Apple Valley Inn.
- The Hills Have Eyes (1977), was filmed in Apple Valley and nearby Victorville.
- Ordinary People (1980), winner of four Oscars, starring Mary Tyler Moore, golf scenes were filmed in Apple Valley.
- There's Always Tomorrow (1956), starring Barbara Stanwyck and Fred MacMurray, was filmed at Apple Valley Inn.
- Two-Gun Man From Harlem (1938), was filmed at Murray's Dude Ranch.

Television

- Sky King, was filmed at the old Apple Valley Airport (old airport location coordinates: 34.528°N 117.215°W)
- Perry Mason episode, "The Case of the Roving River" (1961), was filmed at Apple Valley Inn and Newton Bass House.
- Weekend of Terror (1970 ABC Movie of the Week), starring Robert Conrad, Carol Lynley. and Lee Majors, was filmed in Apple Valley.

Commercials

- GoDaddy.com, featuring Danica Patrick

== See also ==
- Victorville Precision Bombing
- Victorville Army Airfield auxiliary fields
