= Apple Valley Unified School District =

School district in California, United States

Address
- 12555 Navajo Road Apple Valley, California, 92308; United States of America

District information
- Type: Public
- Superintendent: Trenae Nelson
- Asst. superintendent(s): Matthew Schulenberg
- NCES District ID: 0600017

Students and staff
- Students: 12,892 (2020–2021)
- Teachers: 546.53 (FTE)
- Staff: 514.88 (FTE)
- Student–teacher ratio: 23.59:1

Other information
- Website: www.avusd.org

Apple Valley Unified School District is a school district in San Bernardino County, California.

== Schools ==
The school district has 16 total active schools:

- Academy for Academic Excellence
- Apple Valley Adult Education
- Apple Valley High
- Apple Valley Unified Preschool Special Education
- Desert Knolls Elementary
- Granite Hills High
- High Desert Premier Academy
- Mariana Academy
- Phoenix Academy
- Rancho Verde Elementary
- Rio Vista School of Applied Learning
- Sandia Elementary
- Sitting Bull Academy
- Sycamore Rocks Elementary
- Vanguard Preparatory
- Yucca Loma Elementary

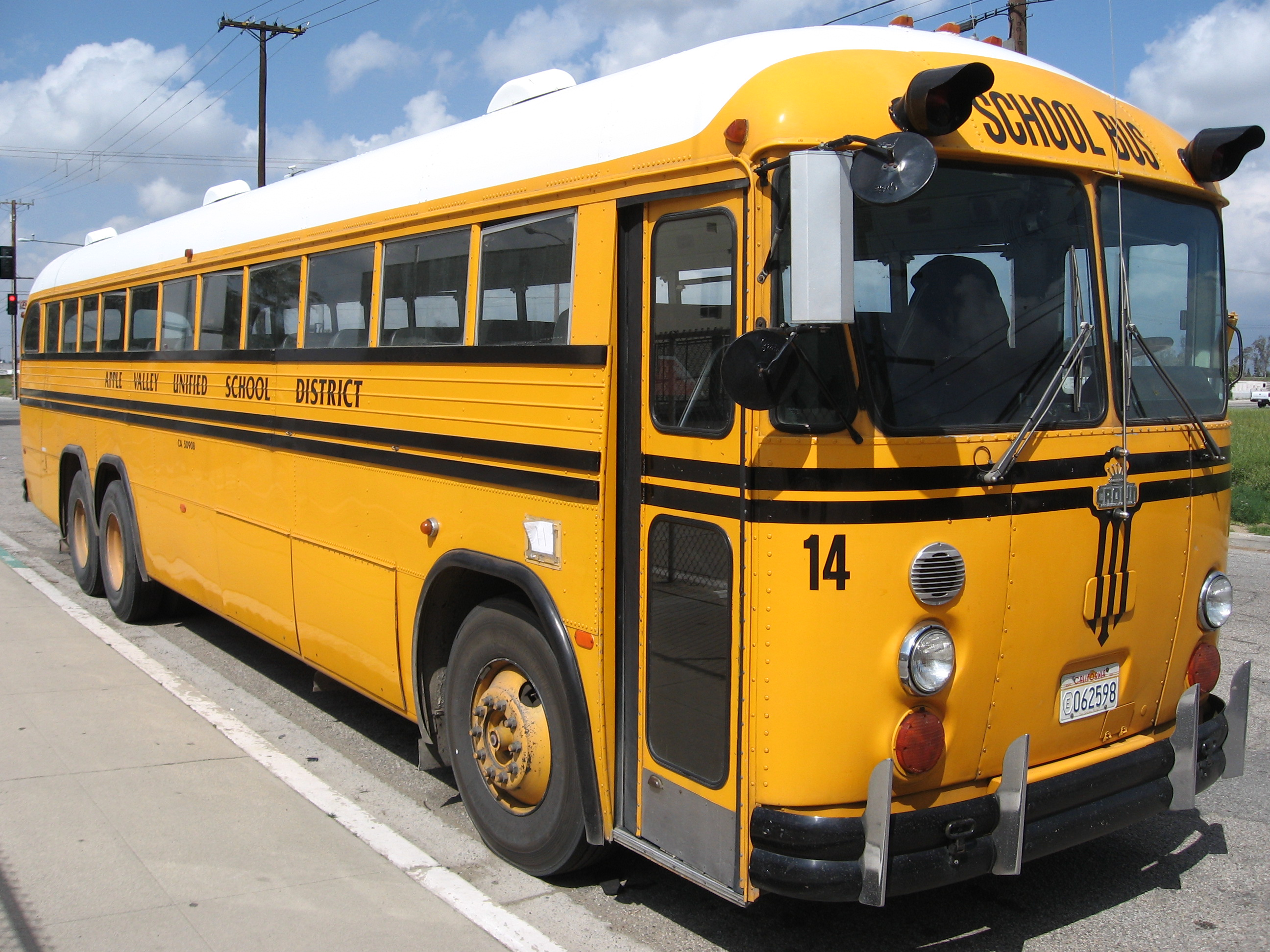
Apple Valley Unified School District Crown Coach Corporation school bus in 2008

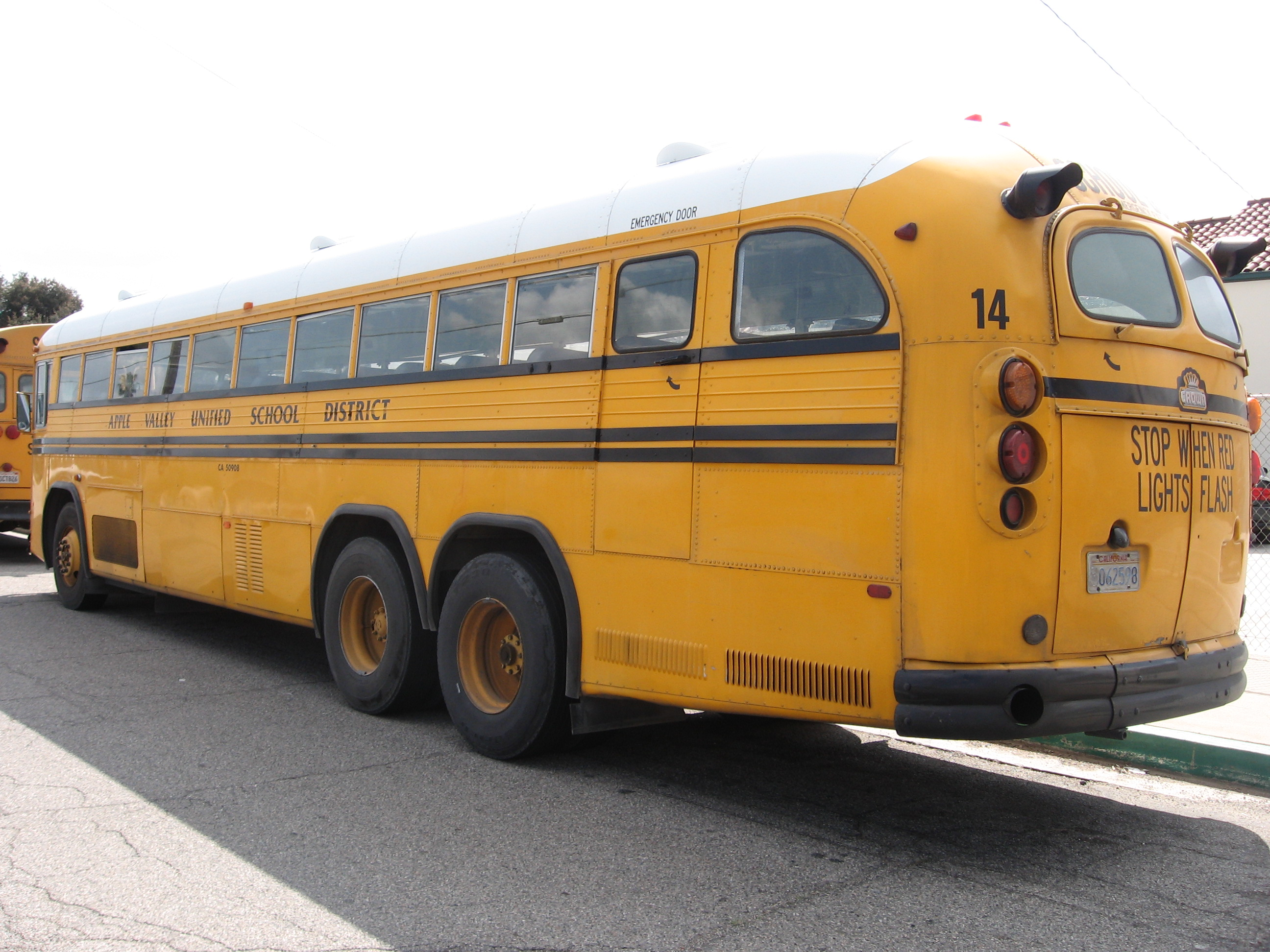

== Statistics ==
In the 2015–16 school year, the school district had a total of 852 students who could have graduated that year. Among those students, 747 graduated with a high school diploma. This makes the school district's graduation rate 87.7%.
