= Adelanto High School =

Location
- 15620 Joshua Road; Adelanto, California 92301; United States
- 34.53°N 117.44°W

Information
- Opened: August 16, 2014
- School district: Victor Valley Union High School District
- Principal: Ebony Purcell
- Staff: 93.51 (FTE)
- Enrollment: 2,229 (2023-2024)
- Student to teacher ratio: 23.84
- Colors: Maroon, gold
- Team name: Saints
- Website: Official website

Adelanto High School is a comprehensive high school of the Victor Valley Union High School District, in Adelanto, California, in the Inland Empire region.

The mascot of the athletic teams is the Saints.

== History ==
It was the first high school to be built in Adelanto; previously students attended Silverado High School and Victor Valley High School in Victorville. By 2008 area residents wanted a local high school, and the Victorville high schools were above capacity. In November of that year, the majority of the citizens in Adelanto voted in favor of building the school, by approving a $500 million bond. The name of an area youth football league, the Saints, became the high school's mascot. The State of California funded the acquisition of the land, and the bond funded the design of the campus and its construction; the latter two had a cost of $120 million.

The opening was originally scheduled for August 2012; delays revised the opening times to January 2013 and August 2013. Area residents complained that the VVUSD board was uninterested in having the school open. According to the district, it lacked money to open the campus even though the construction was just about finished in 2012. Its dedication was in April 2014, and ultimately it was to open on August 16, 2014, with an expected initial enrollment of 1,600-1,800 students. The school, which enrolled grades 9-11 in its first year, had 1,137 enrolled students at that time. Silverado High in Victorville was to be relieved upon Adelanto High's opening.

== Campus ==
The 58-acre (23 ha) campus includes a 322,000-square-foot (29,900 m^{2}), 110-classroom school building with a planned capacity of about 3,600 students. The principal architect was Mark Graham of WLC Architects. According to Brooke Self of the Victorville Daily Press, it was one of the largest campuses in the State of California.

The campus was to include a 3,500-seat stadium; the sporting field uses synthetic material, and the track uses a special rubber so it may be used all year. In addition the school has a three-court gymnasium for basketball, eight basketball courts located outdoors, a 50 metres (160 ft) Olympic-size swimming pool, classrooms for health courses, and weight, wrestling, and dance rooms, and eight tennis courts, with six locker rooms supporting the athletes and other students.

Other facilities include automotive class facilities, a career center, band rooms, choir rooms, a performing arts and black box drama center with a capacity of 525 people, a media center, five computer labs, culinary courses classrooms, and technology classrooms. The school also has a dedicated career center.

== See also ==
- Adelanto Elementary School District - Feeder school district
