= Rudy Redmond =

American football player (born 1947)

No. 47, 46
- Position: Cornerback

Personal information
- Born: August 25, 1947 (age 79); Spokane, Washington, U.S.
- Listed height: 6 ft 1 in (1.85 m)
- Listed weight: 196 lb (89 kg)

Career information
- High school: Victor Valley (Victorville, California)
- College: Pacific
- NFL draft: 1969: 4th round, 91st overall pick

Career history
- Atlanta Falcons (1969–1971); Detroit Lions (1972–1973); Green Bay Packers (1975)*
- * Offseason or practice squad member only

Awards and highlights
- Second-team All-Pac-8 (1968)

Career NFL statistics
- Interceptions: 8
- INT yards: 153
- Touchdowns: 1
- Stats at Pro Football Reference

Rudolph Cruzette Redmond (born August 25, 1947) is an American former professional football player who was a cornerback in the National Football League (NFL). He was selected 91st overall by the Chicago Bears in the fourth round of the 1969 NFL/AFL draft. He played college football for the Pacific Tigers.

Redmond also played for the Atlanta Falcons and Detroit Lions.
