= Greg Hyder =

American basketball player

Personal information
- Born: June 21, 1948 San Bernardino, California, U.S.
- Died: October 1, 2014 (aged 66) Victorville, California, U.S.
- Listed height: 6 ft 6 in (1.98 m)
- Listed weight: 215 lb (98 kg)

Career information
- High school: Victor Valley (Victorville, California)
- College: Eastern New Mexico (1966–1970)
- NBA draft: 1970: 3rd round, 39th overall pick
- Drafted by: Cincinnati Royals
- Playing career: 1970–1971
- Position: Power forward
- Number: 16

Career history
- 1970–1971: Cincinnati Royals

Career highlights
- NAIA tournament MVP (1970)
- Stats at NBA.com
- Stats at Basketball Reference

Gregory Peck Hyder (June 21, 1948 – October 1, 2014) was a former professional basketball player who played one season for the Kansas City Kings of the National Basketball Association (NBA).

== Early life ==
Gregory Peck Hyder was born on June 21, 1948, in San Bernardino, California, the son of Charles and Myrna Hyder. The family moved to Victorville, California, where Greg and his brothers grew up and attended Victor Valley High School. In high school, Greg was a three-sport star, but excelled in basketball under future SCIBCA Hall of Fame coach, Ollie Butler. Greg was a Second Team All-Southern California "AA" Basketball selection in 1966 earning him a scholarship to Eastern New Mexico University.

== College career ==
After graduating from high school, Greg attended Eastern New Mexico University from 1966 to 1970. His brother, Jerry Hyder, followed and attended Eastern New Mexico University from 1967 to 1971. Together, in 1969, they led the Greyhounds to a 23–7 record and the school's only National Association of Intercollegiate Athletics NAIA Basketball Championships. The following year, during the 1970 NAIA Tournament, Greg was the leading rebounder throughout the tournament with 65 rebounds through 5 games and was named the Chuck Taylor Most Valuable Player, despite his team finishing third. He was a four-time NAIA All American and earned first team selection for the 1970 season. When he graduation in 1970, he had set numerous school basketball records, including being the school's all-time leading scorer and rebounder.

- Most career points: 2,278 (1966–1970)
- Most points in a season: 711 (31 games) (1969–1970)
- Most field goals made in a season: 305 (1969–1970)
- Most field goals made in a career: 935 (1966–1970)
- Most field goals attempted in a season: 554 (1968–1969)
- Most field goals attempted in a career: 1765 (1966–1970)
- Most rebounds in a game: 30 vs. Fort Lewis on March 5, 1968
- Most rebounds in a season: 404 (1968–1969)
- Most rebounds in a career: 1,445
- Career rebounding average: 12.4 rebounds per game

Greg was inducted into the Eastern New Mexico University Athletic Hall of Fame in 1984.

His brother, Jerry Hyder, finished his college career at Eastern New Mexico University as the 7th leading scorer in school's history with 1,316 points and currently stands 10th all time. He was inducted into the Eastern New Mexico University Athletic Hall of Fame in 1999.

== NBA career ==
Greg was drafted in the third round of the 1970 NBA draft by the Cincinnati Royals (39th overall pick) and played one season in the NBA. His two career high games came against two of the most dominant big men in the era. Against the Milwaukee Bucks and Kareem Abdul-Jabbar on January 15, 1971, Greg scored a career high 17 points against the eventual NBA champions. On February 15, 1971, against the Wilt Chamberlain led Los Angeles Lakers, Greg scored 16 points in front of a large crowd that traveled via bus from Victorville, California, to watch the former high school star. Greg has the distinction of being the first NBA player from San Bernardino County.

His brother, Jerry, was drafted by the Denver Rockets of the ABA in 1971, but never played professional basketball.

== Career stats ==
Legend
GP	Games played	GS	Games started	MPG	Minutes per game
FG%	Field goal percentage	3P%	3-point field goal percentage	FT%	Free throw percentage
RPG	Rebounds per game	APG	Assists per game	SPG	Steals per game
BPG	Blocks per game	PPG	Points per game	**Bold**	Career high

=== College ===
Year	Games	FG%	FT%	RPG	APG	PPG
1966–67	28	51.4	69.6	10.7	N/A	14.8
1967–68	26	54.9	76.5	13.0	N/A	17.9
1968–69	31	50.0	76.2	13.0	N/A	22.2
1969–70	31	55.6	N/A	12.7	N/A	19.6

=== NBA ===
==== Regular season ====
Year	Team	GP	GS	MPG	FG%	3P%	FT%	RPG	APG	SPG	BPG	PPG
1970–71	Cincinnati	77	–	17.6	.447		.718	4.3	.6			5.4
