= Mountain View Acres, California =

Mountain View Acres
- census-designated place
- Location in San Bernardino County and the state of California

- Location in the United States
- Coordinates: 34°29′49″N 117°20′55″W
- Country: United States
- State: California
- County: San Bernardino

Area
  - Total: 1.589 sq mi (4.115 km^{2})
  - Land: 1.589 sq mi (4.115 km^{2})
  - Water: 0 sq mi (0 km^{2}) 0%
- Elevation: 3,074 ft (937 m)

Population (2020)
  - Total: 3,337
  - Density: 2,100/sq mi (810.9/km^{2})
- Time zone: UTC-8 (PST)
  - Summer (DST): UTC-7 (PDT)
- ZIP code: 92392
- Area codes: 442/760
- FIPS code: 06-49684
- GNIS feature ID: 1867043

Mountain View Acres is a census-designated place (CDP) in the Victor Valley of the Mojave Desert, within San Bernardino County, California. As of the 2020 census, Mountain View Acres had a population of 3,337.

== Geography ==
Mountain View Acres is surrounded by Victorville, and north of Hesperia

According to the United States Census Bureau, the CDP has a total area of 1.6 square miles (4.1 km^{2}), all land.

== Demographics ==
Historical population
Census	Pop.	Note	%±
1980	1,686		—
1990	2,469		46.4%
2000	2,521		2.1%
2010	3,130		24.2%
2020	3,337		6.6%
U.S. Decennial Census; 1850–1870 1880-1890; 1900 1910 1920; 1930 1940 1950; 1960 1970 1980; 1990 2000 2010

Mountain View Acres was first listed as a census designated place in the 1980 U.S. census.

=== 2020 census ===
As of the 2020 census, Mountain View Acres had a population of 3,337 and a population density of 2,100.1 inhabitants per square mile (810.9/km^{2}). The median age was 37.1 years; 25.1% of residents were under the age of 18 and 15.2% were 65 years of age or older. For every 100 females, there were 99.6 males, and for every 100 females age 18 and over, there were 101.9 males age 18 and over. 99.8% of residents lived in urban areas, while 0.2% lived in rural areas.

The whole population lived in households. There were 954 households, out of which 40.3% included children under the age of 18, 53.0% were married-couple households, 7.1% were cohabiting couple households, 21.1% had a female householder with no spouse or partner present, and 18.8% had a male householder with no spouse or partner present. 15.7% of households were one person, and 6.6% were one person aged 65 or older. The average household size was 3.5. There were 758 families (79.5% of all households).

There were 995 housing units at an average density of 626.2 units per square mile (241.8 units/km^{2}), of which 954 (95.9%) were occupied. Of these, 72.7% were owner-occupied, and 27.3% were occupied by renters. 4.1% of housing units were vacant. The homeowner vacancy rate was 0.7% and the rental vacancy rate was 2.9%.

Racial composition as of the 2020 census
Race	Number	Percent
White	1,136	34.0%
Black or African American	218	6.5%
American Indian and Alaska Native	85	2.5%
Asian	97	2.9%
Native Hawaiian and Other Pacific Islander	11	0.3%
Some other race	1,148	34.4%
Two or more races	642	19.2%
Hispanic or Latino (of any race)	2,106	63.1%

=== Income and poverty ===
In 2023, the US Census Bureau estimated that the median household income was $70,179, and the per capita income was $19,937. About 25.7% of families and 30.2% of the population were below the poverty line.

=== 2010 census ===
At the 2010 census Mountain View Acres had a population of 3,130. The population density was 1,992.3 inhabitants per square mile (769.2/km^{2}). The racial makeup of Mountain View Acres was 1,748 (55.8%) White (34.6% Non-Hispanic White), 215 (6.9%) African American, 48 (1.5%) Native American, 98 (3.1%) Asian, 17 (0.5%) Pacific Islander, 861 (27.5%) from other races, and 143 (4.6%) from two or more races. Hispanic or Latino of any race were 1,647 persons (52.6%).

The census reported that 3,102 people (99.1% of the population) lived in households, 28 (0.9%) lived in non-institutionalized group quarters, and no one was institutionalized.

There were 906 households, 400 (44.2%) had children under the age of 18 living in them, 534 (58.9%) were opposite-sex married couples living together, 147 (16.2%) had a female householder with no husband present, 88 (9.7%) had a male householder with no wife present. There were 56 (6.2%) unmarried opposite-sex partnerships, and 1 (0.1%) same-sex married couples or partnerships. 108 households (11.9%) were one person and 50 (5.5%) had someone living alone who was 65 or older. The average household size was 3.42. There were 769 families (84.9% of households); the average family size was 3.60.

The age distribution was 886 people (28.3%) under the age of 18, 353 people (11.3%) aged 18 to 24, 746 people (23.8%) aged 25 to 44, 790 people (25.2%) aged 45 to 64, and 355 people (11.3%) who were 65 or older. The median age was 34.3 years. For every 100 females, there were 102.9 males. For every 100 females age 18 and over, there were 101.3 males.

There were 989 housing units at an average density of 629.5 per square mile, of the occupied units 660 (72.8%) were owner-occupied and 246 (27.2%) were rented. The homeowner vacancy rate was 3.3%; the rental vacancy rate was 4.7%. 2,155 people (68.8% of the population) lived in owner-occupied housing units and 947 people (30.3%) lived in rental housing units.

According to the 2010 United States Census, Mountain View Acres had a median household income of $56,318, with 20.5% of the population living below the federal poverty line.

== Government ==
In the California State Legislature, Mountain View Acres is in the 23rd senatorial district, represented by Republican Suzette Martinez Valladares, and in the 39th Assembly district, represented by Democrat Juan Carrillo.

In the United States House of Representatives, Mountain View Acres is in California's 23rd congressional district, represented by Republican Jay Obernolte.

== Education ==
It is in Victor Elementary School District and Victor Valley Union High School District
