= Silverado High School (Victorville, California) =

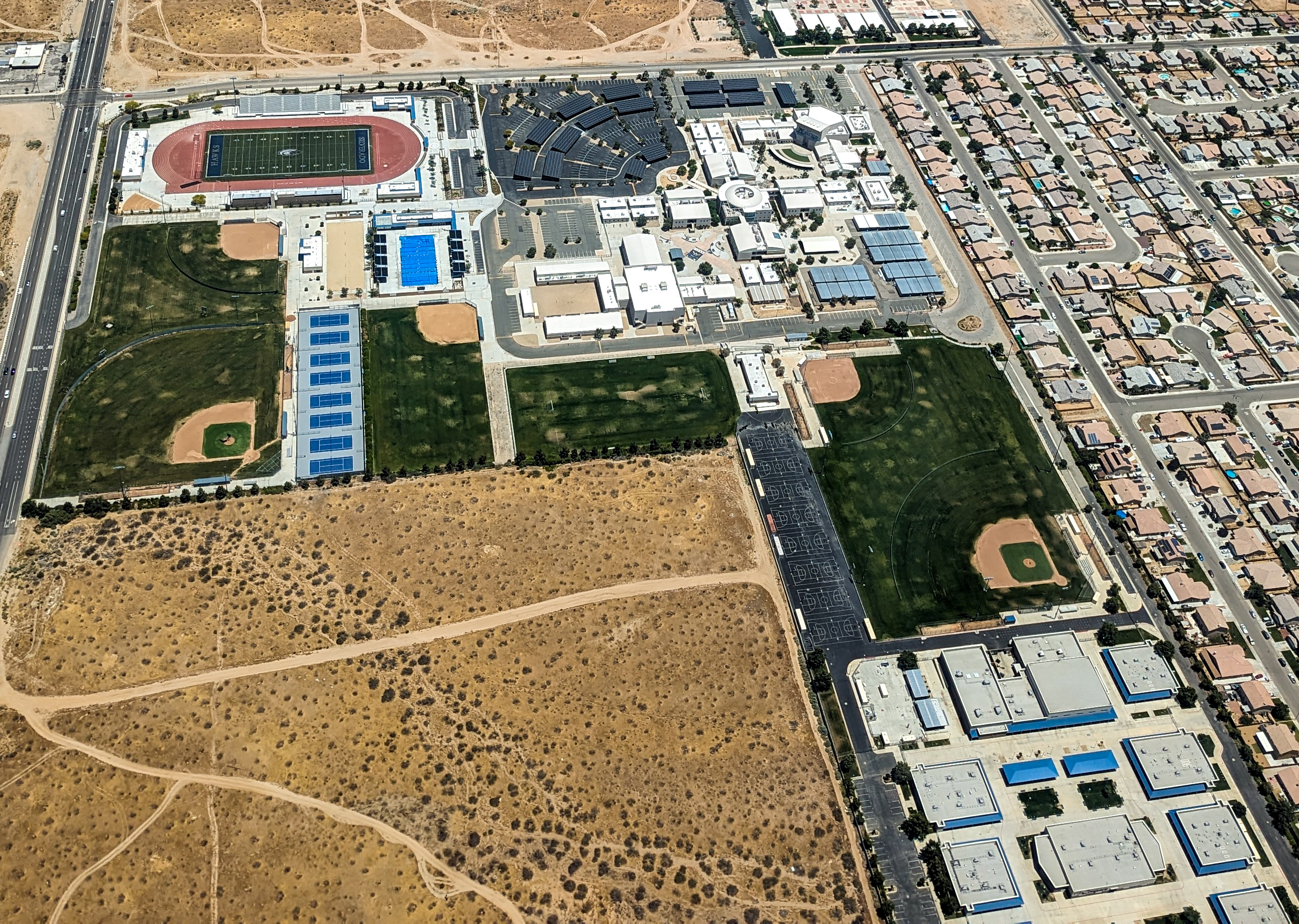
- Aerial view of Silverado High School

Location
- 14048 Cobalt Road; Victorville, California 92392; United States; 34°30′09″N 117°22′30″W

Information
- School type: Public
- School district: Victor Valley Union High School District
- Principal: Heather Conkle
- Teaching staff: 97.36 (FTE)
- Grades: 9-12
- Enrollment: 2,171 (2023-2024)
- Student to teacher ratio: 22.30
- Colors: Navy Blue & Silver
- Athletics conference: Desert Sky League
- Nickname: Hawks
- Newspaper: Hawk Talk
- Yearbook: The Talon
- Website: School website

Silverado High School is a high school in Victorville, California, United States. It is part of the Victor Valley Union High School District. Construction began on Silverado High School in 1996, its first class graduated in 1999. Silverado's primary rival is the cross-town Victor Valley High School Jackrabbits.

== History ==
Silverado High was to be relieved of students upon the opening of Adelanto High School in Adelanto in 2014.

Silverado High School celebrated its silver anniversary in the fall of 2021, commemorating the successful graduation of close to 13,000 students.

== Campus ==
The original campus consists of three separate lunch areas, commonly known as the Freshman area, Sophomore area, and Junior and Senior area. It all consists of 1000-9000 building arrangements. All three lunch areas have a lunch distribution building for receiving breakfast and lunch. The gym, or 7000 building, also contains the weight room and the Multi-Purpose Room (MPR). A building called the Performing Arts Center (PAC), located in the 6000 building, is primarily used for assemblies, plays, concerts, and informative programs. Currently there is construction taking place on the campus, which, when completed, is rumored result in a teacher restaurant and a state-of-the-art facility for unknown purposes. There also has been a recent addition the Silverado campus known as the Early College high school. Here one can find a college-like environment where students can take classes with both high school and college credits (not to be mistaken with concurrent enrollment classes, in which one is enrolled in a college as a high school student).

== Extracurricular activities ==
Silverado High School's Cheerleaders hold many national titles. In 2004 Silverado's Varsity Cheer team won first place at the United Spirit Association (USA) West Coast Spirit Nationals in the Small Varsity Show Cheer Novice division. In 2005 the team took 1st place in the Medium Varsity Show Cheer Novice division. In 2007 Silverado took 1st place in Medium Show Cheer Intermediate division at USA Nationals.

=== Athletics ===
The Silverado Hawks compete in the Desert Sky League of the CIF Southern Section.

== Notable alumni ==
- Stevie Ryan - actress
- Joe Stevenson - mixed martial artist, formerly fighting in the Ultimate Fighting Championship
