= Sunset Ridge, Victorville, California =

Coordinates: 34°27′14″N 117°23′11″W

Sunset Ridge is a neighborhood in Victorville, in the Victor Valley region of the Mojave Desert, within San Bernardino County, California.

== Geography ==
The neighborhood is located in southern Victorville, between Interstate 15 and U.S. Route 395, and is northwest of Hesperia.

The community's elevation varies from 3,500–4,000 feet (1,100–1,200 m) above sea level.

The average temperature in summer is about 90°F degrees, and in winter is about 40°F degrees. The average snowfall is at least six inches.

== See also ==
- Victorville topics
- Victor Valley topics
