= Adelanto Elementary School District =

School district in California, United States

- 11824 Air Expressway Adelanto, California, 92301

District information
- Type: Public
- Grades: K–12
- NCES District ID: 0601710

Students and staff
- Students: 7,817
- Teachers: 365.99
- Staff: 411.13
- Student–teacher ratio: 21.36

Other information
- Website: www.aesd.net

Adelanto Elementary School District (AESD) is an elementary and middle school-only school district in San Bernardino County, California. It is headquartered in Adelanto.

It serves Adelanto and portions of Victorville.

Students at the high school level attend Victor Valley Union High School District, with 9–12 students attending Adelanto High School campus on Mojave Road operated by VVUHSD starting in the 2014–2015 School Year.

== Schools ==
K–8 schools:

- El Mirage School (Opened in 2012)
- George Visual & Performing Arts Magnet School (Opened in 2004)

Middle schools:

- Columbia Middle School (Opened in 2004)
- Melva Davis Academy of Excellence STEAM Middle School (Opened in 2016)
- Mesa Linda Middle School (Opened in 1999)

Elementary schools:

- Adelanto Elementary School (Opened in 1954)
- Donald F. Bradach Elementary School (Opened in 1998)
- Eagle Ranch Elementary School (Opened in 1990)
- Gus Franklin, Jr. STEM School (Opened in 2014)
- Morgan Kincaid Preparatory School of Integrated Studies (Opened in 2004)
- Theodore Vick School (Opened in 2004)
- Victoria Magathan Elementary School (Opened in 2005)
- West Creek Elementary School (Opened in 2006)
- Westside Park Elementary School (Unknown)

Credit Recovery/BRIDGES Program

- Adelanto Virtual Academy

(Opened in 2017)

== Former schools ==
Desert Trails Elementary School was previously in the district. Prior to its 2013 closure it had the lowest test scores in AESD. In addition almost 75% of the 6th students in Desert Trails performed below grade level in mathematics. Due to a Parent Trigger Initiative under the laws of the State of California, Desert Trails Elementary was officially closed and replaced by Desert Trails Preparatory Academy, a charter school. In December 2015 AESD voted not to renew the charter of Desert Trails Preparatory. In March 2016 the San Bernardino County Board of Education voted to hand authority over the charter school to the county government in a 3–2 vote, removing it from the district.

Additional closed campuses include George Elementary School and Sheppard Middle School, both on the grounds of the Southern California Logistics Airport. George Visual and Performing Arts Magnet School on Bartlett Road replaces both campuses as a K–8 site, where the Sheppard Middle School site is utilized by Excelsior Charter Schools for their AME Campus. The former George Elementary School site has reopened in 2017 as a mixed-use facility, starting as the AESD Professional Development Center for PD-Professional Learning Community instruction, as well as the Adelanto Virtual Academy which began operation in 2018–19.
