= Victor Elementary School District =

School district in Victorville, California, United States

Address
- 12219 2nd Avenue Victorville, California, 92395; United States

District information
- Type: Public
- Grades: K–6
- NCES District ID: 0641040

Students and staff
- Students: 12,358
- Teachers: 503.0
- Staff: 503.14
- Student–teacher ratio: 24.57

Other information
- Website: www.vesd.net

Victor Elementary School District (VESD) is a school district headquartered in Victorville, California.

It includes sections of Victorville, as well as the census-designated places of Mountain View Acres and Spring Valley Lake. It feeds into the Victor Valley Union High School District.

== Schools ==
- Brentwood (Victorville)
- Challenger (Victorville)
- Del Rey (Victorville)
- Dr. Ralph H. Baker (Victorville)
- Discovery (Victorville)
- Endeavour (Victorville)
- Galileo (Victorville)
- Green Tree East (Victorville)
- Irwin Academy (Victorville)
- Liberty (Victorville)
- Lomitas (Victorville)
- Mojave Vista (Victorville)
- Mountain View Montessori (Victorville)
- Park View Preparatory (Victorville)
- Puesta Del Sol (Victorville)
- Sixth Street Prep (Victorville)
- Village Elementary (Victorville)
- West Palms Conservatory (Victorville)
