= Stevie Ryan =

American YouTube personality and actress (1984–2017)

- Born: Stevie Kathleen Ryan; June 2, 1984; Riverside, California, U.S.
- Died: July 1, 2017 (aged 33); Los Angeles, California, U.S.
- Occupations: Actress; comedian
- Years active: 2004–2017

Stevie Kathleen Ryan (June 2, 1984 – July 1, 2017) was an American YouTube personality, actress and comedian. She was known for her YouTube videos and starring in the VH1 series Stevie TV.

Ryan was born June 2, 1984, in Riverside, California. At the age of two, Ryan and her family relocated to Victorville, where her parents operated a trucking business. In 2002, she graduated from Silverado High School.

At the age of 19, Ryan made the move to Los Angeles to pursue a career in the entertainment industry. Throughout 2006 and 2007, Ryan booked various commercial projects while also filming, editing, and acting in videos which she posted online.

Ryan collaborated with New Wave Entertainment in 2010 on the sketch comedy show Stevie TV, which parodied famous pop culture personalities and phenomena. It was picked up by VH1. It was cancelled after the second season.

== Death and lawsuit ==
Ryan was found dead in her home due to an apparent suicide by hanging on July 1, 2017, at the age of 33.

In 2018, it was reported that the late actress's parents brought a lawsuit against nurse practitioner Gerald Baltz after it was learned that Baltz, who for two years had provided Ryan with psychiatric care, had an inappropriate sexual relationship with Ryan months before her death. Baltz allegedly issued Ryan prescriptions for about 10 drugs used to treat a range of conditions — including depression, schizophrenia and bipolar disorder — without providing "clear rationale for prescribed medications," according to the accusation. He also allegedly failed to seek supervision for her when she was suicidal. In 2019, Ryan's parents, Baltz, and Baltz's company Baltz Psychiatry Nursing, settled in the L.A. County Superior Court case for $200,000, according to a settlement notice filed with the court. On March 3, 2022, it was reported that Baltz was stripped of his California medical license.

== Filmography ==
=== Film ===
Year	Title	Role	Notes
2006	Rhapsody	Michelle	Short
2006	Sell Out	Beauty Parlor Girl	Short
2015	John Doe; Diary of a Serial Killer	Herself	

=== Television ===
Year	Title	Role	Notes
2008	The Heavy Show	Amy Winehouse	2 episodes
2009	Sex Ed: The Series	Eileen	Web series
2012–13	Stevie TV	Herself	Host; 14 episodes
2014	Ridiculousness	Herself	Season 4, Episode 5
