= Victor Valley High School =

Location
- 16500 Mojave Drive; Victorville, California; United States; 34°31′49″N 117°18′08″W

Information
- Established: September 25, 1915
- School district: Victor Valley Union High School District
- Teaching staff: 87.69 (FTE)
- Grades: 9-12
- Enrollment: 2,169 (2023-2024)
- Student to teacher ratio: 24.73
- Colors: Kelly green and white
- Athletics conference: Desert Sky League
- Team name: Jackrabbits
- Rival: Apple Valley
- Website: vvhs.vvuhsd.org

Victor Valley High School is located in Victorville, California, United States. It is the oldest high school in the Victor Valley Union High School District (VVUHSD).

The original campus was located at the former Victor Valley Junior High and University Preparatory School on Forrest Avenue in Old Town Victorville, until the current campus was built in 1952. It was the first of two high schools in Victorville, with the second being Silverado High School, completed in 1996.

Visible from the homeside of Ray Moore Stadium is the Victorville "V," which was placed on a hill as a landmark for the original location of the High School on Forrest Ave. Keith Gunn, then high school football coach and later principal, spearheaded the project in the 1930s, with the cement being donated by Southwestern Portland Cement Company. The Keith Gunn Gymnasium is named in his honor, while the floor is dedicated to basketball coach Ollie Butler.

The grassy area in the middle courtyard of the school is the "Senior Lawn", where only seniors are allowed. The courtyard is painted every year by the seniors to reflect their class.

== Athletics ==
Victor Valley High School fields several teams in the Desert Sky League, including football, basketball, baseball, softball, wrestling, soccer (men's and women's), volleyball, swimming, tennis, track & field, cross country, and golf. Fencing is a competitive team, but not a member of the California Interscholastic Federation (CIF).

Several league championships have been won over the years in the Golden League, San Andreas League, and the Desert Sky League. In 1987, the wrestling team was the California State Champions. The school has won ten California Interscholastic Federation Southern Section (CIF-SS) Championships. The first in 1981 was won by the women's C\cross country team in the CIF-SS 2A Division, the next eight were won by the wrestling team, and recently the Boys Basketball Team won the 8A title in 2026. Though not a sanctioned CIF sport, the fencing team has won the California High School Championships numerous times, including six straight wins from 2006-2012.

In 1987 the football team played in the CIF-SS Finals, the basketball team played in the CIF-SS Semi-Finals, the track and field team took third in the CIF-SS 2A Division and had the Champion in the 110 high meter and 300 meter intermediate hurdles, the tennis team won the San Andreas league title, and the wrestling team won the CIF State Title.

=== Baseball ===
Since 1988, twelve former Jackrabbits were drafted in the MLB Amateur Entry Draft.

=== Basketball ===
Under Hall of Fame Coach Ollie Butler, the basketball program won 13 league titles and 605 games. From 1974 to 1983, the Jackrabbits won ten consecutive league titles between the Golden League and San Andreas League. At the time, it was the third longest streak in CIF-SS history and currently ranks ninth. In 1977 and 1978, the Jackrabbits made back-to-back appearances in the CIF-SS 2-A Basketball Championships, losing both times to Channel Islands High School. In 1987, the Jackrabbits played in the CIF-SS 2-A Basketball Semi-Finals, where they lost to eventual winner Woodbridge High School. The 2026, boys basketball team won the CIF 8A Championship.

Three players were drafted to professional basketball. The first was Greg Hyder, the all-time leading scorer for Eastern New Mexico University and a third-round selection by the Cincinnati Royals of the NBA in the 1970 NBA draft. Greg would play one year in the NBA. Greg's younger brother, Jerry, who played alongside Greg at Eastern New Mexico University where they won the 1969 NAIA Basketball Championships, was selected in the 14th round by the Denver Rockets in the 1971 ABA Draft. The 1977 CIF-SS 2A Player of the Year, Tony Anderson, was selected in the seventh round by the New Jersey Nets in the 1982 NBA draft, after playing for UCLA. Neither Jerry Hyder nor Tony Anderson played professional basketball in the United States. The school's all-time leading scorer also played under Butler, Clyde "Scooty" Rivers (1978–1982), who went to play at the University of Utah.

Coach Butler was elected into the SCIBA Hall of Fame in 1999 and the floor in the Keith Gunn Gymnasium is named in his honor.

The Jackrabbits played in their third CIF-SS Basketball Championship in the 1-AA large school division losing to Long Beach Jordan High School, 54-38, in 1996. The 2026 Jackrabbits won the school's first CIF basketball championship defeating South El Monte High School, 78-47 in the CIF-SS Division 8 finals.

=== Football ===
The Jackrabbits compete annually against Apple Valley High School in the "Bell Game" and against Barstow High School in the "Axe Game". The Bell game has been played since 1969. Apple Valley leads the overall series 39-17. The "Axe" game has been played since 1932 and is the longest high school rivalry game in the High Desert of Southern California. Barstow High School leads the series 51-45-4.

The Jackrabbits have played in two CIF-SS Championships. The first was in 1966 against Lawndale High School, which they lost 19-7. The second was in 1987 against Arroyo High School, where the Jackrabbits lost 7-3 in overtime.

Two players from the school are tied for the CIF-SS longest run from scrimmage of 99 yards. The first was run in 1998 by Carl Brown and the second in 2002 by Curtis Rudd, Jr.

=== Tennis ===
From 1952 to 1990, the Jackrabbits won multiple Golden and San Andreas League Team and individual Championships in both men's and women's tennis.

=== Track and field ===
The Jackrabbits have had eight CIF-SS Individual Champions in the following events: men's 100 meters, men's 110 meters high hurdles, men's 300 meter intermediate hurdles (twice), men's long jump (twice), women's 400 meters, and women's triple jump.

=== Wrestling ===
From 1983 to 1991, the team had 13 Individual 3A CIF-SS Champions in various weight classes and three California State Champions.

In 1983, the Jackrabbits placed third in the CIF-SS Championships. In 1986, they placed second, and in 1987, placed third. Despite finishing third that year, the Jackrabbits won the school's only California State Title, anchored by two-time Olympian and Pride World Champion, Dan Henderson. In 1990, the wrestling team won the CIF-SS 3-A Championship and finished fourth in the State Championships.

Long-time head coach Sam Gollmyer retired and was inducted into the California Wrestling Hall of Fame.

The team won the CIF-SS Coastal Division Championship and CIF-SS Division 4 Team Dual-Meet Championship in 2012. In all, the Jackrabbits have won eight various CIF-SS titles. For individual titles, the Jackrabbits have 15 wrestlers with a CIF-SS title, eight with a CIF Masters title, and three with a CIF State title.

Championships	Year
CIF State Championship	1987
CIF-SS 3-A Championship	1990
CIF-SS Coastal Division Championship	2012
CIF-SS Division 4 Team Dual-Meet Championship	2012
CIF-SS Division 3 Team Dual-Meet Championship	2013
CIF-SS Eastern Division Team Dual-Meet Championship	2016
CIF-SS Coastal Division Championship	2016
CIF-SS Southern Division Championship	2017
CIF-SS Division 2 Team Dual-Meet Championship	2019

== Notable alumni ==
- Geoffrey Lewis (actor) (1953): actor, father of Juliette Lewis.
- Rudy Redmond (1965): NFL player from 1969-1972 with the Atlanta Falcons and Detroit Lions
- Greg Hyder (1966): NBA player from 1970-1971 Sacramento Kings
- John W. Henry (1967): businessman, owner of Boston Red Sox and Liverpool Football Club
- Tony Cherry (1981): NFL player from 1986-1987, San Francisco 49ers; CFL player from 1988-1991
- Dan Henderson (1988): professional mixed martial artist; two-time Olympic Greco-Roman Wrestler (1992 and 1996)
