= Sex Ed: The Series =

2009–2010 American comedy web series

- Official poster and logo
- Genre: Comedy
- Created by: Ernie Vecchione
- Written by: Ernie Vecchione
- Directed by: Tamela D'Amico
- Starring: Matt Barr; Angela Sarafyan; George Finn; Laura Clery; Andrea Lui; Annie Abrams; Andra Fuller; Casey Graf; Bo Barrett; Tamela D'Amico; Jennifer Johnson; Louis Morabito; Stevie Ryan
- Composer: Kyle Newmaster

Production
- Producers: Ernie Vecchione; Tamela D'Amico
- Cinematography: Christina Fiers
- Editor: Skip Collector
- Production companies: La Strega Entertainment; Ernie Vecchione Screenwriter

Original release
- Network: KoldCast TV
- Release: November 10, 2009 – January 11, 2010

Sex Ed the Series is an American comedy web series created, written and produced by Ernie Vecchione and co-produced and directed by Tamela D'Amico.

The show revolves around the lives of eight students and their manic professor, Alison Trevase (Joanna Cassidy). The show is described as a cross between The Breakfast Club and Sex and the City. The show stars Matt Barr, Angela Sarafyan, George Finn, Laura Clery, Andrea Lui, Annie Abrams, Andra Fuller, Casey Graf, Bo Barrett, Tamela D'Amico, Jennifer Johnson, Louis Morabito and Stevie Ryan.

== Plot summary ==
Eight college students get more than they bargained for when their professor forces the students to pair up and make clay sculptures of each other's genitals.

== History ==
The pilot was a selection of the 2009 Independent Television Festival. The show was first broadcast as a web series by KoldCastTV in 2010.

== Nominations ==
The show received a Streamy nomination for Best Actress in a Comedy for Joanna Cassidy and a Webby nomination for Best Drama.

In the May 3, 2010 issue of TV Guide magazine, the series was selected as What's Worth Watching by Damian Holbrook.

== Episodes ==
No.	Title	Directed by	Written by	Original release date
1	"Tuesday: First Day of Class"	Tamela D'Amico	Ernie Vecchione	November 10, 2009
2	"This Is Sex Ed"	Tamela D'Amico	Ernie Vecchione	November 17, 2009
3	"Sculpting Each Other's Genitals"	Tamela D'Amico	Ernie Vecchione	November 24, 2009
4	"Wednesday: Pairing Up"	Tamela D'Amico	Ernie Vecchione	December 1, 2009
5	"How Are We Gonna Do This?"	Tamela D'Amico	Ernie Vecchione	December 8, 2009
6	"How’s Your Cock?"	Tamela D'Amico	Ernie Vecchione	December 15, 2009
7	"The Twat Nazi"	Tamela D'Amico	Ernie Vecchione	December 22, 2009
8	"Thursday: Show and Tell"	Tamela D'Amico	Ernie Vecchione	December 28, 2009
9	"Trevase’s Office - Cigarette?"	Tamela D'Amico	Ernie Vecchione	January 4, 2010
10	"The Body Electric"	Tamela D'Amico	Ernie Vecchione	January 11, 2010

== Website and YouTube ==
Its YouTube channel, as of November 2019, surpassed nearly 150 million channel views worldwide, with over 54 million views for its half-hour premiere episode. The official web site was relaunched on Aug 1, 2012 with twenty minutes of additional material.
