= Jacob Nash Victor =

American civil engineer (1835-1907)

- Born: April 2, 1835; Sandusky County, Ohio, US
- Died: October 3, 1907 (aged 72); San Bernardino, California, US
- Known for: construction of California Southern Railroad

Jacob Nash Victor (April 2, 1835 in Sandusky County, Ohio – October 3, 1907 in San Bernardino, California), son of Henry Clay Victor and Gertrude Nash, was a civil engineer who worked as General Manager of the California Southern Railroad, a subsidiary of Atchison, Topeka and Santa Fe Railway. Victor oversaw the construction in the early 1880s of the California Southern between Colton and Barstow, California, including the section that is now one of the busiest rail freight routes in the United States, Cajon Pass.

The city of Victorville, California, is named in his honor.
