= Tamela D'Amico =

American jazz singer

Tamela D'Amico is an American singer, actress, and filmmaker who started the production company La Strega Entertainment in 2006 and BELLONA Entertainment in 2020.

== Career ==
D'Amico was one of 24 finalists on the FOX television reality show On the Lot produced by Steven Spielberg and Mark Burnett. She received attention from the show's producers with her entry film entitled Volare starring Federico Castelluccio.

D'Amico attended film school at Florida State University and studied at the Lee Strasberg Theatre and Film Institute in Los Angeles. She produced and directed the internet program Sex Ed: The Series. She has created internet programs for Atom Films, Funny or Die, Frog Island, Comedy ETC and Comedy Central. Her debut jazz album, Got a Little Story, was executive produced by actor Peter Krause and Jimmy Hoyson and arranged by Chris Walden. She executive produced the album Big Band Jazz for Billy Vera and sang a duet with him on one song on the album. She acted the part of Janet Smythe on the program Best Friends Whenever and appeared in the film Walt Before Mickey. She has also appeared in the Amazon series Englishman in L.A. She has modeled for Alison Raffaele Cosmetic and Mellow World Handbags. She was named Outstanding Actress in a Comedy Web Series at the Los Angeles Web Series Festival. Sex Ed: The Series was nominated for a Streamy Award and a Webby Award.

== Discography ==
- Like One (2004)
- I Can't Sleep (2005)
- The Tamela D'Amico Album (2007)
- Got a Little Story (2009)
- Down With Love (2010)
- Love and the Gun (feat. Tamela D'Amico) (2014)
- I'll Never Be Free (feat. Tamela D'Amico) (2015)
- Winter Wonderland (2016)
- Christmas Lights (2016)

== Film ==
Year	Film	Role(s)	Director, Company, Notes
2019	One Little Finger	Raina	Rupam Sarmah
Filming	Love is Not Love	Vita	Stephen Keep Mills
Filming	Quinn	Lola	Andrew Cinclair
2017	Englishman in LA: The Movie	Cassidy Clack	David Vendette, Devolver Digital Films
2017	Harlem to Hollywood	Herself	Alan Swyer
2016	3 People I've Never Heard Of	Adrianna	David Rosfeld
2016	TRUMP: (Ya Got) Trouble	Producer, Director	Tamela D'Amico, Richard Kraft, La Strega Entertainment
2015	The Modern Fundamentalist: Kim Davis Parody	Producer, Director	Tamela D'Amico, Richard Kraft
2015	Walt Before Mickey	Mrs. Doyle	Khoa Le, Netflix
2015	Jupiter Ascending	Plinth	Lana Wachowski, Lilly Wachowski, Warner Bros.
2014	Rob the Mob	Performer	Raymond De Felitta, Soundtrack, Performer ("Love and the Gun")
2012	What Might Have Been	Producer, Director	missing dance sequence from Bladerunner
2011	Black Swan, Grey Goose	Actress	Cooper Barnes
2010	Pizza With Bullets	Performer	Robert Rothbard, Performer ("I COULD BE GOOD 4 U")
2010	On a Dark and Stormy Night	Leah, Performer	Ezequiel, Performer ("Don't Die")
2010	Mitchum's Hardest Working Person in America: 86 Year Old Piano Tuner	Producer, Director	Tamela D'Amico, Brian Herzlinger
2008	West of Brooklyn	Cousin Nikki, Performer	Danny Cistone, Performer ("Amazing Grace")
2007	Game Over	Producer, Writer, Director	Tamela D'Amico, Fox Network
2005	The Black Magic	The Singer, Performer	Aloura Charles, Performer ("Mon Coeur Est Un Violon")
2004	Volare	Tomato, Director, Producer, Performer ("Sing, Writer	Tamela D'Amico, Performer ("Sing, Sing, Sing"),
2001	Mafioso, The Father, the Son	Gina	Anthony Caldarella, Allumination Filmworks

== Television ==
Year	Film	Role(s)	Notes
2016–	Comedy ETC	Various Characters, Producer, Director	53 episodes, through production company La Strega Entertainment
2015–2016	Best Friends Whenever	Young Janet Smythe	5 episodes, The Disney Channel
2014–2016	Englishman in L.A.	Cassidy Clark	4 episodes
2012	Sex Ed: The Series	Actress, Director, Producer	6 episodes, through production company La Strega Entertainment
2012	Sherman's In Sanity	Claudia, Associate Producer	2 episodes
2011–2012	Pacino & Pacino Talent Agency	Producer, Director	6 episodes, Comedy Central
2008	Passions	Actress	Episode dated 7 August 2008
2007	The Timer Game	Producer	22 episodes
2007	On the Lot	Herself	4 episodes, Fox
2002	The Jamie Kennedy Experiment	Herself	Episode: #2.9 (Dec 5, 2002)
2001	Crossing Over with John Edward	Herself	Episode dated 1 February 2001
1998	Sabrina, The Teenage Witch	Teen Dancer	Episode: "It's a Mad Mad Mad Mad Season Opener" (Season 3, Episode 1)

== Music Videos ==
Year	Video Title	Role(s)	Artist
2014	Room With A View	Producer	Billy Vera
2014	Love and the Gun	Performer	Tamela D'Amico
2013	One For My Baby	Performer	Tamela D'Amico
2013	Perfect	Performer	Tamela D'Amico
2011	Bye, Bye, Blackbird	Producer, Director, Cinematographer	Nancy Harms
