= Victor Valley Union High School District =

School district in California, United States

Address
- 16350 Mojave Drive Victorville, California, 92395; United States

District information
- Type: Public
- Grades: 7–12
- NCES District ID: 0636972

Students and staff
- Students: 10,641
- Teachers: 432.81
- Staff: 438.31
- Student–teacher ratio: 24.59

Other information
- Website: www.vvuhsd.org

Victor Valley Union High School District (VVUHSD) is a school district in the Victor Valley of San Bernardino County, southern California.

It serves grades 7-12 in the Victor Valley region of the Mojave Desert, including much of Victorville and all of Adelanto. It also includes the census-designated places of Mountain View Acres, Silver Lakes (a.k.a. Helendale), and Spring Valley Lake.

It operates nine schools. As of 2024 it has about 10,641 students and over 900 faculty members.

The Victor Valley Union High School District headquarters are in Victorville.

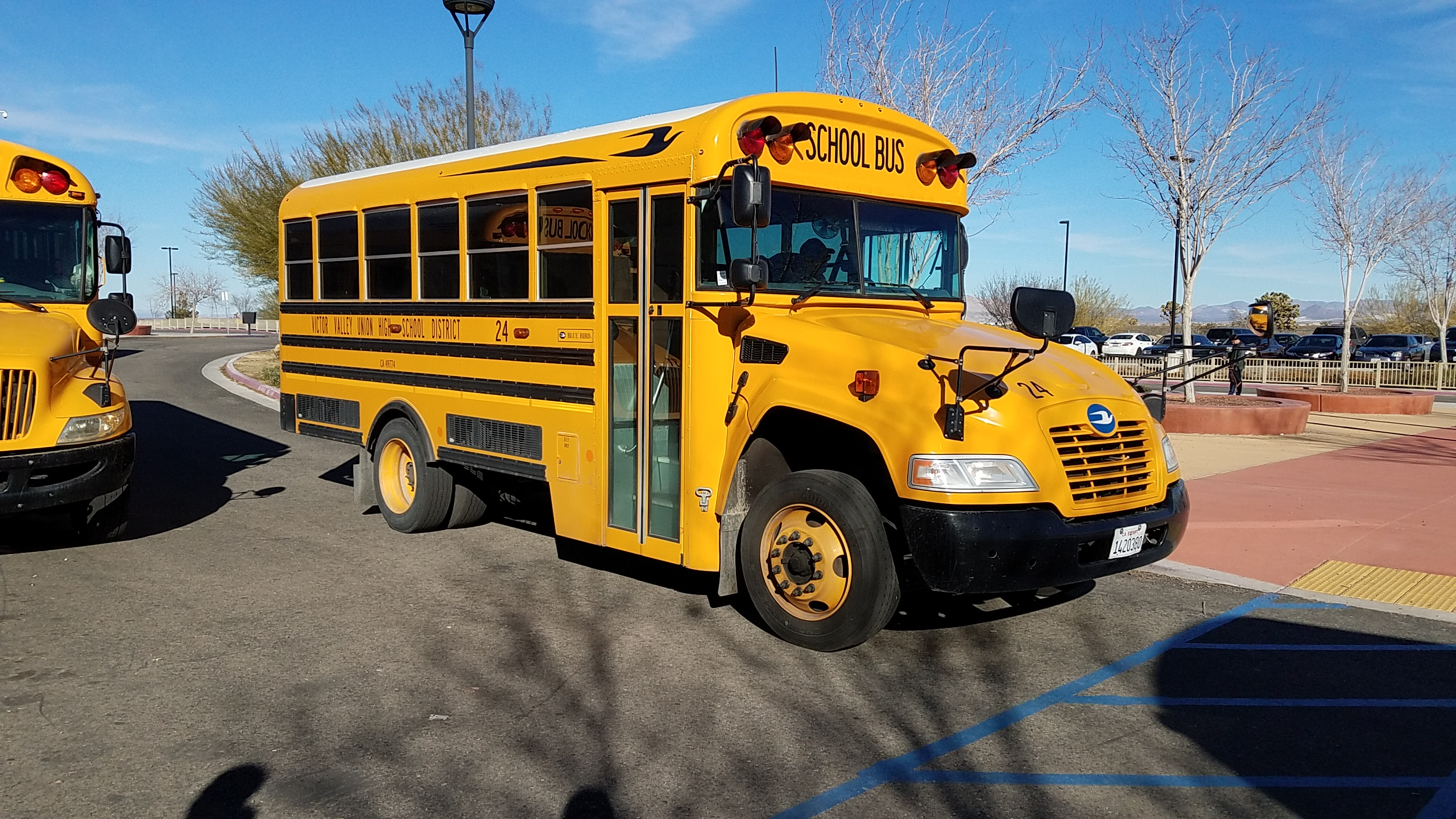
Victor Valley Union High School District bus

== Schools ==
Comprehensive high schools (grades 9-12):

- Adelanto High School
- Silverado High School
- Victor Valley High School

Comprehensive junior high schools (grades 7-8):

- Imogene Garner Hook Junior High School
- Larrea Middle School

Magnet schools (grades 7-12):

- Cobalt Institute of Math & Science
- Lakeview Leadership Academy
- University Preparatory School

Alternative schools:

- Goodwill Education Center
- Victor Valley Adult School

== Feeder districts ==
- Victor Elementary School District
- Adelanto Elementary School District
- Oro Grande Elementary School District
- Helendale Elementary School District
