= Stevie TV =

American comedy television series

- Genre: Comedy; Improv
- Created by: Dan Levy; James Kirkland; Stevie Ryan
- Presented by: Stevie Ryan
- Country of origin: United States
- No. of seasons: 2
- No. of episodes: 14

Production
- Executive producers: Brian Volk-Weiss; Dan Levy; James Kirkland; Jeff Olde; Jill Holmes; Jim Biederman; Laurel Stier; Michael Pelmont; Paul Croce; Stevie Ryan
- Running time: 22 minutes
- Production company: New Wave Entertainment

Original release
- Network: VH1
- Release: March 4, 2012 – July 12, 2013

Stevie TV is an American comedy television series that starred Stevie Ryan and aired on VH1. The series, which aired from March 4, 2012, through July 12, 2013, parodied films, television shows, and actors. VH1 canceled Stevie TV in February 2014.

== History ==
Stevie Ryan moved to L.A. at age 19 to pursue a career in acting and modeling, but she wanted to make people laugh. It was YouTube that inspired Ryan to be funny. She received a camcorder from her ex-boyfriend originally to shoot silent films. Instead, she focused on impersonating celebrities including Justin Bieber, Lady Gaga, Rachel Zoe, and Amy Winehouse. She also developed her own characters on YouTube, such as Mexican-American homegirl Little Loca, and Katrina, who was a parody of poorly behaved teenagers who appear on Maury.

Ryan's portrayals of these characters garnered thousands of YouTube views, which eventually caught the attention of VH1, resulting in her own show on the network.

== Production ==
It was announced in April 2012 that Stevie TV was renewed for a second season, which premiered on May 31, 2013.

== Episodes ==
=== Series overview ===
Season	Episodes	Originally released	
Season	Episodes	First released	Last released
1	8	March 17, 2012	April 22, 2012
2	6	May 31, 2013	July 12, 2013

=== Season 1 (2012) ===
No. overall	No. in season	Title	Original release date
1	1	"Episode 1"	March 4, 2012
Kim Kardashian presents her family board game. A parody of Kendra, Drita and Karen fight over baked Ziti on Mob Wives. Moments with Ryan Gosling. Justin Bieber offers women a "ride" on his birthday. A clip of VH1's new reality series: "Artist Wives". And, Katy Perry encourages a girl to be bad in her new video.
2	2	"Episode 2"	March 11, 2012
Lady Gaga introduces mixed gender action toys. Megan Fox stars in her own sitcom. A clip of The Real Housewives of Beverly Hills. Dave Coulier sees Lindsay Lohan's ghost on Celebrity Ghost Stories. Lost footage of Audrina. A man makes a deadly choice on The Bachelor. A look at the Basketball Wives spin-off, "Basketball Wives:Newark". And, Angelina Jolie plays Jenga. Guest Star: Dave Coulier.
3	3	"Episode 3"	March 18, 2012
The cast of Jersey Shore work for endorsements. A darker look at Toddlers & Tiaras. A man shows off his engagement ring to a drunk girlfriend in a St.Patrick's Day jewelry ad. A kids show teaching you to not drunk text your ex. Stevie plays the New Girl moving in with her creepy roommates. Stevie traces her recent one night stand on The First 48. And, comments from homegirl Little Loca.
4	4	"Episode 4"	March 25, 2012
Paris Hilton's school ad. Jillian Michaels introduces The Hunger Games workout. An unscripted look at Keeping Up With The Kardashians. A mob wife goes on a blind date with two guys on The Bachelorette spinoff. Plus, moments with Matthew McConaughey. Guest Star: Drita D'Avanzo.
5	5	"Episode 5"	April 1, 2012
Jennifer Lopez returns to her block on American Idol. Bad girl Katrina is accused of mothering a baby on a Maury spoof. Deena from Jersey Shore advertises a do sex line. And, the premiere of the hipster soap-opera As The World Whatevers. Plus, scenes from Ice Loves Coco.
6	6	"Episode 6"	April 8, 2012
Lady Gaga's video forcing a straight teen to turn gay. A clip of True Life, and the conclusion of the soap-opera, "As The World Whatevers". Plus, more comments from Little Loca, and Coco tries on a space outfit on Ice Loves Coco.
7	7	"Episode 7"	April 15, 2012
Katy Perry pulls a prank on a customer on her hidden camera show, and a girl wins a dream date with Justin Bieber. Plus, Stevie gets confronted by Mob Wives star, Renee Graziano. Guest Star: Renee Graziano
8	8	"Episode 8"	April 22, 2012
Atlanta Housewife Kim Zolciak gets the Behind The Music treatment. A woman gets pranked on Scare Tactics, a clip of Operation Repo, and Katrina causes chaos on The Bad Girls Club.

=== Season 2 (2013) ===
No. overall	No. in season	Title	Original release date
9	1	"Episode 1"	May 31, 2013
10	2	"Episode 2"	June 7, 2013
11	3	"Episode 3"	June 14, 2013
12	4	"Episode 4"	June 21, 2013
13	5	"Episode 5"	June 28, 2013
14	6	"Episode 6"	July 12, 2013
