= Spring Valley Lake, California =

Spring Valley Lake
- census-designated place
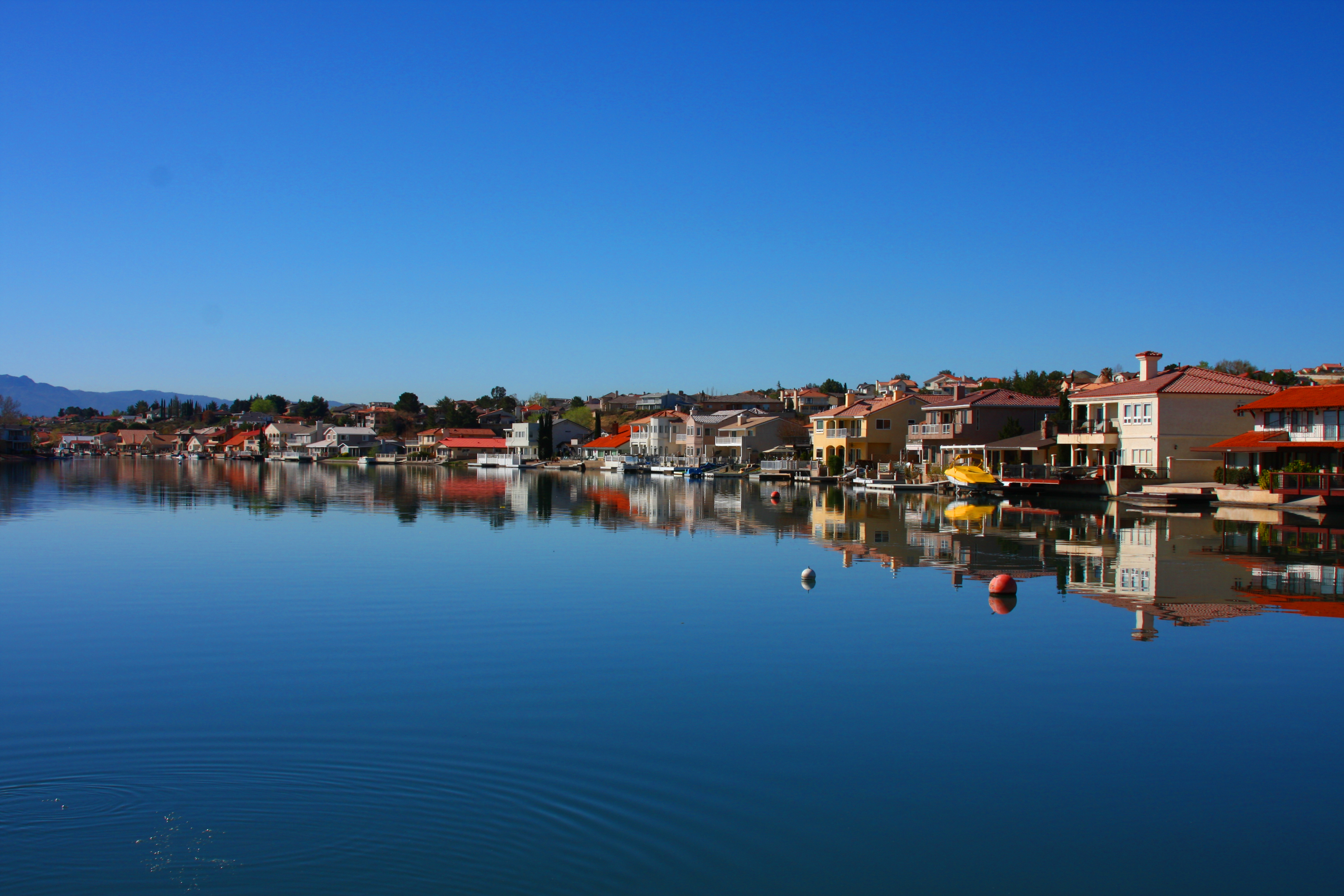
- Homes surrounding the Spring Valley Lake

- Location in San Bernardino County and the state of California

- Position in California.
- Coordinates: 34°29′50″N 117°16′08″W
- Country: United States
- State: California
- County: San Bernardino

Area
  - Total: 3.366 sq mi (8.718 km^{2})
  - Land: 3.024 sq mi (7.833 km^{2})
  - Water: 0.342 sq mi (0.885 km^{2}) 10.15%
- Elevation: 2,779 ft (847 m)

Population (2020)
  - Total: 9,598
  - Density: 3,174/sq mi (1,225/km^{2})
- Time zone: UTC-8 (Pacific (PST))
  - Summer (DST): UTC-7 (PDT)
- GNIS feature ID: 2583150

Spring Valley Lake is a census-designated place in the Victor Valley of the Mojave Desert, within San Bernardino County, California. It is located along the Mojave River. As of the 2020 census, Spring Valley Lake had a population of 9,598.

== Geography ==
Spring Valley Lake sits at an elevation of 2,779 feet (847 m).

According to the United States Census Bureau, the CDP covers an area of 3.4 square miles (8.7 km^{2}), 3.0 square miles (7.8 km^{2}) of it land, and 0.3 square miles (0.9 km^{2}) of it (10.15%) water.

== Demographics ==
Historical population
Census	Pop.	Note	%±
2010	8,220		—
2020	9,598		16.8%
U.S. Decennial Census; 1850–1870 1880-1890; 1900 1910 1920; 1930 1940 1950; 1960 1970 1980; 1990 2000 2010

Spring Valley Lake first appeared as a census designated place in the 2010 U.S. census.

=== 2020 census ===
As of the 2020 census, Spring Valley Lake had a population of 9,598 and a population density of 3,173.9 inhabitants per square mile (1,225.4/km^{2}).

The median age was 40.0 years. The age distribution was 23.3% under the age of 18, 8.3% aged 18 to 24, 24.5% aged 25 to 44, 25.7% aged 45 to 64, and 18.2% who were 65 years of age or older. For every 100 females there were 93.5 males, and for every 100 females age 18 and over there were 91.6 males age 18 and over.

The census reported that 99.9% of the population lived in households, 0.1% were institutionalized, and 100.0% lived in urban areas while 0.0% lived in rural areas.

There were 3,511 households in Spring Valley Lake, of which 32.7% had children under the age of 18 living in them. Of all households, 54.8% were married-couple households, 4.7% were cohabiting couple households, 15.9% were households with a male householder and no spouse or partner present, and 24.6% were households with a female householder and no spouse or partner present. About 20.8% of all households were made up of individuals and 10.3% had someone living alone who was 65 years of age or older. The average household size was 2.73. There were 2,614 families (74.5% of all households).

There were 4,130 housing units, of which 3,511 (85.0%) were occupied and 15.0% were vacant. Of occupied units, 78.7% were owner-occupied and 21.3% were occupied by renters. The homeowner vacancy rate was 6.3% and the rental vacancy rate was 13.4%.

Racial composition as of the 2020 census
Race	Number	Percent
White	5,802	60.5%
Black or African American	612	6.4%
American Indian and Alaska Native	89	0.9%
Asian	670	7.0%
Native Hawaiian and Other Pacific Islander	25	0.3%
Some other race	963	10.0%
Two or more races	1,437	15.0%
Hispanic or Latino (of any race)	2,628	27.4%

== Education ==
It is in Victor Elementary School District and Victor Valley Union High School District
