= Victorville, California =

City in California, United States

- City
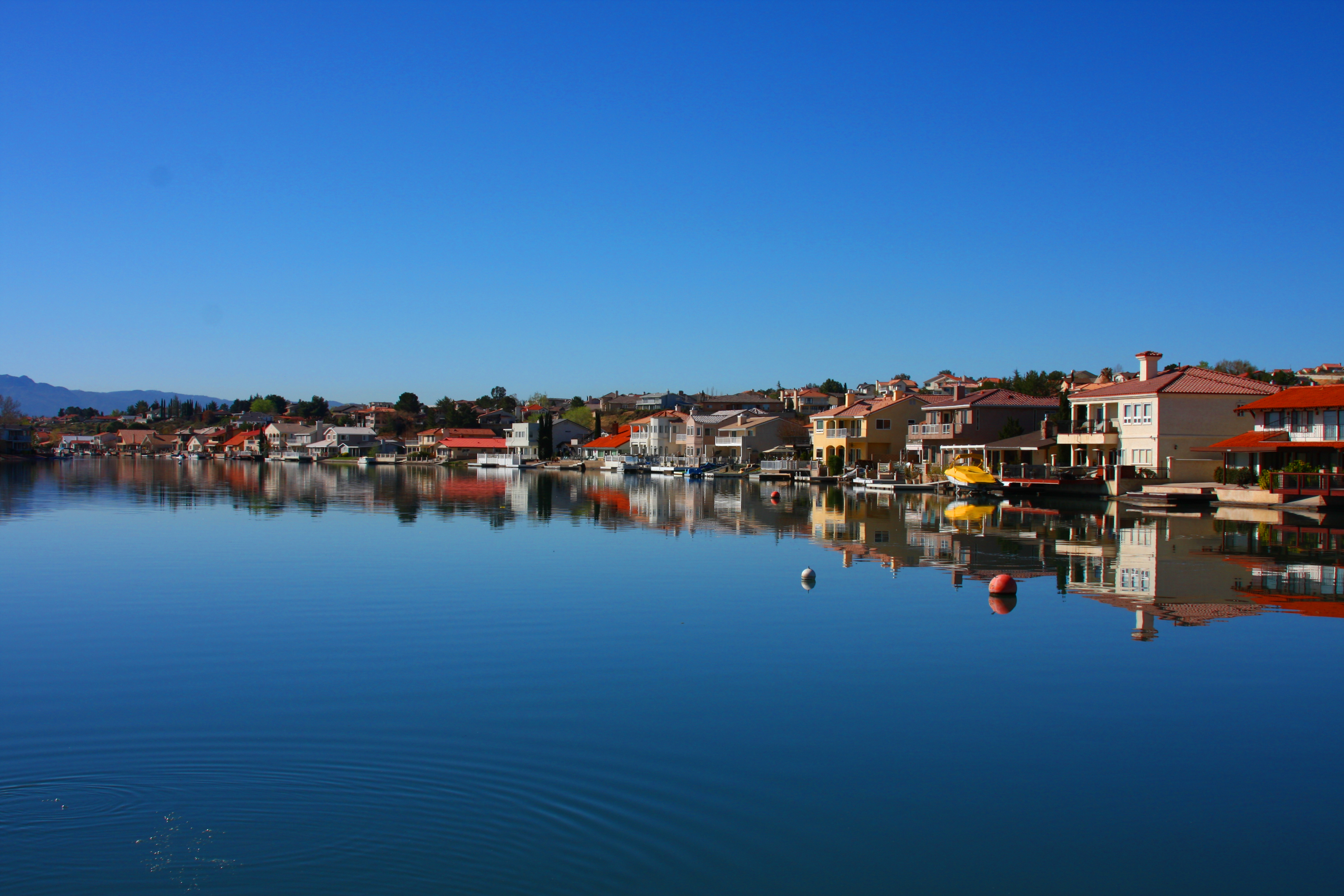
- Spring Valley Lake

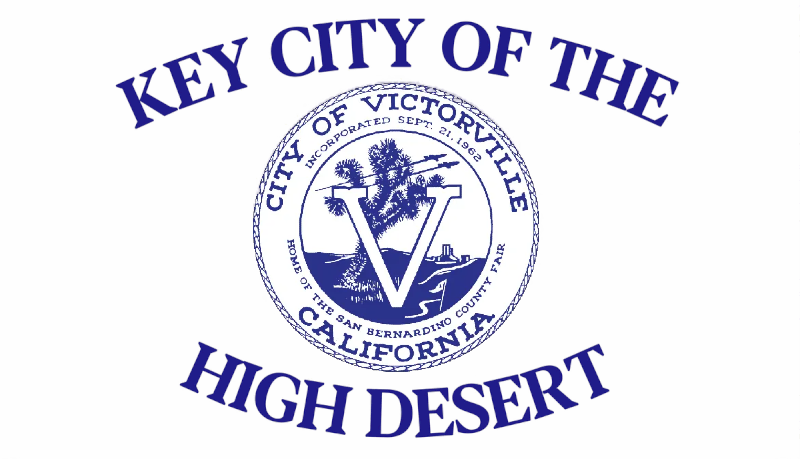
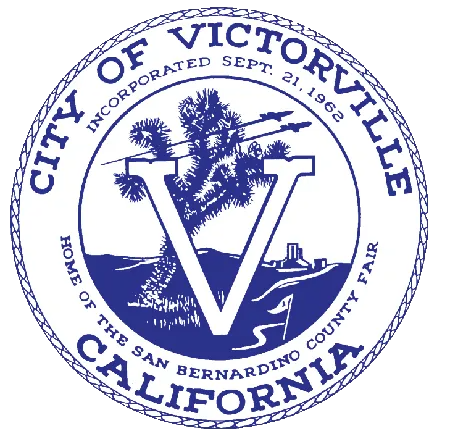
- Flag Seal
- Interactive map of Victorville, California
- Location within California Location within the United States
- Coordinates: 34°32′10″N 117°17′28″W
- Country: United States
- State: California
- County: San Bernardino
- Incorporated: September 21, 1962
- Named for: Jacob Nash Victor

Government
  - Mayor: Elizabeth Becerra
  - City manager: Keith C. Metzler

Area
  - City: 74.00 sq mi (191.65 km^{2})
  - Land: 73.71 sq mi (190.91 km^{2})
  - Water: 0.29 sq mi (0.74 km^{2}) 0.39%
- Elevation: 2,959 ft (902 m)

Population (2020)
  - City: 134,810
  - Rank: 5th in San Bernardino County; 43rd in California
  - Density: 1,828.9/sq mi (706.14/km^{2})
  - Urban: 355,816 (US: 117th)
  - Urban density: 2,700/sq mi (1,042.5/km^{2})
- Time zone: UTC−08:00 (PST)
  - Summer (DST): UTC−07:00 (PDT)
- ZIP Codes: 92392–92395
- Area codes: 442/760
- FIPS code: 06-82590
- GNIS feature IDs: 2412156
- Website: www.victorvilleca.gov

Victorville is a city in the Victor Valley in San Bernardino County, California. Its population as of the 2020 census was 134,810.

Victorville is the principal city of a Victor Valley–based urban area defined by the United States Census Bureau: the Victorville–Hesperia–Apple Valley urban area had a population of 355,816 as of the 2020 census, making it the 117th largest in the United States.

== History ==
The Serrano people were the first Native Americans to inhabit the area.

In 1858, Aaron G. Lane came to what is now known as Victorville and founded a waystation called "Lane's Crossing." For many years it provided shelter and supplies for people journeying across the desert from the east to San Bernardino. Lane's Crossing was on the Mojave River on today's Turner Road, two miles north of where Interstate 15 (I-15) crosses the river. Lane was a veteran of the Mexican–American War who had had malaria during that war. Originally he migrated west to join the California gold rush, but he learned that he could make a better living selling supplies to the miners.

Lane settled in Ione, near Sutter's Mill in northern California, during those years, but migrated to San Bernardino in 1857. He settled on the Mojave River in 1858, where he established his waystation. He later sold out to Texan John Fry Miller, who changed the name of Lane's Crossing to Pioneer Station. Miller was a rancher and became involved in Mojave Valley politics, setting up the first polling place in the area at his home. That first year, ten citizens cast their votes at Lane's residence rather than making the long trip to San Bernardino.

Census records show that ten people lived in two residences on the river by 1860. Listed in Dwelling No. 703 were Aaron Lane, William R. Levick, and the Nicholson family, consisting of George, Frances, and their three children aged 9 to 13. Joseph and Mary Highmoor lived in Dwelling No. 704, with a seven-year-old girl named Anna.

The Levick, Nicholson and Highmoor families were Mormon pioneers. Highmoor established a way station called Highmoor's Crossing near today's Oro Grande bridge of the National Trails Highway (known as U.S. Route 66 [US 66]), over the Mojave River at what is called the Lower Narrows. The Nicholson family moved downriver a few miles and established a way station at "Point of Rocks" in today's Helendale area.

In 1867, Lafayette Meacham, a Mormon who ran a way station near today's Barstow area, made a new wagon road from his stage stop to what is now Old Town Victorville. It crossed the Mojave River at today's Sixth Street. This new road, now called Stoddard Wells Road, was a shortcut across the desert and became a popular route for muleskinners and freighters. The river crossing was called Mormon Crossing and the surrounding area became known by that name.

In the 1870s, Heber "Pete" Huntington established a stage stop, Huntington Station, at Mormon Crossing. Also a Mormon pioneer, Huntington was leader Brigham Young's nephew. Huntington later bought out the Stoddard brothers, who had a waystation halfway to today's Barstow from Victorville, and the Meachams, who ran the stage stop named Fish Ponds or Mormon Grocery.

In 1885, the newly established telegraph station at the railroad siding of "Victor", named for the California Southern Railroad's General Manager Jacob Nash Victor, was the beginning of what developed as today's Old Town Victorville. The village that sprang up around that railroad facility became known by the same name of Victor.

In 1901, at the suggestion of local postmistress Abbey Turner, the U.S. Post Office Department changed that name to Victorville to stop the postal confusion with the town of Victor, Colorado.

In 1926, US 66 was begun, being marked in many areas on existing roads. In Victorville, US 66 is marked on D and Seventh streets, with a section of Interstate 15 going towards the Cajon Pass. It is the primary street through Old Town Victorville.

In 1940, Herman J. Mankiewicz and John Houseman wrote the first two drafts of the screenplay for the film Citizen Kane in Victorville. They worked in seclusion for 12 weeks while residing at the North Verde Ranch, now called the Kemper Campbell Ranch. The quiet ranch allowed Mankiewicz to complete his writing without the temptation of drinking, as he struggled with alcoholism.

The Victorville Army Airfield was constructed beginning in 1941. It was renamed the George Air Force Base when the U.S. Air Force was established in October 1947. After decades of service to the Air Force, in 1992 George Air Force Base was closed. Its land was turned over to other uses. Part of it is now the Southern California Logistics Airport. The former Air Force base housing area is now vacant. It forms a ghost town used for military training by troops from the U.S. Army's Fort Irwin Military Reservation. The Victorville Federal Penitentiary has been built on another part of the former air base.

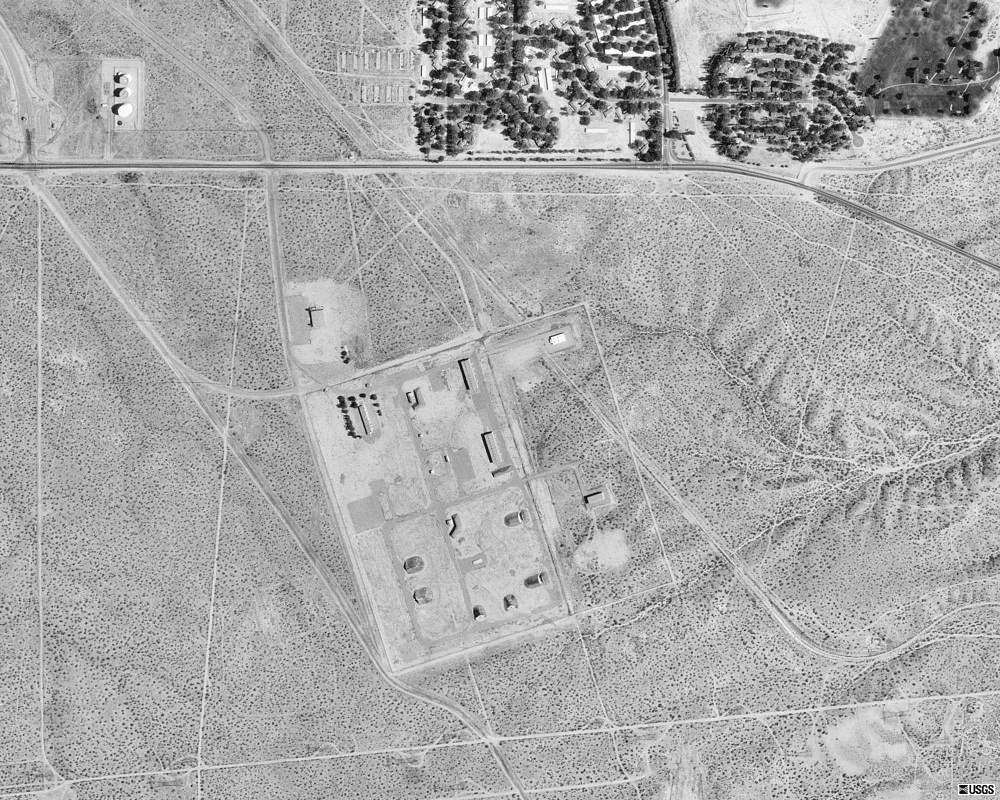
The penitentiary site as seen in 1994

The city of Victorville was officially incorporated by the State of California on September 21, 1962.

In 2003, the Roy Rogers and Dale Evans Museum was moved from Victorville to Branson, Missouri. It closed before 2015.

On November 3, 2007, Victorville hosted the DARPA Urban Challenge, a six-hour autonomous robot driving contest through the streets of the Southern California Logistics Airport. The $2 million first prize went to the Carnegie Mellon University team.

== Geography ==
Victorville is located at the southwestern edge of the Mojave Desert, 81 miles (130 km) northeast of Los Angeles, 148 miles (238 km) north of San Diego, 188 miles (303 km) southwest of Las Vegas, 32 miles (51 km) south of Barstow, 48 miles (77 km) east of Palmdale, and 36 miles (58 km) north of San Bernardino through the Cajon Pass on Interstate 15. Victorville is the location of offices of the "Mojave Desert Branch" of the San Bernardino County government.

Victorville is bordered by Apple Valley on the east, Hesperia on the south, and Adelanto on the west. The Mojave River flows sporadically through Victorville. The elevation at City Hall is approximately 2,950 feet (900 m) above sea level.

According to the United States Census Bureau, the city has a total area of 74.0 square miles (192 km^{2}). 73.7 square miles (191 km^{2}) of it is land and 0.3 square miles (0.78 km^{2}) of it is water. The total area is 0.39% water.

=== Climate ===
The city is in the High Desert, an area known for its unique and moderate weather patterns. The National Weather Service has maintained a weather station in Victorville since 1917. Official records show that Victorville has a cool arid climate (Köppen BWk) with four distinct seasons. Due to the higher elevation and inland location of the High Desert, the climate tends to be more extreme than in the Los Angeles Basin and other Southern California lowland regions.

Winter is the region's wet season, when Victorville receives the most storms. Due to the rain shadow effect caused by the San Bernardino Mountains and San Gabriel Mountains, the rainfall received is less than in the Los Angeles basin or even the San Bernardino Valley. Temperatures tend to be cool, with overnight low temperatures dropping to or below freezing on average. While the high temperatures average around a pleasant 60 °F or 15.6 °C, there are periods in which the high temperature fails to reach 50 °F (10 °C) or even 45 °F (7.2 °C). Low temperatures can dip below 25 °F (−3.9 °C) on occasion, with very cold temperatures possible; the record lowest temperature was −1 °F or −18.3 °C. Snowfall and other wintry precipitation is also possible, although any snowfall tends to be very light and melt quickly; significant snowstorms as seen in the San Bernardino Mountains and San Gabriel Mountains are very rare. Black ice is also possible during the winter.

Summer days are generally hot to sweltering, with average high temperatures approaching 100 °F or 37.8 °C. It is also the time of year in which Victorville, and Southern California as a whole, receives the least precipitation. The higher elevation prevents the temperatures from matching the extreme heat seen in lower desert cities such as Palm Springs or Needles. However, heat waves can still raise the temperature to 110 °F or 43.3 °C, with the all-time record high being 116 °F or 46.7 °C. Also unlike lower desert communities, the diurnal temperature variation is greater, allowing substantial relief to occur at night with average low temperatures approaching 60 °F or 15.6 °C. In the later part of the season, the average precipitation amount experiences an uptick due to the North American Monsoon bringing possible thunderstorms to the region. These thunderstorms can cause flash flooding, lightning, hail, and bring relief from the very hot summer days.

Spring is a transitional season, with warm high temperatures and low temperatures remaining quite cool. Summer-like weather usually begins to appear in May while rainfall tapers off. Autumn also has generally warm to very warm high temperatures on average, with temperatures falling from hot in September to pleasant in November, and rainfall rates increasing. Winter-like weather usually begins to appear by late November. High wind events are common in Victorville year-round and particularly during the spring; they can down power lines and cause dust storms that reduce visibility.

There are an average of 109 days with highs of 90 °F (32.2 °C) or higher and an average of 79 days with lows of 32 °F (0 °C) or lower. The average annual rainfall in Victorville is 6.27 inches (159 mm). There are an average of 28 days annually with measurable rain. The wettest "rain year" recorded was from July 1982 to June 1983 with 12.89 inches (327.4 mm) and the driest from July 1960 to June 1961 with 1.26 inches (32.0 mm). The most precipitation in one month was 5.45 inches (138.4 mm) in February 1944. The most precipitation in 24 hours was 3.00 inches (76.2 mm) on February 24, 1998. Snowfall in Victorville averages only 1.4 inches or 0.036 metres annually. The most snowfall in one month was 38.0 inches (0.97 m) in January 1949, including 31.0 inches (0.79 m) on January 14.

Climate data for Victorville, California, 1991–2020 normals, extremes 1938–present
Month	Jan	Feb	Mar	Apr	May	Jun	Jul	Aug	Sep	Oct	Nov	Dec	Year
Record high °F (°C)	84 (29)	87 (31)	93 (34)	100 (38)	108 (42)	111 (44)	116 (47)	112 (44)	113 (45)	101 (38)	88 (31)	85 (29)	116 (47)
Mean maximum °F (°C)	72.6 (22.6)	76.2 (24.6)	83.1 (28.4)	91.5 (33.1)	97.4 (36.3)	105.3 (40.7)	108.9 (42.7)	107.0 (41.7)	103.5 (39.7)	94.8 (34.9)	81.9 (27.7)	71.7 (22.1)	110.1 (43.4)
Mean daily maximum °F (°C)	58.4 (14.7)	61.0 (16.1)	66.8 (19.3)	73.1 (22.8)	81.4 (27.4)	91.4 (33.0)	97.5 (36.4)	97.0 (36.1)	91.2 (32.9)	79.3 (26.3)	66.9 (19.4)	56.9 (13.8)	76.7 (24.8)
Daily mean °F (°C)	45.8 (7.7)	48.4 (9.1)	53.4 (11.9)	58.6 (14.8)	66.2 (19.0)	74.7 (23.7)	80.9 (27.2)	80.1 (26.7)	74.4 (23.6)	63.3 (17.4)	52.3 (11.3)	44.7 (7.1)	61.9 (16.6)
Mean daily minimum °F (°C)	33.2 (0.7)	35.9 (2.2)	40.1 (4.5)	44.2 (6.8)	50.9 (10.5)	58.0 (14.4)	64.2 (17.9)	63.3 (17.4)	57.6 (14.2)	47.3 (8.5)	37.6 (3.1)	32.5 (0.3)	47.1 (8.4)
Mean minimum °F (°C)	22.1 (−5.5)	24.6 (−4.1)	29.4 (−1.4)	33.2 (0.7)	40.2 (4.6)	47.5 (8.6)	54.8 (12.7)	53.4 (11.9)	45.9 (7.7)	35.6 (2.0)	24.6 (−4.1)	21.1 (−6.1)	19.2 (−7.1)
Record low °F (°C)	−1 (−18)	10 (−12)	14 (−10)	20 (−7)	26 (−3)	35 (2)	36 (2)	41 (5)	30 (−1)	21 (−6)	8 (−13)	6 (−14)	−1 (−18)
Average precipitation inches (mm)	0.97 (25)	1.27 (32)	0.78 (20)	0.33 (8.4)	0.09 (2.3)	0.04 (1.0)	0.22 (5.6)	0.11 (2.8)	0.16 (4.1)	0.31 (7.9)	0.35 (8.9)	0.94 (24)	5.57 (141)
Average snowfall inches (cm)	0.0 (0.0)	0.0 (0.0)	0.0 (0.0)	0.0 (0.0)	0.0 (0.0)	0.0 (0.0)	0.0 (0.0)	0.0 (0.0)	0.0 (0.0)	0.0 (0.0)	0.0 (0.0)	0.0 (0.0)	0.0 (0.0)
Average precipitation days (≥ 0.01 in)	4.5	4.6	3.9	1.8	0.9	0.2	0.9	0.6	0.8	1.3	2.3	3.6	25.4
Average snowy days (≥ 0.1 in)	0.1	0.0	0.0	0.0	0.0	0.0	0.0	0.0	0.0	0.0	0.0	0.0	0.1
Source 1: NOAA
Source 2: National Weather Service

== Demographics ==
Historical population
Census	Pop.	Note	%±
1970	10,845		—
1980	14,220		31.1%
1990	40,674		186.0%
2000	64,029		57.4%
2010	115,903		81.0%
2020	134,810		16.3%
2025 (est.)	141,395	▲	4.9%
U.S. Decennial Census

=== Racial and ethnic composition ===
Victorville city, California – Racial and ethnic composition Note: the US Census treats Hispanic/Latino as an ethnic category. This table excludes Latinos from the racial categories and assigns them to a separate category. Hispanics/Latinos may be of any race.
Race / Ethnicity (NH = Non-Hispanic)	Pop 2000	Pop 2010	Pop 2020	% 2000	% 2010	% 2020
White alone (NH)	30,382	32,804	24,652	47.45%	28.30%	18.29%
Black or African American alone (NH)	7,431	18,579	22,917	11.61%	16.03%	17.00%
Native American or Alaska Native alone (NH)	380	754	692	0.59%	0.65%	0.51%
Asian alone (NH)	2,095	4,341	5,262	3.27%	3.75%	3.90%
Native Hawaiian or Pacific Islander alone (NH)	107	390	672	0.17%	0.34%	0.50%
Other race alone (NH)	143	283	935	0.22%	0.24%	0.69%
Mixed race or Multiracial (NH)	2,065	3,393	4,935	3.23%	2.93%	3.66%
Hispanic or Latino (any race)	21,426	55,359	74,745	33.46%	47.76%	55.44%
Total	64,029	115,903	134,810	100.00%	100.00%	100.00%

=== 2020 ===
The 2020 United States census reported that Victorville had a population of 134,810. The population density was 1,828.9 inhabitants per square mile (706.1/km^{2}). The racial makeup was 29.5% White, 17.9% African American, 2.1% Native American, 4.2% Asian, 0.6% Pacific Islander, 29.5% from other races, and 16.3% from two or more races. Hispanic or Latino of any race were 55.4% of the population.

The census reported that 96.4% of the population lived in households, 0.4% lived in non-institutionalized group quarters, and 3.2% were institutionalized.

There were 37,024 households, out of which 48.3% included children under the age of 18, 47.3% were married-couple households, 7.9% were cohabiting couple households, 28.9% had a female householder with no partner present, and 15.9% had a male householder with no partner present. 15.2% of households were one person, and 6.2% were one person aged 65 or older. The average household size was 3.51. There were 29,605 families (80.0% of all households).

The age distribution was 29.9% under the age of 18, 10.2% aged 18 to 24, 28.0% aged 25 to 44, 21.5% aged 45 to 64, and 10.4% who were 65 years of age or older. The median age was 31.7 years. For every 100 females, there were 98.4 males.

There were 38,928 housing units at an average density of 528.1 units per square mile (203.9 units/km^{2}), of which 37,024 (95.1%) were occupied. Of these, 57.5% were owner-occupied, and 42.5% were occupied by renters.

In 2023, the US Census Bureau estimated that the median household income was $70,663, and the per capita income was $26,955. About 16.4% of families and 19.9% of the population were below the poverty line.

=== 2010 ===
The 2010 United States census reported that Victorville had a population of 115,903. The population density was 1,571.8 inhabitants per square mile (606.9/km^{2}). The racial makeup of Victorville was 56,258 (48.5%) White (28.3% Non-Hispanic White), 19,483 (16.8%) African American, 1,665 (1.4%) Native American, 4,641 (4.0%) Asian, 489 (0.4%) Pacific Islander, 26,036 (22.5%) from other races, and 7,331 (6.3%) from two or more races. There were 55,359 Hispanic or Latino residents of any race (47.8%).

The Census reported that 110,800 people (95.6% of the population) lived in households, 341 (0.3%) lived in non-institutionalized group quarters, and 4,762 (4.1%) were institutionalized.

There were 32,558 households, out of which 17,256 (53.0%) had children under the age of 18 living in them, 17,036 (52.3%) were opposite-sex married couples living together, 6,487 (19.9%) had a female householder with no husband present, 2,397 (7.4%) had a male householder with no wife present. There were 2,478 (7.6%) unmarried opposite-sex partnerships, and 258 (0.8%) same-sex married couples or partnerships. 5,081 households (15.6%) were made up of individuals, and 1,954 (6.0%) had someone living alone who was 65 years of age or older. The average household size was 3.40. There were 25,920 families (79.6% of all households); the average family size was 3.77.

The population was spread out, with 38,023 people (32.8%) under the age of 18, 12,136 people (10.5%) aged 18 to 24, 33,479 people (28.9%) aged 25 to 44, 22,853 people (19.7%) aged 45 to 64, and 9,412 people (8.1%) who were 65 years of age or older. The median age was 29.5 years. For every 100 females, there were 100.4 males. For every 100 females age 18 and over, there were 99.1 males.

There were 36,655 housing units at an average density of 497.1 per square mile (191.9/km^{2}), of which 20,137 (61.8%) were owner-occupied, and 12,421 (38.2%) were occupied by renters. The homeowner vacancy rate was 4.9%; the rental vacancy rate was 11.1%. 66,600 people (57.5% of the population) lived in owner-occupied housing units and 44,200 people (38.1%) lived in rental housing units.

During 2009–13, Victorville had a median household income of $50,034, with 25.3% of the population living below the federal poverty line.

== Economy ==
=== Top employers ===
According to the city's 2009 Comprehensive Annual Financial Report, the top employers in the city are:

#	Employer	# of employees
1	Southern California Logistics Airport	2,073
2	Victor Valley College	1,150
3	Desert Valley Hospital	1,000
4	Verizon	940
5	Victor Valley Union High School District	877
6	Victor Elementary School District	848
7	Federal Correctional Complex, Victorville	844
8	Walmart	830
9	Victor Valley Community Hospital	548

== Government ==
=== Local government ===
Victorville is a charter city and operates with a council-manager form of government.

The current city council members and city manager are:

- Mayor: Debra Jones
- Mayor pro tem: Leslie Irving
- City council members: Elizabeth Becerra, Blanca Gomez
- City manager: Keith C. Metzler

=== List of mayors ===
This is a list of Victorville mayors by year. The mayor is appointed in December.

- 1974–1976 Terry E. Caldwell
- 1978–1980 Terry E. Caldwell
- 1986–1988 Terry E. Caldwell
- 1990–1992 Terry E. Caldwell
- 1994–1996 Terry E. Caldwell
- 1998–2000 Terry E. Caldwell
- 2002–2004 Terry E. Caldwell
- 2010–2012 Ryan McEachron
- 2012–2013 Jim Cox
- 2014–2020 Gloria Garcia – First Hispanic woman mayor.
- 2020- Elizabeth Becerra

=== State and federal ===
In the California State Legislature, Victorville is in the 23rd senatorial district, represented by Republican Suzette Martinez Valladares, and is split between the 34th Assembly district, represented by Republican Tom Lackey, and the 39th Assembly district, represented by Democrat Juan Carrillo.

In the United States House of Representatives, Victorville is in California's 23rd congressional district, represented by Republican Jay Obernolte.

== Education ==
The following school districts serve Victorville:

Elementary and middle school:

- Victor Elementary School District (VESD)
- Adelanto Elementary School District (AESD)
- Oro Grande Elementary School District

High school:

- Victor Valley Union High School District

Unified:

- Hesperia Unified School District
- Snowline Joint Unified School District

Victor Valley Community College also serves the city.

== Media ==
=== Print ===
The Victor Valley Daily Press is published in Victorville.

=== Television ===
KVVB-TV Channel 33 is an independent television station shown on cable and streaming four channels over the internet.

== Transportation ==
Victorville is located along BNSF Railway's Southern Transcon. Intercity rail service is provided at the Victor Valley Transportation Center. The Amtrak Southwest Chief stops in each direction daily. The Transportation Center also hosts Greyhound Lines intercity bus services.

The High Desert Corridor along with current and planned future rail connections in Southern California.

Brightline West is a long planned high-speed rail line at the Victor Valley station in the adjacent town of Apple Valley with direct service from Palmdale or Rancho Cucamonga to Las Vegas. In June 2025, a firm was chosen “by the High Desert Corridor Joint Powers Agency to deliver engineering and design services for a 54-mile (86.9km) rail segment of California’s high-speed rail project between Palmdale and Victorville.” The railway is expected to operate high speed trains at 180 miles per hour (289.6km/h).

FlixBus stops at 14618 7th Street, with buses to several destinations, including Las Vegas, Santa Clarita, and Los Angeles.

Local bus service is provided by the Victor Valley Transit Authority.

The city is home to the Southern California Logistics Airport.

== Landmarks ==
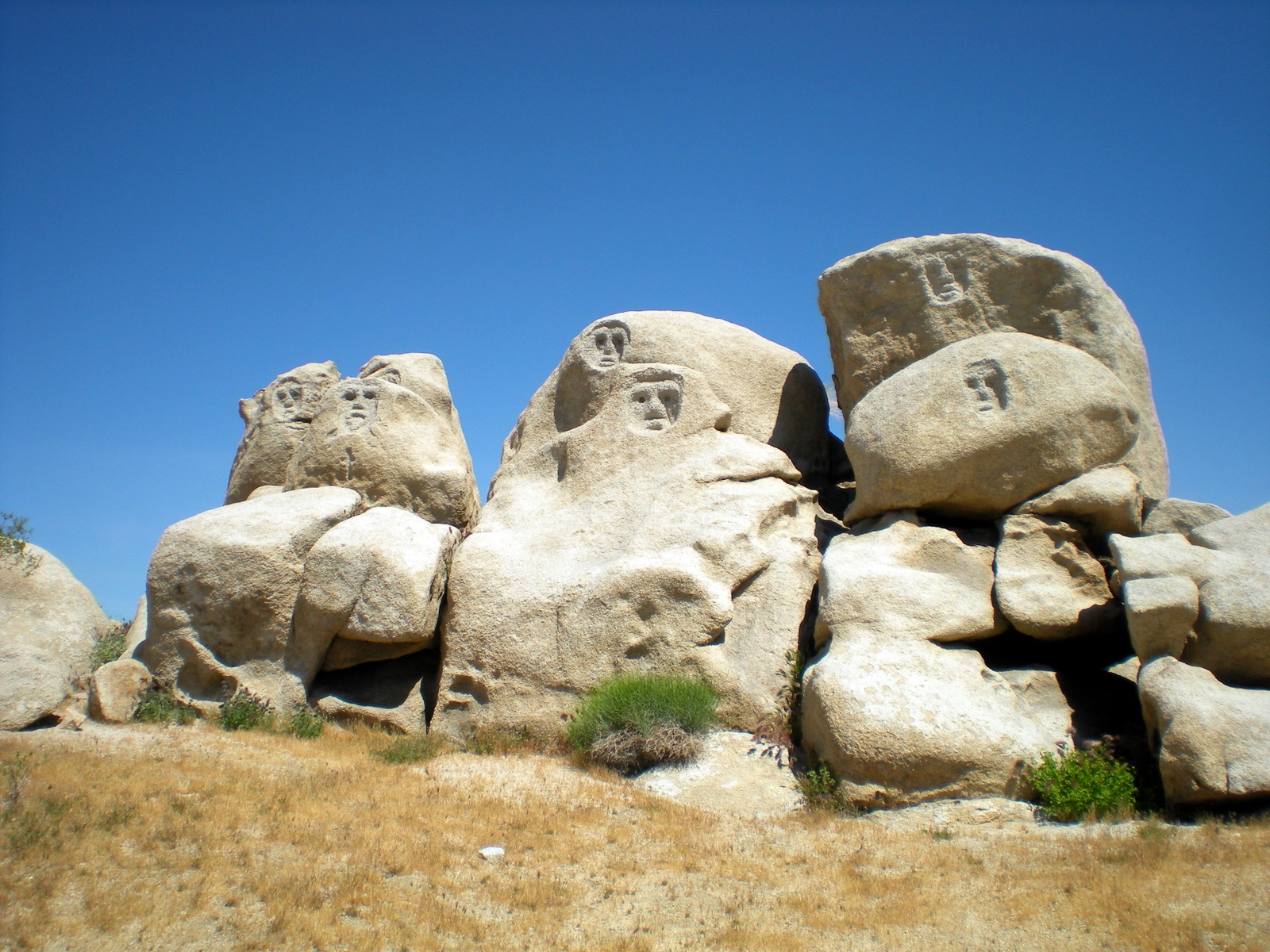
Rock Faces, non-prehistoric petroglyphs in Victorville

There are several notable areas and locations within Victorville such as Spring Valley Lake, the Old Sheriff's Office, and U.S. Route 66.

=== Old Town Victorville ===
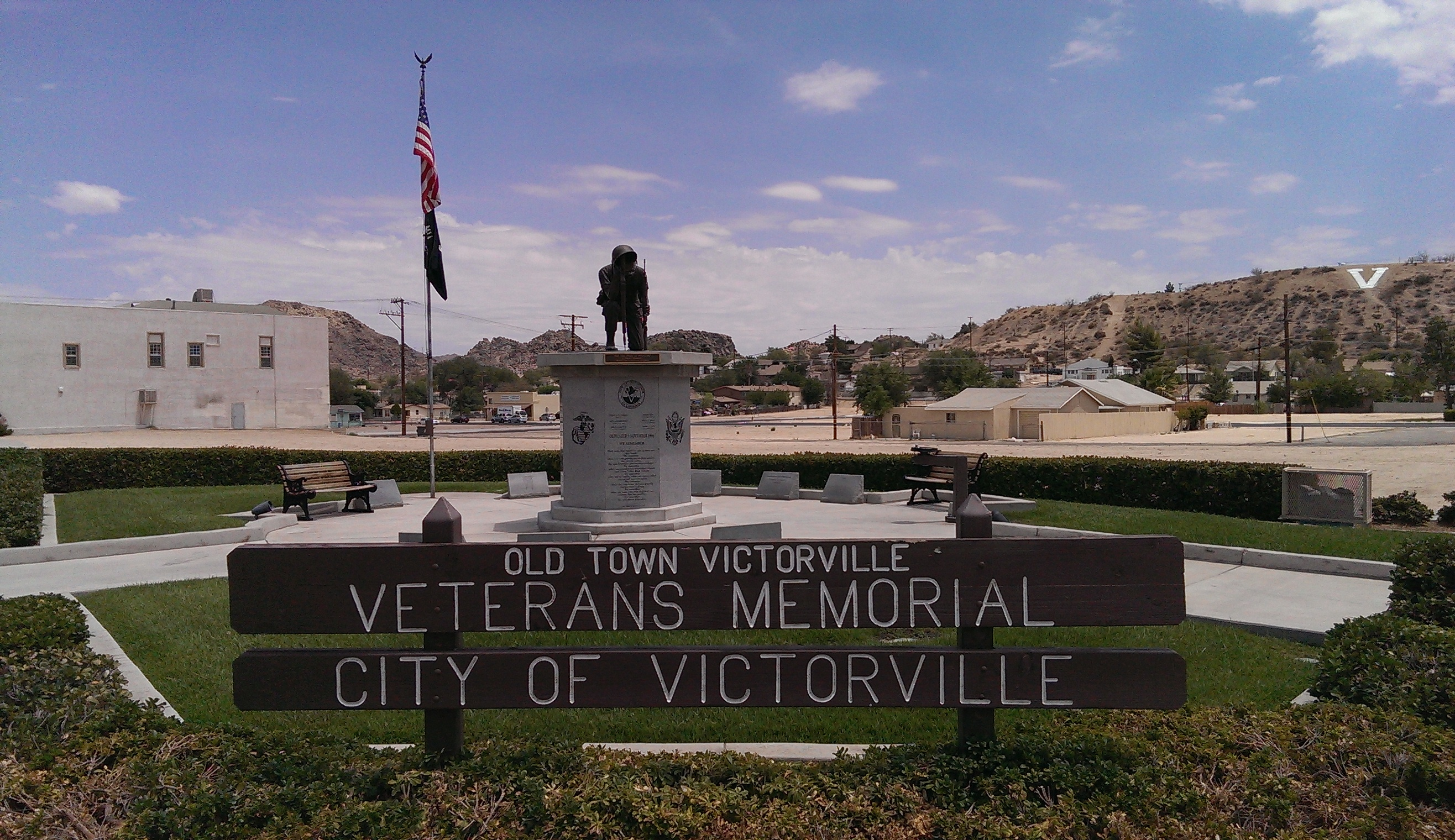
Old Town Victorville Veteran's Memorial

A revitalization project started in 1995 in the ten square blocks along Historic Route 66. After years of setbacks in developing Old Town, the city, with input from residents and local business owners, created an Old Town Strategic Action Plan in 2007. In 2008, demolition of hazardous and dilapidated buildings began. In 2010, as the economy declined, the state eliminated Redevelopment Agencies which had funded the project and further work was put on indefinite hold. As of 2012, the area still had problems with crime and homelessness, and many buildings remain boarded up.

Projects include the Veteran's Memorial on the corner of Seventh Street and Forrest Avenue, the Route 66 Museum, the Transportation Center, and the Old Victor School. Several large murals have been painted on the sides of buildings in Old Town.

== Filming location ==
Victorville has been used for commercial filming several times:

- From Dusk till Dawn (1996), the restaurant scene early in the movie
- Times Like These (Version 2) (2004) was filmed at the Mojave River Bridge in Victorville.
- The Hills Have Eyes (1977) was filmed in and around Victorville.

== Neighborhoods ==
- Sunset Ridge

== Notable people ==
- Mike Alessi, motorcycle racer
- Armida, Mexican actress, singer, dancer and vaudevillian
- Earl W. Bascom, rodeo pioneer, cowboy artist and sculptor, Rodeo Hall of Fame inductee
- Harold Budd, Los Angeles–born ambient composer
- Matt Chapman, Major League Baseball infielder
- Jesse Chavez, Major League Baseball pitcher
- Billy Elekana, professional mixed martial artist
- Ryan Garcia, professional boxer
- Amir Garrett, professional baseball pitcher
- T. J. Houshmandzadeh, former Iranian-American football player.
- John W. Henry, businessman
- Patty Jenkins, writer and director of 2017 film Wonder Woman
- Trever Keith, musician, and front man of punk-pop group Face to Face
- Raven, drag queen and performer
- Tony Renna, racing driver
- Dominick Reyes, MMA fighter and UFC light heavyweight title challenger
- Lee Rodriguez, actress
- Stevie Ryan, writer, comedian, and star of Stevie TV
- LaKeith Stanfield, actor
- Jason Vargas, professional baseball pitcher
- Travis Van Winkle, actor
- Joel Pimentel, vocalist, former member of CNCO

== See also ==
- Victorville Army Airfield auxiliary fields
