= Chris Kwitzer =

American baseball player (born 1995)

Evansville Otters – No. 9
- Infielder
- Born: January 26, 1995 (age 31); Buffalo, New York, U.S.
- Bats: Left Throws: Right

Career highlights and awards
- 2× Frontier League All-Star (2023, 2024); Frontier League RBI leader (2022); Gilded Glove Award (2019); Pecos League All-Star (2018); First-team All-MAC (2017)

Chris Kwitzer (born January 26, 1995) is an American professional baseball infielder for the Evansville Otters of the Frontier League. He played for the Spain national baseball team in the 2023 and 2026 World Baseball Classic qualification.

As of 2025, Kwitzer has played in three of the four active MLB Partner Leagues. He has also played in two of the three active Independent leagues. He has also played in four defunct leagues as well as two foreign leagues. Over his eight year professional career he has played in eleven leagues.

== Early life and college career ==
Born on January 26, 1995, in Buffalo, New York, to Mark and Ann. Kwitzer attended St. Mary's High School in Lancaster. Kwitzer earned eight letters and was captain six times for St. Mary's, where he played hockey and football along with baseball.

Kwitzer played college baseball for the Buffalo Bulls. On February 27, 2017, Kwitzer was named MAC East Player of the Week. In his Senior season he was named All-MAC First team at the third base position. Over 158 games, Kwitzer hit eight home runs, 30 doubles and 11 triples. He held a .287 batting average and scored 73 runs.

He also played three years of collegiate summer baseball from 2014 to 2016. In 2014, he played for the Cortland Crush of the New York Collegiate Baseball League. In 2015, he played for the Adirondack Trail Blazers of the Perfect Game Collegiate Baseball League. In 2016, he played for the St. Cloud Rox of the Northwoods League. In late June, Kwitzer returned to the PGCBL where he played for the Glens Falls Dragons and was named a 2016 PGCBL Eastern Division All-Star. He also participated and won the home run derby.

== Professional career ==
=== Santa Fe Fuego ===
Kwitzer began his professional career for the Santa Fe Fuego of the Pecos League in 2018. After 11 games, Kwitzer joined the Salina Stockade and Hollywood Stars who were guest teams of the Canadian-American Association. After 18 games between the two clubs, Kwitzer returned to Santa Fe where he was selected to the New Mexico Division All-Star team. He also participated and won the Home Run Derby.

=== Pittsburg Diamonds ===
On July 31, 2018, Kwitzer appeared in his first game with the Pittsburg Diamonds of the Pacific Association. In his first game with the Diamonds, Kwitzer hit a grand slam in a 13–3 victory against the Vallejo Admirals.

Over his first professional season across four teams and three leagues, Kwitzer had 33 extra base hits over 75 games while holding a .350 average and 65 runs batted in.

=== Sonoma Stompers ===
In 2019, the corner infielder produced at a .309/.385/.500 clip with 56 RBIs in 58 games for the Sonoma Stompers of the Pacific Association. His play earned him 2019 Gilded Glove winner at the third base position.

In the winter, Kwitzer played for Aguilas Metropolitanas of the Panamanian Professional Baseball League.

=== Washington Wild Things ===
In 2020, Kwitzer signed with the Washington Wild Things of the Frontier League. Due to the COVID-19 pandemic, he played an abbreviated 18 games with the Wild Things where he held a .296 average over 71 at-bats.

He then joined the Jersey Wise Guys of the All-American Baseball Challenge where he hit .352 over 13 games. In September, Kwitzer joined the Saranac Lake Surge of the Empire Professional Baseball League. Over 11 games, Kwizter went 17–44 with six home runs and 15 RBIs.

=== Tri-City ValleyCats ===
On November 9, 2020, Kwizter signed with the Lake Erie Crushers of the Frontier League. In April, Kwitzer appeared in games for the newly formed Party Animals who played against the Savannah Bananas.

On May 21, 2021, the Lake Erie Crushers traded Kwitzer to the Tri-City ValleyCats before ever appearing in a game. In June, Kwitzer served a three-game suspension for an on-field altercation against the New Jersey Jackals. In August, Kwitzer was suspended 12-games by the Frontier League for a benches-clearing fight in the ninth inning against the Sussex County Miners.

=== New York Boulders (2022–2024) ===
==== 2022: RBI leader ====
In 2022, Kwitzer signed with the New York Boulders of the Frontier League. Over 92 games, Kwitzer had a career high 20 home runs, 24 doubles and a league leading 96 RBIs. He also stole a then career-high 13 bases in 14 attempts while holding a .301 average.

In the fall, Kwitzer signed with the Canberra Cavalry of the Australian Baseball League. Over 37 games, Kwitzer had eight extra base hits and 19 RBIs.

==== 2023: First All-Star selection and award ====
In 2023, Kwitzer batted .301 for the second consecutive season over 95 games. He was successful in 21 of 23 stolen bases attempts, which was a career-high. On July 6, 2023, Kwitzer was named an Eastern Division alternate All-Star for the 2023 Frontier League All-Star game. He also participated and won the Outfield throwing competition. On August 7, Kwitzer was named Frontier League Player of the Week where he had a 1.429 OPS, nine RBIs, 2 home runs and a .455 average.

==== 2024 season ====
On April 8, 2024, Kwitzer re-signed with the Boulders. On July 5, he was named an Eastern Division All-Star reserve for the 2024 Frontier League All-Star game. In 93 appearances for the Boulders, Kwitzer batted .271/.321/.436 with 14 home runs, 62 RBI, and four stolen bases.

Kwitzer was released by the Boulders on March 27, 2025.

=== Hagerstown Flying Boxcars ===
On March 27, 2025, Kwitzer signed with the Hagerstown Flying Boxcars of the Atlantic League of Professional Baseball. In 41 appearances for the Flying Boxcars, he batted .201/.253/.306 with two home runs and 12 RBI. Kwitzer was released by Hagerstown on June 20.

=== Cleburne Railroaders ===
On June 24, 2025, Kwitzer signed with the Cleburne Railroaders of the American Association of Professional Baseball. He reunited with his former manager Pete Incaviglia, who he played for with Tri-City in 2021 season.

=== Sioux Falls Canaries ===
On March 11, 2026, Kwitzer signed with the Sioux Falls Canaries of the American Association of Professional Baseball. He appeared in 37 games for Sioux Falls before being released on June 29. In 129 at-bats, he batted .256 with 33 hits, 11 runs scored, 16 RBI, eight doubles, and one home run.

=== Kane County Cougars ===
On July 4, 2026, Kwitzer signed with the Kane County Cougars of the American Association of Professional Baseball. He was released on July 22.

=== Evansville Otters ===
On July 28, 2026, Kwitzer signed with the Evansville Otters of the Frontier League.

== Career statistics ==
=== Independent ===
Bold indicates career high. Blue background indicates league leader.

| Year | Team | Lg | G | PA | AB | R | H | 2B | 3B | HR | RBI | SB | CS | BB | SO | BA |
|---|---|---|---|---|---|---|---|---|---|---|---|---|---|---|---|---|
| 2018 | Santa Fe | PECO | 32 | 158 | 140 | 43 | 60 | 7 | 1 | 11 | 42 | 3 | 1 | 11 | 25 | **.429** |
| 2018 | Salina | CAMA | 9 | 35 | 33 | 5 | 5 | 2 | 0 | 0 | 1 | 1 | 0 | 1 | 12 | .152 |
| 2018 | Hollywood | CAMA | 9 | 38 | 35 | 3 | 10 | 2 | 0 | 1 | 4 | 0 | 1 | 2 | 8 | .286 |
| 2018 | Pittsburg | PACA | 25 | 112 | 95 | 16 | 31 | 7 | 0 | 1 | 18 | 1 | 0 | 15 | 17 | .326 |
| 2019 | Sonoma | PACA | 58 | 273 | 236 | 50 | 73 | 14 | 2 | 9 | 56 | 2 | 2 | **29** | 61 | .309 |
| 2020 | Washington | WASH | 18 | 73 | 71 | 10 | 21 | 2 | 1 | 2 | 8 | 2 | 1 | 1 | 18 | .296 |
| 2020 | Jersey | AABC | 13 | 60 | 54 | 8 | 19 | 3 | 1 | 1 | 6 | 3 | 1 | 5 | 14 | .352 |
| 2021 | Tri-City | FRON | 52 | 154 | 142 | 23 | 37 | 10 | 0 | 5 | 17 | 0 | 0 | 6 | 38 | .261 |
| 2022 | New York | FRON | 92 | 415 | 382 | **68** | **115** | **24** | 3 | **20** | **96** | 13 | 1 | 26 | **104** | .301 |
| 2023 | New York | FRON | **95** | 401 | 365 | 52 | 110 | 21 | **4** | 6 | 48 | **21** | 2 | 28 | 82 | .301 |
| 2024 | New York | FRON | 93 | **418** | **388** | 56 | 105 | 20 | 1 | 14 | 62 | 4 | 2 | 23 | 91 | .271 |
| 2025 | Hagerstown | ATLL | 41 | 154 | 144 | 12 | 29 | 5 | 2 | 2 | 12 | 0 | 0 | 9 | 48 | .201 |
| 2025 | Cleburne | AA | 59 | 233 | 218 | 20 | 49 | 13 | 0 | 2 | 28 | 1 | 1 | 9 | 67 | .225 |
| 2026 | Sioux Falls | AA | 37 | 138 | 129 | 11 | 33 | 8 | 0 | 1 | 16 | 0 | 0 | 7 | 28 | .256 |
| 2026 | Kane County (Note: Kwitzer's first game with Kane County was incorrectly merged with his Sioux Falls statistics and was never corrected by the league, resulting in a discrepancy in the plate appearance totals shown by Baseball-Reference.) | AA | 8 | 23 | 19 | 3 | 2 | 0 | 0 | 1 | 5 | 0 | 0 | 3 | 8 | .105 |
| 2026 | Evansville | FRON | | | | | | | | | | | | | | |
| Career | | | 633 | 2,662 | 2,432 | 377 | 697 | 138 | 15 | 75 | 414 | 51 | 12 | 172 | 613 | .287 |

=== Foreign ===
| Season | Team | G | PA | AB | R | H | 2B | 3B | HR | RBI | SB | CS | BB | SO | BA |
|---|---|---|---|---|---|---|---|---|---|---|---|---|---|---|---|
| 2019–20 | Águilas | 5 | 17 | 14 | 2 | 3 | 1 | 0 | 0 | 0 | 0 | 0 | 2 | 5 | .214 |
| 2022–23 | Canberra | 37 | 148 | 140 | 18 | 34 | 4 | 1 | 3 | 19 | 0 | 1 | 4 | 28 | .243 |

=== College ===
| Year | Team | Lg | G | PA | AB | R | H | 2B | 3B | HR | RBI | SB | CS | BB | SO | BA |
|---|---|---|---|---|---|---|---|---|---|---|---|---|---|---|---|---|
| 2014 | Buffalo | MAC | 25 | 73 | 64 | 9 | 14 | 3 | 1 | 1 | 9 | 2 | 0 | 8 | 16 | .219 |
| 2015 | Buffalo | MAC | **47** | 191 | **180** | 20 | 47 | 6 | **6** | 0 | 18 | **4** | 1 | 7 | 42 | .261 |
| 2016 | Buffalo | MAC | 45 | **195** | 165 | **23** | 47 | **12** | 2 | 3 | 23 | 3 | **3** | **17** | 30 | .285 |
| 2017 | Buffalo | MAC | 41 | 174 | 155 | 21 | **54** | 9 | 2 | **4** | **30** | 2 | 0 | **17** | **38** | **.348** |
| Career | | | 158 | 633 | 564 | 73 | 162 | 30 | 11 | 8 | 80 | 11 | 4 | 49 | 126 | .287 |

== International career ==
=== Spain ===
Played for Spain in the 2023 World Baseball Classic qualification. Played in all four games as a right fielder and designated hitter, with a .313 average (5 for 16, 2B, 2 RBI, BB). He also represented Spain during the 2026 World Baseball Classic qualifiers and was described on the WBSC website as "known to be the centre of the offence."

== Leagues ==
As of 2025, Kwitzer is one of the few professional baseball players to play in eleven professional leagues. Though some of the leagues have lost professional status according to Baseball Reference, below is a list of all of the leagues that Kwitzer has played in.

Career
| Affiliation | League | Period | Team(s) |
|---|---|---|---|
| MLB Partner Leagues | American Association | 2025–present | Cleburne Railroaders |
| MLB Partner Leagues | Atlantic League | 2025 | Hagerstown Flying Boxcars |
| MLB Partner Leagues | Frontier League | 2021–2024 | Tri-City ValleyCats, New York Boulders |
| Independent Leagues | Empire League * | 2020 | Saranac Lake Surge |
| Independent Leagues | Pecos League * | 2018 | Sante Fe Fuego |
| Defunct Leagues | All-American Baseball Challenge | 2020 | Jersey Wise Guys |
| Defunct Leagues | Canadian-American Association | 2018 | Salina Stockade, Hollywood Stars |
| Defunct Leagues | Pacific Association | 2018–2019 | Pittsburg Diamonds, Sonoma Stompers |
| Defunct Leagues | Washington League | 2020 | Washington Wild Things |
| Foreign Leagues | Australian Baseball League | 2022–23 | Canberra Cavalry |
| Foreign Leagues | Panamanian Professional Baseball League * | 2019–20 | Aguilas Metropolitanas |

- *Indicates lost professional status
