= 2015 Pacific Association season =

Independent baseball season

- League: Pacific Association
- Sport: Baseball
- Duration: June 1, 2015 – August 31, 2015
- Number of games: 77 (155 games in total)
- Number of teams: 4

Regular season
- Season champions: Sonoma Stompers 1H (26–11), San Rafael Pacifics 2H (29–11)

League postseason
- Finals champions: San Rafael Pacifics
- Runners-up: Sonoma Stompers

PACA seasons
- ← 2014 2016 →

The 2015 Pacific Association season was the third season of the Pacific Association. There was a four team 77 game schedule. Most series included a three-game series with each team having 39 home games. The Pittsburg Mettle became the Pittsburg Diamonds for the 2015 season.

The San Rafael Pacifics entered the season as defending champions, having won both halves of the 2014 Pacific Association season.

The playoffs concluded on August 31, with the San Rafael Pacifics defeating the Sonoma Stompers 4–3 in the league's 2015 championship game.

== Team and rule changes ==
The four teams in the league played a 77-game schedule. Each team played 39 games for the first and second half of the season. Each half champion would receive a place in the best-of-one championship game.

In 2015, the Sonoma Stompers hired Ben Lindbergh and Sam Miller to advise the team using their 'sabermetrics' theory of player management. They went on to write a book about their experience, called 'The Only Rule Is It Has to Work'.

In June, Sonoma Stompers' pitcher Sean Conroy became baseball's first openly gay professional player. On the Stompers' pride night, Conroy threw a complete game shutout win.

In July, the San Rafael Pacifics used three cameras stationed at different points around the ballpark, and used a robo umpire for the strike zone. Eric Byrnes would then announce balls and strikes.

== Regular season standings ==
as of August 31, 2015

Regular Season Standings
Pacific Association
Pos	Team	G	First half record	Second half record	Season record	Pct.	GB
1	x – San Rafael Pacifics	78	19–19	29–11	48–30	.615	--
2	x – Sonoma Stompers	77	26–11	18–22	44–33	.571	3.5
3	e – Pittsburg Diamonds	77	18–20	20–19	38–39	.494	9.5
4	e – Vallejo Admirals	78	13–26	12–27	25–53	.321	23.0

- y – Clinched division
- x – Clinched playoff spot
- e – Eliminated from playoff contention

== Statistical leaders ==
=== Hitting ===
Stat	Player	Team	Total
HR	Matt Chavez	San Rafael Pacifics	31
AVG	Scott David	Pittsburg Diamonds	.384
RBIs	Matt Chavez	San Rafael Pacifics	85
SB	Matt Hibbert	Sonoma Stompers	32

=== Pitching ===
Stat	Player	Team	Total
W	Gregory Paulino, Max Beatty	Sonoma Stompers, San Rafael Pacifics	8
ERA	Dennis Neal	Vallejo Admirals	2.47
SO	Nick DeBarr	San Rafael Pacifics	115
SV	Steve Chapter	Pittsburg Diamonds	14

To qualify as league leader for hitter, AVG - Minimum of plate appearances of 2.7 per team game. To qualify as league leader for pitcher, ERA - Minimum inning(s) of .8 pitched per team game.

== Playoffs ==
=== Format ===
In 2015, The winner of the first and second half played a best-of-one championship game. The Sonoma Stompers won the first half with a 26–11 record. The San Rafael Pacifics won the second half with a 29–11 record. The Pacifics hosted the Stompers on August 31.

Championship Game
2	Sonoma Stompers	3
1	San Rafael Pacifics	4

=== Individual Awards ===
Award	Player	Team
Most Valuable Player	Matt Chavez	San Rafael Pacifics
Pitcher of the Year	Max Beatty	San Rafael Pacifics
Reliever of the Year	Sean Conroy	Sonoma Stompers
Rookie of the Year	Mark Hurley	Sonoma Stompers
Manager of the Year	Aaron Miles	Pittsburg Diamonds
Executive of the Year	Mike Shapiro	San Rafael Pacifics

=== Defensive Players of the Year ===
Position	Player	Team
C	Isaac Wenrich	Sonoma Stompers
1B	Daniel Baptista	Sonoma Stompers
2B	Yuki Yasuda	Sonoma Stompers
SS	Daniel Gonzalez	San Rafael Pacifics
3B	T.J. Gavlik	Sonoma Stompers
LF	Matt Hurley	Sonoma Stompers
CF	Zack Pace	San Rafael Pacifics
RF	Matt Hibbert	Sonoma Stompers
P	Sean Conroy	Sonoma Stompers

== Notable players ==
Former Major League Baseball players who played in the Pacific Association in 2015

- Jose Canseco (Pittsburg), (Sonoma)
- Aaron Miles (Pittsburg)
- Tony Phillips (Pittsburg)
- Tony Torcato (Pittsburg)

Other notable players who played in the Pacific Association in 2015

- Sean Conroy (Sonoma)
- Fehlandt Lentini (Sonoma)
- P. J. Phillips (Vallejo)
