= 2017 Pacific Association season =

- League: Pacific Association
- Sport: Baseball
- Duration: June 2 – August 31 (Playoffs: September 1)
- Number of games: 78 (156 games in total)
- Number of teams: 4

Regular season
- Season champions: Sonoma Stompers 1H (28–11), Vallejo Admirals 2H (24–15)

League postseason
- Finals champions: Vallejo Admirals
- Runners-up: Sonoma Stompers

PACA seasons
- ← 2016 2018 →

The 2017 Pacific Association season was the fifth season of the Pacific Association. There was a four team 78 game schedule. Most series included a three-game series with each team having 39 home games.

The Sonoma Stompers entered the season as defending champions, having won both halves of the 2016 Pacific Association season.

The playoffs concluded on September 1, with the Vallejo Admirals defeating the Sonoma Stompers 11–8 in the league's 2017 championship game.

== Team and rule changes ==
The four teams in the league played a 78-game schedule. Each team played 39 games for the first and second half of the season. Each half champion would receive a place in the best-of-one championship game.

On May 1, Jonathan Stone was named commissioner of the Pacific Association.

== Regular season standings ==
as of August 31, 2017

Regular Season Standings
Pacific Association
Pos	Team	G	First half	Second half	Season record	Pct.	GB
1	x – Sonoma Stompers	78	28–11	24–15	52–26	.667	--
2	x – Vallejo Admirals	78	12–27	24–15	36–42	.462	16.0
3	e – Pittsburg Diamonds	78	21–18	15–24	36–42	.462	16.0
4	e – San Rafael Pacifics	78	17–22	15–24	32–46	.410	20.0

- y – Clinched division
- x – Clinched playoff spot
- e – Eliminated from playoff contention

== Statistical leaders ==
=== Hitting ===
Stat	Player	Team	Total
HR	Jake Taylor	San Rafael Pacifics	20
AVG	Vinny Guglietti	Pittsburg Diamonds	.360
RBIs	Jake Taylor, Vinny Guglietti	San Rafael Pacifics, Pittsburg Diamonds	65
SB	Matt Hibbert	Sonoma Stompers	36

=== Pitching ===
Stat	Player	Team	Total
W	Demetrius Banks, Tyler Stirewalt	Vallejo Admirals, Pittsburg Diamonds	7
ERA	Tyler Garkow	Sonoma Stompers	2.56
SO	Dakota Freese	San Rafael Pacifics/Pittsburg Diamonds	102
SV	Sammy Gervacio	Vallejo Admirals	18

To qualify as league leader for hitter, AVG - Minimum of plate appearances of 2.7 per team game. To qualify as league leader for pitcher, ERA - Minimum inning(s) of .8 pitched per team game.

== Playoffs ==
=== Format ===
In 2017, The winner of the first and second half would play a best-of-one championship game. The Sonoma Stompers won the first half with a 28–11 record. The Vallejo Admirals won the second half in a head-to-head tie breaker with the Sonoma Stompers with a 24–15 record. The Stompers hosted the Admirals on September 1.

Championship Game
2	Vallejo Admirals	11
1	Sonoma Stompers	8

=== Individual Awards ===
Award	Player	Team
Most Valuable Player	Tillman Pugh	Vallejo Admirals
Pitcher of the Year	Tyler Garkow	Sonoma Stompers
Reliever of the Year	Sammy Gervacio	Vallejo Admirals
Rookie of the Year	Michael Rizzitello	San Rafael Pacifics
Manager of the Year	P. J. Phillips / Takashi Miyoshi	Vallejo Admirals / Sonoma Stompers
Executive of the Year	Kevin Reilly	Vallejo Admirals

=== Defensive Players of the Year ===
Position	Player	Team
C	Isaac Wenrich	Sonoma Stompers
1B	Vinny Guglietti	Pittsburg Diamonds
2B	Ordomar Valdez	Pittsburg Diamonds
SS	Jose Garcia	Pittsburg Diamonds
3B	Chris Fornaci	Vallejo Admirals
LF	Brennan Metzger	Sonoma Stompers
CF	Matt Hibbert	Sonoma Stompers
RF	Miles Williams	San Rafael Pacifics
P	Max Beatty	San Rafael Pacifics

== Notable players ==
Former Major League Baseball players who played in the Pacific Association in 2017

- Travis Blackley (Pittsburg)
- Jose Canseco (Pittsburg)
- Sammy Gervacio (Vallejo)
- Logan Gillaspie (Sonoma)
- Jared Koenig (San Rafael)

Other notable players who played in the Pacific Association in 2017

- P. J. Phillips (Vallejo)
- Stacy Piagno (Sonoma)
- D. J. Sharabi (Sonoma)
- Kelsie Whitmore (Sonoma)
