= 2016 Pacific Association season =

Independent baseball season

- League: Pacific Association
- Sport: Baseball
- Duration: May 31, 2016 – August 28, 2016
- Number of games: 78 (156 games in total)
- Number of teams: 4

Regular season
- Season champions: Sonoma Stompers 1H (23–16), Sonoma Stompers 2H (24–15)

League postseason
- Finals champions: Sonoma Stompers

PACA seasons
- ← 2015 2017 →

The 2016 Pacific Association season was the fourth season of the Pacific Association. There was a four team 78 game schedule. Most series included a three-game series with each team having 39 home games.

The San Rafael Pacifics entered the season as defending champions, having defeated the Sonoma Stompers 4–3 in the league's 2015 championship game.

The season concluded on August 28, with the Sonoma Stompers winning both halves, becoming outright champions.

== Team and rule changes ==
The four teams in the league played a 78-game schedule. Each team played 39 games for the first and second half of the season.

In June, the Stompers signed two female players to their roster. Kelsie Whitmore and Stacy Piagno were the third time since the 1950s that women were on a professional baseball team.

In July, Anna Kimbrell joined Piagno and Whitmore to become the first female battery in professional baseball.

== Regular season standings ==
as of August 28, 2016

Regular Season Standings
Pacific Association
Pos	Team	G	First half	Second half	Season record	Pct.	GB
1	y – Sonoma Stompers	78	23–16	24–15	47–31	.603	--
2	e – San Rafael Pacifics	78	21–18	20–19	41–37	.526	6.0
3	e – Pittsburg Diamonds	78	19–20	17–22	36–42	.462	11.0
4	e – Vallejo Admirals	78	15–24	17–22	32–46	.410	15.0

- y – Clinched division
- x – Clinched playoff spot
- e – Eliminated from playoff contention

== Statistical leaders ==
=== Hitting ===
Stat	Player	Team	Total
HR	Jake Taylor	San Rafael Pacifics	16
AVG	Joel Carranza	Sonoma Stompers	.316
RBIs	Jake Taylor	San Rafael Pacifics	74
SB	Darian Sandford	Vallejo Admirals	99

=== Pitching ===
Stat	Player	Team	Total
W	J.R. Bunda, Mike Jackson	San Rafael Pacifics, Sonoma Stompers	8
ERA	Patrick Conroy	San Rafael Pacifics	2.12
SO	Chris Cummins	Pittsburg Diamonds	102
SV	J.R. Bunda	San Rafael Pacifics	11

To qualify as league leader for hitter, AVG - Minimum of plate appearances of 2.7 per team game. To qualify as league leader for pitcher, ERA - Minimum inning(s) of .8 pitched per team game.

== Playoffs ==
=== Format ===
In 2016, The winner of the first and second half would have played in a best-of-one championship game. However, The Sonoma Stompers won the first half with a 23–16 record and the second half with a 24–15 record, naming them the outright champion.

=== Individual Awards ===
Award	Player	Team
Most Valuable Player	Joel Carranza	Sonoma Stompers
Pitcher of the Year	Patrick Conroy	San Rafael Pacifics
Reliever of the Year	J.R. Bunda	San Rafael Pacifics
Rookie of the Year	Marquis Hutchinson	Vallejo Admirals
Manager of the Year	Takashi Miyoshi	Sonoma Stompers
Executive of the Year	Theo Fightmaster	Sonoma Stompers

=== Defensive Players of the Year ===
Position	Player	Team
C	Mason Morioka	Sonoma Stompers
1B	Lydell Moseby	Vallejo Admirals
2B	Chase Tucker	San Rafael Pacifics
SS	Daniel Gonzalez	San Rafael Pacifics
3B	Gerald Bautista	Vallejo Admirals
LF	Mark Hurley	Sonoma Stompers
CF	Zack Pace	San Rafael Pacifics
RF	Tim Williams	Vallejo Admirals
P	J.R. Bunda	San Rafael Pacifics

== Notable players ==
Former Major League Baseball players who played in the Pacific Association in 2017

- Jose Canseco (Pittsburg)
- Aaron Miles (Pittsburg)
- Trent Oeltjen (Pittsburg)

Other notable players who played in the Pacific Association in 2017

- Anna Kimbrell (Sonoma)
- P. J. Phillips (Vallejo)
- Stacy Piagno (Sonoma)
- Clayton Tanner (Pittsburg)
- Kelsie Whitmore (Sonoma)
