= 2014 Pacific Association season =

Independent baseball season

- League: Pacific Association
- Sport: Baseball
- Duration: June 3, 2014 – August 31, 2014
- Games: 78 (156 games in total)
- Teams: 4

Regular season
- Season champions: San Rafael Pacifics 1H (23–16), San Rafael Pacifics 2H (25–14)

League postseason
- Finals champions: San Rafael Pacifics

PACA seasons
- ← 2013 2015 →

The 2014 Pacific Association season was the second season of the Pacific Association. There was a four team 78 game schedule.

Maui Na Koa Ikaika won the previous 2013 Pacific Association season, but folded in the off-season.

The San Rafael Pacifics won both halves of the 2014 season, earning them their first Pacific Association championship.

== Team and rule changes ==
The four teams in the league played a 78-game schedule. Each team played 39 games for the first and second half of the season. Each half champion would receive a place in the best-of-one championship game.

Hawaii, Maui and East Bay all folded after the 2013 season. The Pittsburg Mettle and Sonoma Stompers were both introduced to the league. Sonoma did not host a home game until July 1 due to field renovations.

== Regular season standings ==
as of August 31, 2014

Regular Season Standings
Pacific Association
Pos	Team	G	First half	Second half	Season record	Pct.	GB
1	y – San Rafael Pacifics	78	23–16	25–14	48–30	.615	--
2	e – Vallejo Admirals	78	21–18	23–16	44–34	.564	4.0
3	e – Sonoma Stompers	78	21–18	21–18	42–36	.538	6.0
4	e – Pittsburg Mettle	78	13–26	9–30	22–56	.282	26.0

- y – Clinched division
- x – Clinched playoff spot
- e – Eliminated from playoff contention

=== Record vs. opponents ===
2014 Pacific Association Record vs. opponents
Team	PIT	SRF	SON	VAL
Pittsburg	—	5–22	8–16	9–18
San Rafael	22–5	—	14–13	12–12
Sonoma	16–8	13–14	—	13–14
Vallejo	18–9	12–12	14–13	—

== Statistical leaders ==
=== Hitting ===
Stat	Player	Team	Total
HR	Joel Carranza	Sonoma Stompers	19
AVG	Jayce Ray	Sonoma Stompers	.355
RBIs	Joel Carranza	Sonoma Stompers	64
SB	Tillman Pugh	Vallejo Admirals	43

=== Pitching ===
Stat	Player	Team	Total
W	Patrick Conroy	San Rafael Pacifics	9
ERA	Dennis Neal	Vallejo Admirals	2.76
SO	Dylan Brammer	Pittsburg Mettle	89
SV	Colin Allen	San Rafael Pacifics	16

To qualify as league leader for hitter, AVG - Minimum of plate appearances of 2.7 per team game. To qualify as league leader for pitcher, ERA - Minimum inning(s) of .8 pitched per team game.

== Playoffs ==
=== Format ===
In 2014, The winner of the first and second half who have played a best-of-one championship game. The San Rafael Pacifics won the first half with a 23–16 record. The San Rafael Pacifics also won the second half with a 25–14 record, naming them the outright champion.

=== Individual Awards ===
Award	Player	Team
Most Valuable Player	Jayce Ray	Sonoma Stompers
Pitcher of the Year	Patrick Conroy	San Rafael Pacifics
Reliever of the Year	Colin Allen	San Rafael Pacifics
Rookie of the Year	Jordan Hinshaw	Vallejo Admirals
Manager of the Year	Garry Templeton II	Vallejo Admirals

=== Gold Gloves ===
Position	Player	Team
C	Andrew Parker	Sonoma Stompers
1B	Mike Orefice	San Rafael Pacifics
2B	Chris Dibiasi	Pittsburg Mettle
SS	Elvin Rodriguez	Vallejo Admirals
3B	Michael Cerda	Vallejo Admirals
LF	Tillman Pugh	Vallejo Admirals
CF	Zack Pace	San Rafael Pacifics
RF	Jordan Hinshaw	Vallejo Admirals
P	Jesse Smith	San Rafael Pacifics

== Notable players ==
Former Major League Baseball players who played in the Pacific Association in 2014

- Eric Byrnes (San Rafael)
- Wayne Franklin (Pittsburg)
- Bill Lee (San Rafael), (Sonoma)
- Aaron Miles (Pittsburg)
- Tony Torcato (Pittsburg)

Other notable players who played in the Pacific Association in 2014

- Charlie Mirabal (Sonoma)
- P. J. Phillips (Vallejo)
