= Aaron Miles =

American baseball player (born 1976)

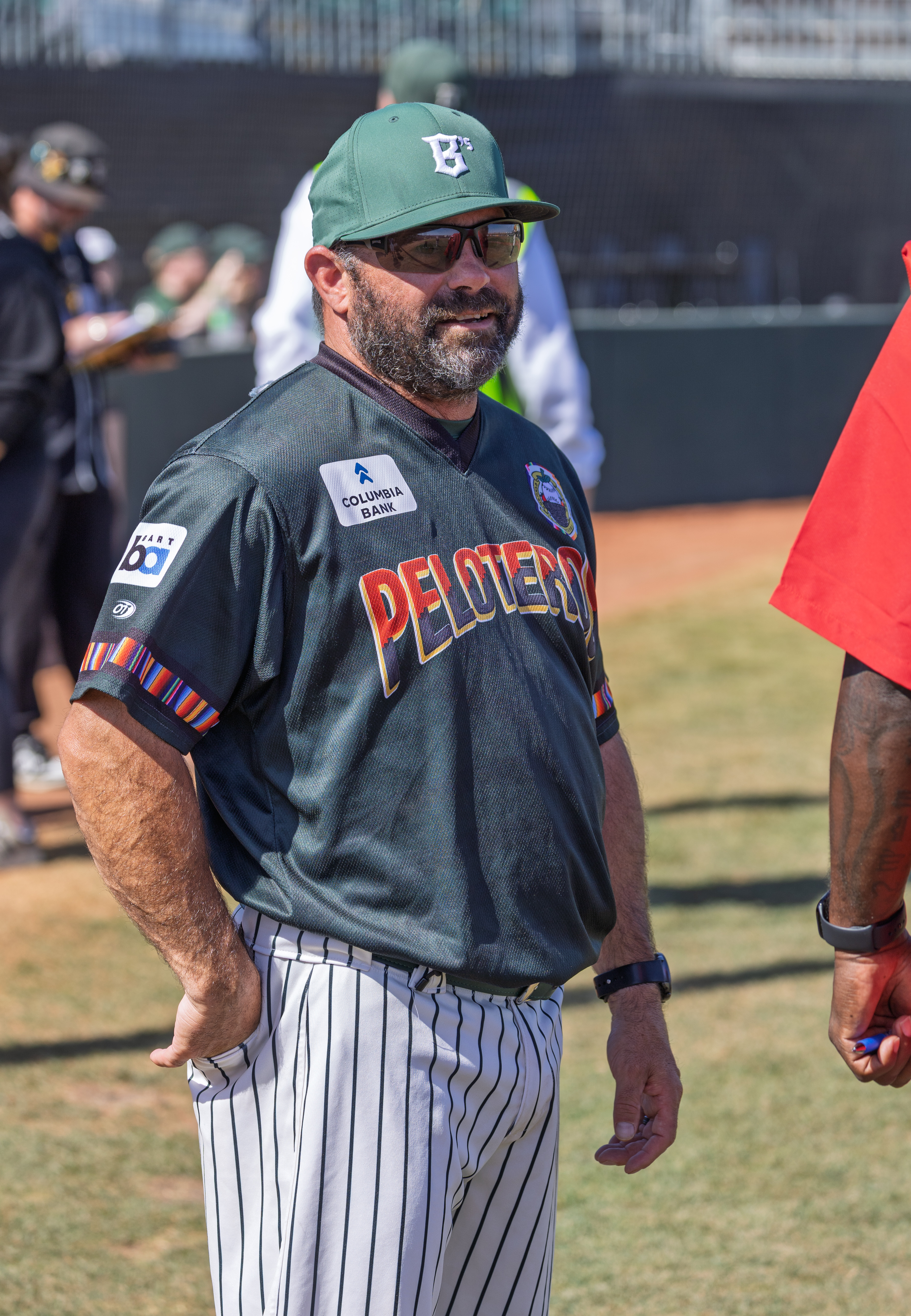
- Miles with the Oakland Ballers in 2026

Oakland Ballers
- Second baseman
- Born: December 15, 1976 (age 49); Pittsburg, California, U.S.
- Batted: Switch Threw: Right

MLB debut
- September 11, 2003, for the Chicago White Sox

Last MLB appearance
- September 27, 2011, for the Los Angeles Dodgers

MLB statistics
- Batting average: .281
- Home runs: 19
- Runs batted in: 229
- Stats at Baseball Reference

Teams
- Chicago White Sox (2003); Colorado Rockies (2004–2005); St. Louis Cardinals (2006–2008); Chicago Cubs (2009); St. Louis Cardinals (2010); Los Angeles Dodgers (2011)

Career highlights and awards
- World Series champion (2006)

Aaron Wade Miles (born December 15, 1976) is an American former professional baseball second baseman. He played nine seasons in Major League Baseball (MLB) from 2003 to 2011 for the Chicago White Sox, Colorado Rockies, St. Louis Cardinals, Chicago Cubs, and Los Angeles Dodgers. He also managed the Pittsburg Diamonds of the Pacific Association. In 2024, Miles was named infield and third base coach of the newly formed Oakland Ballers of the Pioneer League. On July 21, 2024, the Ballers fired manager Micah Franklin and named Miles interim manager.

== Professional career ==
=== Houston Astros ===
Miles was originally drafted by the Houston Astros in the 19th round of the 1995 amateur draft. He played in the Astros minor league system through 2000, making it as high as Class-A+ with the Kissimmee Cobras in 2000, where he hit .292 in 75 games. He was a member of the Midwest League All-Star team in 1999.

=== Chicago White Sox ===
He was selected by the Chicago White Sox in the minor league portion of the Rule 5 draft in 2000. He played with the Double-A Birmingham Barons in 2001-2002. In 2002, he was the Most Valuable Player of the Double-A Southern League while hitting .322 for the Barons. He was promoted to Triple-A with the Charlotte Knights in 2003 and was the International League Rookie of the Year. He made his Major League debut on September 11, 2003, against the Minnesota Twins as a pinch hitter and recorded his first hit on September 18, also against Minnesota. In eight games with the White Sox, he had four hits (including three doubles) in 12 at-bats.

=== Colorado Rockies ===
Miles was traded to the Colorado Rockies on December 2, 2003, for Juan Uribe. He appeared in 134 games with the Rockies and finished fourth in the voting for the 2004 National League Rookie of the Year, while hitting .293 in 134 games.

=== St. Louis Cardinals ===
Miles was traded by the Rockies to the St. Louis Cardinals on December 7, 2005 (with Larry Bigbie) for Ray King.

He won a World Series with the Cardinals in 2006.

On August 4, Miles threw a perfect 8th inning in a 12–1 loss to the Washington Nationals. Of Miles' nine pitches, six were for strikes. It was the first time he had pitched since he was 14 years old. Miles pitched during the game when Cardinals' manager Tony La Russa asked his pitching coach, Dave Duncan, "Who's our shortest reliever?" The tongue-in-cheek answer was Miles, at 5' 8". His pitching career took a turn for the worse later that season. On September 20, he pitched the 9th inning against the Houston Astros and was touched for three hits, including a two-run home run by J. R. Towles. It was Towles' first career major league home run. On June 13, 2008, Miles would make his third pitching appearance, this time against the Philadelphia Phillies. With the Phillies leading, 20–2, Miles came in to finish off the game with a perfect 9th inning while striking out Jimmy Rollins.

On August 31, a foul ball hit by Miles struck teammate Juan Encarnación in the face while he was in the on-deck circle, and effectively ended Encarnación's career. Encarnación suffered multiple fractures to his left eye socket and an injury to his left eye and missed the remainder of the 2007 season. The injury was regarded by the Cardinals' head team physician, Dr. George Paletta, to be the worst injury he'd ever seen to the face on a baseball player. Paletta said the eye socket was essentially crushed on impact. Paletta also said the eyeball had not been ruptured.

Miles re-signed with the Cardinals for a one-year deal on January 4, 2008, after a non-tender and short free-agency status in December 2007.

On July 20, 2008, Miles got his first walk-off hit, a one-out grand slam to beat the San Diego Padres, 9–5.

=== Chicago Cubs ===
On December 31, 2008, Miles signed a two-year deal with the Chicago Cubs. He was the primary backup infielder to second baseman Mike Fontenot, shortstop Ryan Theriot and third baseman Aramis Ramírez, after losing the starting job at second to Fontenot during Spring Training.

=== Oakland/Cincinnati/St. Louis ===
On December 3, 2009, Miles was traded along with Jake Fox to the Oakland Athletics for Jeff Gray and two minor league prospects. On February 1, 2010, he was again traded along with a player to be named later to the Cincinnati Reds for Willy Taveras and Adam Rosales. He was released on April 14, after being designated for assignment at the end of spring training.

On April 27, 2010, Miles signed a minor league deal to return to the Cardinals. After a brief AAA stop, he rejoined the major league roster.

=== Los Angeles Dodgers ===
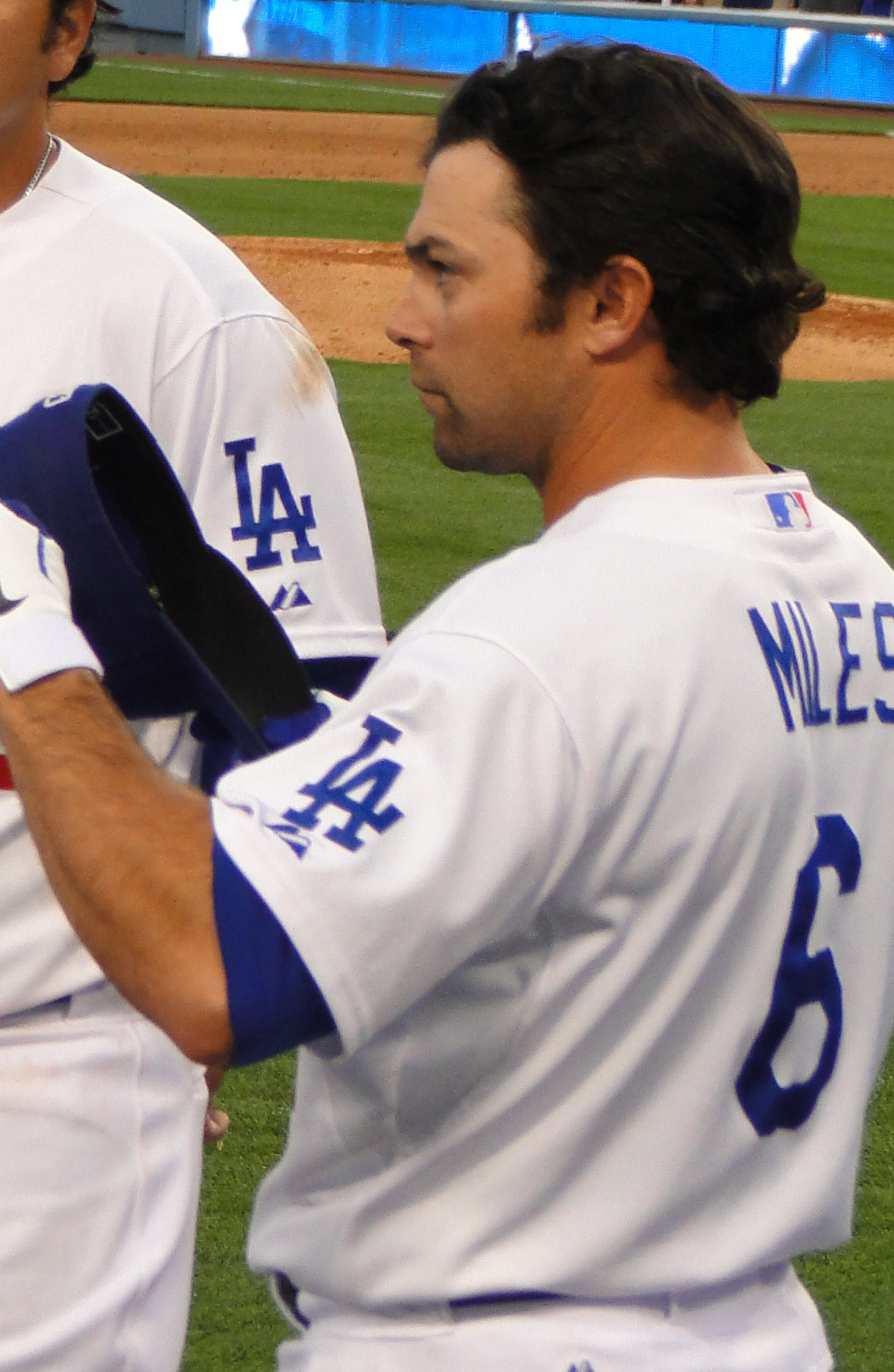
Aaron Miles with the Dodgers, April 2011

On February 7, 2011, Miles signed a minor league deal with the Los Angeles Dodgers with an invitation to spring training. He made the opening day roster. He had his first home run as a Dodger and first in over 530 at-bats [over two years] vs Minnesota Twins starter Brian Duensing at Target Field on June 28, 2011. Miles played in 136 games with the Dodgers, the most of his career, primarily due to injuries to Juan Uribe and Casey Blake. He hit .275 with 17 doubles. After not signing with any team for 2012, he re-signed with the Dodgers on a minor league contract on May 11. He played in 18 games with the AAA Albuquerque Isotopes, hitting .235.

Miles announced his retirement on June 13, 2012.

== Coaching career ==
=== Pittsburg Mettle/Diamonds ===
For the 2014 season, he was hired as the bench coach for the new Pittsburg Mettle franchise of the Pacific Association. In 2015, Miles became manager of the renamed Diamonds. In his first season, the Diamonds saw a 16 game win improvement, earning him Manager of the Year honors. Over four seasons, Miles held a 146–167 record.

=== Dublin Leprechauns ===
In 2023, Miles was to appear as manager for the Dublin Leprechauns inaugural season of the Pecos League, but only assisted in a few games instead.

=== Oakland Ballers ===
In 2024, Miles was named infield and third base coach of the newly formed Oakland Ballers of the Pioneer League. On July 21, 2024, the Ballers fired manager Micah Franklin and named Miles interim manager. In 2025 Miles led the Oakland Ballers to their first Pioneer league championship title over the Idaho Falls Chukars in just the franchise’s second season of operation.

=== Managerial record ===
As of September 10, 2026

Team	Year	Regular season					Postseason			
Team	Year	Games	Won	Lost	Win %	Finish	Won	Lost	Win %	Result
PIT	2015	77	38	39	.494	3rd	–	–	–	–
PIT	2016	78	36	42	.462	3rd	–	–	–	–
PIT	2017	78	36	42	.462	t-2nd	–	–	–	–
PIT	2018	80	36	44	.450	4th	0	1	.000	Lost semifinal (Sonoma)
PIT total		313	146	167	.466		0	1	.000	
OAK	2024	42	29	13	.690	2nd (Note: Miles replaced Micah Franklin with 42 regular season games remaining)	1	2	.333	Lost semifinals (Yolo)
OAK	2025	96	73	23	.760	1st	5	3	.625	Won semifinals (Ogden) 2–1; Won finals (Idaho) 3–2
OAK	2026	96	46	50	.479	8th	–	–	–	–
OAK total		234	148	86	.632		6	5	.545	
Total		547	294	253	.537		6	6	.500	

== Personal life ==
He is a graduate of Antioch High School, in Antioch, California. He lives in Brentwood, California, with his wife Lauren, and four children.

In spring training of 2000, several of his teammates from the Houston Astros organization were in their hotel when two gunmen burst into their room. Miles was in the next room and the gunmen took him hostage. The police arrived before the gunmen were able to take him to their getaway car, but one gunman fled the scene. The other forced Miles back into his room where he ended up wrestling the gunman to the ground. The police entered the room and shot the gunman while Miles held him to the floor. The gunman survived his wounds, and his accomplice was later captured.
