= Hollywood star =

Hollywood star can refer to:

- The Hollywood Star newspaper and magazine, a celebrity gossip publication of the 1970s.
- Movie stars, celebrities who are famous, for their starring, or leading, roles in motion pictures.
- The star system, the method of creating and promoting movie stars in classical Hollywood cinema.
- The Hollywood Walk of Fame, a sidewalk in Hollywood, Los Angeles, which is embedded with more than 2,000 five-pointed stars celebrating famous actors and movie characters

Two baseball teams have been known as the Hollywood Stars:

- Hollywood Stars, a Minor League Baseball team active from 1926 to 1935, and from 1938 to 1957
- Hollywood Stars (Pecos League), a professional baseball team competing in the Pecos league, founded in 2016
