= Henry Omana =

Mexican baseball player (born 1994)

Charleston Dirty Birds – No. 18
- Pitcher
- Born: May 3, 1994 (age 32); Walnut, California, U.S.
- Bats: Right Throws: Right

Henry Omana (born May 3, 1994) is a Mexican professional baseball pitcher for the Charleston Dirty Birds of the Atlantic League of Professional Baseball. Omana is listed at 6 feet 4 inches (1.93 m) and 222 pounds (101 kg).

== Early life ==
Omana was born in Walnut, California and attended Diamond Bar High School where he played three years of varsity baseball under head coach Eric Shibley. He was named two-time all-Hacienda League and held an ERA under two in both his Junior and Senior seasons. He also lettered on the football team where he was named first team all-league at quarterback. In three seasons, he threw for 2,992 yards and 29 touchdowns. His play earned interest from Colorado and Oregon State. Omana ultimately committed to the Cal State Fullerton baseball team.

On February 16, 2013, Omana made his collegiate debut against Nebraska where he struck out three batters in a scoreless inning. In five relief appearances, Omana had seven strikeouts in 4 2/3 innings pitched. In 2014, Omana utilized a redshirt. In 2015, Omana made seven relief appearances totaling 5 1/3 innings pitched and six strikeouts. In 2017, Omana transferred to Cal Poly Pomona where he went 6–5 with a 2.48 ERA over 16 starts in 94 1/3 innings. Omana also led the team with 94 strikeouts and two complete games.

== Professional career ==
=== Acereros de Monclova ===
On July 17, 2017, Omana signed with the Acereros de Monclova of the Mexican League. On July 19, Omana made his professional debut against the Guerreros de Oaxaca where he had five strikeouts over three scoreless innings.

=== Pericos de Puebla ===
On December 11, 2017, Omana was one of four players traded to the Pericos de Puebla of the Mexican League in exchange for Josh Roenicke. In 10 appearances for Puebla in 2018, Omana struggled to an 0-1 record and 7.98 ERA with six strikeouts across 14 2/3 innings pitched.

=== Sonoma Stompers ===
In 2019, Omana signed with the Sonoma Stompers of the Pacific Association. In five stars, Omana went 3–1 in 27 innings pitched with 36 strikeouts and a 1.33 ERA.

=== Tecolotes de los Dos Laredos ===
On July 10, 2019, Omana signed with the Bravos de León of the Mexican League but did not appear in a game. On July 24, Omana signed with the Tecolotes de los Dos Laredos where he finished the season. Omana did not play in a game in 2020 due to the cancellation of the Mexican League season because of the COVID-19 pandemic. In 2021, Omana went 3–5 over 17 appearances and six starts. In 37 2/3 innings he had 39 strikeouts.

=== Capitales de Québec ===
On August 17, 2021, Omana signed with Équipe Québec of the Frontier League.

=== Mariachis de Guadalajara ===
On May 3, 2022, Omana signed with the Mariachis de Guadalajara of the Mexican League. After one appearance, Omana re–signed with Capitales de Québec, where he would win the Frontier League championship.

=== Windy City Thunderbolts ===
On December 8, 2022, Omana signed with the Windy City Thunderbolts of the Frontier League. On May 22, he was named pitcher of the week following a complete game shutout against Trois-Rivieres Aigles. Omana was named to the Frontier League All-star team where he held a 4–0 record over 35 2/3 innings pitched with 46 strikeouts. Omana also had a career best 0.76 ERA.

=== Olmecas de Tabasco ===
On February 16, 2024, Omana signed with the Olmecas de Tabasco of the Mexican League. In 18 appearances for Tabasco, he recorded a 3.62 ERA with 31 strikeouts across 27 1/3 innings pitched. After the completion of the LMB season, Omana signed with Águilas del Zulia of the Venezuelan Professional Baseball League on September 7.

Omana made six appearances for Tabasco in 2025, but struggled to a 9.82 ERA with seven strikeouts across 3 2/3 innings pitched. Omana was released by the Olmecas on May 29, 2025.

=== Tigres de Quintana Roo ===
On June 6, 2025, Omana signed with the Tigres de Quintana Roo of the Mexican League. In 19 appearances for Quintana Roo, Omana compiled a 2-1 record and 6.98 ERA with 16 strikeouts and two saves across 19 1/3 innings pitched.

=== Winnipeg Goldeyes ===
On August 12, 2025, Omana signed with the Winnipeg Goldeyes of the American Association of Professional Baseball. He was signed less than a week after the conclusion of the Mexican League season.

=== Charleston Dirty Birds ===
On May 13, 2026, Omana signed with the Charleston Dirty Birds of the Atlantic League of Professional Baseball.

== Career statistics ==
=== LMB ===
Season	Team	G	GS	W	L	ERA	CG	SHO	SV	IP	H	R	ER	HR	BB	SO
2017	Monclova	5	1	0	1	4.82	0	0	0	9.1	6	5	5	0	4	10
2018	Puebla	10	1	0	1	7.98	0	0	0	14.2	14	16	13	3	15	6
2019	Dos Laredos	7	3	1	2	7.65	0	0	0	20.0	26	19	17	7	10	19
2020	Dos Laredos	Season cancelled (COVID-19 pandemic)														
2021	Dos Laredos	17	6	3	5	6.93	0	0	0	37.2	47	31	29	4	28	39
2022	Guadalajara	1	0	0	0	9.00	0	0	0	1.0	2	1	1	0	0	3
2024	Tabasco	18	0	0	0	3.62	0	0	0	27.1	26	14	11	7	11	31
2025	Tabasco	6	0	0	0	9.82	0	0	0	3.2	6	4	4	1	4	7
2025	Quintana Roo	19	0	2	1	6.98	0	0	2	19.1	17	16	15	2	17	16
Career		83	11	6	11	6.43	0	0	2	133.0	144	106	95	24	89	131

=== Independent ===
Season	Team	Lg	G	GS	W	L	ERA	CG	SHO	SV	IP	H	R	ER	HR	BB	SO
2019	Sonoma	PACA	5	5	3	1	1.33	0	0	0	27.0	19	5	4	1	8	36
2021	Québec	FRON	6	6	2	0	4.50	0	0	0	30.0	23	15	15	6	20	30
2022	Québec	FRON	25	6	2	2	2.77	0	0	0	52.0	37	16	16	6	18	58
2023	Windy City	FRON	6	6	4	0	0.76	1	1	0	35.2	17	3	3	2	12	46
2025	Winnipeg	AA	9	1	0	0	1.50	0	0	0	12.0	7	3	2	1	8	9
2026	Charleston	ATLL															
Career			51	24	11	3	2.30	1	1	0	156.2	103	42	40	16	66	179

=== College ===
Season	Team	Lg	G	GS	W	L	ERA	CG	SHO	SV	IP	H	R	ER	HR	BB	SO
2013	CS Fullerton	BWC	5	0	0	0	7.71	0	0	0	4.2	9	4	4	1	5	7
2014	CS Fullerton	BWC	Redshirted (redshirt)														
2015	CS Fullerton	BWC	7	0	0	0	11.81	0	0	0	5.1	9	7	7	1	1	6
2016	Cal Poly Pomona	CCAA	DNP (transfer)														
2017	Cal Poly Pomona	CCAA	16	16	6	5	2.48	2	0	0	94.1	70	34	26	4	24	92
Career			28	16	6	5	3.19	2	0	0	104.1	88	45	37	6	30	105
