= Charlie Mirabal =

Venezuelan baseball player

- Infielder
- Born: April 2, 1987 (age 38); Caracas, Venezuela
- Bats: Switch Throws: Right
- Stats at Baseball Reference
Medals
Men's baseball
Representing Colombia
Bolivarian Games
| Gold medal – first place | 2017 Santa Marta | Team |

Charlie Peter Mirabal (born April 2, 1987) is a Venezuelan born Colombian former professional baseball infielder. Listed at 5 feet 11 inches (1.80 m) and 180 pounds (82 kg), Mirabal throws right-handed and is a switch hitter. He has played for the Colombia national baseball team and the Los Angeles Dodgers organization in Minor League Baseball.

== Baseball career ==
=== Minor League Baseball (2007–2012) ===
Mirabal spent six seasons in the Los Angeles Dodgers organization. In 2011, Mirabal reached the AAA ranks with the Albuquerque Isotopes affiliate. Mirabal was primarily used as a middle infielder with his primary play at the shortstop position. He also had success on the mound, holding a 5–2 record with three saves and a 1.96 ERA over 36.2 innings pitched. In 2012, Mirabal received a Major League Baseball spring training invitation from the Dodgers where he appeared in one game. On January 4, 2013, Mirabal was released.

=== Independent Leagues (2013–2014) ===
==== Na Koa Ikaika Maui ====
In 2013, Mirabal signed with Na Koa Ikaika Maui of the newly formed Pacific Association. On June 20, Mirabal made his Independent Baseball debut. Mirabal logged a .278 average in 54 games while hitting six doubles and 21 RBIs. Maui defeated San Rafael in the championship game, where Mirabal went 1-4 with a RBI.

==== Amarillo Sox ====
On December 4, 2013, Mirabal signed with the Amarillo Sox of the American Association. He appeared in 13 games, recording just four base hits. Mirabal was released by the Sox on June 3, 2014.

==== Sonoma Stompers ====
In 2014, Mirabal signed with the Sonoma Stompers of the Pacific Association. In 53 games, Mirabal hit .238 with seven doubles and three home runs.

=== Foreign Leagues (2013–2024) ===
==== Toros de Sincelejo ====
In 2013, Mirabal played with Toros de Sincelejo of the Colombian Professional Baseball League where he spent five winters. He also played for the Caimanes de Barranquilla in the 2018-2019 season.

==== Parma Baseball Club ====
In 2016, Mirabal signed with the Parma Baseball Club of the Italian Baseball League. He appeared in 133 games over five seasons. Mirabal held a .310 batting average with nine home runs and 27 doubles with 79 RBIs.

==== Collecchio Baseball Club ====
In 2021, Mirbal had a brief postseason stint with the Collecchio Baseball Club of the Italian Baseball League. Mirabal appeared in two games where he registered two hits. He resigned with the team in 2024, appearing in 35 total games.

== International career ==
In 2015, Miribal represented Colombia at the 2015 South American Baseball Championship. After defeating host country Brazil in the championship, Colombia qualified for the 2015 Pan American Games.

In 2016, Mirabal was part of the Colombian team that finished third in the 2016 South American Baseball Championship.

In 2017, Colombia won the gold medal against Panama at the Bolivarian Games. Miribal also represented Colombia in the 2017 World Baseball Classic.
