= Clayton Tanner =

Australian baseball player

- Pitcher
- Born: 5 December 1987 (age 38); Mona Vale, New South Wales, Australia
- Bats: Right Throws: Left
- Stats at Baseball Reference

Clayton Edwin Tanner (born 5 December 1987) is an Australian former professional baseball pitcher.

== Career ==
Before he played professionally, Tanner attended De La Salle High School in Concord, California, United States. He was drafted in the third round of the 2006 amateur draft and began his professional career that season.

With the Salem-Keizer Volcanoes in 2006, Tanner went 2–2 with a 3.46 ERA in 13 relief appearances.

In 2007, he went 12–8 with a 3.59 ERA in 27 games (23 starts) for the Augusta Greenjackets.

He pitched for the San Jose Giants in 2008 and 2009, going 10–8 with a 3.69 ERA in the former year and 12–6 with a 3.17 ERA in the latter.

In 2010, he pitched for the Richmond Flying Squirrels, going 9–9 with a 3.68 ERA in 27 starts.

He was drafted by the San Francisco Giants in the 3rd round of the 2006 MLB draft and remained in their system through 2011 when he was released and signed as a minor league free agent with the Cincinnati Reds.

Tanner returned to the Giants on a minor league contract in 2012 and played in AAA for the Fresno Grizzlies.

He played for the Australian national baseball team in the 2013 World Baseball Classic.

On 14 March 2013, he signed a minor league contract with the Baltimore Orioles but was released soon after.

He played in the independent leagues in 2014, 2015 and 2016, most recently with the Pittsburg Mettle.
