= Trent Oeltjen =

Australian baseball player (born 1983)

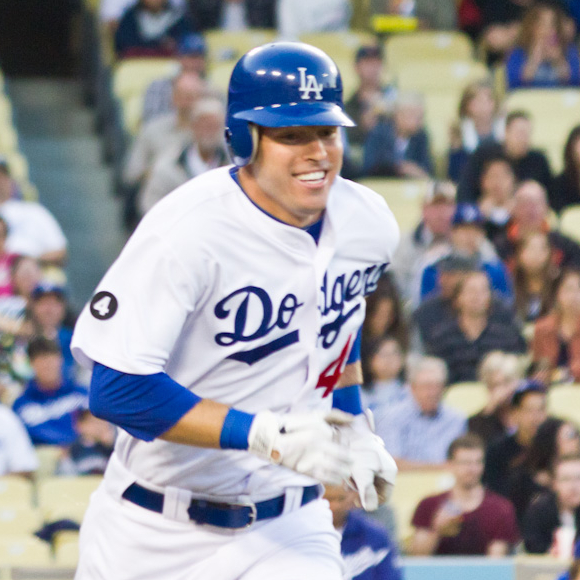
- Oeltjen with the Los Angeles Dodgers
- Outfielder
- Born: 28 February 1983 (age 43); Sydney, New South Wales, Australia
- Batted: Left Threw: Left

MLB debut
- 6 August, 2009, for the Arizona Diamondbacks

Last MLB appearance
- 28 September, 2011, for the Los Angeles Dodgers

MLB statistics
- Batting average: .220
- Home runs: 5
- Runs batted in: 11
- Stolen bases: 9
- Stats at Baseball Reference

Teams
- Arizona Diamondbacks (2009); Los Angeles Dodgers (2010–2011)
Medals
Men's baseball
Representing Australia
Olympics
| Silver medal – second place | 2004 Athens | National team |
Haarlem Baseball Week
| Bronze medal – third place | 2016 Haarlem | National team |

Trent Carl Wayne Oeltjen (/ˈtrɛnt ˈʌltʃɛn/; born 28 February 1983) is an Australian former professional baseball outfielder. He played in Major League Baseball (MLB) for the Arizona Diamondbacks and Los Angeles Dodgers. He is 6 ft 1 in (185 cm) tall and weighs 190 pounds (86 kg). In 2004, he was part of the Australian national baseball team that won a silver medal in the baseball tournament at the Athens Olympics.

== Professional career ==
=== Minnesota Twins ===
Oeltjen was signed by the Minnesota Twins in 2001. He hit at a .321/.387/.418 clip in his debut year for the Gulf Coast League Twins and was quickly promoted to the rookie-level Elizabethton Twins before the end of the season. The following year, Trent continued to excel and was promoted to the Single-A Quad City River Bandits. He continued to improve and by the end of 2003 he was batting just under .300 in 123 games for Quad City and was promoted to the Fort Myers Miracle for the 2004 season where he missed games to play for the Australia national baseball team in the 2004 Athens Olympics. Oeltjen would go on to represent Australia at the 2005 Baseball World Cup and 2006 World Baseball Classic.

Trent was impressing critics as he continued to rise through the ranks, batting at .300 with the Double-A affiliate New Britain Rock Cats in 2006 and was picked for the World team in the 2006 All-Star Futures Game. Following this success, he was promoted to Triple-A in 2007 for the Rochester Red Wings and although struggling in the regular season, he was perhaps the most outstanding individual player in the 2007 Baseball World Cup where he hit at a 523/.580/.614 clip to lead averages, steals (7) and runs (9) and was picked in the Cup All-Star team.

=== Arizona Diamondbacks ===
In 2008, he signed as a free agent with the Arizona Diamondbacks. He hit .317/.357/.466 for the Tucson Sidewinders. His consistent performances continued when Oeltjen was with Australia for the 2009 World Baseball Classic and batted 6 for 12 in the tournament. In the 2009 season he was batting over .300 and slugging .505 for the Reno Aces. He was called up to the majors on 6 August 2009, when Justin Upton was injured.

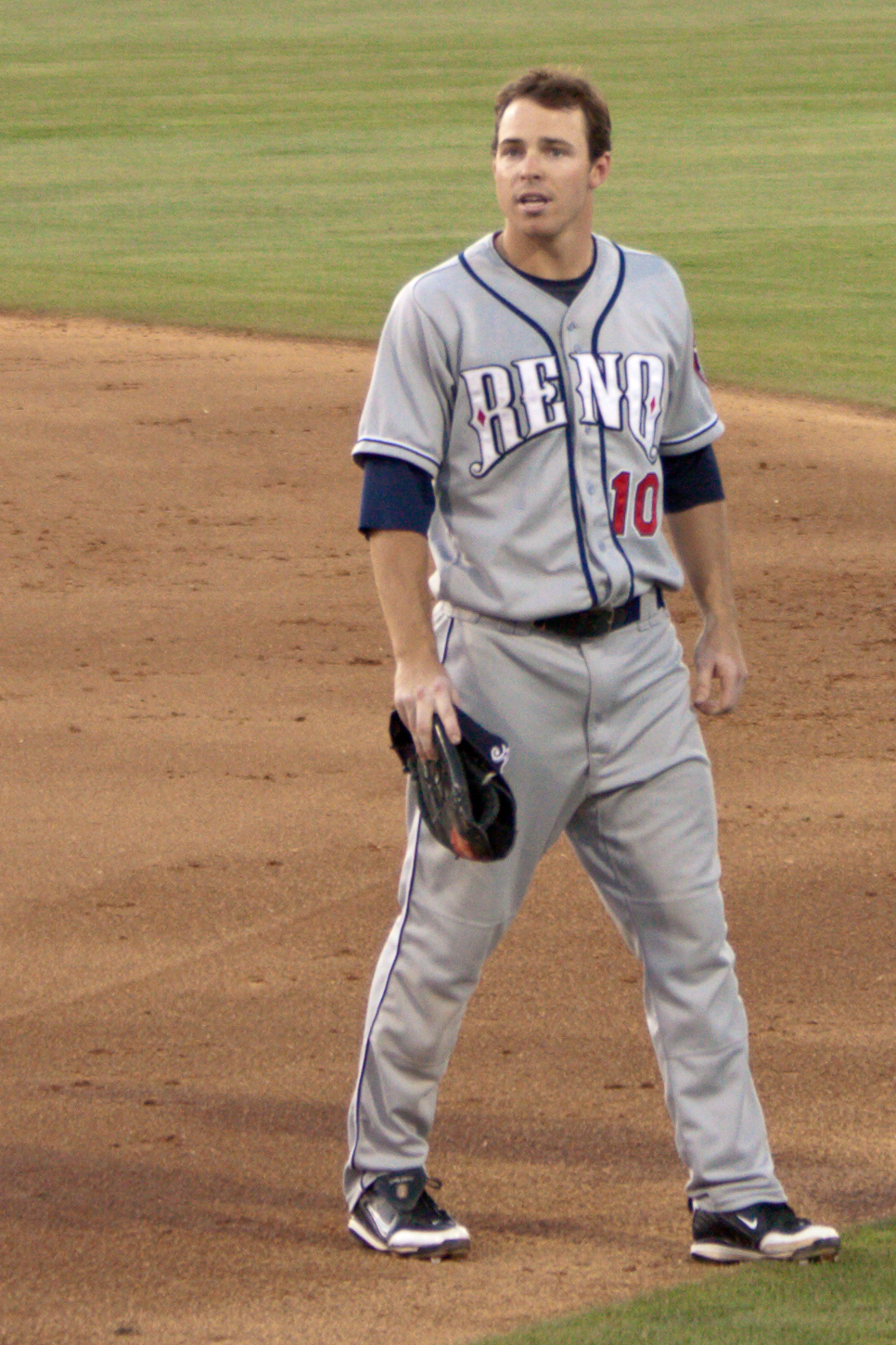
Oeltjen during his tenure with the Reno Aces, Triple-A affiliates of the Arizona Diamondbacks, in 2009

On 6 August 2009, Oeltjen recorded his first major league hit against Pittsburgh Pirates' pitcher Kevin Hart. Oeltjen then proceeded to steal his first major league base. He then hit his first major league home run off Pittsburgh Pirates' pitcher Jesse Chavez in the top of the 8th inning, a blast over the right field wall. Oeltjen finished the game 2 for 6 with an RBI and two stolen bases.

In his third game, he hit a lead-off home run against the Washington Nationals, as well as one against the New York Mets in his fourth game. Oeltjen hit his three home runs in his first 20 at bats. He also came one hit shy of the cycle in a four hit game on 11 August. The four hits meant that he became the fifth player in the "expansion era" since 1961 to have twelve hits in the first five major league games played.

On 29 August Oeltjen was optioned back to Reno for Chris Young as he had only 5 hits in his last 55 at-bats. He was recalled only 10 days later, and on 10 September as a pinch runner, was the winning run against the Los Angeles Dodgers in a base-on-balls walk-off.

=== Milwaukee Brewers ===
Oeltjen signed a minor league contract which included an invitation to spring training with the Milwaukee Brewers on 4 December 2009. In 70 games for the Triple-A Nashville Sounds, Oeltjen slashed .301/.355/.496 with eight home runs, 38 RBI, and 13 stolen bases. On 1 July 2010, he exercised an out clause in his contract and was granted his release from the Brewers.

=== Los Angeles Dodgers ===
On 6 July 2010, Oeltjen signed with the Los Angeles Dodgers and was assigned to Triple-A Albuquerque Isotopes. He hit .347 in 49 games for the Isotopes. Oeltjen was called up to the Dodgers on 7 September. He appeared in 14 games with the Dodgers, getting 5 hits in 23 at-bats for a .217 average. On 3 December, he was non-tendered, making him a free agent. He was re-signed by the Dodgers to a minor league contract on 7 December. He was named on the roster for the Australian Baseball League franchise Sydney Blue Sox in the offseason However, he never played during the Australian summer and was assigned to Triple-A Albuquerque for 2011. With the Isotopes, Oeltjen was hitting .339 with eight home runs and 34 RBI in 56 games. He was called back up to the Dodgers on 9 June and remained with the club the rest of the season as a reserve outfielder. He hit .197 in 61 games with 2 home runs and stole 6 bases.

Oeltjen was designated for assignment by the Dodgers on 14 May 2012, but remained with the Isotopes, where he hit .294 in 112 games. On 6 October, Oeltjen elected free agency.

=== Los Angeles Angels of Anaheim ===
On November 15, 2012, Oeltjen signed a minor league contract with the Los Angeles Angels of Anaheim organization. He spent the 2013 campaign with the Triple-A Salt Lake Bees, hitting .255/.345/.484 with 14 home runs, 49 RBI, and 21 stolen bases across 99 appearances.

=== Arizona Diamondbacks (second stint) ===
On 31 March 2014, the Diamondbacks signed Oeltjen to a minor league contract. He briefly returned to the Reno Aces, the Diamondbacks' Triple-A affiliate, before being loaned to the Toros de Tijuana of the Mexican Baseball League. Oeltjen appeared in 10 games for the Toros before being returned to the Aces, where he played in 13 games before being released on 19 May.

In January 2015, while playing in Australia for the Sydney Blue Sox, he announced his retirement from professional baseball.

=== Pittsburg Diamonds ===
During the summer of 2016, Oeltjen briefly joined the Pittsburg Diamonds of the Pacific Association, an independent baseball league. Oeltjen appeared in only two games, going 3-for-7 (.429) with a home run.

== Australian Baseball League ==
Leading up to the inaugural season of the new ABL in 2010/11, Oeltjen was named to the Sydney Blue Sox roster and saw action in two games for the Blue Sox that year. After spending 2011 and 2012 with the Dodgers, he returned for the 2013/14 and 2014/15 ABL seasons with the Blue Sox, seeing positive returns and his role expanded each year.

Oeltjen would not return for the 2015/16 season, but signed with the defending champion Brisbane Bandits for the 2016/17 season. Oeltjen contributed a key two-run double in the Preliminary final series against the Adelaide Bite. The Bandits would go on to defend their title, defeating the Melbourne Aces in two games.

== International career ==
In February 2016, Oeltjen played right field for the Australia national baseball team in the 2017 World Baseball Classic – Qualifier 1. Australia defeated the Philippines and South Africa twice to advance in the tournament. He appeared in all three games, going 5-for-9 with two walks, three runs, and four RBI.

In July 2016, Oeltjen played for Australia during the 2016 Haarlem Baseball Week, splitting time between right field and DH. Over seven games, Oeltjen went 8-for-28 (.286) with a solo home run off of the Netherlands' Jim Ploeger. Oeltjen was named Most Popular Player in the tournament. Australia placed third overall.

Oeltjen returned to the World Baseball Classic in 2017 to compete with Australia. Australia was eliminated in the first round, losing to both Japan and Cuba. Oeltjen appeared in two games, both times as the designated hitter, going 1-for-7, with three strikeouts and a walk. His lone hit was a solo home run off of Cuba's Vladimir García.

== Personal ==
Oeltjen completed his schooling at Gilroy College, Castle Hill and graduated in 2000. He and pitcher Ryan Rowland-Smith co-founded NxtGen Baseball, a training camp for young baseball players.
