= D. J. Sharabi =

American-Israeli baseball player (born 1992)

Free agent
- Pitcher
- Born: די ג'יי שרעבי; March 7, 1992 (age 34); San Mateo, California, U.S.
- Bats: Right Throws: Right
Medals
Men's baseball
Representing Israel
European Baseball Championship
Silver medal – second place	2021 Turin	Team

David Jonathan Sharabi (Hebrew: די ג'יי שרעבי; born March 7, 1992) is an American-Israeli professional baseball pitcher who is a free agent. He pitched 4 1/3 scoreless innings for Team Israel at the 2020 Summer Olympics in Tokyo in the summer of 2021.

== Career ==
Sharabi graduated from Burlingame High School in Burlingame, California, in 2010. He pitched for the school's baseball team through his senior year, despite having a torn ligament in his throwing elbow. He enrolled at College of San Mateo and had the ligament surgically repaired. He transferred to San Jose State University to continue his college baseball career with the San Jose State Spartans.

=== Great Bend Boom ===
Sharabi made his professional debut on May 19, 2016 with the Great Bend Boom of the Pecos League. Sharabi posted a 5-3 record and 4.60 ERA in 10 appearances for the Boom.

=== Sonoma Stompers ===
In 2017, Sharabi joined the Sonoma Stompers of the Pacific Association, and tossed 39.1 innings of 2.29 ERA ball in 29 games for the team, with 41 strikeouts (11.2 strikeouts/9 innings).

In 2018, Sharabi worked to a 2.45 ERA with 51 strikeouts in 47.2 innings of work across 36 games, and placed 5th in Reliever of the Year voting. In 2019, Sharabi appeared in 5 games for Sonoma, posting a 1.50 ERA with 10 strikeouts in 6 innings.

=== Cleburne Railroaders ===
On June 11, 2019, Sharabi's contract was purchased by the Cleburne Railroaders of the American Association of Professional Baseball. Sharabi finished out the year with a 4.17 ERA in 30 appearances for Cleburne. On February 18, 2020, Sharabi was released by the Railroaders.

=== Sioux Falls Canaries ===
On June 25, 2020, Sharabi signed with the Sioux Falls Canaries of the American Association of Professional Baseball. Sharabi appeared in 28 games for Sioux Falls in 2020, pitching to a 4.80 ERA with 32 strikeouts in 30.0 innings of work.

Sharabi began the 2021 season with the Canaries before joining the Israeli baseball team in the Olympics. Sharabi returned to the team following the Olympics and ended the year with a 3.48 ERA in 21 appearances, with 27 strikeouts in 20.2 innings (11.8 strikeouts/9 innings).

=== Ibaraki Astro Planets ===
On May 13, 2022, Sharabi signed with the Ibaraki Astro Planets of the Japanese independent Baseball Challenge League.

=== Milwaukee Milkmen ===
On July 14, 2022, Sharabi signed with the Milwaukee Milkmen of the American Association of Professional Baseball. He pitched in 10 games for Milwaukee, struggling to an 0-1 record and 6.00 ERA with 5 strikeouts in 9.0 innings pitched.

=== Sioux Falls Canaries (second stint) ===
On February 23, 2023, Sharabi was claimed off waivers by the Sioux Falls Canaries. In 4 games (3 starts) for Sioux Falls, Sharabi posted a 6.35 ERA with 8 strikeouts in 12.0 innings of work. He was released by the Canaries on June 23.

=== Tigres de Quintana Roo ===
On June 24, 2024, Sharabi signed with the Tigres de Quintana Roo of the Mexican League. In 5 games for Quintana Roo, he struggled to a 15.43 ERA with 2 strikeouts over 7 innings pitched. On December 3, Sharabi was released by Tigres.

== Team Israel ==
Both of Sharabi's parents are Jewish, and his father is Israeli. He pitched 4.1 scoreless innings over three games for Team Israel at the 2020 Summer Olympics in Tokyo in the summer of 2021. He held opposing batters to a batting average of .133.

Sharabi pitched for Team Israel in the 2023 European Baseball Championship in September 2023 in the Czech Republic.
