= Stacy Piagno =

American baseball player

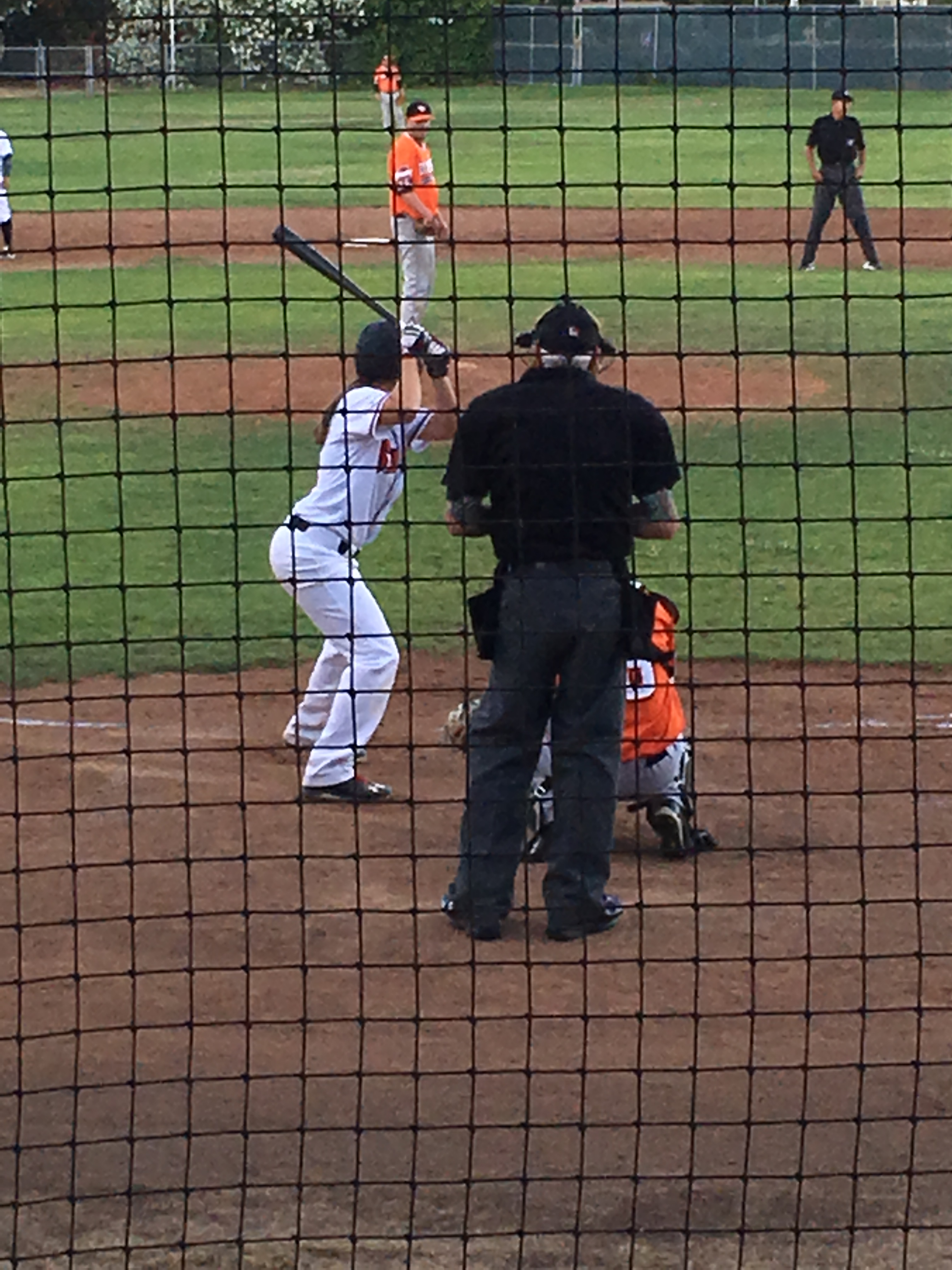
- Piagno at bat during a Sonoma Stompers baseball game in Sonoma, California

Personal information
- Nationality: American
- Born: March 7, 1991 (age 35)
- Education: University of Tampa

Sport
- Country: United States
- Sport: Baseball
Medal record
Women's baseball
Representing United States
Pan American Games
Gold medal – first place	2015 Toronto	Team competition
- Updated on July 14, 2016

Stacy Piagno (born March 7, 1991) is a member of the United States women's national baseball team which won a gold medal at the 2015 Pan American Games.

== Playing career ==
Piagno played college softball at the University of Tampa. On July 23, 2015, Piagno threw the first no-hitter in women's baseball at the Pan American Games, in Toronto, defeating the Puerto Rico women's national baseball team. In June 2016, she was signed by the Sonoma Stompers of the Pacific Association of Professional Baseball Clubs. This made her and fellow Stompers teammate outfielder-pitcher Kelsie Whitmore the first women to play professional baseball as teammates since the 1950s.

=== Sonoma Stompers (2016–2017) ===
On July 1, 2016, Piagno made her professional debut against the San Rafael Pacifics.

On July 15, 2017, Piagno recorded a win against the Pittsburg Diamonds in her first start of the 2017 season. In doing so, she became the third woman since the 1950s to win a game in an American men's professional league. Piagno also had an 11 inning scoreless streak from July 15 until August 19. She ended the season with a 1–0 record and a 4.20 ERA
