= Fehlandt Lentini =

American baseball player (born 1977)

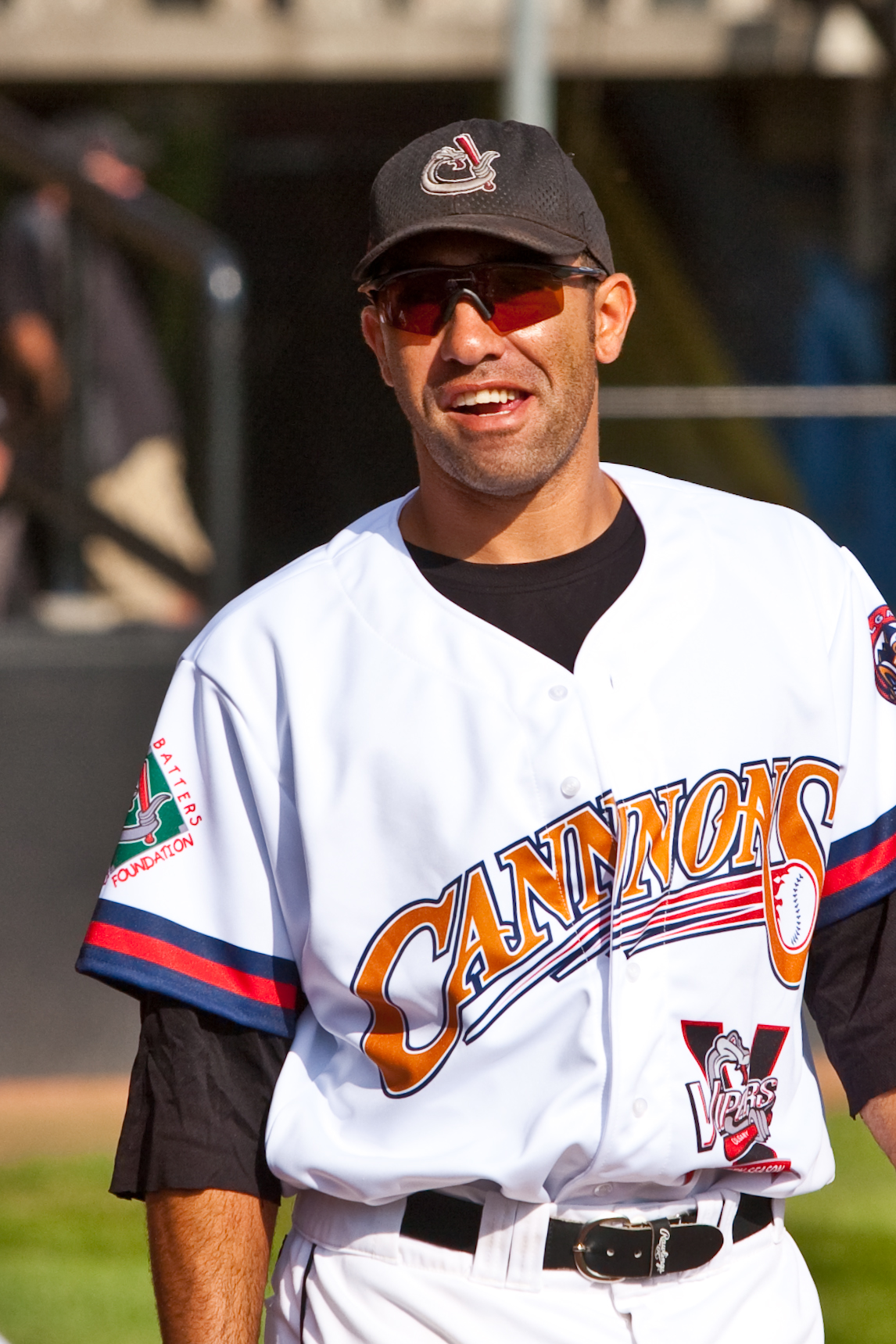
- Lentini with the Calgary Vipers in 2009
- Outfielder
- Born: August 12, 1977 (age 48); Santa Rosa, California, U.S.
- Bats: Right Throws: Right

Minor League Baseball statistics
- Batting average: .287
- Home runs: 6
- Runs batted in: 117

Independent league baseball statistics
- Batting average: .307
- Home runs: 124
- Runs batted in: 748
- Stats at Baseball Reference

Teams
- Minor leagues: Martinsville Astros (APPY, 2001); Pittsfield Astros (NYPL, 2001); Lexington Legends (SALL, 2001); Michigan Battle Cats (MIDW, 2002); Salem Avalanche (CARL, 2003); Round Rock Express (TL, 2003); Potros de Tijuana (MEX, 2008); Tecolotes de Nuevo Laredo (MEX, 2009); Independent leagues: Kalamazoo Kings (FRON, 2004); Calgary Vipers (NORL, 2005); Gary Southshore Railcats (NORL, 2005); Winnipeg Goldeyes (NORL, 2006–2008); Calgary Vipers (GBL, 2009); Na Koa Ikaika Maui (GBL, 2010); Amarillo Sox (AA, 2011); Winnipeg Goldeyes (AA, 2011); Lancaster Barnstormers (ATL, 2012); Winnipeg Goldeyes (AA, 2013); Long Island Ducks (ATL, 2014); Sonoma Stompers (PAC) (2015); Long Island Ducks (ATL, 2015–2017)

Career highlights and awards
- Frontier League All-Star (2004); 3x Northern League All-Star (2006–2008); Baseball America's All-Independent League Second Team (2006); Northern League single-season triples record (2006); Golden Baseball League All-Star (2009); Golden Baseball League champion (2009); Sonoma State Athletic Hall of Fame inductee

Fehlandt A. Lentini (born August 12, 1977, in Santa Rosa, California) is a former American professional baseball outfielder who last played for the Long Island Ducks. Lentini, an outfielder, has played with many different minor and independent league teams over his career, which began in 2001 with the Martinsville Astros of the rookie-level Appalachian League. He attended Sonoma State University and from there, was signed by the Houston Astros as an amateur free agent. In the Astros organization, he played with six different teams from 2001 to 2003. During the 2004 season, Lentini began his tenure in the independent league circuit, signing with the Kalamazoo Kings of the Frontier League. That season, was named a league all-star.

From 2006 to 2008, Lentini was selected to play in the Northern League All-Star Game as a member of the Winnipeg Goldeyes. After joining the Golden Baseball League in 2009, he was chosen to play in the season's all-star game. Also in 2009 Lentini, as a member of the Calgary Vipers, was named the Golden Baseball League's Player of the Week for June 1 to 7. The Vipers won the league championship that season. In October 2010, his alma mater, Sonoma State University, will induct him into the Sonoma State Athletic Hall of Fame.

Aside from his time as a player, Lentini is notable for his tenure as manager of the Sonoma Stompers, chronicled in the book The Only Rule Is It Has To Work.

== Amateur career ==
While attending Napa Valley College, Lentini was selected in the 41^{st} round of the 1996 Major League Baseball draft by the Texas Rangers, but did not sign. He was one of ten students of Napa Valley College to be selected in the history of the Major League Baseball draft. Lentini then transferred to Sonoma State University. During his first season at Sonoma State in 1998, Lentini batted .309 with 15 stolen bases. He did not attend the school in 1999 and 2000, returning for the 2001 season, compiling a .427 batting average with 117 hits, 23 doubles, 10 triples and 89 runs. All of those numbers stand as a single-season Sonoma State records. The Napa Valley Register described his 2001 campaign with Sonoma State as "perhaps the greatest single season in school history". Lentini was awarded first-team All-American honors in 2001, as well as being named West Region and California Collegiate Athletic Association Player of the Year. In 2010, it was announced that Lentini will be inducted into the Sonoma State Athletic Hall of Fame on October 2. The ceremony will take place in Rohnert Park and the school will also be honoring Ed Beaulac, Patricia Carrillo and Tim Walsh.

== Professional career ==
=== Houston Astros organization (2001–2003) ===
After completing his 2001 season with Sonoma State University, Lentini was signed by the Houston Astros as an amateur free agent. In 2001, he played at three different levels of the Astros minor league organization. First with the rookie-level Martinsville Astros of the Appalachian League, he batted .283 with eight runs scored, 13 hits, one double, one triple, one home run, four runs batted in (RBIs) and 11 stolen bases in 12 games played. Lentini was then promoted to the Pittsfield Astros, who were member of the Class A Short Season New York–Penn League. With Pittsfield, he batted .346 with 13 runs scored, 18 hits, three doubles, one triple, eight RBIs and eight stolen bases in 15 games played. His final team in 2001 was the Class-A Lexington Legends of the South Atlantic League. In 29 games with the Legends, Lentini batted .295 with 27 runs scored, 36 hits, 11 doubles, two triples, one home run, 21 RBIs and 10 stolen bases. Combined between the three clubs that season, Lentini batted .305 with 48 runs scored, 67 hits, 15 doubles, four triples, two home runs, 33 RBIs and 29 stolen bases in 56 games played. On defense, played all of his 54 games in the outfield, committing no errors, seven assists and 78 putouts.

Lentini spent the entire 2002 season with the Michigan Battle Cats of the Class-A Midwest League. On the season, he batted .289 with 41 runs scored, 71 hits, 12 doubles, three triples, one home run, 35 RBIs, 25 stolen bases and 29 walks in 71 games played. In the field, Lentini played all of his 64 games as an outfielder, committing four errors, eight assists and 93 putouts in 105. In 2003, he played with two different teams in the Astros organization. First, with the Class-A Advanced Salem Avalanche of the Carolina League, he batted .279 with 45 runs scored, 103 hits, 21 doubles, four triples, three home runs, 48 RBIs and 19 stolen bases in 100 games played. Lentini's second team that season were the Round Rock Express of the Double-A Texas League. With Round Rock, he batted .217 with four runs scored, five hits, one double, one triple and one RBI in 17 games played. Combined between the two teams, he batted .276 with 108 hits, 22 doubles, five triples, three home runs and 49 RBIs in 117 games played. On defense between the two clubs, Lentini played 78 games in the outfield, committing two errors, eight assists and 151 putouts. The 2003 season would be his last in affiliated minor league baseball.

=== Kalamazoo Kings (2004) ===
In 2004, at the age of 26, Lentini began his career in independent league baseball after he signed with the Kalamazoo Kings, who were members of the Frontier League. Lentini was selected to play on the 2004 Frontier League All-Star team. On the season, he batted .310 with 57 runs scored, 106 hits, 16 doubles, nine triples, seven home runs, 60 RBIs and 28 stolen bases in 90 games played. In the field, he played all of his 85 defensive games as an outfielder, committing three errors, 11 assists and 167 putouts. Amongst league batters that season, Lentini led in triples, was sixth in stolen bases and was tied for tenth in hits. He led the Kings in hits, triples, RBIs, stolen bases, total bases (161) and sacrifice flies (9). During the next season, he signed with the Sioux Falls team, but was released before the start of the season.

=== Calgary Vipers and Gary Southshore Railcats (2005) ===
Before the 2005 season, Lentini signed with the Calgary Vipers of the independent Northern League. With Calgary, he batted .342 with 59 runs scored, 96 hits, 20 doubles, six triples, six home runs 42 RBIs and 22 stolen bases in 67 games played. In August 2005, the Vipers traded Lentini to the Gary Southshore Railcats, also of the Northern League, in exchange for Quintin Oldenburg and Jason Colson. Slam! Sports described the trade as "perhaps the biggest trade of the 2005 Northern League season". On August 30, 2005, Lentini won the Northern League Player of the Week Award for the week of August 22 to August 28. During that week, Lentini batted .469 with three home runs and eight RBIs. With the Southshore Railcats that season, he batted .333 with 20 runs scored, 34 hits, seven doubles, two triples, four home runs, 15 RBIs and seven stolen bases in 23 games played. Combined between the two teams that season, Lentini batted .339 with 79 runs scored, 130 hits, 27 doubles, eight triples, 10 home runs, 57 RBIs and 29 stolen bases in 90 games played. On defense, he played all of his 89 combined games in the outfield, committing four errors, 10 assists and 227 putouts. As a member of the Railcats, Lentini was a second half co-league champion. Amongst league batters, Lentini was third in triples; fourth in stolen bases, runs scored and hits; tied for fourth in caught stealing (9); sixth in batting average; tied for sixth in total bases (203); and seventh in at-bats (383). Before the 2006 season, the Railcats re-signed Lentini.

=== Winnipeg Goldeyes (2006–2008) ===
Before the 2006 season, the Gary Southshore Railcats traded Lentini to the Winnipeg Goldeyes, also of the Northern League. Winnipeg manager Rick Forney was convinced to trade for Lentini by the team's bench coach Steve Maddock. He was selected for the 2006 Northern League All-Star Game. On the season, he batted .325 with 93 runs scored, 136 hits, 32 doubles, 13 triples, six home runs, 49 RBIs and 57 stolen bases in 96 games played. Lentini played all of his 96 games as an outfielder, committing six errors, five assists and 269 putouts. He led the league at-bats (418), triples and stolen bases; was second in plate appearances (452) runs scored, hits, doubles and total bases (212); and eighth in batting average. His 13 triples was a Northern League single-season record, breaking the previous record of 12 set by Justin Foust in 2005. He also holds the league record for the second most stolen bases in a single-season. After the season, Lentini was named to Baseball America's All-Independent League Second Team. In 2007, for the second straight season, Lentini was named to the Northern League All-Star Game. In May, he sprained his ankle while playing a pick-up basketball game with a teammate while the game they were playing was under a rain delay. During the season, he batted .321 with 86 runs scored, 130 hits, 36 doubles, seven triples, 10 home runs, 54 RBIs and 42 stolen bases in 92 games played. He led the league in at-bats (405) and stolen bases, was second in runs scored and triples, fourth in total bases (210), and sixth in hits.

Lentini started the 2008 season with the Potros de Tijuana of the Triple-A Mexican League. After just 10 games, he batted .268 with four runs scored, 11 hits, four doubles and five RBIs. Tijuana then released him. Scheduled to return to Winnipeg for the start of the Northern League season, Lentini was forced to stay in Mexico until Potros de Tijuana paid him his salary. He later returned to the Winnipeg Goldeyes in time for the start of the 2008 Northern League campaign. For the third straight season, Lentini was selected to play in the Northern League All-Star Game. With the Goldeyes that season, Lentini batted .298 with 71 runs scored, 125 hits, 27 doubles, eight triples, nine home runs, 39 RBIs and 37 stolen bases in 96 games played. Between the two clubs he played for in 2007, Lentini batted .295 with 75 runs scored, 136 hits, 31 doubles, eight triples, nine home runs, 44 RBIs and 38 stolen bases 106 games played. In the field between the two teams, he played all 106 games as an outfielder, committing 11 errors, four assists and 224 putouts. Lentini led the league that season in at-bats (451), triples and stolen bases; was second in plate appearances (451) and hits; third in runs scored; and tied for seventh in doubles.

=== Calgary Vipers, second tenure (2009) ===
Lentini began the 2009 season with the Tecolotes de Nuevo Laredo of the Triple-A Mexican League. In 22 games Nuevo Laredo, he batted .266 with 14 runs scored, 25 hits, six doubles, two triples, two home runs, 11 RBIs and four stolen bases. On May 17, 2009, the Lentini signed with the Calgary Vipers, who he had played with in 2005. This time, the Vipers were members of the Golden Baseball League. On June 11, it was announced that Lentini was the Golden Baseball League's Player of the Week for the week of June 1 to June 7 after batting .545 in five games. He was selected to the Golden Baseball League's All-Star Game that season. As a member of the North team, Lentini beat Jim Rushford of the South in the league's home run derby. Lentini was the leadoff hitter in the all-star game. During his first at-bat of that game, he hit a home run off of South pitcher José Lima. On the season with the Vipers, Lentini batted .366 with 98 runs scored, 122 hits, 33 doubles, three triples, 11 home runs, 57 RBIs and 33 stolen bases in 74 games played. The Vipers won the Golden Baseball League championship that season.

=== Na Koa Ikaika Maui (2010) ===
On February 24, 2010, Lentini signed with the Na Koa Ikaika Maui, who like his last team were members of the Golden Baseball League. On his 33^{rd} birthday, Lentini hit his tenth home run of the season. On the season, he batted .299 with 70 runs scored, 86 hits, 24 doubles, four triples, 13 home runs, 30 RBIs and 28 walks in 74 games played. Lentini also pitched a game, giving-up two hits and no runs in one inning pitched. During the Golden Baseball League playoffs, he batted .303 with 10 runs scored, 10 hits, four doubles, one triple and two RBIs in eight games played.

=== Amarillo Sox and Winnipeg Goldeyes (2011) ===
Lentini signed with the Amarillo Sox of the American Association for the 2011 season. Over 71 games for the Sox, Lentini hit .324 with four home runs, seven triples and 30 doubles while driving in 56 runs. Lentini finished the season with the Winnipeg Goldeyes after signing with them in early August.

=== Lancaster Barnstomers (2012) ===
In 2012, Lentini made his Atlantic League for the Lancaster Barnstormers. Lentini would log 136 games played with Barnstormers, where he placed among many of the Atlantic League league leaders. The Santa Rosa native led the Atlantic League in runs scored (98), at bats (539) and plate appearances (583). Lentini placed second in runs batted (92), third in doubles (36)and stolen bases (32). He also placed fifth in batting with a .319 average. With the Barnstormers, he also hit a career high 19 home runs. Lentini was also named 2012 Atlantic League All-Star game Most Valuable player after going two-for-three with a walk and scoring the winning run when the Freedom Division rallied for six runs in the ninth inning to beat the Liberty Division 9–5.

=== Winnipeg Goldeyes (2013) ===
Lentini would return to the Goldeyes in 2013 where he would play 97 games holding a .271 average while hitting seven home runs, 26 doubles and driving in 45 runs.

=== Long Island Ducks (2014) ===
In 2014, Lentini would make his Long Island Ducks debut where he would lead the Atlantic League in plate appearances (649) and at bats (593). The 36-year-old would place second in hits (172) and (46)stolen bases with a perfect 46-for-46 ratio. He also placed third in games played (137), runs scored (96) and fourth in doubles with (36).

=== Sonoma Stompers (2015) ===
On February 15, Lentini was named player manager of the Sonoma Stompers of the Pacific Association. After winning the first half of the season, Lentini was let go. Lentini logged 32 games played with the Stompers and a .289 average while driving in 27 runs and scoring 26 of his own.

=== Return to Long Island Ducks (2015-2017) ===
In late July, Lentini signed with the Ducks for the remainder of the 2015 season. In 48 games played, Lentini batted .291 with 21 rbis in 213 at bats.

In 2016, Lentini led the Atlantic League with (630) plate appearances, (571) at bats, (179) hits, runs (108), (42) doubles and tied for first with (140) games played. He'd also place top five in total bases (260), runs batted in (85), stolen bases (51), hit by pitches (10) and triples (6). On July 13, Lentini would play for the Liberty Division for the 2016 ALPB All-Star game, and nearly winning the league’s MVP award

In the 2017 season, Lentini was inserted as the starting right fielder and remained so for the first half of the season but was unable to repeat last years success and struggled batting .234 with three home runs and 15 runs batted in with 28 steals in 69 games played before being benched for younger players. Accustomed to starting and playing everyday, Lentini immediately demanded a trade or release in order find a starting job elsewhere. The Ducks refused and instead placed him on the teams inactive list. Lentini then went to the ballpark before the Ducks next home game and handed out fliers to fans asking them to demand his release. This resulted in his immediate suspension from the Ducks and the Atlantic League. He has not played professionally in any league since.

=== Foreign Leagues ===
Lentini spent five seasons playing in the Mexican League, Puerto Rican Winter League and Venezuelan Winter League. Over 107 games in the combined three leagues, Lentini batted .279 with 51 runs batted in, 59 runs scored, 26 doubles, 10 triples, four home runs and 16 stolen bases.

=== Career milestones ===
Over 17 professional seasons, Lentini had 2,111 hits, 486 doubles, 97 triples, 134 home runs and 916 runs batted in. In 1,713 career games played, Lentini held a .303 average and had 576 stolen bases with a career stolen base percentage of 84.2%.

=== Coaching ===
From 2018 to 2021, Lentini was the hitting and bench coach for the Medicine Hat Mavericks of the Western Canadian Baseball League.

== Personal life ==
Lentini was born on August 12, 1977, in Santa Rosa, California. He has stated that he enjoys hiking and mountain biking. Lentini has his own rap album.
