= Sonoma Stompers =

California collegiate summer baseball team

Logo
Cap insignia

Information
- League: California Collegiate League
- Location: Sonoma, California
- Ballpark: Arnold Field
- Founded: 2014
- League championships: PAPBC: 2016
- Former league: Pacific Association
- Colors: Navy, orange, white
- Retired numbers: Jayce Ray (99)
- Ownership: Jon Sebastiani
- General manager: Chase Anderson
- Manager: Zack Pace
- Website: stompersbaseball.com

The Sonoma Stompers are a collegiate summer baseball team based in Sonoma, California. They are current members of the California Collegiate League. They began play as members of the Pacific Association of Professional Baseball Clubs in 2014. They are a successor franchise to the defunct Sonoma County Grapes, and were the first professional team to make Sonoma County home since the Sonoma County Crushers ceased play following the 2002 season.

== History ==
=== 2014–2019: Pacific Association ===
==== 2014: Inaugural Season ====
The Stompers announced their first professional signing, Tommy Lyons, in March 2014, and shortly thereafter traded for local player, Jayce Ray. The team's first manager was Ray Serrano, who led the Stompers to a 42–36 record in their inaugural season. In 2015, Serrano accepted a full-time position with the Atlanta Braves to serve as the organization's catching instructor. Former major league pitcher Bill "Spaceman" Lee started a game for the Stompers on August 12, 2014, pitching the team to victory over the Pittsburg Mettle. Lee set a record with the win, becoming the oldest person (at age 67) to ever win a professional baseball game. Lee pitched 5 2/3 innings, and batted for himself. Ray was named the leagues Most Valuable Player and later signed with the Boston Red Sox.

==== 2015: "The Only Rule Is It Has to Work" ====
In 2015, the Sonoma Stompers allowed Ben Lindbergh and Sam Miller of Baseball Prospectus's Effectively Wild podcast to serve as the Baseball Operations department, under general manager Theo Fightmaster. The duo wrote about their experience in a book entitled The Only Rule Is It Has to Work, published in 2016.

On February 15, Fehlandt Lentini was named player manager. After winning the first half of the season, Lentini was let go. He was replaced by Takashi Miyoshi. The team made history in June 2015, when pitcher Sean Conroy became the first openly gay active professional baseball player. The Stompers finished the season 44–33 after falling to San Rafael in the championship game.

==== 2016–2017: First coed professional baseball team since 1950s and Championship ====
In June 2016, the Stompers announced that two female baseball players would join their roster starting in July. Upon joining the team, the two players, outfielder-pitcher Kelsie Whitmore and infielder Stacy Piagno, made the Sonoma Stompers the first coed professional baseball team since the 1950s. The Stompers added catcher Anna Kimbrell in July 2016. The Stompers won both the first and second halves of the season, earning their first Pacific Association championship under Miyoshi. In 2017, Sonoma clinched a championship game berth after winning the first half of the season, but fell to Vallejo in the finale. After the 2017 season, the Minnesota Twins hired Miyoshi as a coach for Elizabethton Twins.

==== 2018–2019: Back to back regular season titles ====
In 2018, under new general manager Brett Creamer and manager Zack Pace, the Sonoma Stompers set a Pacific Association record by finishing 57–23. Several players earned league honors during the season. Outfielder Kenny Meimerstorf won the league's Rookie of the Year Award after setting franchise single-season records with 23 home runs and 74 RBIs in 78 games. Former Arizona Diamondbacks prospect Daniel Comstock batted a franchise-record .362 and was named Defensive Player of the Year at catcher. On the mound, Jacob Cox established a Pacific Association single-season record with 26 saves, surpassing the previous mark of 18 set by Sammy Gervacio with the Vallejo Admirals in 2017. Vijay Patel also set a franchise single-season record with nine wins, finishing 9–3 while striking out 92 batters in 84 innings.

The Stompers again finished atop the league in 2019 with a 45–19 regular-season record. During the season, pitcher Cole Watts and outfielder Dondrei Hubbard signed with affiliates of the Kansas City Royals and the San Diego Padres, respectively, becoming the sixth and seventh players in franchise history to sign with affiliated organizations. Pitcher Henry Omana was promoted to Bravos de León of the Mexican League after posting a 3–1 record, 1.33 ERA, and 36 strikeouts over 27 innings in five starts.

=== 2021–present: California Collegiate League ===
In 2021, one year after the Pacific Association's season was cancelled due to the COVID-19 pandemic, the Stompers left the professional ranks and joined the California Collegiate League.

On May 17, 2022, former 2017 pitcher Logan Gillaspie made his Major League Baseball debut against the New York Yankees where he recorded his first career strikeout against Kyle Higashioka in two scoreless innings pitched. Gillaspie became the first Stompers player to appear in a Major League game and second Pacific Association player with Chris Mazza being the first in 2019.

On August 2, 2023, the New York Yankees signed former 2022 Stompers outfielder Jackson Castillo as an undrafted free agent. Castillo became the first player to sign with an affiliated team since Sonoma left the professional ranks.

On September 8, former 2018 play-by-play announcer Nicholas Badders made his Major League debut on the Kansas City Royals Radio Network alongside Steve Stewart.

== Professional season-by-season results ==
Sonoma Stompers (Pacific Association)
Season	Overall	Win %	Standing	Manager	Postseason
2014	42–36	.538	T-2nd in Division (first half); 3rd in Division (second half)	Ray Serrano	Did not qualify
2015	44–33†	.571	1st in Division (first half); 3rd in Division (second half)	Fehlandt Lentini (21–11); Takashi Miyoshi (23–22) (Note: Miyoshi was named Interim Manager 7/12/15, but was credited wins on 7/10/15 and 7/11/15 in Lentini's absence.)	Lost championship game (SRF)
2016	47–31	.603	1st in Division (first half); 1st in Division (second half)	Takashi Miyoshi	First half winner; Second half winner; League Champions
2017	52–26	.667	1st in Division (first half); 2nd in Division (second half)	Takashi Miyoshi	Lost championship game (VAL)
2018	57–23	.713	1st	Zack Pace	Won Semifinals (PIT); Lost championship game (SRF)
2019	45–19	.703	1st	Zack Pace	Lost championship series (SRF) 1–2
Totals	287–168	.631	—	—	2–5 (.286)

† 2015 post-season was also included in regular season record.

== Collegiate season-by-season results ==
Sonoma Stompers (California Collegiate League)
Season	League	Division	Overall	Win %	Conference	Win %	Finish	Manager	Playoffs
2022	CCL	North	17–30	.362	11–23	.324	5th	Zack Pace	Did not qualify
2023	CCL	North	25–22	.532	16–19	.457	4th	Zack Pace	Did not qualify
2024	CCL	North	30–17	.638	21–15	.583	3rd	Zack Pace	Won Wild card (San Luis Obispo); Lost North Division finals (Walnut Creek)
2025	CCL	North	31–17	.646	25–15	.625	1st	Zack Pace	Won North Division finals (Walnut Creek); Lost CCL finals (Conejo) 0–2
2026	CCL	North	29–19	.604	25–18	.581	3rd	Zack Pace	Won Wild card (San Luis Obispo); Lost North Division finals (Walnut Creek)
Totals			132–105	.557	98–90	.521	—	—	3–4 (.429)

== National team ==
D. J. Sharabi
Former three year reliever who participated at the 2020 Summer Olympics in Tokyo for Team Israel. Sharabi also pitched for Team Israel in the 2023 European Baseball Championship in September 2023 in the Czech Republic.
Chris Kwitzer
2019 Gilded Glove winner at the third base position. Played for Spain in the 2023 World Baseball Classic qualification.
Daniel Molinari
Former catcher who played for Brazil in the 2019 Pan American Games Qualifier and 2023 World Baseball Classic qualification.

== Notable alumni ==
- Bill Lee (2014)
- Charlie Mirabal (2014)
- Jose Canseco (2015)
- Fehlandt Lentini (2015)
- Sean Conroy (2015–2016)
- Anna Kimbrell (2016)
- Kelsie Whitmore (2016–2017)
- Stacy Piagno (2016–2017)
- Logan Gillaspie (2017)
- D.J. Sharabi (2017–2019)
- Chris Kwitzer (2019)
- Henry Omana (2019)
