= Logan Gillaspie =

American baseball player (born 1997)

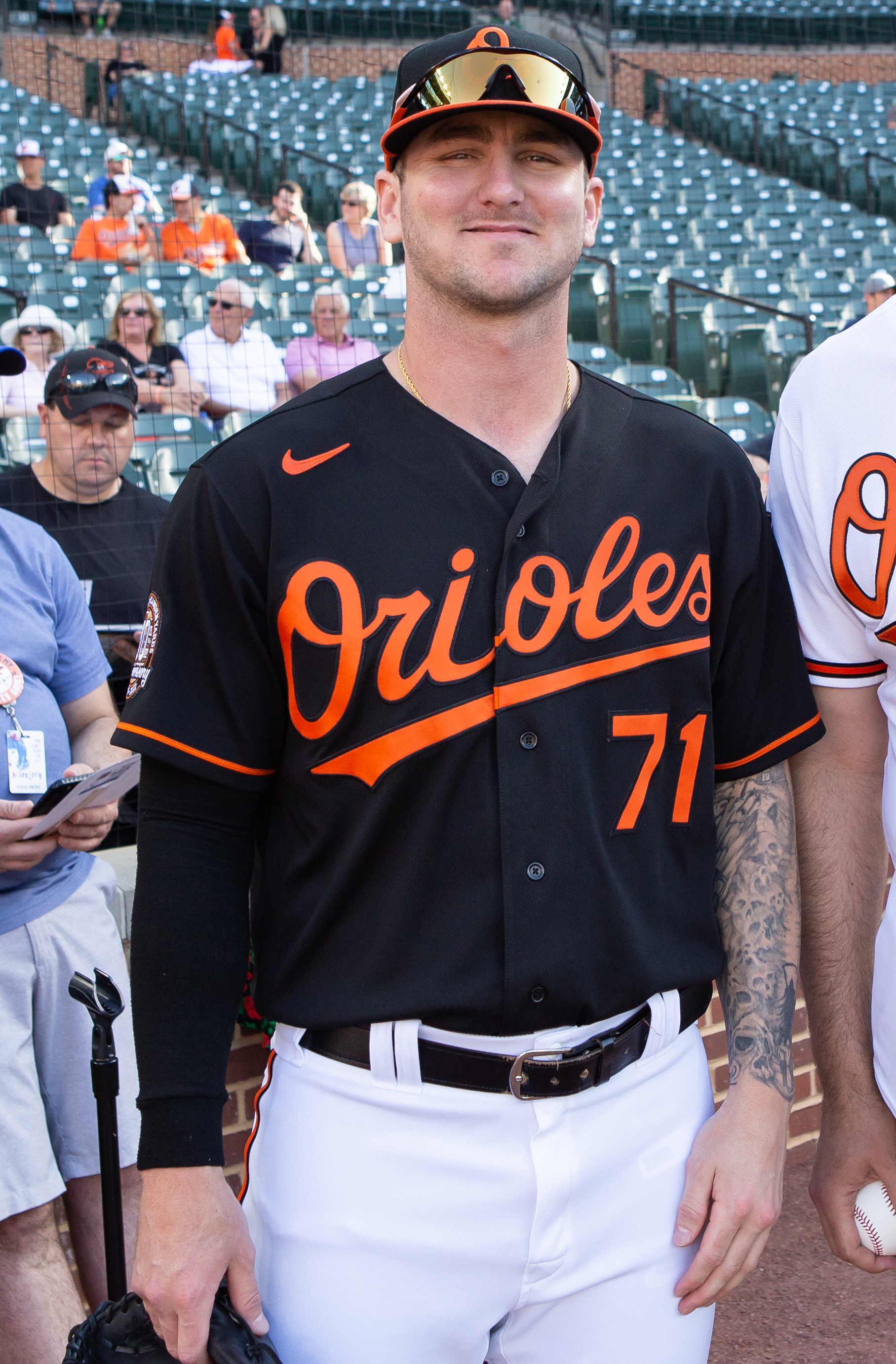
- Gillaspie with the Baltimore Orioles in 2022

Free agent
- Pitcher
- Born: April 17, 1997 (age 29); Bakersfield, California, U.S.
- Bats: Right Throws: Right

MLB debut
- May 17, 2022, for the Baltimore Orioles

MLB statistics (through 2025 season)
- Win–loss record: 1–1
- Earned run average: 4.63
- Strikeouts: 29
- Stats at Baseball Reference

Teams
- Baltimore Orioles (2022–2023); San Diego Padres (2024–2025)

Logan Craig Gillaspie (born April 17, 1997) is an American professional baseball pitcher who is a free agent. He has previously played in Major League Baseball (MLB) for the Baltimore Orioles and San Diego Padres.

== Amateur career ==
Gillaspie attended Frontier High School in Bakersfield, California, from 2011 to 2015. He was selected to play for the Oakland Athletics in the 2014 Area Code Games. He attended Oxnard College from 2015 to 2017, where he played college baseball, playing as a pitcher, catcher, and third baseman.

== Professional career ==
=== Independent leagues ===
Gillaspie was not drafted out of Oxnard College in 2017 and joined the Monterey Amberjacks in the Pecos League. From there, he moved up to the Salina Stockade in the American Association. After being released, he signed with the Sonoma Stompers in the Pacific Association. In January 2018, Gillaspie played in the California Winter League, then signed with the United Shore Professional Baseball League to play for the Eastside Diamond Hoppers.

=== Milwaukee Brewers ===
On July 13, 2018, the Milwaukee Brewers signed Gillaspie to a minor league contract. Gillaspie played with the rookie-level Arizona League Brewers and the rookie-level Helena Brewers of the Pioneer League with whom he posted a 3.26 earned run average (ERA) over 19 1/3 innings pitched.

Gillaspie spent the 2019 season with the Wisconsin Timber Rattlers of the Single-A Midwest League, posting a 3–7 win–loss record with a 3.96 ERA over 31 games (16 starts), striking out 92 batters over 109 innings. Gillaspie was named a Midwest League all-star with the Timber Rattlers. On September 11, 2019, Gillaspie was released by the Brewers organization.

=== Baltimore Orioles ===
On June 9, 2021, Gillaspie signed a minor league contract with the Baltimore Orioles organization. He split the year between the Aberdeen IronBirds of the High-A East and the Bowie Baysox of the Double-A Northeast, going 1–3 with a 4.97 ERA over 26 relief appearances, striking out 52 batters over 41 2/3 innings. He was selected to play in the Arizona Fall League for the Mesa Solar Sox after the season.

On November 19, 2021, the Orioles selected Gillaspie's contract and added him to their 40-man roster to protect him from the Rule 5 draft. He returned to Bowie to open the 2022 season. After six appearances with Bowie in 2022, he was promoted to the Norfolk Tides of the Triple-A International League. On May 17, 2022, the Orioles promoted Gillaspie to the major leagues for the first time. He made his MLB debut that night versus the New York Yankees at Oriole Park at Camden Yards, throwing two scoreless innings in relief. On October 2, Gillaspie threw a scoreless 6th inning against the New York Yankees at Yankee Stadium to record his first major-league victory in a 3–1 Orioles win. Gillaspie finished the season with a 1–0 record with a 3.12 ERA in 17 1/3 innings pitched in 17 appearances.

In 2023, Gillaspie made 11 appearances for Baltimore, but struggled to a 6.00 ERA with eight strikeouts in nine innings of work. On September 2, 2023, he was designated for assignment following the Orioles' waiver claim of Jorge López.

=== Boston Red Sox ===
On September 4, 2023, Gillaspie was claimed off waivers by the Boston Red Sox. He was optioned to Boston's Triple-A affiliate, the Worcester Red Sox, where he spent the remainder of the year. In four appearances for Worcester, Gillaspie did not allow a run, striking out four and recording one save in 4 1/3 innings.

=== San Diego Padres ===
On November 15, 2023, Gillaspie was claimed off waivers by the San Diego Padres. He was optioned to the Triple-A El Paso Chihuahuas to begin the 2024 season. On April 17, 2024, Gillaspie's contract was selected by the Padres. Two days later, Gillaspie came on in relief in the 9th inning against the Toronto Blue Jays. With a runner on third base and one out, he struck out both Bo Bichette and Vladimir Guerrero Jr to seal a 5–1 win. In 9 games for San Diego, he posted a 7.15 ERA with 7 strikeouts over 11 1/3 innings pitched. On November 22, the Padres non-tendered Gillaspie, making him a free agent.

On December 12, 2024, Gillaspie re-signed with the Padres on a minor league contract. After two appearances for El Paso, the Padres added Gillaspie to their active roster on April 6, 2025. He recorded a 2.57 ERA with four strikeouts in three games before being placed on the injured list with a left oblique strain on April 27. On June 30, Gillaspie was activated from the injured list and subsequently designated for assignment. He cleared waivers and was sent outright to El Paso on July 2.

In 2026, he played in 47 games (1 start) with Triple-A El Paso Chihuahuas throwing 85.2 innings going 6-7 with a 5.78 ERA with 69 strikeouts and one save. He elected free agency on November 2.
