= P. J. Phillips =

American baseball player and manager

Charleston Dirty Birds
- Manager
- Born: September 23, 1986 (age 38); Newport News, Virginia
- Bats: Right Throws: Right

Teams
- As player: AZL Angels (2005); Orem Owlz (2006); Cedar Rapids Kernels (2007); Rancho Cucamonga Quakes (2008-2009); Mesa Solar Sox (2009); Inland Empire 66ers (2011); Pensacola Blue Wahoos (2012); Louisville Bats (2012); Long Island Ducks (2013); Camden Riversharks (2014); Vallejo Admirals (2014-2018); As manager: Vallejo Admirals (2016-2019); Lexington Legends (2021-2022); New Jersey Jackals (2023); Charleston Dirty Birds (2024-present)

Career highlights and awards
- Atlantic League champion (2021); Pacific Association champion (2017); Co-Pacific Association Manager of the Year (2017)

Patrick James "P. J." Phillips (born September 23, 1986) is an American former professional baseball player and current manager of the Charleston Dirty Birds of the Atlantic League of Professional Baseball. He was previously the manager of the Lexington Legends and the Vallejo Admirals. He is the brother of former Major League second baseman Brandon Phillips. Phillips was most recently the manager of the New Jersey Jackals of the Frontier League, an independent baseball league.

== Playing career ==
Phillips was a second-round draft choice of the Los Angeles Angels of Anaheim where he played six seasons in their organization. In 2012, he played for the Louisville Bats, the AAA affiliate of the Cincinnati Reds. Over 590 affiliated games, Phillips held a .248 average with 40 career home runs and 223 runs batted in.

In 2013, he signed with the Long Island Ducks where he would begin his independent baseball playing career. In 2014, Phillips signed with the Vallejo Admirals before signing with the Camden Riversharks in the middle of August. In 2015, Phillips would return to the Admirals where he would play the remainder of his career through the 2017 season.

== Coaching career ==
=== Vallejo Admirals ===
While playing with the Admirals in 2016, Phillips would take the reins as manager after the team started a slow 11–16. In 2017, Phillips would claim his first Pacific Association championship in a victory against the Sonoma Stompers. This strong finish earned him co-manager of the year honors. Over parts of four seasons, Phillips held a 128–145 record with the Admirals.

=== Lexington Legends ===
In 2021, Phillips became the manager of the Lexington Legends of the Atlantic League. After finishing 60–60 in the regular season, the Legends defeated the Charleston Dirty Birds in the semi-finals and Long Island Ducks in the championship. This victory gave Phillips his second championship as a manager. Over two seasons, Phillips held a 116–136 record as manager of the Legends.

=== New Jersey Jackals ===
On November 7, 2022, Phillips was named manager of the New Jersey Jackals of the Frontier League. In his only season with the Jackals, Phillips led them to a 60–35 2023 regular season record. They defeated the Sussex County Miners in the wild card game and were then defeated by the Québec Capitales in the semi-finals.

=== Charleston Dirty Birds ===
On November 13, 2023, Phillips was named manager of the Charleston Dirty Birds of the Atlantic League.

=== Managerial record ===
As of September 19, 2025

Team	Year	Regular season					Postseason			
Team	Year	Games	Won	Lost	Win %	Finish	Won	Lost	Win %	Result
VAL	2016	51	21	30	.412	4th	–	–	–	
VAL	2017	78	36	42	.462	t-2nd	1	0	1.000	Won championship (SON)
VAL	2018	80	37	43	.463	3rd	0	1	.000	Lost semi-final (SRF)
VAL	2019	64	34	30	.531	3rd	0	1	.000	Lost wild card (NAPA)
VAL total		273	128	145	.469		1	2	.333	
LEX	2021	120	60	60	.500	2nd in ATL South	5	2	.714	Won championship (LI)
LEX	2022	132	56	76	.424	4th in ATL South	–	–	–	
LEX total		252	116	136	.460		5	2	.714	
NJ	2023	95	60	35	.632	2nd in FL East	2	2	.500	Lost semi-final (QC)
NJ total		95	60	35	.632		2	2	.500	
CHS	2024	126	69	57	.548	3rd in ATL South	3	4	.429	Lost championship (YORK)
CHS	2025	126	52	74	.413	5th in ATL South	–	–	–	
CHS total		252	121	131	.480		3	4	.429	
Total		872	425	447	.487		11	10	.524	
