= Sean Conroy =

American baseball player (born 1992)

- Pitcher
- Born: March 18, 1992 (age 34); Clifton Park, New York, U.S.
- Bats: Right Throws: Right
- Stats at Baseball Reference

Sean Conroy (born March 18, 1992) is an American former professional baseball pitcher. He competed for the Sonoma Stompers of the Pacific Association. Conroy is prominently featured in the book The Only Rule Is It Has to Work, by Ben Lindbergh and Sam Miller. Conroy made history in 2015 as the first openly gay active professional baseball player, while playing with the Sonoma Stompers.

== Early life ==
Sean Conroy was born on March 18, 1992. He grew up in Clifton Park, New York. He came out as gay to friends and family at the age of 16. He was open about his sexuality with teammates at both the high school and collegiate levels.

== College career ==
Conroy attended NCAA Division III Rensselaer Polytechnic Institute, where he pitched for the Engineers baseball team. During his time at RPI, he amassed a 21–7 record with a 2.05 ERA. He struck out 223 batters in 259 innings of work. His senior season success earned him D3baseball.com second team All American honors, along with first team All-New York region honors.

== Professional career ==
Following his senior season at RPI, Sean Conroy signed with the Sonoma Stompers of the Pacific Association. The team had never seen him pitch before, but signed him as a result of his impressive statistics at RPI. The team did not know his sexuality at the time of his signing. Upon his arrival Conroy began the process of telling individual teammates, and eventually owner Eric Gullotta. Conroy made his debut after publicly coming out on June 25, 2015 during the team's "Pride Night" game. Conroy pitched a complete-game shutout while striking out 11 batters. Conroy finished the season with a record of 5–3 while maintaining at 2.70 ERA. He also earned 10 saves. In 2016, Conroy went 4–2 with a 5.02 ERA. Conroy retired from baseball in 2017.

== See also ==
- List of LGBT sportspeople
