= Hollywood Stars (Pecos League) =

Professional baseball travel team

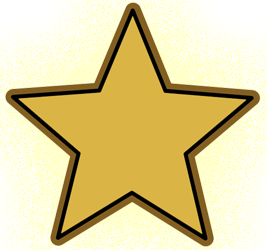
- Logo

Information
- League: The Western League
- Location: Los Angeles, California
- Ballpark: Griffith Park
- Founded: 2016
- Folded: 2019
- Former leagues: Canadian American Association of Professional Baseball; Pecos League
- Colors: Black, gold, white
- Manager: Relly Mercurio
- Website: hollywood.pecosleague.com

The Hollywood Stars were a professional baseball travel team nominally based in Los Angeles, California. They played their inaugural season in 2017, as a member of the Pecos League, an independent baseball league which is not affiliated with Major League Baseball or Minor League Baseball. They played the 2018 season in the Can-Am League, appearing in a total of 9 games. In 2019, they joined The Western League as a charter team.

== Season By Season Results ==
Year	W	L
2017	20	39
2018	1	8
2019	6	0

== Roster ==
Hollywood Stars Roster
Active Roster	Coaching Staff
Pitchers: 6 Devin Alexander; 7 Tanner Klein; 17 Chance Miranda; 10 Donald Wanner Jr.; 22 Trevor Wick; Catchers: 16 Colton La Vergne; 30 Austin Maltby; 57 Jake Pulcheon; Infielders: 3 Derek Almonte; 9 Nolan Hoff; 18 Relly Mercurio; 14 Josh Youngchild; Outfielders: 15 Jordan Ackerman; 31 Burton De Konig; 39 Richard Kerr; 19 Raphael Matchett	Manager: 18 Relly Mercurio; Coaches: Disabled list; ‡ Inactive list; >§ Suspended list; Roster updated February 9, 2019 Transactions
