= Sammy Gervacio =

Dominican baseball player (born 1985)

- Pitcher
- Born: January 10, 1985 (age 41); Sabana de la Mar, Dominican Republic
- Batted: Right Threw: Right

MLB debut
- August 14, 2009, for the Houston Astros

Last MLB appearance
- May 3, 2010, for the Houston Astros

MLB statistics
- Win–loss record: 1–2
- Earned run average: 3.65
- strikeouts: 28
- Stats at Baseball Reference

Teams
- Houston Astros (2009–2010)

Samuel Gervacio (born January 10, 1985) is a Dominican former professional baseball pitcher. He played in Major League Baseball (MLB) for the Houston Astros from 2009 to 2010. He is known for his unusual windup.

== Career ==
=== Houston Astros ===
Gervacio was originally signed as an undrafted free agent by the Houston Astros on December 3, 2002. Gervacio began playing in the minor leagues in 2005, playing for the Rookie League Greeneville Astros and the Single-A Lexington Legends. Gervacio had a 3–2 record with a 2.67 ERA for Greeneville and led the team in games pitched (21), saves (8), and was tied for second in strikeouts with 53. Gervacio also made 5 relief appearances for the Legends, getting one win with an 0.96 ERA.

In 2006, Gervacio played for the Legends again, this time for an entire season. With a 7–5 record and a 2.47 ERA, he led the team in games pitched (47) and saves (10). In 2007, Gervacio began the season for the Single-A Salem Avalanche. He had a 1–3 record with a 2.44 ERA and led the team with 18 saves. On August 5, Gervacio was promoted to the Double-A Corpus Christi Hooks, where he finished the season. For the Hooks, he went 3–2 with a 1.99 ERA.

On November 20, 2007, the Astros purchased Gervacio's contract, protecting him from the Rule 5 Draft. On July 30, 2009, Gervacio was called up to the Houston Astros from Triple-A Round Rock after the Astros released Russ Ortiz.

Gervacio signed a one-year minor league contract with the Astros for the 2011 season, with an invitation to spring training.

=== Rieleros de Aguascalientes ===
He pitched for the Rieleros de Aguascalientes of the Mexican League in 2013, pitching a 5.35 ERA in 37 games.

=== Shinano Grandserows ===
On July 18, 2013, the Shinano Grandserows of Baseball Challenge League signed Gervacio. In Shainano, he pitched in 14 games, throwing 14 2/3 innings with a 2–0 record and 21 strikeouts. He held a 2.45 ERA and allowed just nine hits. On September 13, it was announced Gervacio voluntarily retired.

=== Bridgeport Bluefish ===
He played for the Bridgeport Bluefish of the Atlantic League in 2015, after skipping the 2014 season. He pitched to a 4.33 ERA in 47 games with the Bluefish in 2015. He did considerably better in 2016, with a 1.98 ERA in 35 appearances.

=== Vallejo Admirals ===
In 2017, he played for the Vallejo Admirals of the Pacific Association, pitching to a 3.46 ERA in 36 appearances.

=== New Britain Bees ===
He signed with the New Britain Bees of the Atlantic League of Professional Baseball for the 2018 season, hurling 51 games with a 2.52 ERA. He became a free agent following the season.

He re-signed with the Bees for the 2019 season, and became a free agent after the season.

=== Road Warriors ===
On February 13, 2020, Gervacio signed with the Road Warriors of the Atlantic League of Professional Baseball. He did not play a game for the team because of the cancellation of the 2020 ALPB season due to the COVID-19 pandemic and became a free agent after the year.
