= Vallejo Admirals =

Baseball team in California, U.S.

- Logo

Information
- League: Pacific Association of Professional Baseball Clubs (2013–2021)
- Location: Vallejo, California
- Ballpark: Wilson Park
- Founded: 2013
- Folded: 2021
- League championships: 2017
- Colors: Navy, Gold, Gray, white
- Ownership: Dave Phinney
- General manager: Heather Luna
- Manager: PJ Phillips
- Media: Tim Fitzgerald
- Website: www.vallejoadmirals.com

The Vallejo Admirals were an independent professional baseball team based in Vallejo, California. They were members of the Pacific Association of Professional Baseball Clubs, which was not associated with Major League Baseball. In 2017, the Admirals won the Pacific Association championship.

== History ==
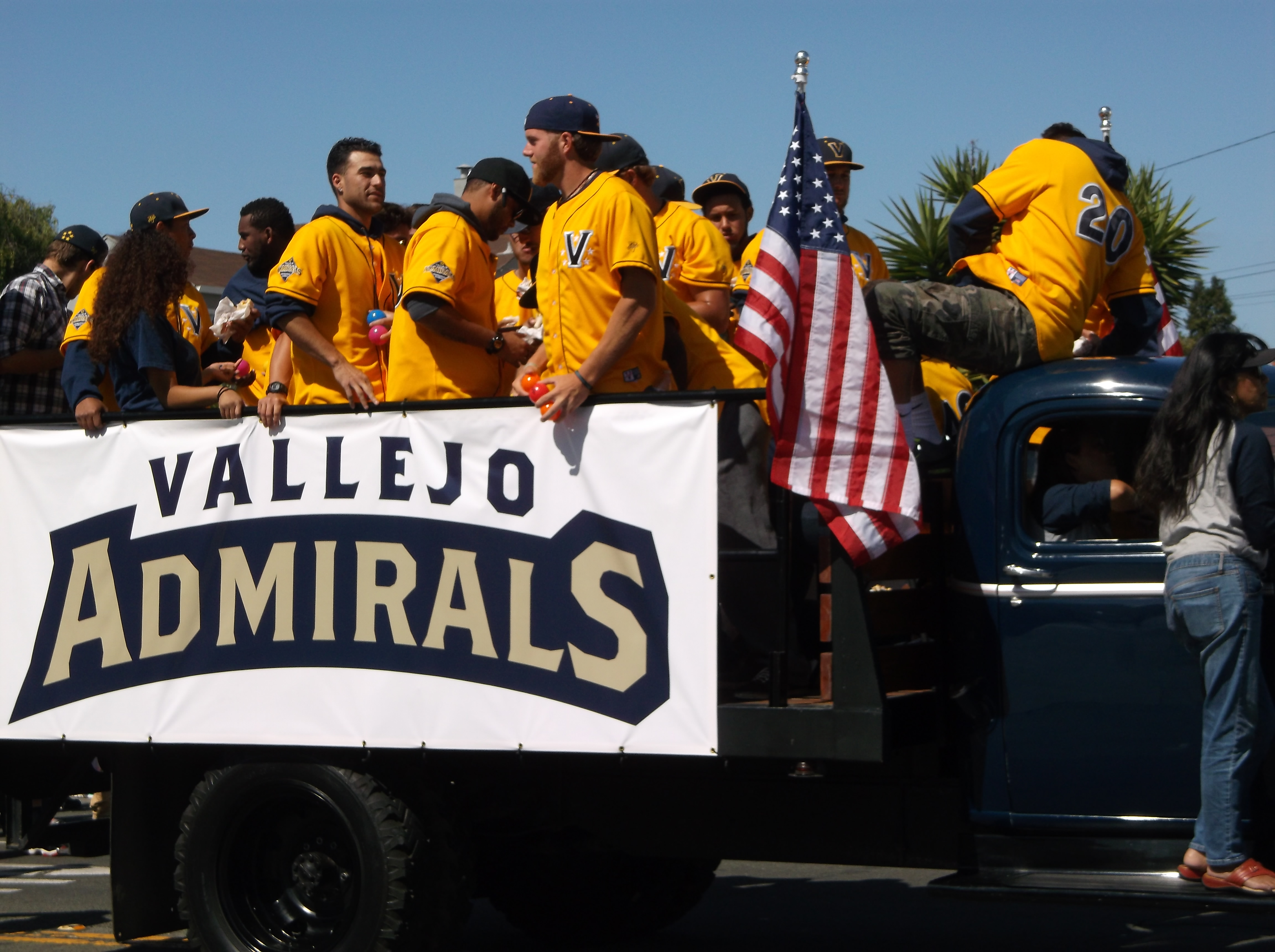
The Vallejo Admirals baseball team sits atop a float for the 4th of July parade in 2014

The Admirals began play as a charter member of the four-team Pacific Association of Professional Baseball Clubs, along with the Hawaii Stars, Na Koa Ikaika Maui, and San Rafael Pacifics, former members of the now-defunct North American League.

The Admirals started play at Wilson Park in Vallejo in the spring of 2013. They club was originally owned by Redwood Sports and Entertainment, which also owns the San Rafael Pacifics.

The Admirals were subsequently sold to Joe Fontana, who named ex-big leaguer Pedro Guerrero field manager in April 2013.

In July 2013, the league suspended the team for failure to pay players, employees, and rent, among other financial problems. Under new ownership and a new manager in Tito Fuentes Jr., the team returned to play on July 31, 2013, with an 11–2 win over the East Bay Lumberjacks. The team finished the season in third place overall, winning all of its playoff games at Wilson Park, but falling to Maui, 8–3, in the semifinals in San Rafael. Shortstop Jesse Olivar out of Cosumnes River College was named team MVP.

First baseman Nathan Tomaszewski became the first Admirals player to be signed by an affiliated club. He was signed by the Pittsburgh Pirates following the 2013 season and played one year with Pittsburgh's rookie affiliate, the Bristol Pirates.

Robert Young, former owner of the two now-defunct Hawaii franchises, purchased the team prior to the 2014 season. With a new manager, Garry Templeton II, the Admirals went 44–34 and finished in second place in the Pacific Association. The team had an opportunity to win the second half, assuring them a second consecutive postseason appearance, but fell to San Rafael on the final day of the regular season, 11–8.

Templeton II was named the Pacific Association Manager of the Year for the 18-win turnaround compared to the 2013 season. Right fielder Jordan Hinshaw earned the league's Rookie of the Year Award while also being named a top defender at his position. Along with Hinshaw, Tillman Pugh (center field), Elvin Rodriguez (shortstop), and Michael Cerda (third base) all received the league's top defensive award at their positions.

During the 2015 offseason, general manager Kathy Beistel purchased the team from Young and located Kevin Reilly, a local realtor, as a silent partner to provide operating funds. Despite the large cash infusion, player salaries were halved for the last month of the season, and the Admirals finished the season 25–53 overall in last place.

At the end of 2015, Beistel announced she had sold her remaining shares to Reilly, who became the sole share owner.

In 2016, team operations solidified in every aspect. Attendance was up almost 50%, and the game-day experience was greatly improved by adding stadium seating, a picnic/dining area behind first base, pre-game and between-inning entertainment, and improved cost and selection in food and merchandise. Gone were the days of ownership instability, and the team had become a civic asset and a vehicle for local business to be seen in the community.

The Admirals hired Mike Samuels as manager. Samuels' staff consisted of former big leaguer Warren Brusstar and a pair of major league draft picks Tim Wallace (Chicago Cubs) and Lonnie Jackson (Los Angeles Dodgers).

Samuels and his staff were replaced one month into the season with manager PJ Phillips, who became the first player-manager for the Admirals. Phillips spent seven seasons in the Los Angeles Angels of Anaheim organization after being a 2nd-round pick in the 2005 Major League Baseball draft, and two with the Cincinnati Reds organization before starting his independent baseball career with the Long Island Ducks of the Atlantic League in 2013.

Phillips hit exactly .300 with 32 RBI in 52 games with the Admirals in 2014. In 2015, Phillips hit .302 with nine home runs, and a single-season record for doubles in the Pacific Association with 27. His minor league resume and influence over the clubhouse made him the front office's choice for player-manager. Kenneth Owen was hired as Phillips' assistant coach, while Roman Gomez was hired as pitching coach.

The Admirals went 32–46 during the 2016 season. The Admirals did, however, experience a large attendance increase and improved on-field performance. Highlights of the season included a Pacific Association record shattering 99 stolen bases by Darian Sandford, and several players earning awards, including the Pacific Association Rookie of the Year Marquis Hutchinson. Joining Hutchinson were first baseman Lydell Moseby, third baseman Gerald Bautista and right fielder Tim Williams, all who were deemed the best defenders at their positions by the Pacific Association.

Just nine games into the 2016 season, closer Tim Holmes became the second Admirals player to advance into affiliated baseball when his contract was purchased by the New York Yankees. In 14 appearances with the Gulf Coast League Yankees, Holmes boasted a 0.59 ERA and 15 strikeouts in 15.1 innings.

During the offseason, a pair of Admirals players were signed by affiliated clubs, including second baseman Alian Silva with the Washington Nationals and starter Kida De La Cruz with the Los Angeles Angels of Anaheim.

In the 2019 offseason, the team was sold to Dave Phinney, a Napa Valley winemaker and one of the partners of the Nimitz Group.

Their seasons was cancelled in 2020 due to the effects of the COVID-19 pandemic. There have not been any new updates since April 2021 suggesting that the franchise, like the league, has quietly folded.

== 2017 Championship ==
The Admirals opened their fifth season of Pacific Association play in 2017 by hosting the San Rafael Pacifics on June 2 at Wilson Park. The franchise had two major signings in spring training in their first former big leaguer in reliever Sammy Gervacio, and their first ever former first-round draft pick in outfielder Chevy Clarke. The Admirals drafted Vallejo native and Benicia High product Peter Reyes first overall at the 2017 Pacific Association Tryout.

It was the first full season as manager for PJ Phillips, and the team stumbled out to a first-half record of 12–27. Phillips had to re-tool a roster that had finished at the bottom of the standings in two-straight seasons, and weed out the leftovers from the previous regime that had not bought into his program. Phillips revamped his infield by bringing in Pacific Association veteran David Kiriakos to play shortstop, De La Salle High and Pepperdine University product Chris Fornaci to play third, and University of Texas at Arlington grad Quintin Rohrbaugh to play second base. Infielder Graylin Derke settled in at first base and Phillips brought in new arms to pair with his much-improved infield defense, including UC Bakersfield rookie Mahlik Jones, former Cubs farm hand Andin Diaz, and Iona College's Alex Fishberg.

This bolstered a core of returners and new talent who specifically came to Vallejo to play for Phillips, including the returns of outfielder Tillman Pugh and pitchers Tim Holmes and Demetrius Banks. Even though the team began the second half just 1–6, improvement in their play and energy was visible. The team then went on a 20–7 run through the month of August, and won the head-to-head match up with the first-half champion Sonoma Stompers 7–5. That gave the Admirals the tie-breaker for the second-half championship as both teams finished the second half with 24–15 records. Reyes got the victory to clinch the second-half title by pitching six innings and allowing three runs with just one walk and seven strikeouts in a 12–5 victory over San Rafael.

This put the Admirals in their first ever Pacific Association championship game on September 1, 2017, in Sonoma. Vallejo jumped out to an early lead and were up 9–1 in the fourth inning. The defending champion Stompers stormed back though and cut it to 9–8 before the Admirals reclaimed a three-run lead with runs in the eight and ninth inning, and held on to win 11–8.

It was the first Pacific Association championship for the Vallejo Admirals, and completed a 25-game turnaround from worst to first in one season. Gervacio set the single-season record for saves in the Pacific Association with 18, Banks became the Admirals' single-season leader for strikeouts with 86, and Pugh set the single season record for home runs with 18 and also became the franchise's all-time leader in hits and RBI.

== Season-by-season results ==
Vallejo Admirals
Season	Overall	Win %	Standing	Manager	Postseason
2013	28–32†	.467	3rd	Pedro Guerrero (11–21); Tito Fuentes Jr. (17–11)	Won round robin (East Bay), (Hawaii) 4–0; Lost semifinal Maui
2014	44–34	.564	T-2nd in Division (first half); 2nd in Division (second half)	Garry Templeton II	Did not qualify
2015	25–53	.321	4th in Division (first half); 4th in Division (second half)	Garry Templeton II	Did not qualify
2016	32–46	.410	4th in Division (first half); T-3rd in Division (second half)	Mike Samuels (11–16); P. J. Phillips (21–30)	Did not qualify
2017	36–42	.462	4th in Division (first half); 1st in Division (second half)	P. J. Phillips	Won championship game (Sonoma)
2018	37–43	.463	4th	P. J. Phillips	Lost semifinals (San Rafael)
2019	34–30	.531	3rd	P. J. Phillips	Lost wild card (Napa)
Totals	236–280	.457	—	—	5–3 (.625)

† 2013 post-season was also included in regular season record.

== Notable alumni ==
- Sammy Gervacio (2017)
- Brandon Phillips (2019)
- O'Koyea Dickson (2019)
