= Pittsburg Diamonds =

Logo
Cap insignia

Information
- League: Pacific Association
- Location: Pittsburg, California
- Ballpark: Winter Chevrolet Stadium
- Founded: 2013
- Folded: 2019
- Former name: Pittsburg Mettle
- Colors: Black, orange, white
- Ownership: Khurram Shah
- Manager: Aaron Miles
- Website: diamondsproball.com

The Pittsburg Diamonds were an independent professional baseball team based in Pittsburg, California. Originally named the Pittsburg Mettle, the club changed their name to the Diamonds in 2015.

== History ==
=== 2014: Pittsburg Mettle ===
On April 1, 2014, the Pittsburg Mettle were announced to play alongside San Rafael, Sonoma and Vallejo of the Pacific Association. Former Major League Baseball pitcher Wayne Franklin, wife Cris, and business partner Tom Macari made up the Backwards K Group, the team's owners. The club was an outgrowth of the 2013 traveling club East Bay Lumberjacks. The Mettle's team colors were black, green, dark gray, light gray and white. Franklin was announced as the clubs first player manager. On June 3, the Mettle played their first game against the Vallejo Admirals where they were defeated 2–7. On June 6, the Mettle picked up their first professional win against the San Rafael Pacifics, 8–3. On June 29, actress Stacy Caroll of Major League threw out the ceremonial first pitch. The Mettle held a 22–56 regular season record.

=== 2015–2018: Pittsburg Diamonds ===
In 2015, the club rebranded after Khurram Shah, a local businessman, took over for the 2015 season during which the team made news signing former Oakland Athletics slugger Jose Canseco for two separate weekend stints. Pittsburg was managed by former Major League Baseball professional Aaron Miles, who was a part of the 2006 World Series champion St. Louis Cardinals. In his first season, the Diamonds saw a 16 game win improvement, earning him Manager of the Year honors. In 2016, the Diamonds again signed Canseco, this time to a month-long contract to finish the regular season. Canseco would collect two RBI in 14 plate appearances in addition to making three starts as a pitcher. In 2018, Travis Blackley made the Diamonds first post-season start against the Sonoma Stompers where they were defeated 0–5 in the semi-final.

The club announced before the 2019 season that it would take a one-year hiatus with plans to return in 2020. However, the team hasn’t returned, and the Pacific Association has since folded as well.

== Season-by-season results ==
Season	Overall	Win %	Standing	Manager	Postseason
Pittsburg Mettle
2014	22–56	.282	4th in Division (first half); 4th in Division (second half)	Wayne Franklin	Did not qualify
Pittsburg Diamonds
2015	38–39	.494	3rd in Division (first half); 2nd in Division (second half)	Aaron Miles	Did not qualify
2016	36–42	.462	3rd in Division (first half); T-3rd in Division (second half)	Aaron Miles	Did not qualify
2017	36–42	.462	2nd in Division (first half); T-3rd in Division (second half)	Aaron Miles	Did not qualify
2018	36–44	.450	4th	Aaron Miles	Lost semifinals (Sonoma)
Totals	168–223	.430	—	—	0–1 (.000)

== Notable alumni ==
- Wayne Franklin (2014)
- Tony Torcato (2014-2015)
- Aaron Miles (2014-2016)
- Tony Phillips (2015)
- Jose Canseco (2015-2017)
- Trent Oeltjen (2016)
- Travis Blackley (2017-2018)
