= Pacific Association =

American independent baseball league

Pacific Association of Professional Baseball Clubs
- Most recent season or competition: 2019 Pacific Association season
- Sport: Baseball
- Founded: 2013
- First season: 2013
- Folded: 2022
- Country: United States
- Last champion: San Rafael Pacifics (2019)
- Most titles: San Rafael Pacifics (4)
- Website: pacproclubs.pointstreaksites.com

The Pacific Association of Professional Baseball Clubs was an independent baseball league based in Northern California. The league was founded in 2013 by four former North American League teams.

== History ==
During the initial season, two Hawaii-based teams, the Hawaii Stars and the Maui Warriors, played inter-league games against the Baseball Challenge League of Japan; California teams played against the Freedom Pro League of Arizona.

Both Hawaii teams ceased operations after playing the 2013 season citing high travel costs of bringing in opponents from Northern California. The East Bay Lumberjacks also did not return for a second season.

Two expansion clubs were added in 2014, (the Sonoma Stompers and Pittsburg Mettle) bringing the total number of teams to four.

In 2017, San Francisco businessman and entrepreneur Jonathan Stone was named league commissioner.

Expansion came again in 2018, with the addition of the Martinez Clippers and Napa Silverados. This brought the league to an all-time high of six member clubs.

Before the 2019 season the league lost two teams, Martinez and Pittsburg, which both folded. The Salina Stockade were added to the league for 2019 as a travel team.

Prior to the 2020 season, San Rafael left the league for the Pecos League. The California Dogecoin was listed as an expansion team on the league website, but after the season was postponed by the COVID-19 pandemic were removed without having played a game. The 2020 season was officially cancelled on July 17, 2020. Later, the California Dogecoin formed the Liberation Professional Baseball League.

The Sonoma Stompers announced in October 2021 their intentions to join the California Collegiate League for 2022.

With no new news from the league's website and social media after the 2020 season cancellation, it is believed that the league has indeed folded.

== Teams ==
Pacific Association of Professional Baseball Clubs
Team	Founded	City	Stadium	Capacity	Notes
East Bay Lumberjacks	2013	Concord, California	Laney College	250	Travel team with limited home games. Did not return after 2013 season.
Hawaii Stars	2012	Hilo, Hawaii	Wong Stadium	2,500	Charter member, had previously played in North American Baseball League in 2012. Folded after the 2013 season.
Martinez Clippers	2018	Martinez, California	Joe DiMaggio Fields at Waterfront Park	500	Folded after the 2018 season.
Na Koa Ikaika Maui	2010	Maui, Hawaii	Maehara Stadium	1,500	Charter member, had previously played in the Golden Baseball League (2010) and North American Baseball League (2011–12). First-ever PACA champions, folded after the 2013 season.
Napa Silverados	2017	Napa, California	Miner Family Field	600	Folded after 2019 season.
Pittsburg Diamonds	2013	Pittsburg, California	Winter Chevrolet Stadium	1,000	Originally named the Pittsburg Mettle, the club changed their name to the Diamonds in 2015. Folded prior to the 2019 season.
Salina Stockade	2016	Salina, Kansas	N/A	N/A	Travel team with zero home games. Previously played in Pecos League (2016), American Association of Professional Baseball (2017), Can-Am League (2018), since moved back into Pecos league in (2020–21).
San Rafael Pacifics	2011	San Rafael, California	Albert Park	1,200	Charter member, previously played in North American Baseball League in 2012. Only four-time PACA champion, have since moved to the Pecos League in 2020.
Sonoma Stompers	2014	Sonoma, California	Arnold Field	1,500	Moved to the California Collegiate League in 2021.
Vallejo Admirals	2013	Vallejo, California	Wilson Park	500	Charter team, folded after 2019 season.

=== Teams that never played ===
- California Dogecoin of Fairfield, California – were to have played in the 2020 season, but instead played in the Liberation Professional Baseball League due to the Pacific Association postponing the season due to the COVID-19 pandemic.

== League timeline ==
League members Former Team

== Champions ==
Season	1st Half Winner	2nd Half Winner	League Champion	Playoff Game Result
2013	Na Koa Ikaika Maui	San Rafael Pacifics	Na Koa Ikaika Maui	6–1
2014	San Rafael Pacifics	San Rafael Pacifics	San Rafael Pacifics	none
2015	Sonoma Stompers	San Rafael Pacifics	San Rafael Pacifics	4–3
2016	Sonoma Stompers	Sonoma Stompers	Sonoma Stompers	none
2017	Sonoma Stompers	Vallejo Admirals	Vallejo Admirals	11–8
	Regular season winner	Record	Playoff Champion	Playoff Result
2018	Sonoma Stompers	57–23	San Rafael Pacifics	6–0
2019	Sonoma Stompers	45–19	San Rafael Pacifics	2–1 (best of three)

== Awards ==
Season	League MVP	Pitcher of the Year	Reliever of the Year	Rookie of the Year	Manager of the Year	Executive of the Year
2014	Jayce Ray, Sonoma	Patrick Conroy, San Rafael	Colin Allen, San Rafael	Jordan Hinshaw, Vallejo	Garry Templeton II, Vallejo	none
2015	Matt Chavez, San Rafael	Max Beatty, San Rafael	Sean Conroy, Sonoma	Mark Hurley, Sonoma	Aaron Miles, Pittsburg	Mike Shaprio, San Rafael
2016	Joel Carranza, Sonoma	Patrick Conroy, San Rafael	JR Bunda, San Rafael	Marquis Hutchinson, Vallejo	Takashi Miyoshi, Sonoma	Theo Fightmaster, Sonoma
2017	Tillman Pugh, Vallejo	Tyler Garkow, Sonoma	Sammy Gervacio, Vallejo	Michael Rizzitello, San Rafael	P. J. Phillips, Vallejo; Takashi Miyoshi, Sonoma	Kevin Reilly, Vallejo
2018	Javion Randle, San Rafael	Jared Koenig, San Rafael	Jacob Cox, Sonoma	Kenny Meimerstorf, Sonoma	Zack Pace, Sonoma	Brett Creamer, Sonoma
2019	Raúl Navarro, San Rafael	Dakota Freese, Vallejo	Jailen Peguero, San Rafael; Ryan Richardson, Sonoma	Zane Gelphman, Salina/San Rafael	Zack Pace, Sonoma	Brett Creamer, Sonoma

== Players who advanced to Major League Baseball ==
- RHP Logan Gillaspie (Sonoma 2017)
- LHP Jared Koenig (San Rafael 2017–18)
- RHP Chris Mazza (San Rafael 2018)
