= 2019 Pacific Association season =

- League: Pacific Association
- Sport: Baseball
- Duration: May 31, 2019 – September 1, 2019
- Games: 64 (160 games in total)
- Teams: 5

Regular season
- Season champions: Sonoma Stompers

League postseason
- Finals champions: San Rafael Pacifics
- Runners-up: Sonoma Stompers

PACA seasons
- ← 2018

The 2019 Pacific Association season was the seventh season of the Pacific Association. There was a five team 64 game schedule.

The San Rafael Pacifics entered the season as defending champions, having defeated the Sonoma Stompers 6–0 in the league's 2018 championship game.

They playoffs concluded on September 1, with the San Rafael Pacifics defeating the Sonoma Stompers 2–1 in the championship series, winning their fourth Pacific Association championship.

== Team and rule change ==
The 5 teams in the league played a 64-game schedule. The Salina Stockade were added as a travel team to be the sixth team, but the Pittsburg Diamonds announced they would be going on a hiatus in April just weeks after the Stockade were announced. The Martinez Clippers also folded after the 2018 season.

The Stockade would play as a travel team and play double-headers on Saturdays. The top four teams would qualify for the playoffs with the regular season champion getting a bye to the best-of-three championship series. The third and four seed would play a one-game wild card to advance to the semi-final matchup vs the two seed, which was also a best-of-one.

== Regular season standings ==
as of September 1, 2019

Regular Season Standings
Pos	Team	G	W	L	Pct.	GB
1	y – Sonoma Stompers	64	45	19	.703	--
2	x – San Rafael Pacifics	64	38	26	.594	7.0
3	x – Vallejo Admirals	64	34	30	.531	11.0
4	x – Napa Silverados	64	29	35	.453	16.0
5	e – Salina Stockade	64	14	50	.219	31.0

- y – Clinched division
- x – Clinched playoff spot
- e – Eliminated from playoff contention

=== Record vs. opponents ===
2019 Pacific Association Record vs. opponents
Team	NAPA	SLN	SRF	SON	VAL
Napa	—	12–6	4–9	7–13	6–7
Salina	6–12	—	4–14	3–12	1–12
San Rafael	9–4	14–4	—	4–8	11–10
Sonoma	13–7	12–3	8–4	—	12–5
Vallejo	7–6	12–1	10–11	5–12	—

== Statistical leaders ==
=== Hitting ===
Stat	Player	Team	Total
HR	Nick Akins	Vallejo Admirals	21
AVG	Raúl Navarro	San Rafael Pacifics	.373
RBIs	Axel Johnson	San Rafael Pacifics	67
SB	Omar Artsen	Salina Stockade	50

=== Pitching ===
Stat	Player	Team	Total
W	(Nick Barnese, Vijay Patel), Dakota Freese	(Sonoma Stompers),Vallejo Admirals	7
ERA	Dakota Freese	Vallejo Admirals	2.91
SO	Carl Brice	Vallejo Admirals	100
SV	Jailen Peguero	San Rafael Pacifics	16

To qualify as league leader for hitter, AVG - Minimum of plate appearances of 2.7 per team game. To qualify as league leader for pitcher, ERA - Minimum inning(s) of .8 pitched per team game.

== Playoffs ==
=== Format ===
In 2019, The top four teams would qualify for the playoffs with the regular season champion getting a bye to the best-of-three championship series. The third and four seed would play a one-game wild card to advance to the semi-final matchup vs the two seed, which was also a best-of-one. The playoffs were held August 28 through September 1.

Wild Card Game

Semi-final Game

Championship Series (best-of-three)
1	Sonoma Stompers	5	5	3
2	San Rafael Pacifics	8	4	5

=== Individual Awards ===
Award	Player	Team
Most Valuable Player	Raúl Navarro	San Rafael Pacifics
Pitcher of the Year	Dakota Freese	Vallejo Admirals
Reliever of the Year	Jailen Peguero, Ryan Richardson	San Rafael Pacifics, Sonoma Stompers
Rookie of the Year	Zane Gelphman	Salina Stockade, San Rafael Pacifics
Manager of the Year	Zack Pace	Sonoma Stompers
Executive of the Year	Brett Creamer	Sonoma Stompers

=== Gilded Glove Awards ===
Position	Player	Team
C	Ermindo Escobar	San Rafael Pacifics
1B	Axel Johnson	San Rafael Pacifics
2B	Nick Gotta	Sonoma Stompers
SS	Raúl Navarro	San Rafael Pacifics
3B	Chris Kwitzer	Sonoma Stompers
LF	Nick Ultsch	Napa Silverados
CF	Dondrei Hubbard	Sonoma Stompers
RF	Corey Dempster	San Rafael Pacifics
P	Nick Barnese	Sonoma Stompers

== Notable players ==
Former Major League Baseball players who played in the Pacific Association in 2019

- O'Koyea Dickson (Vallejo)
- Jailen Peguero (San Rafael)
- Brandon Phillips (Vallejo)

Other notable players who played in the Pacific Association in 2019

- Andrew Chin (San Rafael)
- Henry Omana (Sonoma)
- Chris Kwitzer (Sonoma)
- D. J. Sharabi (Sonoma)
