= John Strentzel =

American physician

John Theophil Strentzel
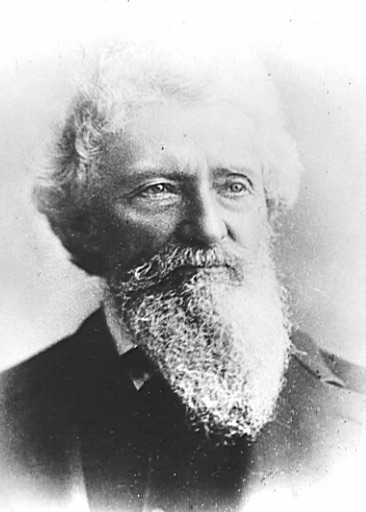
- Born: 29 November 1813; Lublin, Poland
- Died: 31 October 1890 (aged 76); Martinez, California, U.S.
- Occupation: Physician

John Theophil Strentzel (29 November 1813 – 31 October 1890) was a Polish-born physician who gained fame as a pioneer in the area of experimental California horticulture. He is best known as the father-in-law of writer and environmental activist John Muir.

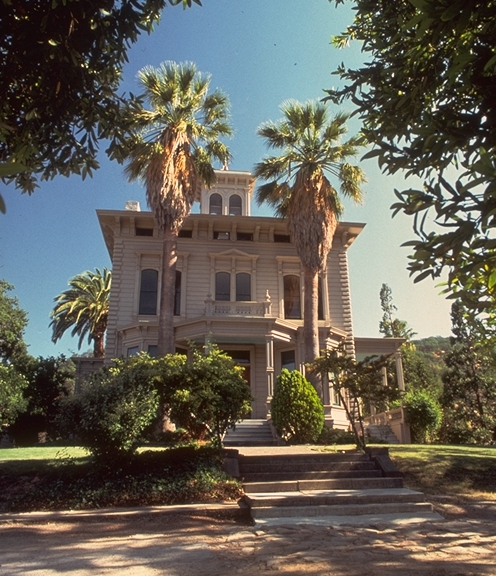
John Theophil Strentzel's home, now the John Muir National Historic Site

== Biography ==
Born in Lublin, Poland into a wealthy family, Strentzel was forced into exile after his participation in the Polish revolution of 1830. To avoid being inducted into the Russian army, he and his brother Henry emigrated to the United States of America, settling in Texas in 1840. It was there, in 1843, that he married his wife, Louisiana Erwin.

In 1849 he made his way out west to California, eventually settling in the state's central valley, along the Tuolumne river, near the LaGrange mining camp, where he established a ferry, hotel and general store before moving on to the Merced River area. Illness and flooding of his home along that river forced him to move again. His wife Louisiana's health was poor so the family moved to Benicia. There a man they had known in Texas, recommended the near by town of Martinez, where they settled in the Alhambra Valley, "a lovely fertile valley protected by high hills, from the cold winds and fog of San Francisco". They purchased twenty acres where they grew crops and fruit.

Strentzel was one of the first scientific horticulturists of the fruit-growing state; his ranch produced and shipped hundreds of tons of fruit annually. Years later, Strenzel was recognized as a foremost expert on California's budding horticultural industry.

In 1880, Strentzel's good friend and companion, John Muir, married Strentzel's daughter, Louisa. In 1882, Dr. Strentzel constructed a 10,000 square foot home on a knoll above his orchards. As one of the wealthiest residents of the area, he and his family became socially prominent and he supported the community. He sponsored the precursor to the Martinez Library, by donating the use one of his buildings to be used as a reading room. After his death, his wife and daughter donated land on the town's Main Street, with the condition that a library be built immediately.

After Dr. Strentzel's death in October 1890, John and Louisa Muir moved into the home. It is now preserved by the National Park Service as part of the John Muir National Historic Site.

Strentzel is buried in a small, private cemetery, along with other family members (including John Muir). The cemetery, now owned by the National Park Service, is located near the family's Alhambra Valley home.
