= Martinez Library =

- Martinez City Library
- U.S. National Register of Historic Places
- Martinez Historic Society Marker
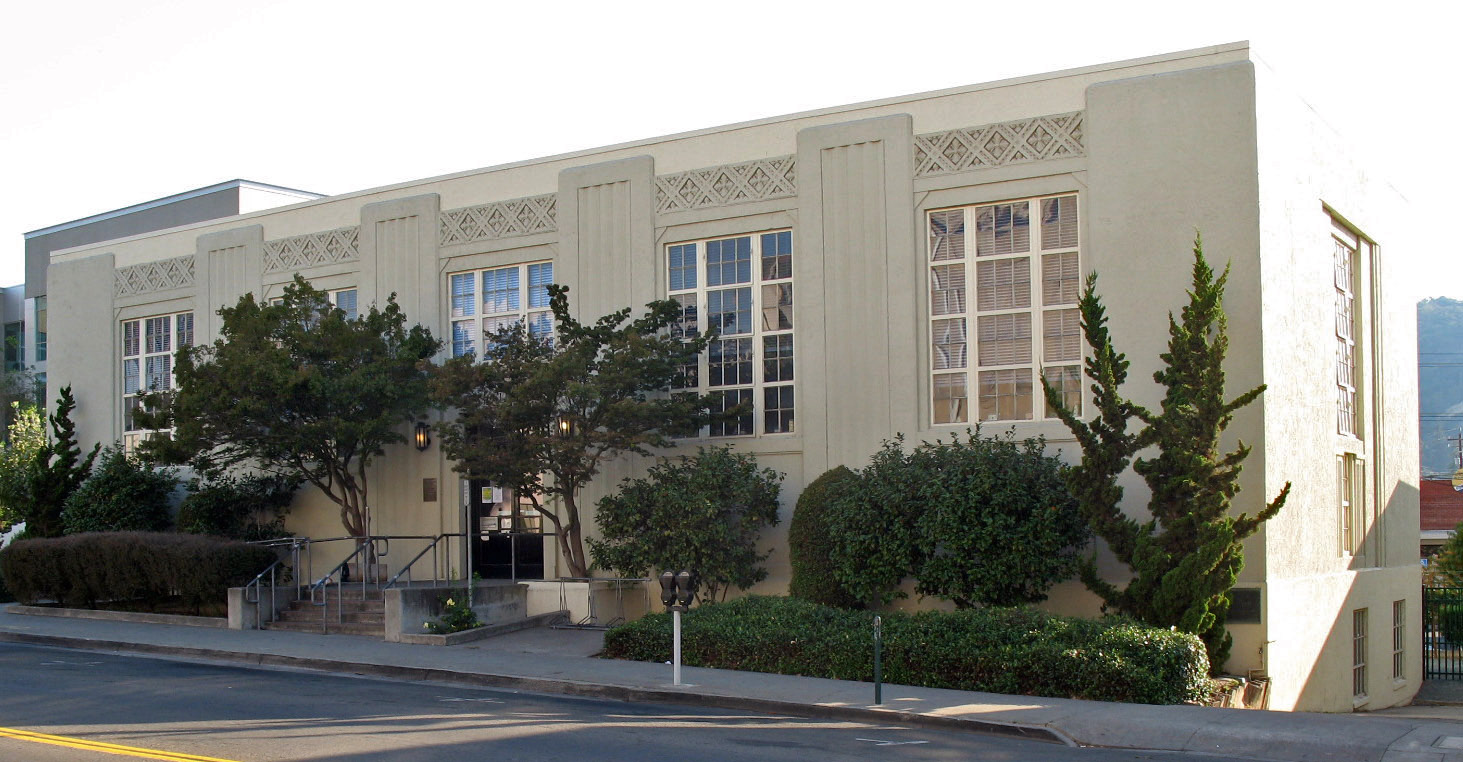
- Library as viewed from front

- Location within San Francisco Bay Area Location within California Location within the United States
- Location: 740 Court St., Martinez, California
- Coordinates: 38°01′05″N 122°08′04″W
- Area: 0.16 acres (0.065 ha)
- Built: 1941; 85 years ago
- Architects: Bangs, E. Geoffrey; Teigland, C.M.
- Architectural style: Art Deco
- Restored: 2011
- Visitation: 88702 (2016)
- Website: ccclib.org/locations/16/
- NRHP reference No.: 07001467
- MHSM No.: 18

Significant dates
- Added to NRHP: January 31, 2008
- Designated MHSM: October 4, 2003

Martinez Library is a historic library located in downtown Martinez, California that is part of the Contra Costa County Library system.

== History ==
Starting in the Fall of 1883, the Esse Quam Videre Club organized to establish a free reading room.

Two years later in 1885 the Martinez Free Reading Room and Library Association was formed, operating out of a building owned by Dr. John Strentzel who charged nothing to the Association. Reading at the location was free, but the Association charged dues of 25 cents a month for the privilege to borrow books.

In 1896 Mrs. John Strentzel and her daughter Louisa Strentzel Muir, wife of John Muir, donated land and a new library was built by popular subscription for US$6,371 (equivalent to about $247,000 in 2025).

After more than 40 years at that location, voters passed a US$18,000 (equivalent to about $394,000 in 2025) bond issue to fund a new library building. The new building was designed in an Art Deco style and completed in 1941.

In November 2008 Measure H was passed narrowly by voters in the city of Martinez to renovate and expand the library. The bond specified a designated children's area, youth recreational opportunities, and improving disabled access.

The US$2,000,000 (equivalent to about $2,953,000 in 2025) renovation work started in November 2010 and the library continued operating for 25 hours per week in a temporary location in the old train depot near Martinez station. The library continued operating in the interim Depot Library until August 13, 2011 when it closed to transition back to the renovated building.

The Martinez Library held the Grand Reopening on Saturday August 20, 2011 with over 1000 visitors entering the library that day. New self-service stations were installed along with new furniture and additional computers.

== Modern ==
The Martinez Library offers a variety of activities and resources for their patrons. Activities vary from story time and lego workshops for children to book clubs for adults.

The library actively seeks to expose patrons to other cultures and has been hosting Chinese Lunar New Year celebration since 2009. Lion dance and other Chinese cultural traditions have been showcased along with crafts.

Lunches were provided to children and teens three days a week in the summer as part of the California Summer Meal Coalition. Many of the families that visited for the program had not been to the library before and had been unaware of the services offered beyond book lending. Library usage increased with the implementation of the program.

== Gallery ==
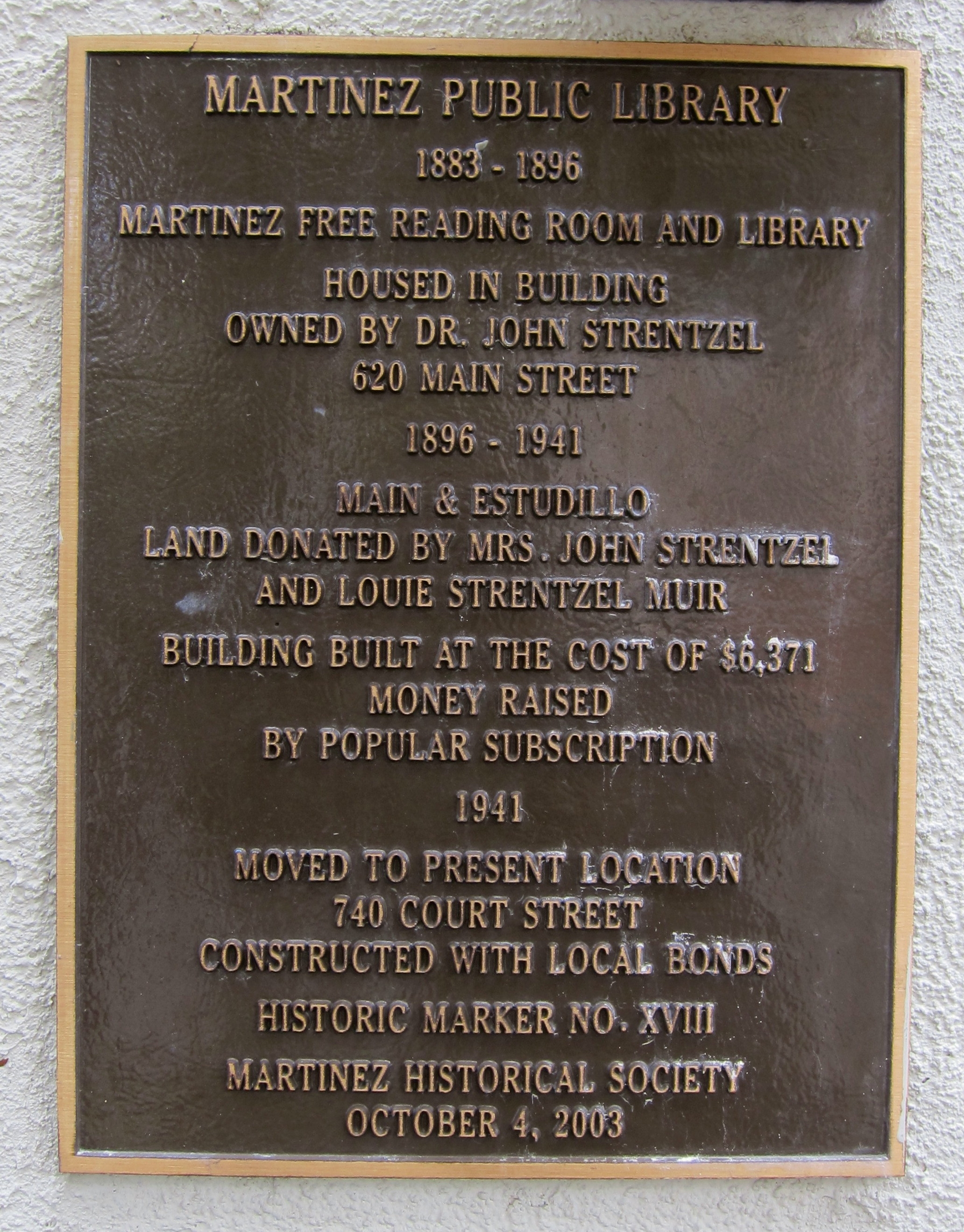
Historic Society Plaque

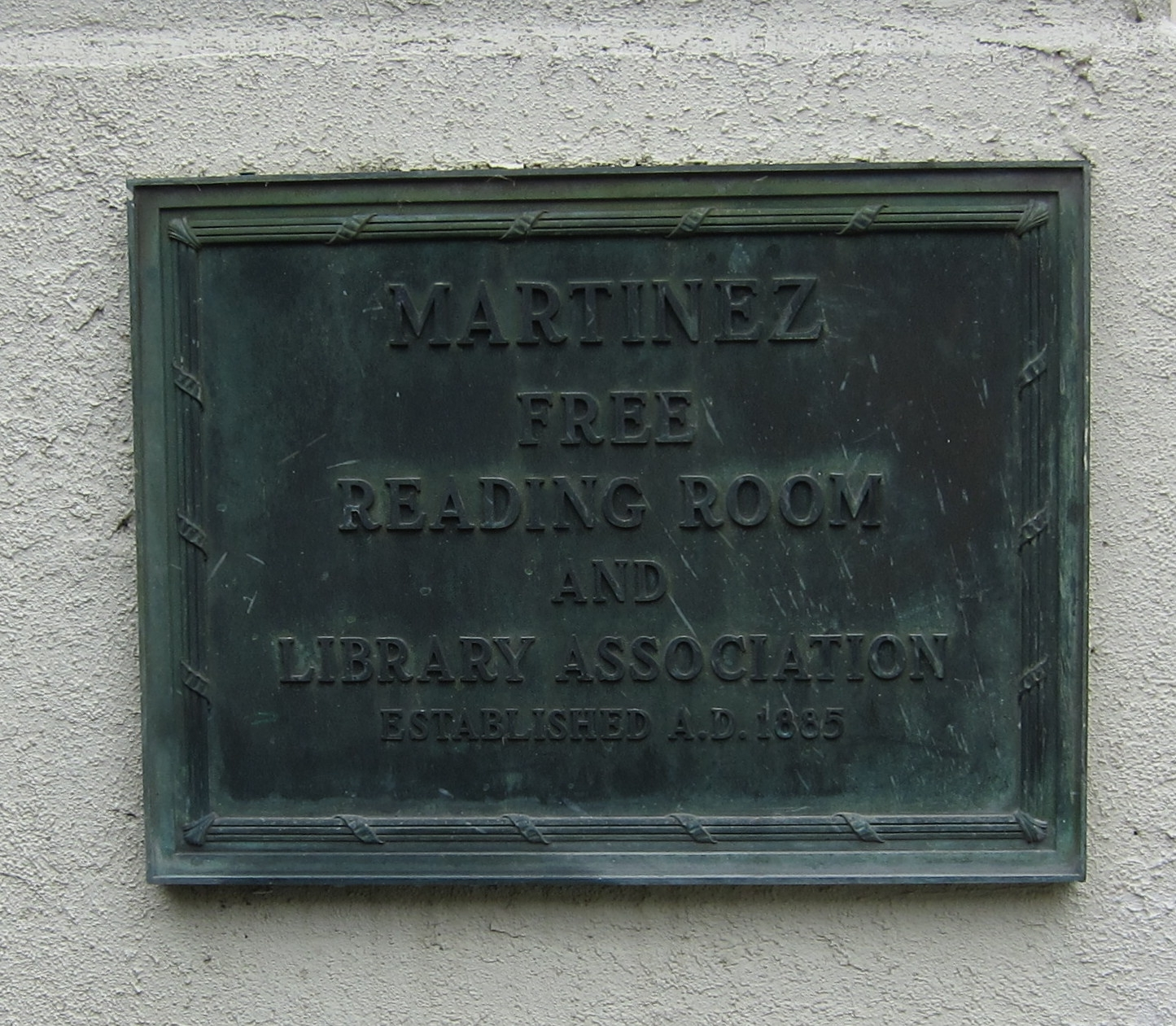
Free Reading Room and Library Association 1885

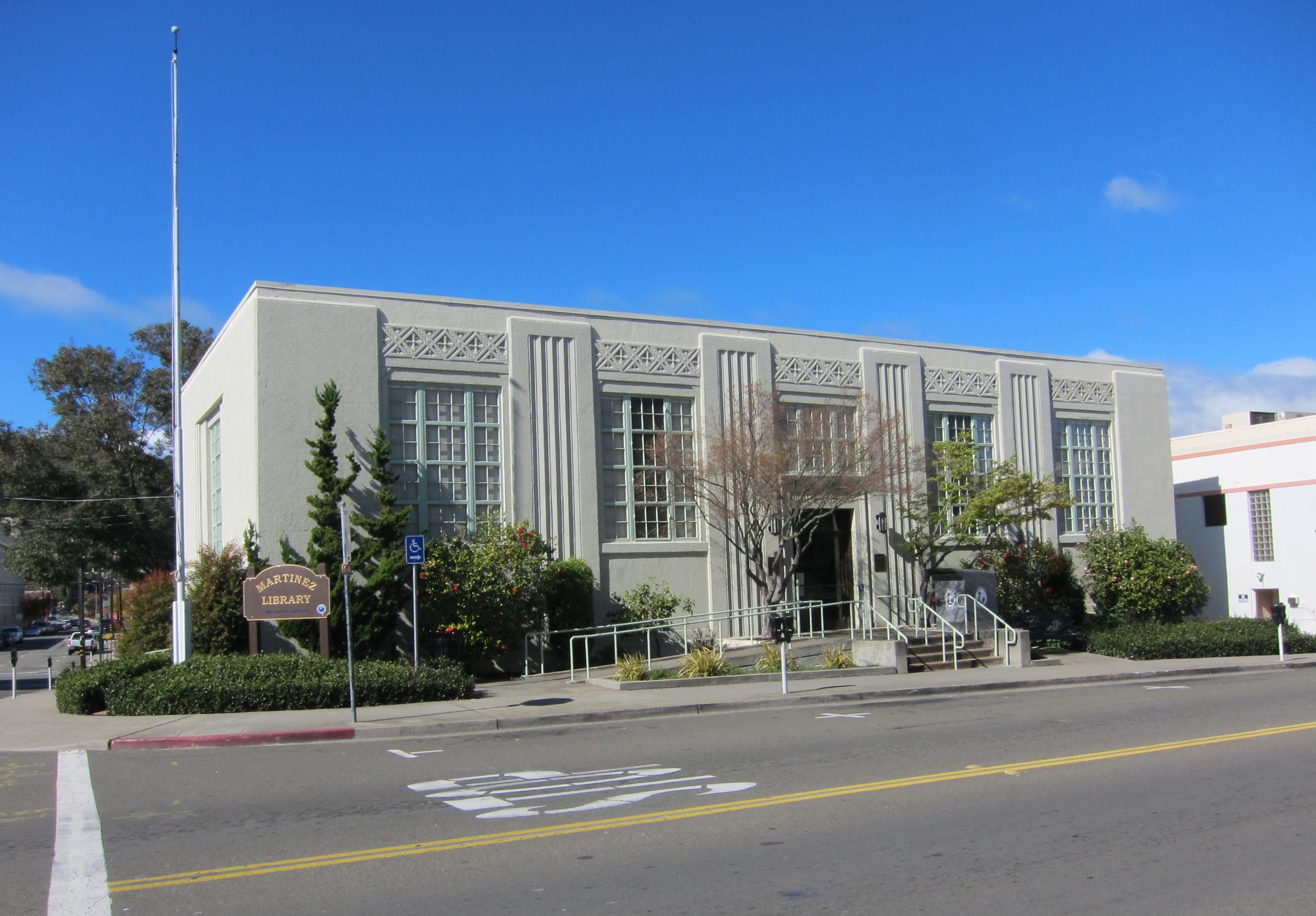
View of Art Deco Architecture style

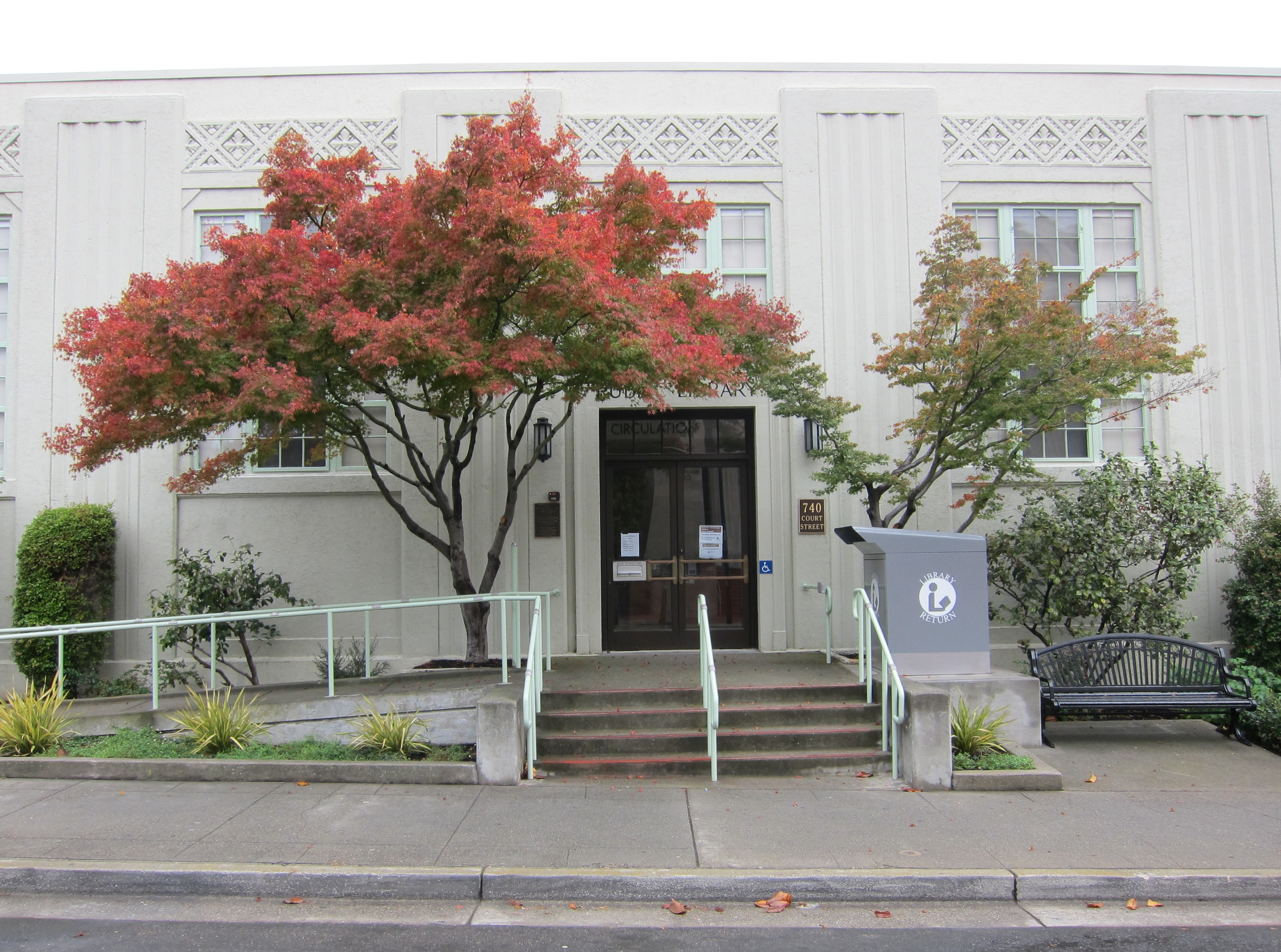
Front entrance of library

== See also ==
- GoLibrary
- National Register of Historic Places listings in Contra Costa County, California
