= St. Catherine of Siena School (Martinez, California) =

Coordinates: 38°0′53.17″N 122°8′5.84″W

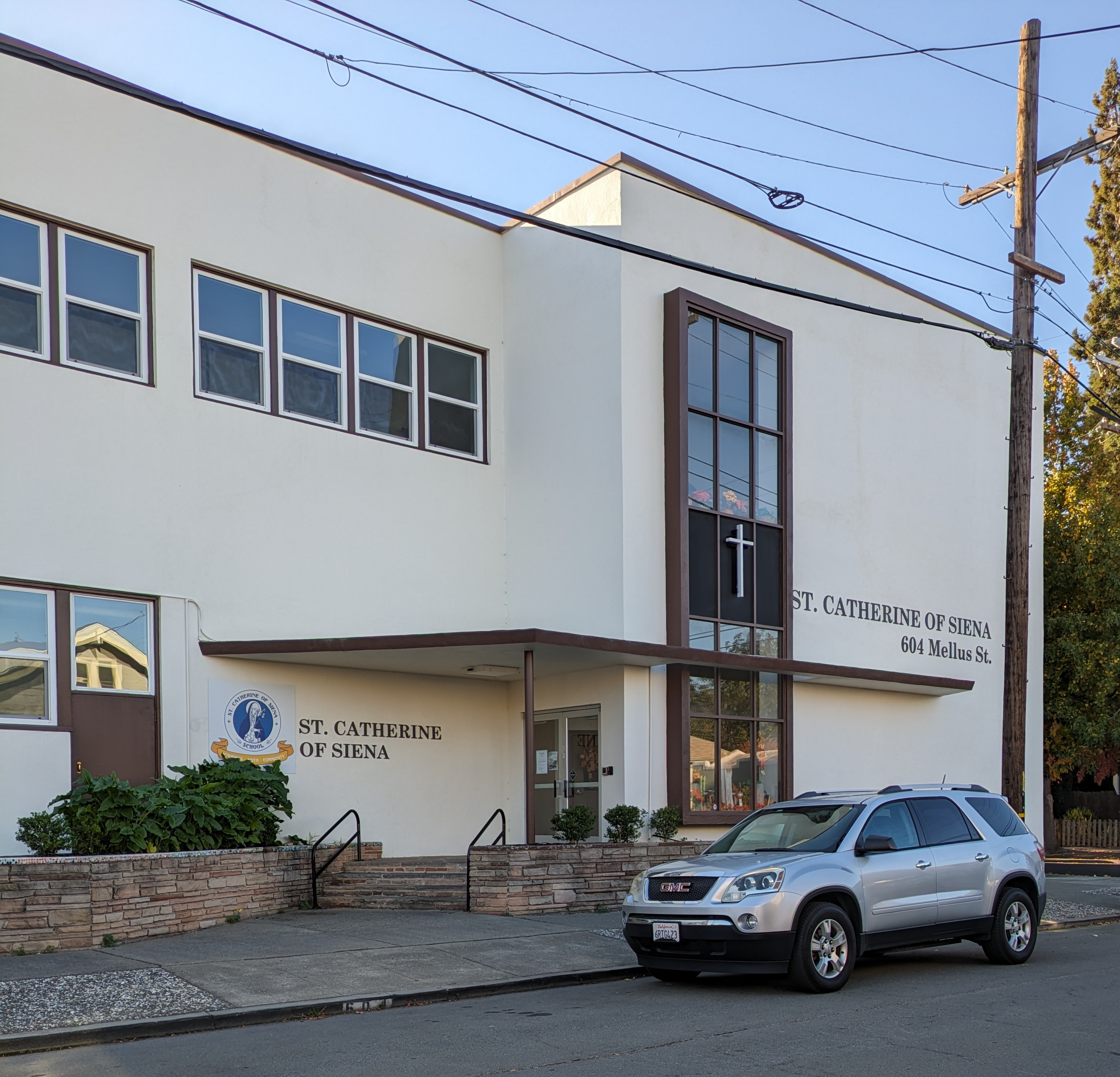
- 604 Mellus Street; Martinez, California 94553; United States

Information
- Type: Private
- Motto: "All students are honored at St. Catherine's" School is included in the diocese of Oakland. Many schools are in the diocese
- School district: Diocese of Oakland
- Staff: 13
- Faculty: 10
- Grades: Pre K–8
- Enrollment: 150
- Color: blue white
- Affiliation: Roman Catholic
- Information: 925-228-4140
- Website: stcatherinemartinez.com

St. Catherine of Siena School in Martinez, California is a Catholic school in the Diocese of Oakland. The school has a Preschool and serves students in Kindergarten through Eighth Grade. Most graduates of the school attend Alhambra High School (Martinez, California), Carondelet High School, or De La Salle High School (Concord, California). Located in the Downtown area of Martinez, the school's north facing wall features a mural of John Muir, the famed naturalist whose home is merely a few minutes down the street driving toward Interstate Highway 4.

The school has a CYO program that consists of basketball, cross country, track and field, and cheerleading (the first cheer squad in the Oakland Diocese). The girls basketball team has had much success in recent years with many diocese victories.
