= Muir Trestle =

Rail bridge in Martinez, California

Coordinates: 37°59′25″N 122°7′40.5″W

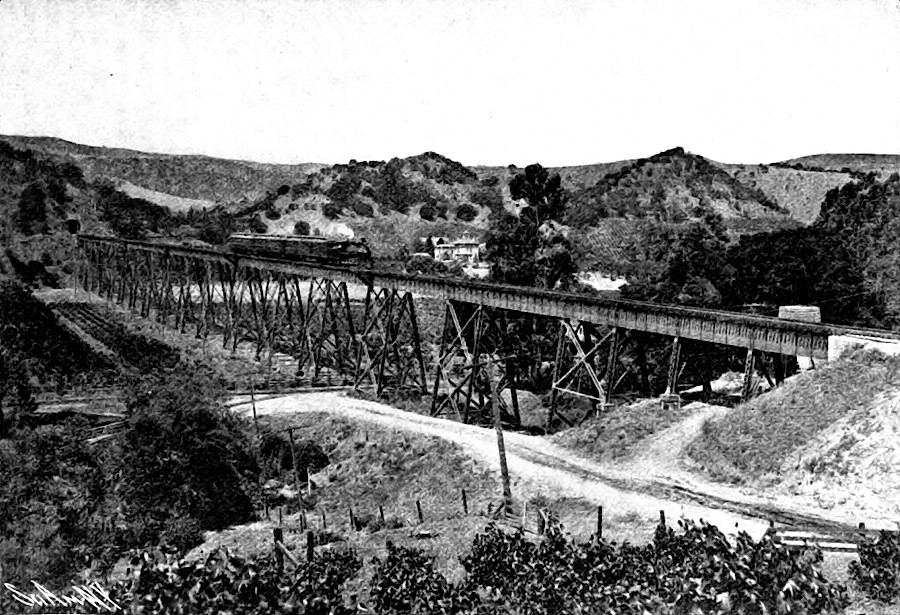
Alhambra Valley Trestle of the San Francisco and San Joaquin Valley Railroad, 1905

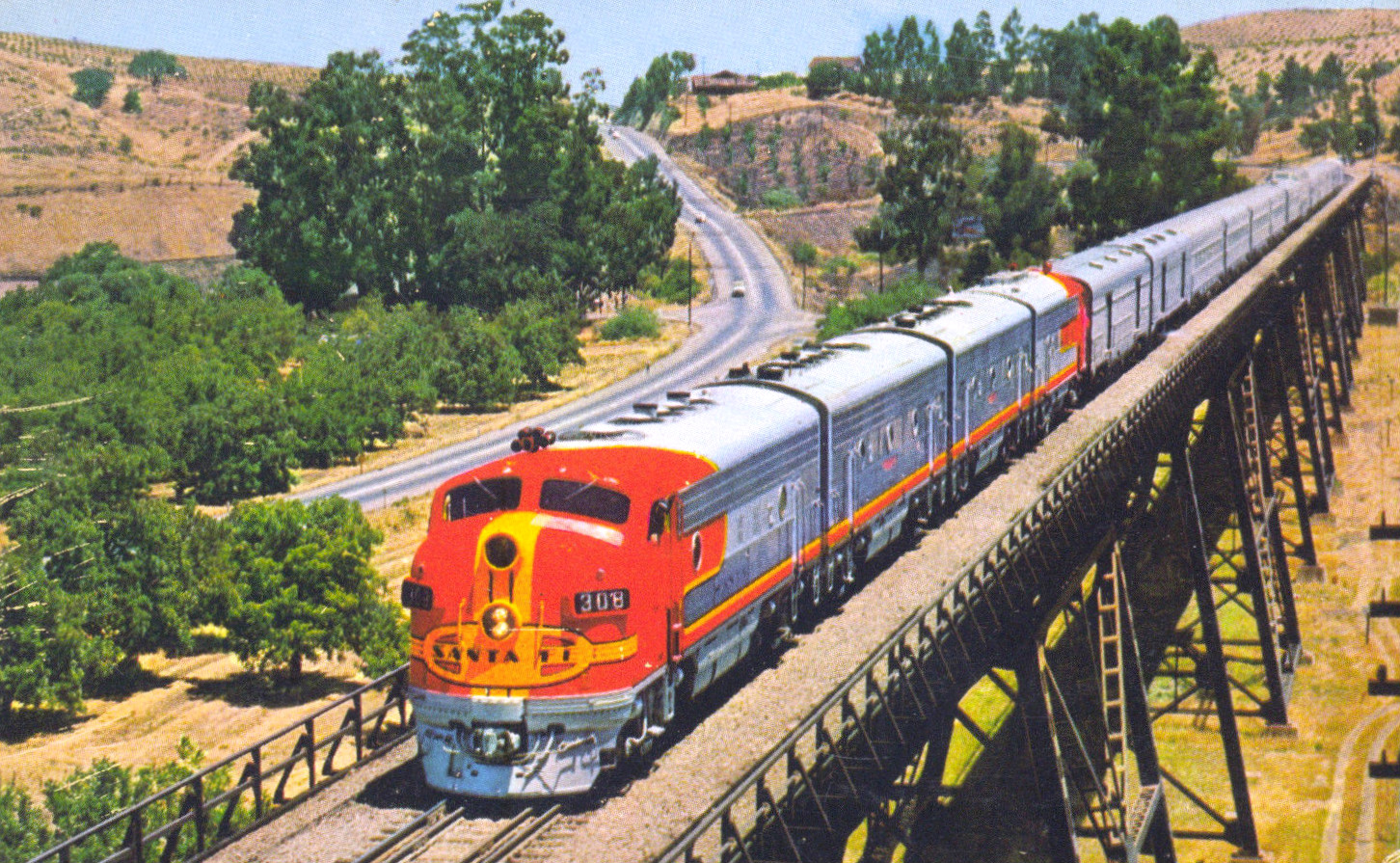
Santa Fe San Francisco Chief running over the trestle, c. 1950

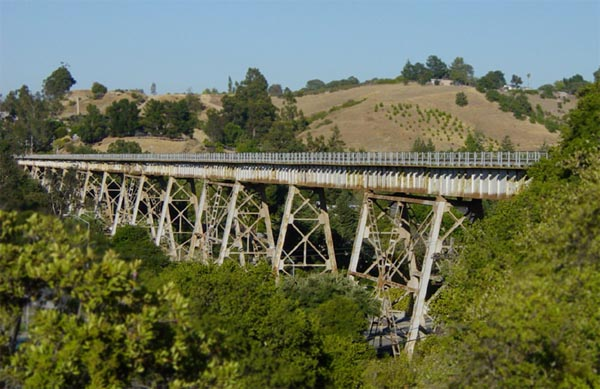
The trestle in 2004

The Muir Trestle, or Alhambra Trestle, is a railway trestle bridge in Martinez, California located within the John Muir National Historic Site. It is owned and operated by BNSF Railway and carries their Stockton Subdivision.

== History ==
In 1897, for the sum of $10 in gold (equivalent to $378 in 2024), John Muir and Louisa Muir ceded a right of way to the San Francisco and San Joaquin Valley Railroad. The agreement describes the land upon which a trestle bridge was to be located: through a pear orchard. The span was completed in 1899. A passenger station was located at the eastern approach.

== Design ==
The trestle is of steel construction resting on concrete piers, carrying a single set of railroad tracks. It spans 1,600 feet (490 m) in length, 75 feet (23 m) above the Alhambra Valley. The western approach feeds directly into the line's 300-foot-long (91 m) Tunnel Number 4.
