= GoLibrary =

Book lending vending machine

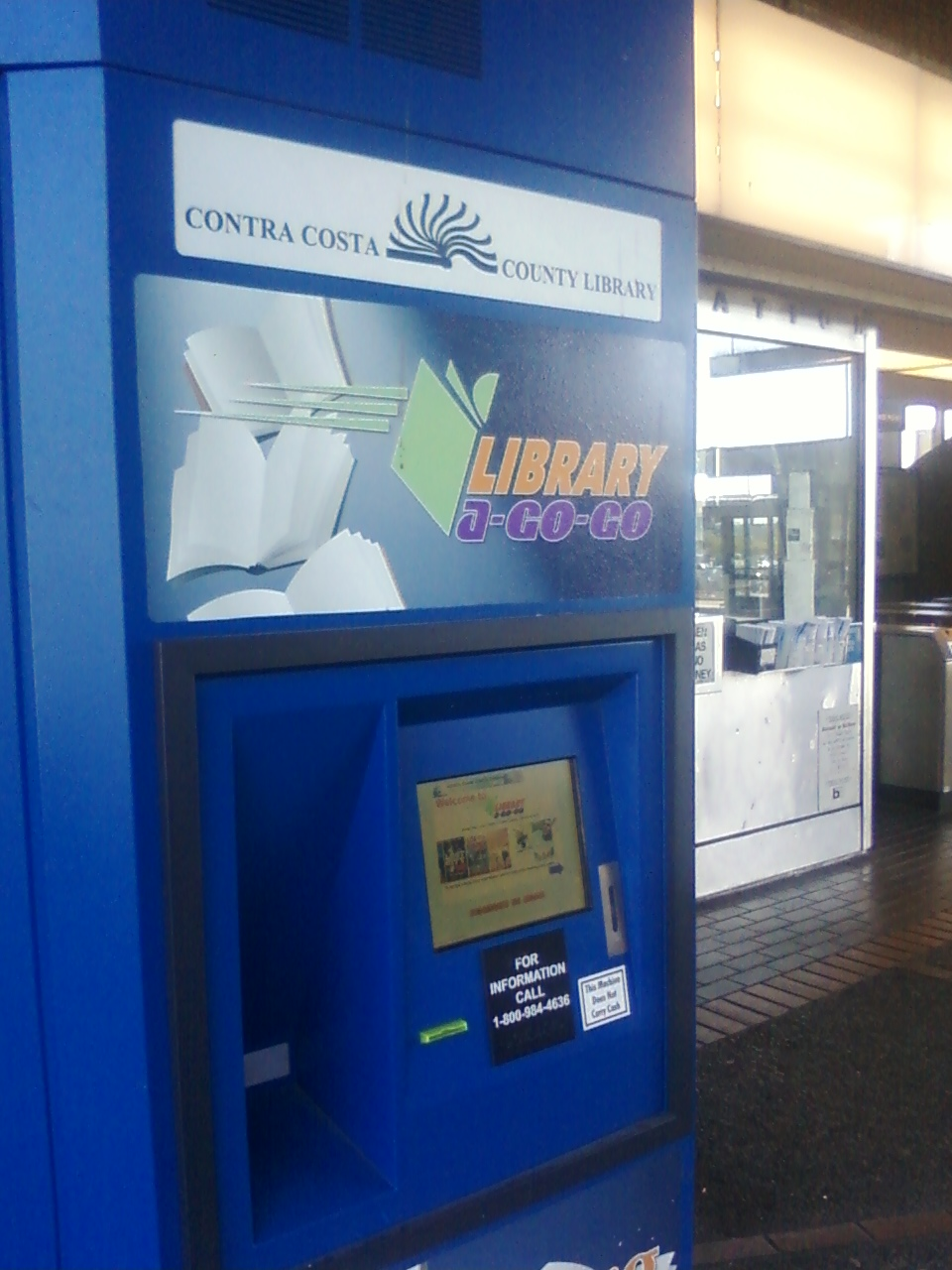
A Library-A-Go-Go machine at the El Cerrito del Norte BART station and transit hub in California

GoLibrary or Library-a-Go-Go (Swedish: Bokomaten) is a book lending machine used by libraries in Sweden and the U.S. state of California. The Contra Costa Library was the body that first brought these machines to the United States.

== History ==
External image
- A young woman holding a book next to a bokomaten machine in Sweden

The machines were developed by the Swedish company Distec and have been used in Stockholm for several years. They were introduced in California and was first used on the Bay Area Rapid Transit system at its Pittsburg/Bay Point, El Cerrito del Norte, and Millbrae Stations. The Pittsburg and El Cerrito machines are operated by the Contra Costa Public Library System. That library also has a machine at Sandy Cove Shopping Center in Discovery Bay, California, a town without a local library. The machine in Millbrae is operated by the Peninsula Library System.

The Yuba County Library, which has only one outlet and a bookmobile, plans to add a GoLibrary machine as well. There are also initiatives that adopted the GoLibrary framework but using the virtual platform such as the project launched by the national library of Singapore. A similar trend was introduced in Denmark but it involves live books and local experts that can be "checked out" for 30 minutes at a time. The experts can discuss all aspects of a subject matter with individuals or groups.
