= 2018 Pacific Association season =

- League: Pacific Association
- Sport: Baseball
- Duration: May 31 – August 31 (Playoffs: September 1 – September 2)
- Games: 80 (240 games in total)
- Teams: 6

Regular season
- Season champions: Sonoma Stompers

League postseason
- Finals champions: San Rafael Pacifics
- Runners-up: Sonoma Stompers

PACA seasons
- ← 2017 2019 →

The 2018 Pacific Association season was the sixth season of the Pacific Association. There was a six team 80 game schedule. Most series included a two-game series with each team having 40 home games.

The Vallejo Admirals entered the season as defending champions, having defeated the Sonoma Stompers 11–8 in the league's 2017 championship game.

The playoffs concluded on September 2, with the San Rafael Pacifics defeating the Sonoma Stompers 6–0 in the championship game, winning their third Pacific Association championship.

== Team and rule changes ==
The Napa Silverados and Martinez Clippers were both added as new franchises.

The top four teams would qualify for the 2018 playoffs with two best of one series to determine the champion.

== Regular season standings ==
as of August 31, 2018

Regular Season Standings
Pos	Team	G	W	L	Pct.	GB
1	y – Sonoma Stompers	80	57	23	.713	--
2	x – San Rafael Pacifics	80	50	30	.625	7.0
3	x – Vallejo Admirals	80	37	43	.463	20.0
4	x – Pittsburg Diamonds	80	36	44	.450	21.0
5	e – Napa Silverados	80	31	49	.388	26.0
6	e – Martinez Clippers	80	29	51	.363	28.0

- y – Clinched division
- x – Clinched playoff spot
- e – Eliminated from playoff contention

=== Record vs. opponents ===
2018 Pacific Association Record vs. opponents
Team	MTZ	NAPA	PIT	SRF	SON	VAL
Martinez	—	8–8	8–8	5–11	4–12	4–12
Napa	8–8	—	6–10	6–10	3–13	8–8
Pittsburg	8–8	10–6	—	6–10	4–12	8–8
San Rafael	11–5	10–6	10–6	—	8–8	11–5
Sonoma	12–4	13–3	12–4	8–8	—	12–4
Vallejo	12–4	8–8	8–8	5–11	4–12	—

== Statistical leaders ==
=== Hitting ===
Stat	Player	Team	Total
HR	Nick Akins	Vallejo Admirals	29
AVG	Javion Randle	San Rafael Pacifics	.402
RBIs	Nick Akins	Vallejo Admirals	81
SB	DonAndre Clark, Nick Kern	San Rafael Pacifics, Napa Silverados	31

=== Pitching ===
Stat	Player	Team	Total
W	Jared Koenig	San Rafael Pacifics	11
ERA	Tyler Sharp	Sonoma Stompers	2.90
SO	Jared Koenig	San Rafael Pacifics	140
SV	Jacob Cox	Sonoma Stompers	26

To qualify as league leader for hitter, AVG - Minimum of plate appearances of 2.7 per team game. To qualify as league leader for pitcher, ERA - Minimum inning(s) of .8 pitched per team game.

== Playoffs ==
=== Format ===
In 2018, The top four teams would qualify for the playoffs. The number one and two seeds would host a best-of-one semi-final game. The lowest seeded team would then host a best-of-one championship game. The playoffs were held September 1 through September 2.

Semi-final Game
4	Pittsburg Diamonds	0
1	Sonoma Stompers	5
3	Vallejo Admirals	2
2	San Rafael Pacifics	3

Championship Game
2	San Rafael Pacifics	6
1	Sonoma Stompers	0

=== Individual Awards ===
Award	Player	Team
Most Valuable Player	Javion Randle	San Rafael Pacifics
Pitcher of the Year	Jared Koenig	San Rafael Pacifics
Reliever of the Year	Jacob Cox	Sonoma Stompers
Rookie of the Year	Kenny Meimerstorf	Sonoma Stompers
Manager of the Year	Zack Pace	Sonoma Stompers
Executive of the Year	Brett Creamer	Sonoma Stompers

=== Gilded Glove Awards ===
Position	Player	Team
C	Daniel Comstock	Sonoma Stompers
1B	Josh Montelongo	Napa Silverados
2B	Brandon Fischer	Vallejo Admirals
SS	Rando Moreno	San Rafael Pacifics
3B	Chris Fornaci	Vallejo Admirals
LF	Javion Randle	San Rafael Pacifics
CF	DonAndre Clark	San Rafael Pacifics
RF	Vladmimir Gomez	Vallejo Admirals
P	Billy Felo	Napa Silverados

== Notable players ==
Former Major League Baseball players who played in the Pacific Association in 2018

- Travis Blackley (Pittsburg)
- J. P. Howell (San Rafael)
- Jared Koenig (San Rafael)
- Chris Mazza (San Rafael)

Other notable players who played in the Pacific Association in 2018

- Jose Casilla (San Rafael)
- Chris Kwitzer (Pittsburg)
- D. J. Sharabi (Sonoma)
