= Martinez Clippers =

Defunct professional baseball team

Information
- League: Pacific Association of Professional Baseball Clubs
- Location: Martinez, California
- Ballpark: Joe DiMaggio Fields at Waterfront Park
- Founded: 2018
- Colors
- Ownership: Jeff and Paulette Carpoff
- General manager: Elizabeth Martin
- Manager: Dan Parker
- Website: www.mtzclippers.com

The Martinez Clippers were a professional baseball team based in Martinez, California, United States, as members of the Pacific Association of Professional Baseball Clubs, an independent professional baseball circuit not affiliated with Major League Baseball. The team was named for New York Yankee Joe DiMaggio, who was nicknamed "The Yankee Clipper" and was born in Martinez.

== History ==
On February 8, 2018, the Pacific Association of Professional Baseball Clubs announced the additions of the Napa Silverados and Martinez Clippers for the upcoming summer season.

On April 22, 2018, the Clippers signed their first pitcher, Zach Compton. The team participated in its first draft the next day. After struggling to start the season at 7-30, manager Chris Decker was replaced by former Houston Astros prospect Daniel Parker who finished the season 22-21 as manager. Former Major League Baseball player Bart Zeller served as the team's bench coach. Their top hitters were 3B Alan Mocahbee (.332/.443/.635, 19 HR, 67 RBI in 68 G) and 2B Shaine Hughes (.331/.430/.576) while Robert Humes (1-2, 6 Sv, 2.77) was their top hurler.

In December 2018, Clippers' owners Jeff and Paulette Carpoff were reported to be in charge of a Ponzi scheme based around their primary company DC Solar Inc. and were being investigated by the FBI. In response, the city of Martinez canceled the Clippers' lease at the stadium. The Carpoffs pled guilty to wire fraud and money laundering in January 2020, forfeiting $120 million in assets. Four other business partners pled guilty to crimes.

The Pacific Association commissioner stated that they hoped to keep the Clippers as members of the league under new ownership.

As of 2022 there has been no update on the future of the Pacific Association following the announcement of the cancellation of the 2020 season.

== Season-by-season results ==
Martinez Clippers
Season	Overall	Win %	Standing	Manager	Postseason
2018	29–51	.363	6th	Chris Decker (7–30); Daniel Parker (22–21)	Did not qualify
Totals	29–51	.363	—	—	—
