= Martinez, California =

City in California, United States

- City
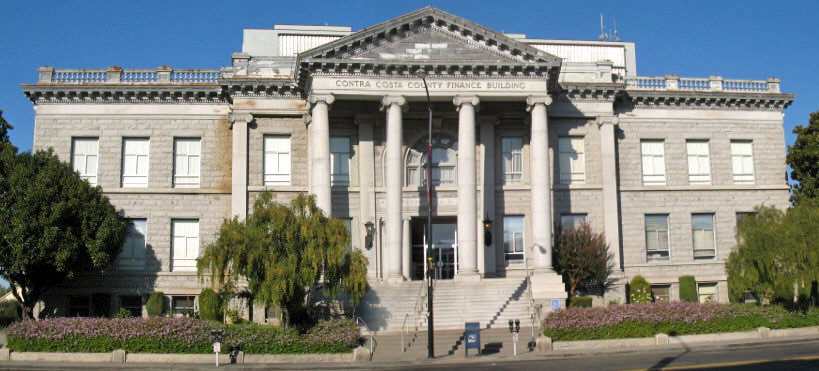
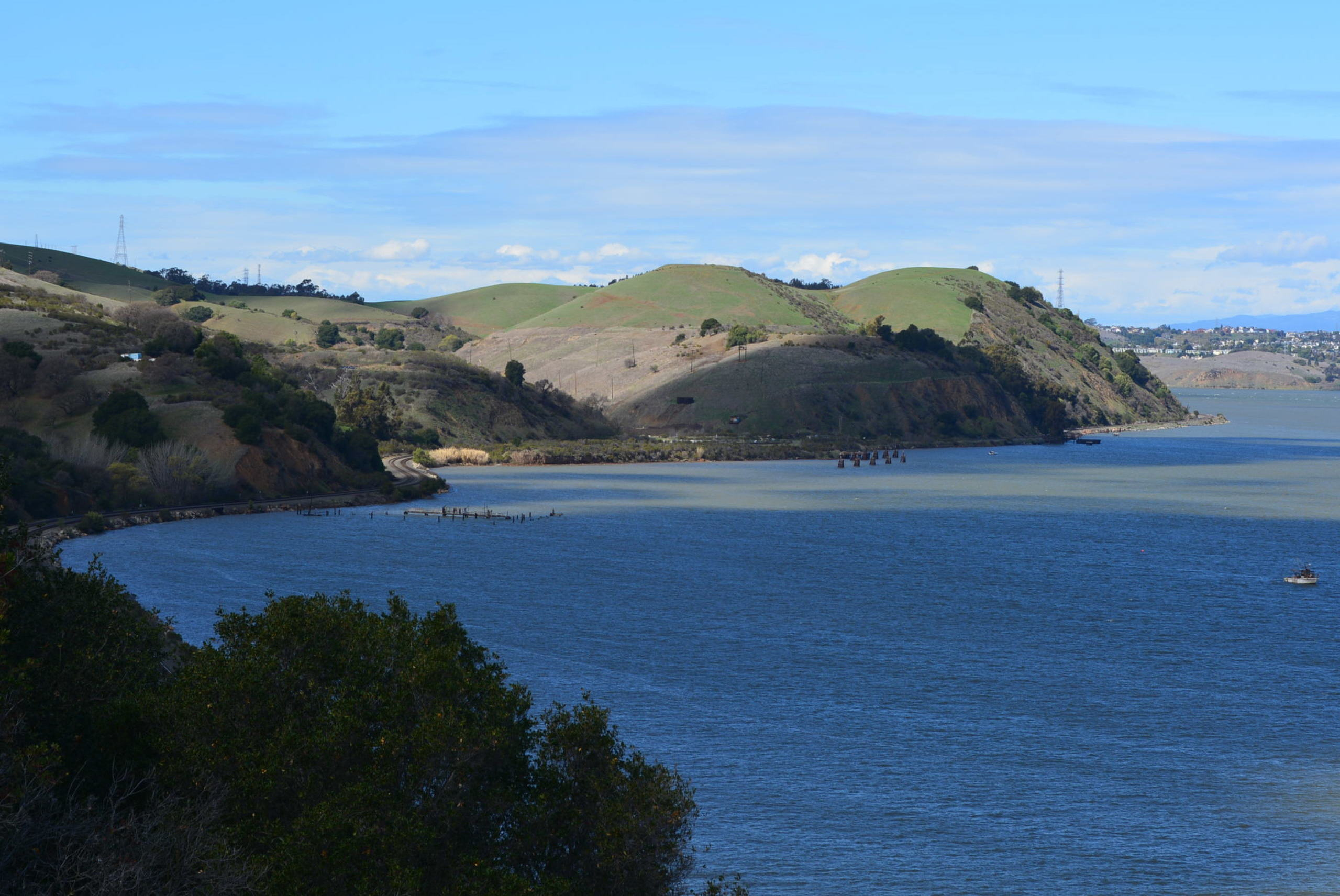
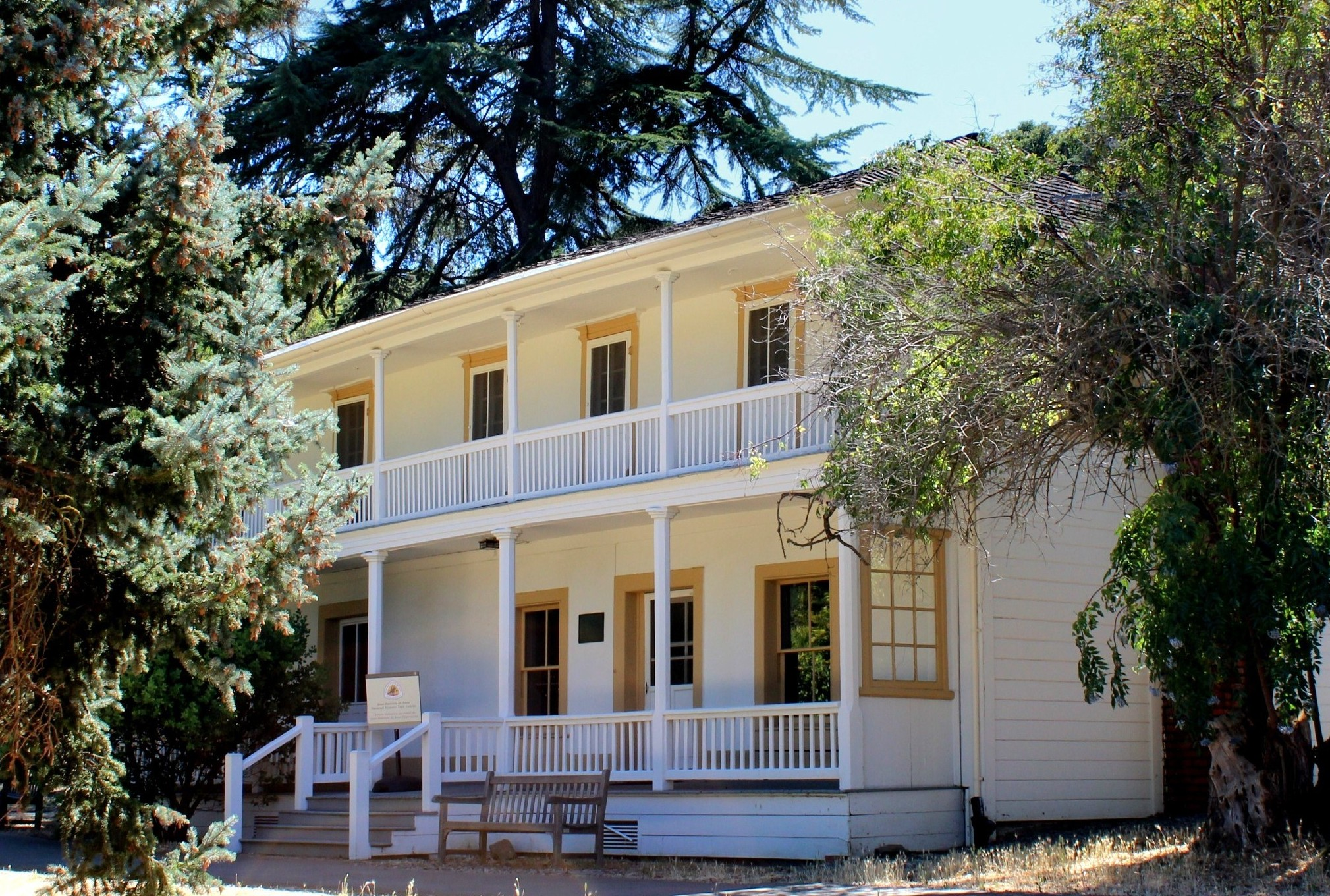
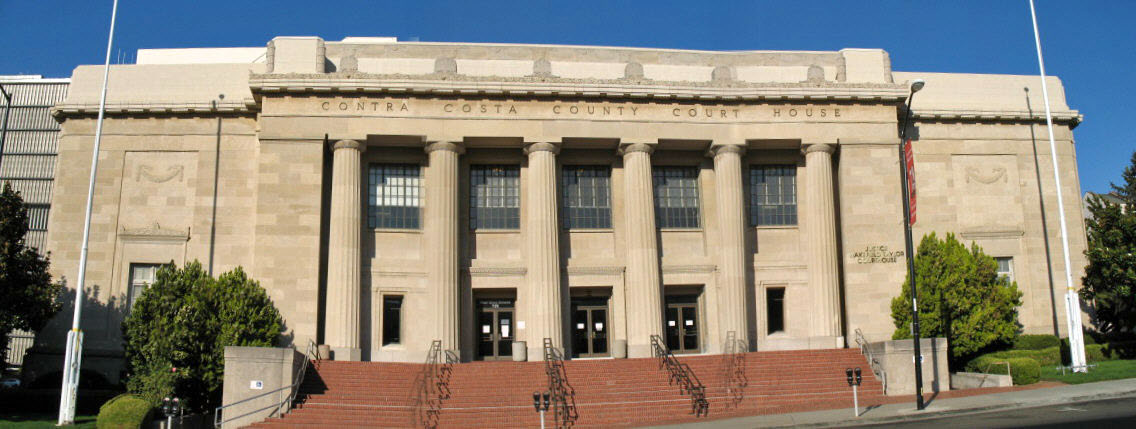
- Contra Costa County Finance Building Carquinez Strait Regional Shoreline Vicente Martínez Adobe Contra Costa County Courthouse

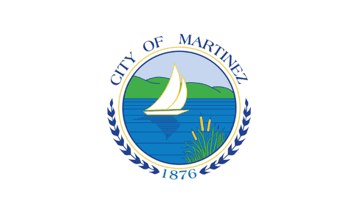
- Flag
- Nickname: The Bay Area's Hidden Gem (official)
- Interactive map of Martinez, California
- Location in the United States Martinez (California) Martinez (the United States)
- Coordinates: 38°01′10″N 122°08′03″W
- Country: United States
- State: California
- County: Contra Costa
- Incorporated: April 1, 1876

Government
  - Mayor: Brianne Zorn (term ends in December 2026)
  - State senator: Tim Grayson (D)
  - Assemblymember: Anamarie Avila Farias (D)
  - United States representatives: John Garamendi (D) and Mark DeSaulnier (D)

Area
  - Total: 13.63 sq mi (35.31 km^{2})
  - Land: 12.63 sq mi (32.71 km^{2})
  - Water: 1.00 sq mi (2.60 km^{2}) 7.36%
- Elevation: 23 ft (7 m)

Population (2020)
  - Total: 37,287
  - Density: 2,952/sq mi (1,140/km^{2})
- Time zone: UTC-8 (Pacific)
  - Summer (DST): UTC-7 (PDT)
- ZIP code: 94553
- Area code: 925
- FIPS code: 06-46114
- GNIS feature IDs: 277553, 2411045
- Website: Official website

Martinez (Spanish: Martínez) is a city in and the county seat of Contra Costa County, California, United States, in the East Bay region of the San Francisco Bay Area. Located on the southern shore of the Carquinez Strait, the city's population was 37,287 at the 2020 census. The city is named after Californio ranchero Ygnacio Martínez, having been founded on his Rancho El Pinole. Martinez is known for its historic center and its waterfront.

== History ==
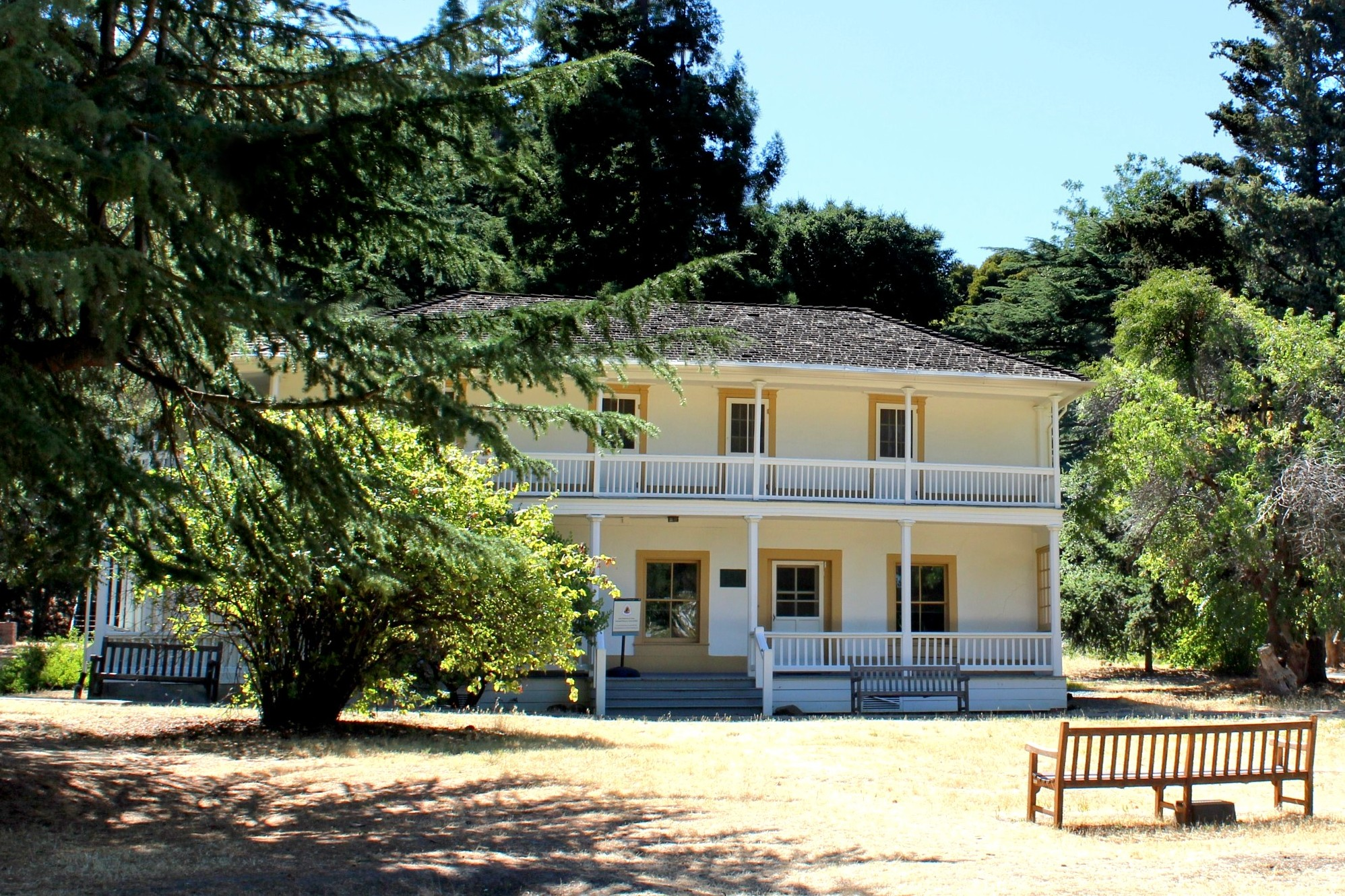
The Vicente Martínez Adobe, built in 1849 by a son of Ygnacio Martínez, is the oldest building in Martinez.

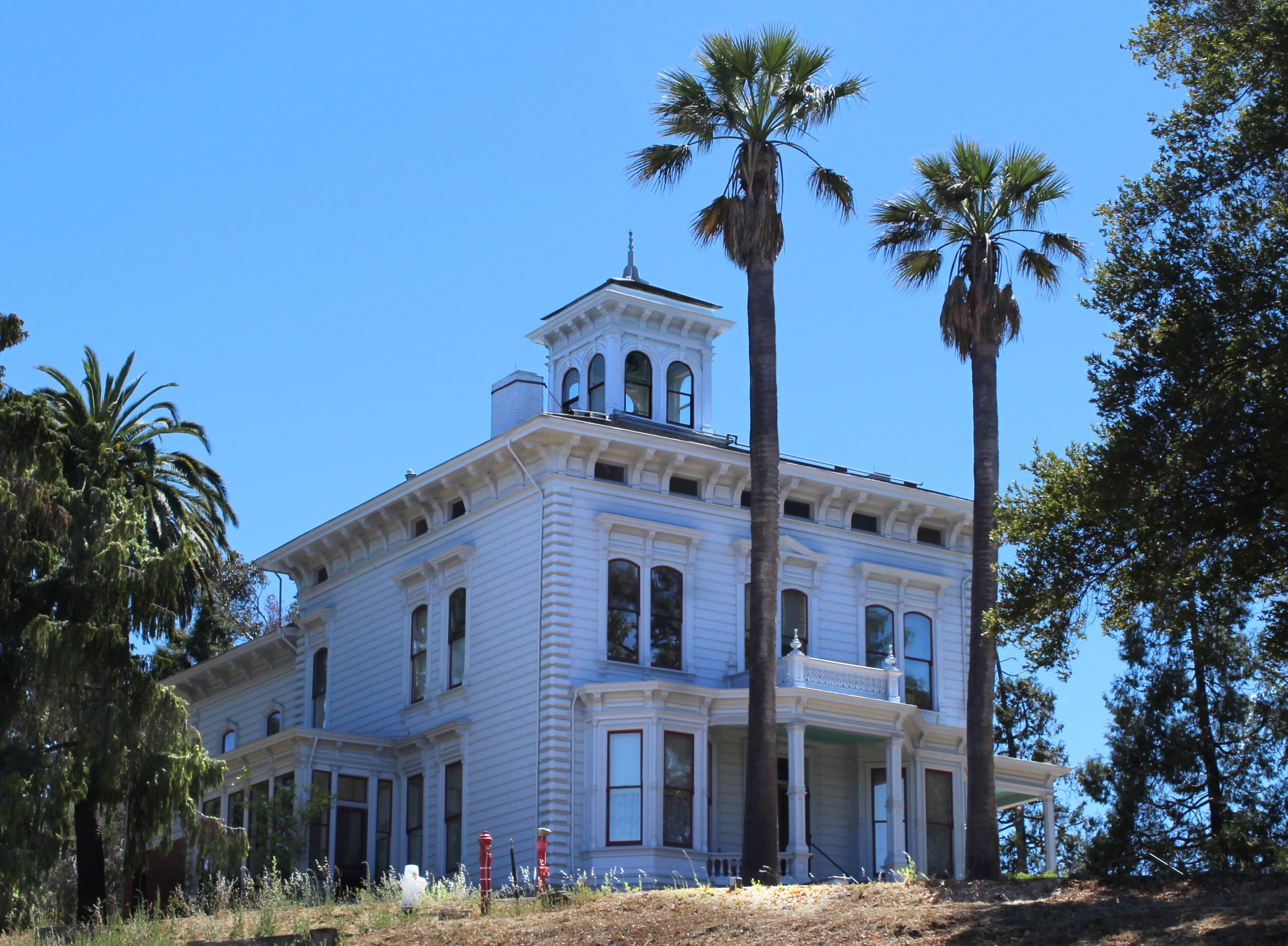
The John Muir National Historic Site, home of famed naturalist John Muir from 1880 until his death in 1914

The lush Alhambra Valley is believed to have been a seasonal “pantry” used for foraging by the local population of the Karkines Indians. The Karkines are a part of the Ohlone (Costanoan) Indian group.

In 1824, the western side of Martinez, Alhambra Valley was included in the Rancho El Pinole Mexican land grant to Ygnacio Martínez. East of these lands was the Rancho Las Juntas, a grant made to Irish born William Welch in 1844; his land lay between the lands of Martinez and Pacheco.

In 1847, Dr. Robert Semple contracted to provide ferry service from Martinez to Benicia, which for many years was the only crossing on the Carquinez Strait. By 1849, Martínez served as a way station for the California Gold Rush. The town was laid out in 1849 by Col. William M. Smith and named for Martinez. It became the county seat in 1850, but could not incorporate at the time because it lacked the 200 registered voters required, and would not become a city until 1876.

Martinez was the home of naturalist John Muir from 1880 until his death in 1914. He was buried about a mile south of the building that is now the John Muir National Historic Site. Also nearby is the Vicente Martinez Adobe, built in 1849 by the son of Ygnacio Martinez.

The first post office opened in 1851.

In 1860, Martinez played a role in the Pony Express, where riders would take the ferry from Benicia (particularly if they missed the steamer in Sacramento).

The first oil refinery in the Martinez area was built in 1904 at Bull's Head Point, a then-unincorporated waterfront area two miles east of the downtown district. That area soon became known as Mococo, following the 1905 arrival of a smelting works, operated by the Mountain Copper Company (Mo Co Co).

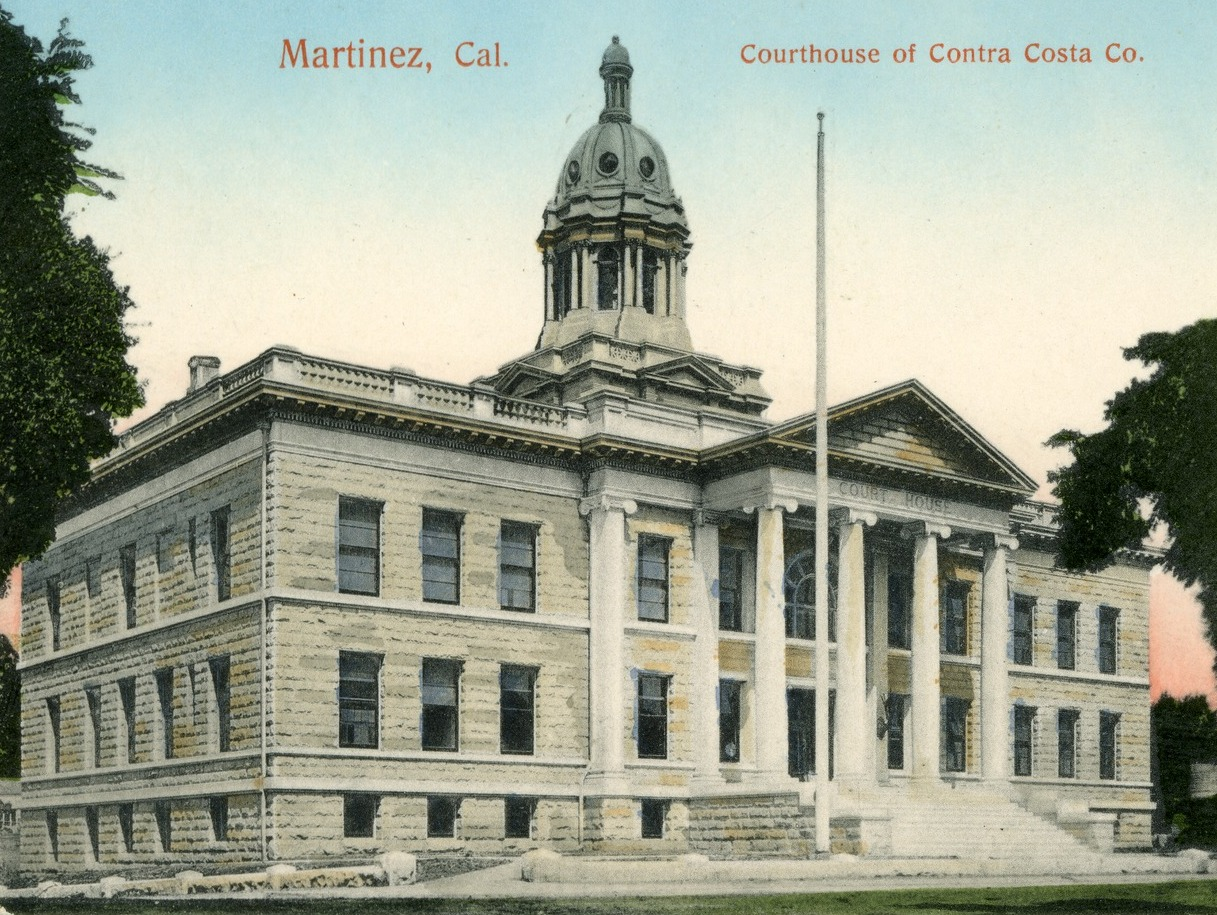
The historic Contra Costa County Courthouse was built in 1901.

That first facility, operated by the Bull's Head Oil Company, was followed in 1908 by a test refinery built by the Pacific Coast Oil Company. Shortly thereafter, Pacific Coast became part of Standard Oil (now Chevron), and consolidated their oil refining operations in the Point Richmond, Hercules, Rodeo waterfront corridor some 12 miles (19 km) to the west of Martinez.

In 1913, the Golden Eagle facility became the third oil refinery to be built in the area. It was located in the newly created company town of Avon, immediately to the East of Martinez. A fourth refinery, built by the Shell Oil Company on land adjacent to the Martinez City limits, went online in January 1916. The Shell Oil refining facility is still operational today (Currently owned by PBF Energy), maintaining the city's position as a significant petroleum processing center. The Golden Eagle Refinery (currently owned by Marathon Petroleum Company) was idled in April 2020 as a response to lower petroleum demand during the COVID-19 pandemic.

Folk etymology in Martinez claims the invention of the Martini cocktail and that it is named for the city.

== Geography ==
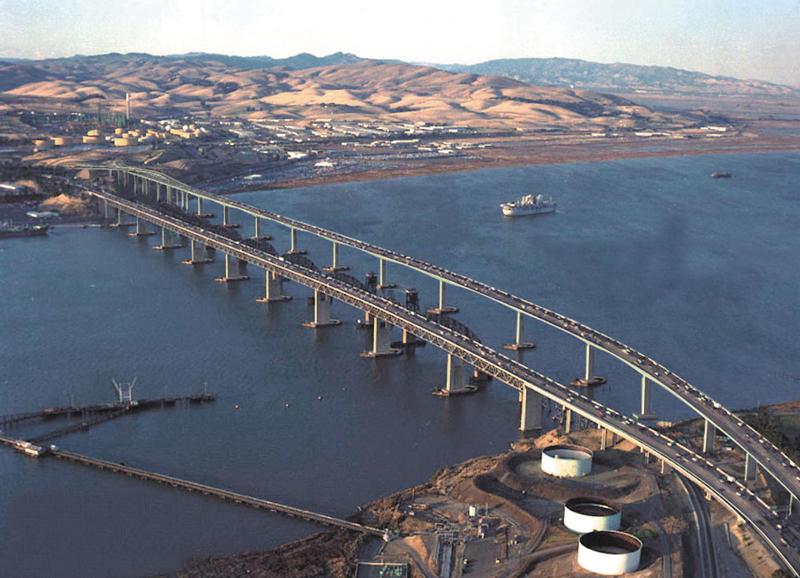
The Benicia-Martinez Bridge, which crosses the Carquinez Strait, connects Martinez in the south to Benicia in the north (top).

According to the United States Census Bureau, the city has a total area of 13.6 square miles (35 km^{2}), of which 1.0 square mile (2.6 km^{2}) (7.36 percent) is covered by water.

The city is largely surrounded by water and regional open-space preserves. The Martinez–Benicia Bridge carries Highway 680 across the eastern end of the Carquinez Strait to Solano County. The city is a densely built downtown valley threaded by Alhambra Creek and north of Highway 4. Suburban areas stretch south of Highway 4 to join the neighboring city of Pleasant Hill. Unincorporated areas include the rural Alhambra Valley and the Franklin Canyon area.

The Martinez Regional Shoreline bounds the city to the north along the Carquinez Strait. Carquinez Strait Regional Shoreline includes the Franklin Hills west of downtown, stretching west to the unincorporated community of Port Costa and the town of Crockett. Briones Regional Park borders the Alhambra Valley to the south. Waterbird Regional Preserve and the McNabney Marsh border the city and Highway 680 to the east. Martinez's location at the east end of the Carquinez Strait as it widens to Suisun Bay includes dramatic water views stretching to the Sierra range. Views from surrounding ridge tops stretch to nearby Mount Diablo, Mount Saint Helena, Mount Tamalpais, and others.

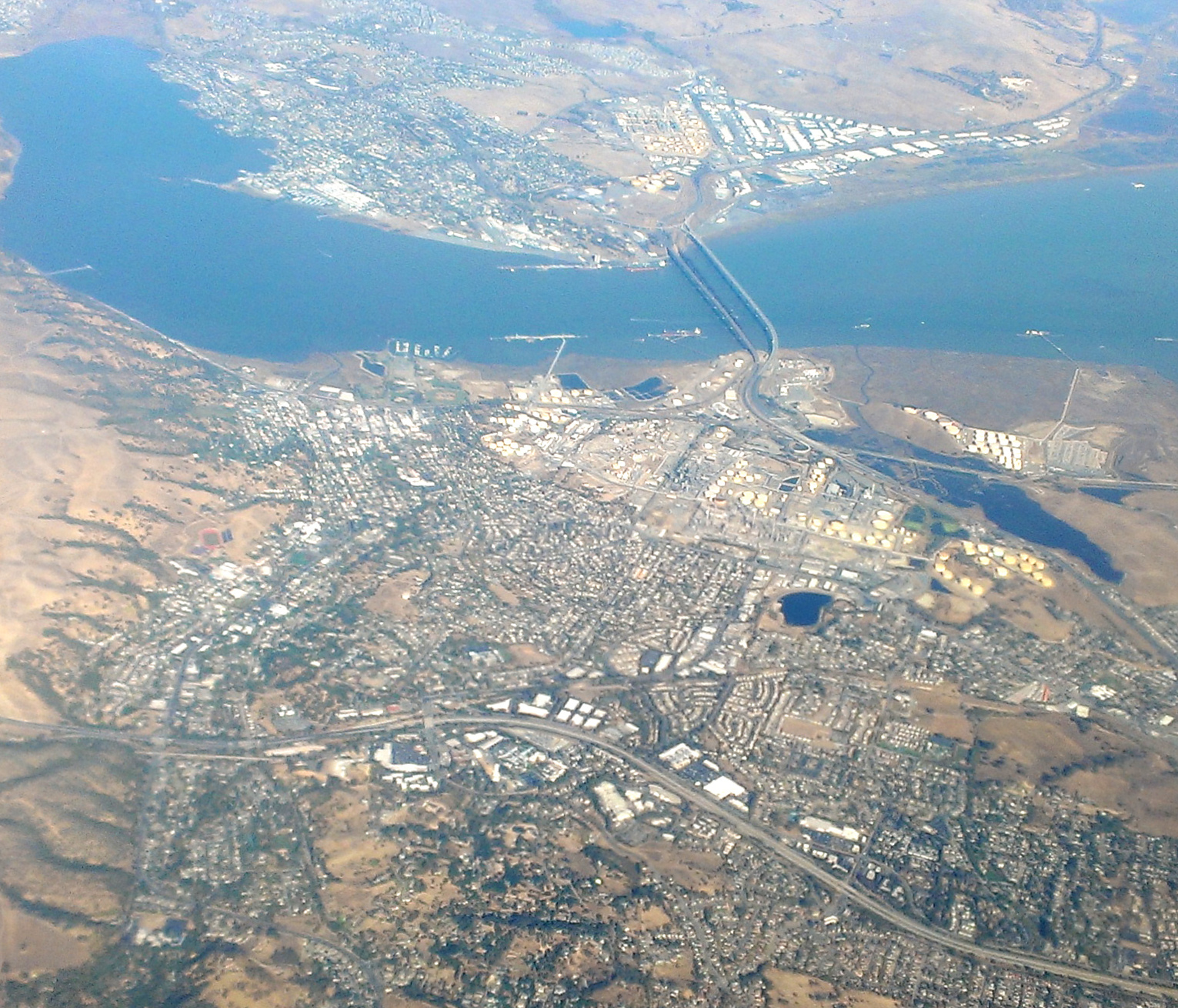
Aerial view of Martinez (bottom); Benicia is located across the Carquinez Strait (top).

Martinez is one of the only two places in the Bay Area, the other being Golden Gate Bridge, where the Bay Area Ridge Trail and the San Francisco Bay Trail converge. The Bay Trail is a planned recreational corridor that, when complete, will encircle San Francisco and San Pablo bays with a continuous 400-mile (640 km) network of bicycling and hiking trails. It will connect the shoreline of all nine Bay Area counties, link 47 cities, and cross the major toll bridges in the region, including the Benicia–Martinez Bridge. To date, approximately 240 miles (390 km) of the alignment—over half the Bay Trail's ultimate length—have been completed. The Bay Area Ridge Trail ultimately will be a 500+ mile trail encircling the San Francisco Bay along the ridge tops, open to hikers, equestrians, mountain bicyclists, and outdoor enthusiasts of all types. So far, over 300 miles (480 km) of trail have been dedicated for use. East Bay Regional Park District's Iron Horse Regional Trail will join the Bay Trail along the waterfront, and the Contra Costa Canal Trail threads through the city from Pleasant Hill to the south.

=== Climate ===
Martinez has a mild Mediterranean climate (Köppen climate classification: Csa/b). Summers are warm and dry, with some morning fog during sea breezes. The maritime influence is much less significant than in other parts of the Bay Area that are closer to the Pacific, which causes very high daytime averages compared to San Francisco and Oakland in summer. However, nights normally cool off significantly, which results in daytime highs around 87 °F (31 °C) and nighttime lows of 55 °F (13 °C) during July and August. Winters are wet and cool with occasional frost. The majority of the city is within a USDA hardiness zone of 9b.

Climate data for Martinez, California
Month	Jan	Feb	Mar	Apr	May	Jun	Jul	Aug	Sep	Oct	Nov	Dec	Year
Record high °F (°C)	74 (23)	80 (27)	88 (31)	98 (37)	104 (40)	110 (43)	115 (46)	107 (42)	108 (42)	103 (39)	82 (28)	74 (23)	115 (46)
Mean daily maximum °F (°C)	55.2 (12.9)	60.9 (16.1)	66.0 (18.9)	71.7 (22.1)	78.9 (26.1)	85.3 (29.6)	89.0 (31.7)	88.1 (31.2)	84.9 (29.4)	76.4 (24.7)	64.0 (17.8)	55.6 (13.1)	73.0 (22.8)
Daily mean °F (°C)	46.9 (8.3)	51.2 (10.7)	55.1 (12.8)	58.7 (14.8)	64.2 (17.9)	69.3 (20.7)	71.7 (22.1)	71.2 (21.8)	69.1 (20.6)	62.6 (17.0)	53.6 (12.0)	47.1 (8.4)	60.1 (15.6)
Mean daily minimum °F (°C)	38.6 (3.7)	41.4 (5.2)	44.1 (6.7)	45.7 (7.6)	49.5 (9.7)	53.2 (11.8)	54.5 (12.5)	54.3 (12.4)	53.3 (11.8)	48.9 (9.4)	43.2 (6.2)	38.5 (3.6)	47.1 (8.4)
Record low °F (°C)	20 (−7)	25 (−4)	29 (−2)	29 (−2)	34 (1)	31 (−1)	41 (5)	42 (6)	40 (4)	34 (1)	25 (−4)	19 (−7)	19 (−7)
Average precipitation inches (mm)	3.93 (100)	3.61 (92)	2.92 (74)	1.20 (30)	0.47 (12)	0.10 (2.5)	0.02 (0.51)	0.05 (1.3)	0.18 (4.6)	0.95 (24)	2.52 (64)	3.44 (87)	19.39 (491.91)
Average precipitation days (≥ 0.01 in)	11	10	9	6	3	1	0	0	1	3	8	10	62
Source: Western Regional Climate Center

== Demographics ==
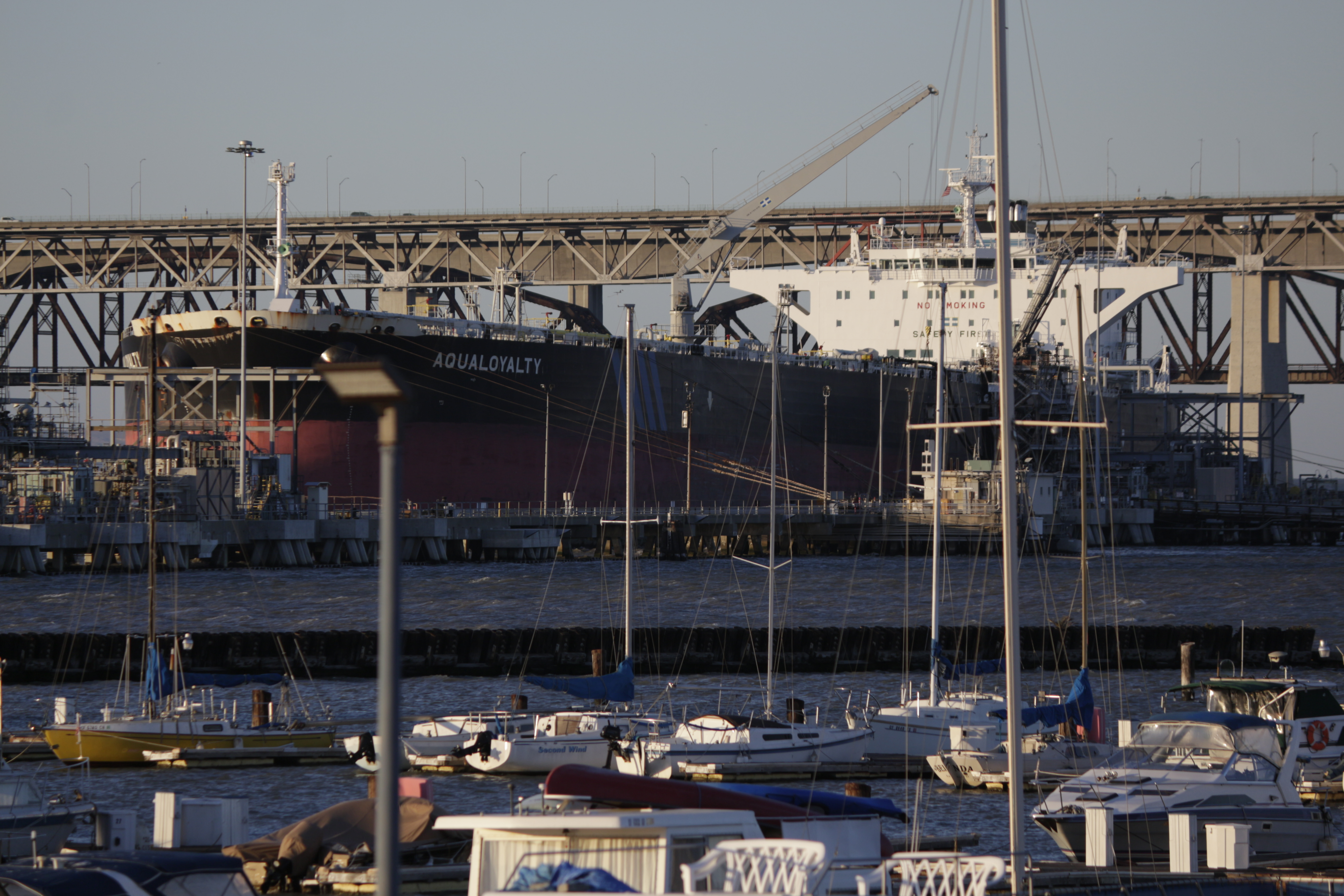
View from the Martinez Marina

Historical population
Census	Pop.	Note	%±
1870	560		—
1890	1,609		—
1900	1,380		−14.2%
1910	2,115		53.3%
1920	3,858		82.4%
1930	6,569		70.3%
1940	7,381		12.4%
1950	8,268		12.0%
1960	9,604		16.2%
1970	16,506		71.9%
1980	22,582		36.8%
1990	31,808		40.9%
2000	35,866		12.8%
2010	35,824		−0.1%
2020	37,287		4.1%
U.S. Decennial Census

=== 2020 census ===
As of the 2020 census, Martinez had a population of 37,287. The median age was 42.9 years. 19.3% of residents were under the age of 18 and 18.3% of residents were 65 years of age or older. For every 100 females there were 95.1 males, and for every 100 females age 18 and over there were 92.8 males age 18 and over.

99.8% of residents lived in urban areas, while 0.2% lived in rural areas.

There were 14,851 households in Martinez, of which 28.5% had children under the age of 18 living in them. Of all households, 49.3% were married-couple households, 15.8% were households with a male householder and no spouse or partner present, and 27.9% were households with a female householder and no spouse or partner present. About 27.3% of all households were made up of individuals and 12.0% had someone living alone who was 65 years of age or older.

There were 15,360 housing units, of which 3.3% were vacant. The homeowner vacancy rate was 0.6% and the rental vacancy rate was 4.3%.

Racial composition as of the 2020 census
Race	Number	Percent
White	24,191	64.9%
Black or African American	1,390	3.7%
American Indian and Alaska Native	264	0.7%
Asian	3,828	10.3%
Native Hawaiian and Other Pacific Islander	117	0.3%
Some other race	2,050	5.5%
Two or more races	5,447	14.6%
Hispanic or Latino (of any race)	6,670	17.9%

=== 2023 estimate ===
In 2023, the US Census Bureau estimated that the median household income was $125,436, and the per capita income was $62,336. About 4.0% of families and 6.7% of the population were below the poverty line.

=== 2010 census ===
The 2010 United States Census reported that Martinez had a population of 35,824. The population density was 2,727.4 people per square mile (1,053.1/km²). The racial makeup of Martinez was 27,603 (77.1%) White, 1,303 (3.6%) African American, 255 (0.7%) Native American, 2,876 (8.0%) Asian, 121 (0.3%) Pacific Islander, 1,425 (4.0%) from other races, and 2,241 (6.3%) from two or more races. Hispanic or Latino of any race were 5,258 persons (14.7 percent).

The Census reported that 34,528 people (96.4 percent of the population) lived in households, 235 (0.7 percent) lived in non-institutionalized group quarters, and 1,061 (3.0 percent) were institutionalized.

There were 14,287 households, out of which 4,273 (29.9 percent) had children under the age of 18 living in them, 6,782 (47.5 percent) were opposite-sex married couples living together, 1,751 (12.3 percent) had a female householder with no husband present, 640 (4.5 percent) had a male householder with no wife present. There were 928 (6.5 percent) unmarried opposite-sex partnerships, and 137 (1.0 percent) same-sex married couples or partnerships. 3,920 households (27.4 percent) were made up of individuals and 1,078 (7.5 percent) had someone living alone who was 65 years of age or older. The average household size was 2.42. There were 9,173 families (64.2 percent of all households); the average family size was 2.95.

The age distribution of the population showed 7,329 people (20.5 percent) under the age of 18, 2,842 people (7.9 percent) aged 18 to 24, 9,193 people (25.7 percent) aged 25 to 44, 12,121 people (33.8 percent) aged 45 to 64, and 4,339 people (12.1 percent) who were 65 years of age or older. The median age was 42.2 years. For every 100 females, there were 96.9 males. For every 100 females age 18 and over, there were 94.8 males.

There were 14,976 housing units at an average density of 1,140.2 per square mile (440.2/km²), of which 14,287 were occupied, of which 9,619 (67.3 percent) were owner-occupied, and 4,668 (32.7 percent) were occupied by renters. The homeowner vacancy rate was 1.4 percent; the rental vacancy rate was 4.9 percent. 23,876 people (66.6 percent of the population) lived in owner-occupied housing units and 10,652 people (29.7 percent) lived in rental housing units.

Demographic profile	2010
Total Population	35,824 – 100.0 %
One Race	33,583 – 93.7%
Not Hispanic or Latino	30,566 – 85.3%
White alone	24,604 – 68.7%
Black or African American alone	1,263 – 3.5%
American Indian and Alaska Native alone	163 – 0.5%
Asian alone	2,810 – 7.8%
Native Hawaiian and Other Pacific Islander alone	99 – 0.3%
Some other race alone	67 – 0.2%
Two or more races alone	1,560 – 4.4%
Hispanic or Latino (of any race)	5,258 – 14.7%

=== 2000 census ===
As of the census of 2000, there were 35,866 people, 14,300 households, and 9,209 families residing in the city. The population density was 2,927.6 people per square mile (1,130.4/km²). There were 14,597 housing units at an average density of 1,191.5/sq mi (460.1/km²). The racial makeup of the city was 81.03 percent White, 3.35 percent Black or African American, 0.74 percent Native American, 6.63 percent Asian, 0.23 percent Pacific Islander, 3.29 percent from other races, and 4.72 percent from two or more races. 10.20 percent of the population were Hispanic or Latino of any race. 11.7 percent claimed to be of German, 10.8 percent Irish, 10.2 percent Italian, 9.4 percent English and 5.4 percent American ancestry.

There were 14,300 households out of which 30.0 percent had children under the age of 18 living with them, 49.4 percent were married couples living together, 11.0 percent had a female householder with no husband present, and 35.6 percent were non-families. 27.4 percent of all households were made up of individuals and 6.9 percent had someone living alone who was 65 years of age or older. The average household size was 2.41 and the average family size was 2.96.

In the city, the age distribution of the population showed 22.7 percent under the age of 18, 7.3 percent from 18 to 24, 32.6 percent from 25 to 44, 27.3 percent from 45 to 64, and 10.1 percent who were 65 years of age or older. The median age was 39 years. For every 100 females, there were 98.5 males. For every 100 females age 18 and over, there were 96.0 males.

The median income for a household in the city was $63,010, and the median income for a family was $77,411 (these figures had risen to $73,668 and $92,486 respectively as of a 2007 estimate). Males had a median income of $52,135 versus $40,714 for females. The per capita income for the city was $29,701. About 3.2 percent of families and 5.2 percent of the population were below the poverty line, including 3.9 percent of those under age 18 and 4.8 percent of those age 65 or over.

The languages spoken were 88 percent English, 6 percent Spanish, 2 percent Tagalog, 1 percent German, 1 percent Chinese, 0.5 percent Italian, 0.5 percent Persian, 0.3 percent Korean, 0.3 percent Portuguese, 0.3 percent Russian, 0.3 percent Arabic, 0.2 percent Dutch, 0.2 percent Polish, 0.2 percent French, 0.2 percent Punjabi, 0.2 percent Vietnamese, 0.1 percent Japanese, 0.1 percent Tamil, 0.1 percent Cantonese. Of the 4,176 people who did not use English as their primary language 3,663 (87.7 percent) spoke it well or very well while 513 (12.3 percent) spoke it "not well" or "not at all"

== Economy ==
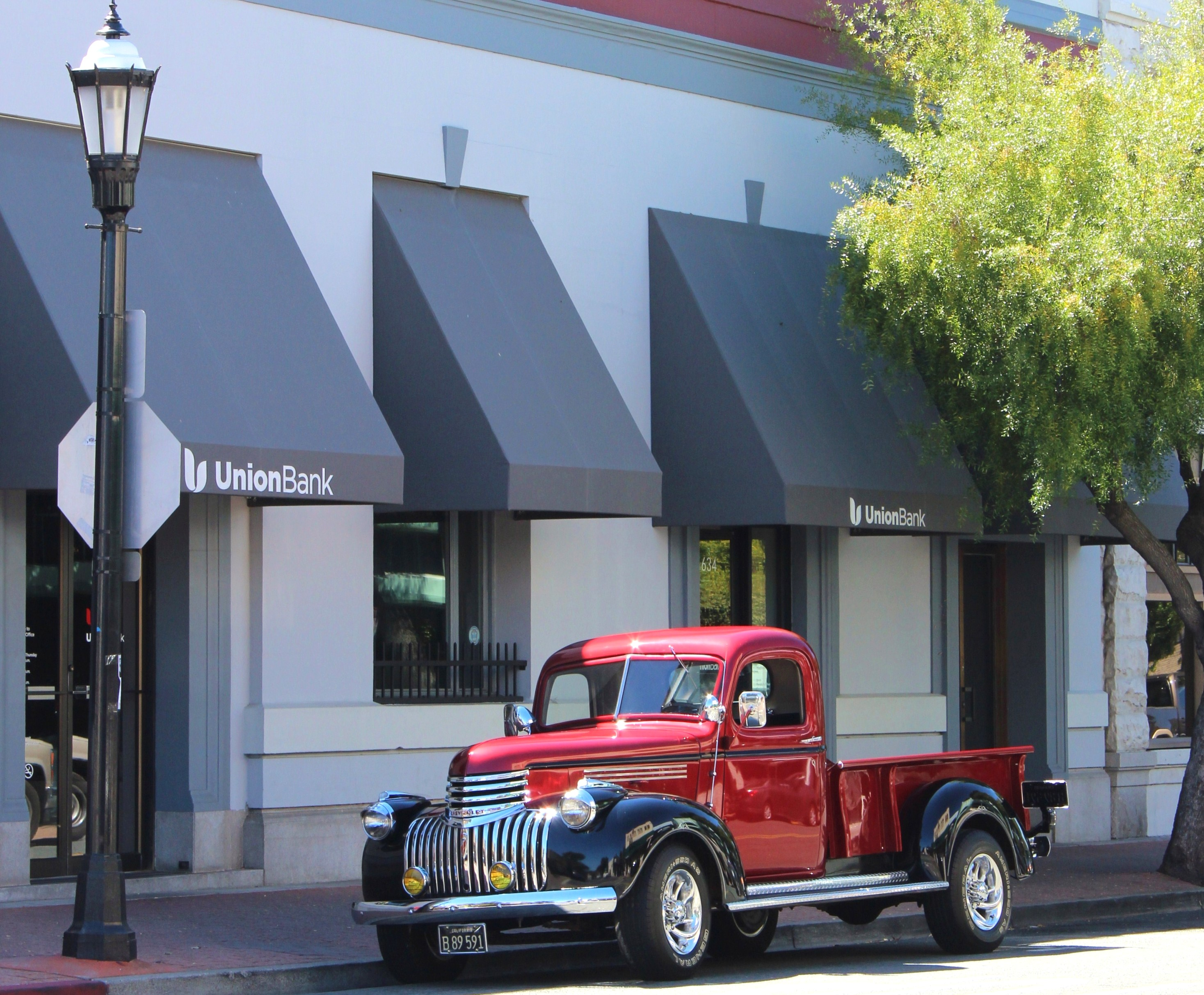
Downtown Martinez

=== Top employers ===
According to the city's 2021 Comprehensive Annual Financial Report, the top employers in the city are:

#	Employer	# of Employees
1	Contra Costa County	10,065
2	Veterans Health Administration	962
3	Kaiser Permanente	730
4	Equilon Enterprises	702
5	Martinez Unified School District	672
6	Wal-Mart	275
7	Safeway	190
8	City of Martinez	136
9	The Home Depot	125
10	Brand Energy & Infrastructure Service	120

== Education ==
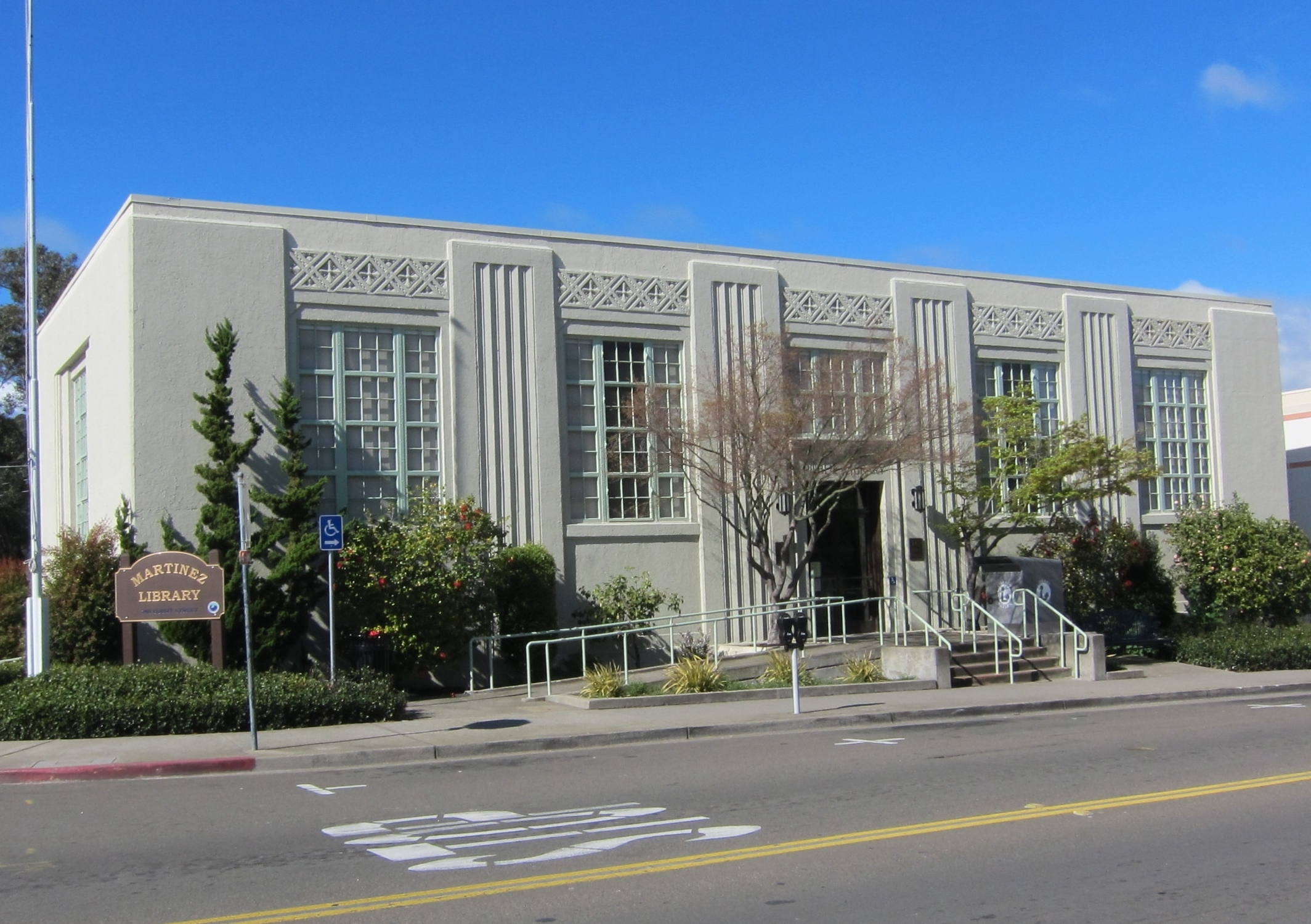
The historic Art Deco–style Martinez Library was built in 1941.

Covering most of Martinez, the Martinez Unified School District encompasses four elementary schools, one middle school, one high school, and two alternative/independent study schools. Students in K-5 attend John Swett, John Muir, Las Juntas, or Morello Park Elementary School. Martinez Junior High School serves students in grades 6 through 8. St. Catherine of Siena is a private Catholic school that serves grades K-8. Alhambra High School serves as the district's comprehensive high school. As of 2006, the district's K-12 enrollment was 4,194.

Part of Martinez is served by the Mount Diablo Unified School District, whose Hidden Valley Elementary School is located in Martinez. St. Catherine of Siena School, a private Roman Catholic elementary school, also serves the Martinez community.

=== Libraries ===
The Martinez Library is part of the Contra Costa County Library and is located in Martinez. The Art Deco style building was placed on the National Register of Historic Places in early 2008.

== Media ==
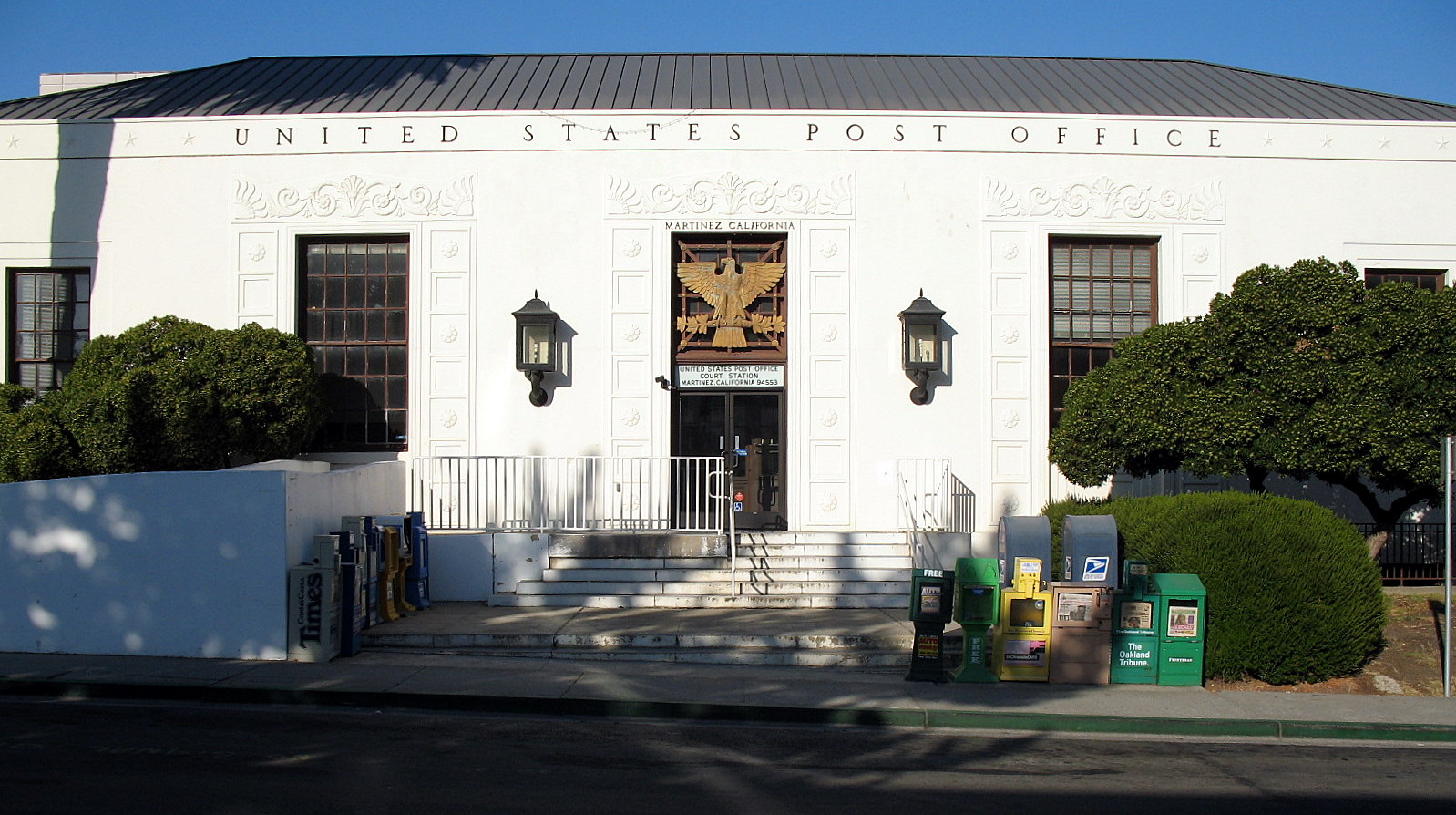
The historic post office is on the National Register of Historic Places.

Martinez and the surrounding area is served by several local newspapers, including the Martinez Tribune and the East Bay Times, along with local news websites, including Martinez Patch and Claycord.com.

The Martinez News-Gazette was published in the city from 1858 to 2019, and was briefly revived in 2020.

== Transportation ==
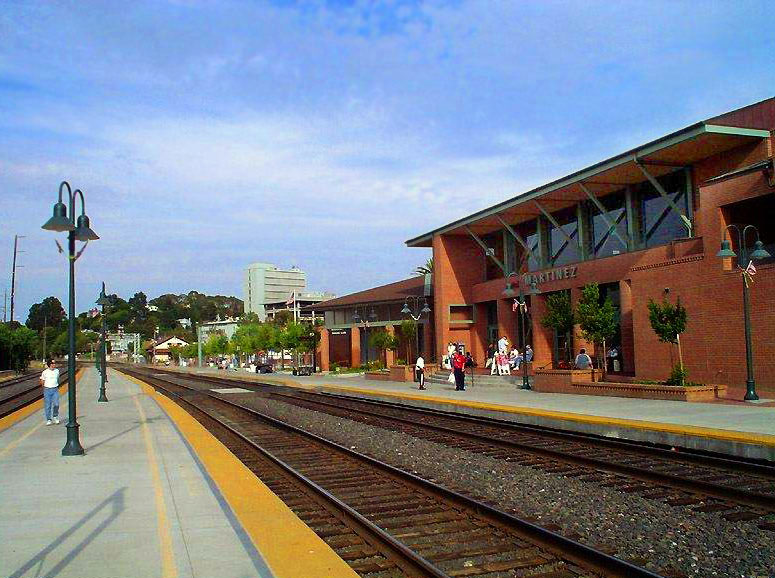
Martinez station, served by Amtrak

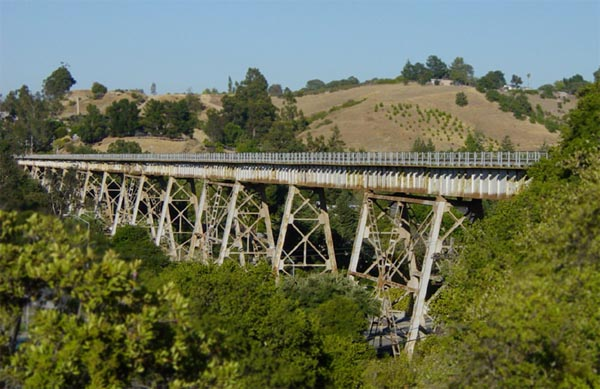
The Alhambra Trestle, commonly known as the Muir Trestle, carries the Stockton Subdivision of BNSF.

WestCAT provides service to the El Cerrito del Norte BART station. The County Connection is the primary local bus operator providing service throughout the area. Among its destinations are the Concord, Pleasant Hill, and Walnut Creek BART stations. The County Connection also provides paratransit service. Tri Delta Transit runs express service between Martinez and eastern Contra Costa County.

State Route 4 runs through Martinez westward to Hercules and eastward through Stockton and the Sierra Nevada to near the border of Nevada. Interstate 680 runs northward across the Benicia–Martinez Bridge toward Sacramento via Interstate 80 and southward toward San Jose.

=== Rail ===
- Amtrak, the national passenger rail system, runs its California Zephyr daily in each direction through Martinez on its route between Emeryville (across the bay from San Francisco) and Chicago, also passing through Sacramento, Reno, Salt Lake City, Denver, and Omaha.
- Amtrak's Coast Starlight operates daily in each direction through Martinez between Seattle and Los Angeles.
- Amtrak California operates its Capitol Corridor trains through Martinez station, providing service several times daily between San Jose to the west and Auburn to the east (via Sacramento).
- Amtrak California also runs its Gold Runner trains through Martinez, providing service several times daily between Oakland to the west and Bakersfield at the south end of the San Joaquin Valley. Amtrak Thruway bus connections branch off both the Gold Runner and the Capitol Corridor, providing service as far as San Diego, Las Vegas, Sparks, Nevada, and Medford, Oregon. One connection originates in Martinez and runs as far north as the Eureka area.
- BART makes a stop called North Concord/Martinez station, although this station lies miles east of the Martinez city limits. The city was overlooked when the system was extended from Concord to Bay Point. However, BART's long-term plans include a new line extension running from Fremont and through the I-680 corridor and ending in Martinez.
- The 1,600-foot-long (490 m), 75-foot-high (23 m) steel Muir Trestle (aka Alhambra Trestle) carries the freight operations of the BNSF Railway through Martinez parallel to California State Route 4 (John Muir Parkway).

== Sister cities ==
The City of Martinez has five sister city affiliations:

- Dunbar, Scotland
- Hanchuan, China
- Isola delle Femmine, Italy
- Milazzo, Italy
- Stresa, Italy

== Notable people ==
- Beatrice Winn Berlin (1922–1999), painter, printmaker, and teacher
- Maurice Benard (born 1963), actor known for playing Sonny Corinthos on the ABC soap opera General Hospital
- Jeff and Paulette Carpoff, convicted fraudsters and owners of DC Solar and the Martinez Clippers
- Yau-Man Chan (born 1952), Malaysian table tennis player, technology executive, and reality television participant
- Trevor Davis (born 1993), football wide receiver
- Sara Del Rey (born 1980), professional wrestling trainer and retired professional wrestler
- Joe DiMaggio (1914–1999), baseball center fielder who played his entire 13-year Hall of fame career in Major League Baseball for the New York Yankees
- Vince DiMaggio (1912–1986), all-star baseball center fielder for the Pittsburgh Pirates, brother of Joe DiMaggio
- Ainjel Emme (born 1978), singer-songwriter, record producer, and recording engineer
- Robb Flynn (born 1967), lead vocalist and rhythm guitarist for heavy metal band Machine Head
- Najee Harris (born 1998), football running back for the Pittsburgh Steelers
- Mark Kozelek (born 1967), singer, songwriter, guitarist, record producer and occasional actor
- Ella Leffland (born 1931), novelist and short story writer
- Tug McGraw (1944–2004), professional baseball relief pitcher and father of singer Tim McGraw
- Seanan McGuire (born 1978), author
- John Muir (1838–1914), naturalist
- Richard Rodgers (born 1992), football tight end for the Philadelphia Eagles
- Sabato "Simon" Rodia (1879 or 1886–1965), creator of giant folk art Watts Towers in Los Angeles
- Victor Salva (born 1958), filmmaker
- J. Otto Seibold (born 1960), visual artist and children's book creator
- Robert Stephenson (born 1993), professional baseball pitcher for the Los Angeles Angels
- Jim Turner (1941–2023), former placekicker for the New York Jets and Denver Broncos
- Norv Turner (born 1952), football coach in the National Football League (NFL)
- Jeff Van Gundy (born 1962), commentator for ESPN and former basketball coach most famous for his time with the New York Knicks
- Stan Van Gundy (born 1959), commentator for TNT and CBS and former basketball coach, taking Orlando Magic to the NBA Finals in 2009
- Travis Williams (1946–1991), football player for the Green Bay Packers

== See also ==
- Martinez beavers
