= Bart Zeller =

American baseball player and coach (born 1941)

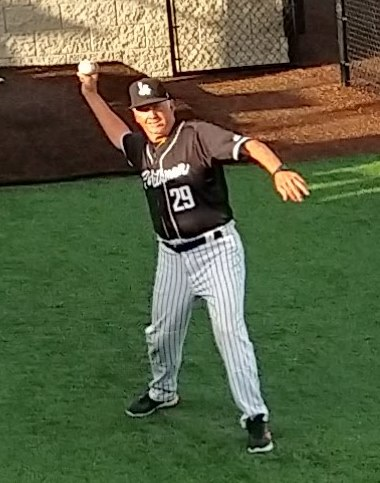
- Zeller with the Milwaukee Milkmen in 2019
- Catcher
- Born: July 22, 1941 (age 84); Chicago Heights, Illinois, U.S.
- Batted: Right Threw: Right

MLB debut
- May 21, 1970, for the St. Louis Cardinals

Last MLB appearance
- May 21, 1970, for the St. Louis Cardinals

MLB statistics
- Games played: 1
- Putouts: 1
- Stats at Baseball Reference

Teams
- St. Louis Cardinals (1970)

Barton Wallace Zeller (born July 22, 1941) is an American professional baseball coach and former catcher. He played one game in Major League Baseball in 1970 for the St. Louis Cardinals.

Zeller grew up in the Chicago Southland and attended Rich Township High School. After high school he played college baseball and college basketball as a freshman at the University of Arizona for the Wildcats. He later transferred to Eastern Illinois where he excelled in both baseball and football.

Zeller was signed by the Cardinals in 1963 and spent four years in the Cardinals' farm system. After missing the 1967 season, he spent 1968 and 1969 with the Lewiston Broncs and Arkansas Travelers, respectively. Zeller played in his only major league game on May 21, 1970, against the Philadelphia Phillies. He was inserted to catch the bottom of the ninth inning. Zeller never had a plate appearance, but was credited with one put out, on Billy McCool's strikeout of Jim Hutto. Zeller batted and threw right-handed. His jersey number was 29. At the time of play he was 6 ft 1 in tall and weighed 185 lb.

Zeller was released as an active player by the Cardinals on June 8, but stayed on as a coach for the balance of the 1970 season. He played in the minors in 1971 in the Milwaukee Brewers and New York Yankees organizations.

Zeller worked as a corporate executive for an insurance company and Telemarketing USA before his children persuaded him to return to baseball as a coach with the Sioux Falls Canaries in 2005.

Zeller was a coach for the Southern Illinois Miners of the Frontier League, an independent baseball league. Zeller began working for the Miners in their inaugural 2007 season and stayed with the team through the 2010 season.

Zeller was hired as manager of the Joliet Slammers in 2011 and was let go after the 2012 season. He was then hired as bench coach of the Washington Wild Things of the Frontier League in 2013 and promoted to manager mid-season after the resignation of Chris Bando. He resigned as manager during the 2014 season citing health reasons.

In 2018, he served as bench coach of the Martinez Clippers of the Pacific Association. In 2019, he returned to the American Association to serve as pitching coach for the Milwaukee Milkmen in their inaugural season.

== See also ==
- List of St. Louis Cardinals coaches
