= DC Solar =

Solar company and Ponzi scheme

- Official Logo
- Type: Private company
- Industry: Renewable energy, Photovoltaics industry
- Founded: 2008
- Founder: Jeffrey Carpoff
- Defunct: 2018
- Fate: Seized by the FBI; Chapter 11 bankruptcy liquidation
- Headquarters: Benicia, California, United States
- Products: Photovoltaic modules, Photovoltaic systems
- Website: http://www.dcsolarsolutionsmfg.com (Wayback Machine)

DC Solar Solutions Inc., trading as DC Solar, was a Benicia, California solar power supplier company. The company was shut down by the Federal Bureau of Investigation in 2018 after it turned out to be a billion-dollar Ponzi scheme.

== Company history ==
The company was founded in 2008 in Concord, California, by Jeffrey Carpoff, an auto mechanic. Berkshire Hathaway invested $340 million in the company. The company supplied solar panels, named Solar Eclipse, to various higher education facilities (using a subsidiary, DC Solar Freedom, for education-related partnerships) such as California State University Northridge and Long Beach City College, as well as Phoenix, Arizona and various NASCAR tracks. It also sponsored Chip Ganassi Racing and several races in the NASCAR calendar in 2018. Prior to the 2018 FBI raid, the Internal Revenue Service had investigated the company in 2016 for financial irregularities regarding the company's dealings.

The company was raided by the FBI in December 2018 amidst allegations of Ponzi scheme associated with the company, and the company later filed for Chapter 11 bankruptcy. According to the FBI and a later SEC investigation, it was alleged that Carpoff and his wife, Paulette, promised 17 investors between 2011 and 2018 federal solar tax credits, lease payments, and profits, but instead spent lavishly on properties, jets, jewelry, a semi-professional baseball team (Martinez Clippers), sponsoring trips and vacations and even work wardrobes for family members, and sponsorship deals for Chip Ganassi Racing and various NASCAR races. Meanwhile, the majority of the lease revenue was being paid with money from new investors, and as many as three-quarters of the mobile solar generators the company claimed to have built (17,000 units) never existed. GPS trackers purportedly attached to deployed units to verify their locations were buried instead to make it appear that the units were operational and where they were supposed to be.

In 2019, federal authorities auctioned a car collection they amassed of more than 150 classic and contemporary cars, including Kyle Larson's car that won the 2018 Coca-Cola Firecracker 250 race. The raid prompted Chip Ganassi Racing to shut down their NASCAR Xfinity Series team and a lawsuit between International Speedway Corporation and SunTrust Bank regarding the fate of the generators. The Carpoffs pled guilty to wire fraud and money laundering in January 2020, forfeiting $120 million in assets. Four other business partners pled guilty to crimes.

On November 9, 2021, Jeffery Carpoff was sentenced to 30 years in prison after he pleaded guilty to charges of conspiracy to commit wire fraud and money laundering. In addition to Jeffery his wife Paulette Carpoff and five other defendants also pleaded guilty to similar charges in relation to the scheme.

== Sponsorship ==
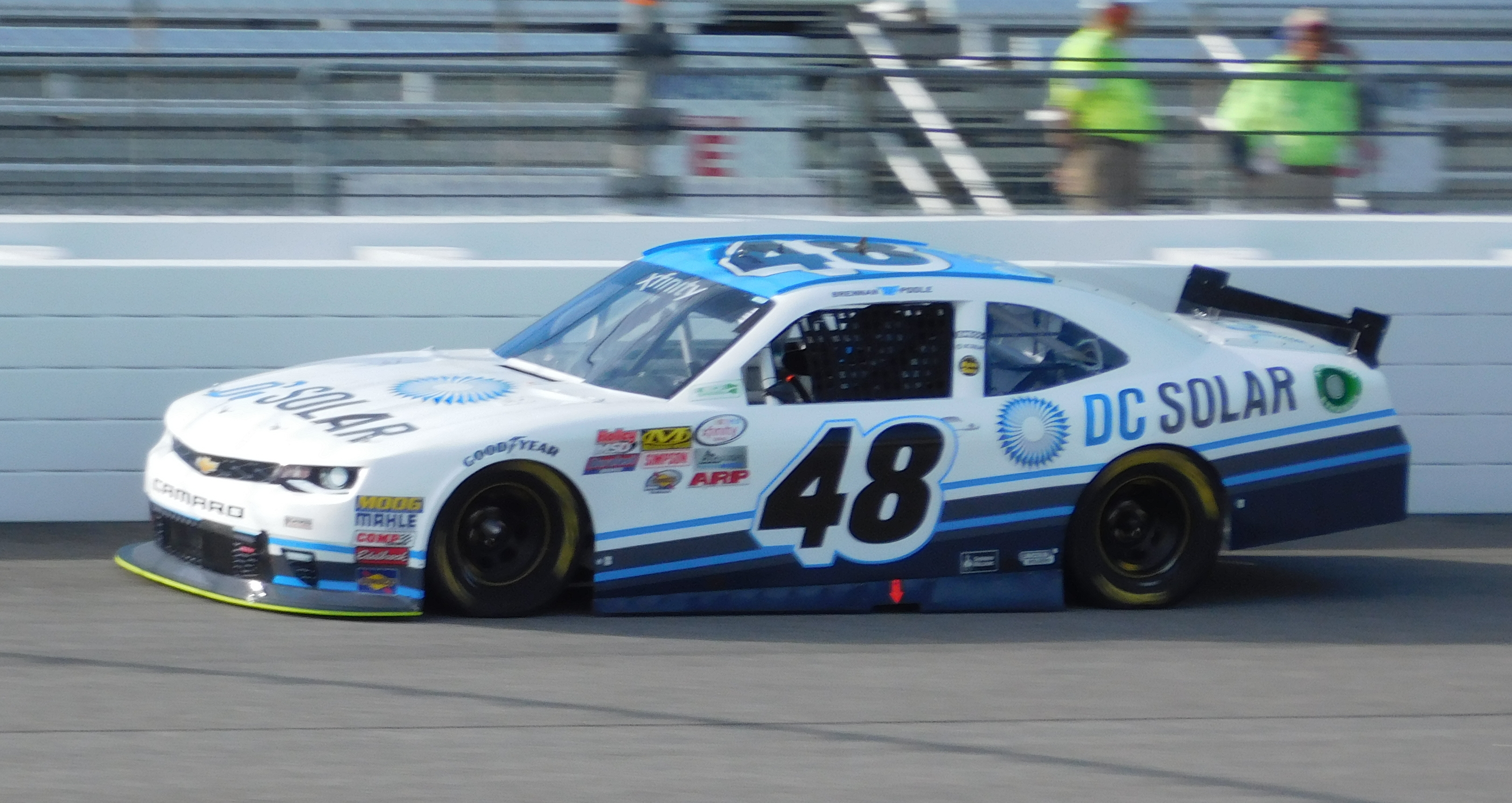
Brennan Poole's DC Solar-sponsored Chevrolet Camaro at Richmond Raceway in 2016, their initial outing in the sport.

DC Solar began their NASCAR sponsorship at the end of 2014, when they got into contact with then ARCA Racing Series driver Brennan Poole. After only a few meetings they decided on going to the NASCAR Xfinity Series operation of HScott Motorsports in the No. 42 car in a partnership with Chip Ganassi Racing, moving Poole up from ARCA after 4 seasons of struggling to find rides at Venturini Motorsports due to a lack of funding, and taking the spot vacated by Dylan Kwasniewski at the end of 2014 after Rockstar Energy didn't renew their partnership for the 2015 season. In 2016 they expanded upon their partnership adding Christopher Bell and Kyle Larson in select NASCAR Camping World Truck Series races. In 2017, the company once again switched to expanding upon their sponsorship efforts in the sport, this time specifically with Chip Ganassi Racing's team, sponsoring Poole as well as Larson in the Monster Energy NASCAR Cup Series.

In June of 2018, 6 months before the company's raid, Poole filed a lawsuit against the company, Chip Ganassi Racing, and agency Spire Sports + Entertainment for breach of contract, alleging that both conspired to take away DC Solar's sponsorship from his Xfinity Series' ride and move it to the No. 42 CGR Cup Series team (then driven by Larson) and that Spire's involvement representing both driver and team constituted a conflict of interest. Spire and Chip Ganassi Racing initially cited performance reasons (lack of race victories) as the reason for termination of Poole's sponsorship; The suit was later settled out of court immediately following the raid of the company.

They also sponsored Xfinity Series races in 2018 at Phoenix Raceway and Las Vegas Motor Speedway (both now since named United Rentals 200 and Alsco Uniforms 302), the NASCAR Truck Series race at Las Vegas in 2016 (last known as Bucked Up 200, which has since been discontinued; the race distance was advertised as a 350-kilometer (217-mile) race the year DC Solar sponsored the event), as well as the naming rights to the FanGrounds (an area where fans could visit the pit garages) at Richmond Raceway.
