= Contra Costa County Library =

Public library system in California, US

- Location: Contra Costa County, California
- Established: 1913; 113 years ago
- Branches: 26

Access and use
- Circulation: 7,422,673
- Population served: 1,024,319
- Members: 455,607

Other information
- Director: Alison McKee, County Librarian
- Website: ccclib.org

The Contra Costa County Library is the public library system in Contra Costa County, California, United States. There are 26 community libraries including the NRHP-listed Martinez Library, access to electronic information via a website, over 455,000 cardholders and more than 7 million items borrowed annually. Its headquarters are in Martinez.

== History ==
Founded in 1913, the Contra Costa County Library brought a commitment to widespread, county-wide service. Prior to this time, libraries for the public included the Martinez Free Reading Room and Library Association established in 1896 and the Richmond Public Library established in 1909.

By the 1920s, there were over 40 branches and the Contra Costa County Library also provided service to 64 public schools. During the years following World War II, the library began to reflect the newly developing suburban nature of the county it served. In the mid-1950s, the library began an ambitious program to construct much larger branch buildings. This eventually led to the construction of most of the buildings that the library uses today. Between 1958 and 1974, 15 of the 21 library buildings now in use were opened. Among these were the county's first central library and the adjacent administrative and technical services center, which opened in 1961. At the present time, there are 26 community libraries and an online service available anywhere.

== Service ==
The library provides both physical and online collections. Users require a free library card to access most services.

Approximate figures for service use in the year 2009–2010 include 455,000 cardholders, and over 7 million items borrowed; 400,000 online subscription database searches, 600,000 items renewed online, 700,000 holds placed using the online catalog, 30,000 eBooks circulated, and 150,000 program attendees.

== Other programs ==
Project Second Chance

Project Second Chance (PSC), the Contra Costa County Library's adult literacy program, was founded in 1984. PSC offers basic literacy instruction by volunteers to adults. Since it began, the program has helped more than 7,000 people improve their reading, writing, and spelling skills.

Discover & Go

Discover and Go is a museum pass program developed by Contra Costa County Library in 2011 that provides California library cardholders with free and discounted tickets to local museums and cultural institutions. Discover & Go was awarded the 2012 National Medal for Museum and Library Service, the nation's highest honor recognizing exceptional contributions of museums and libraries. The program is still expanding with grant funding from the California State Library.
