= Napa Silverados =

American minor- league professional baseball team

Logo
Cap insignia

Information
- League: Pacific Association of Professional Baseball Clubs
- Location: Napa, California
- Ballpark: Miner Family Field
- Founded: 2017
- Colors: Black, silver, dark red, white
- Ownership: Napa Professional Baseball Company LLC
- Website: silveradosbaseball.com

The Napa Silverados were a professional baseball team based in Napa, California, United States, and were members of the Pacific Association of Professional Baseball Clubs, an independent professional baseball circuit not affiliated with Major League Baseball. The team was founded in summer 2017 by Napa area businessman Bruce Johnston, but was sold to Napa Professional Baseball Company, consisting of David Halloran, Tito Fuentes Jr. (son of former San Francisco Giants player Tito Fuentes), and Alma Eugenio Fuentes on March 20, 2019. They played their home games at Miner Family Field.

== Season-by-season results ==
Napa Silverados
Season	Overall	Win %	Standing	Manager	Postseason
2018	31–49	.388	5th	Tito Fuentes Jr.	Did not qualify
2019	29–35	.453	4th	Tito Fuentes Jr.	Won wild card (Vallejo); Lost semifinal (San Rafael)
Totals	60–84	.417	—	—	1–1 (.500)
