= Hour record (recumbents) =

Record for the longest distance cycled in one hour on a bicycle

The hour record is the record for the longest distance cycled in one hour on a bicycle from a stationary start. Cyclists attempt this record alone on the track without other competitors present. It is considered perhaps the most prestigious record in all of cycling. Over history, various cyclists ranging from unknown amateurs to well-known professionals have held the record, adding to its prestige and allure. There are several records, one of which is the record for streamlined human powered vehicles, also known as recumbent bicycles.

== History ==
The history of the Hour Record may be divided into three categories: UCI Hour Records, Recumbents Hour Records and Streamlined Human Powered Vehicle Records.

Since 1914 it was well known that a bicycle inside of a streamlined shape such as body made of metal or later composite materials, can be significantly faster than an ordinary bicycle due to better aerodynamics. Hence aerodynamic enclosures were banned in 1914 by the UCI. In 1974, an organization called the International Human Powered Vehicle Association IHPVA was formed to recognize "unlimited" human powered vehicle records. The current record for a streamlined recumbent bicycle enclosed in an aerodynamic shell under the International Human Powered Vehicle Association (IHPVA) rules is held by Francesco Russo at 92.43 km (57.43 mi). This was done outdoors on a large automotive test track in Germany. This represents the absolute furthest someone has pedaled in one hour under their own power.

On July 7, 1933, a Frenchman, Francis Faure set a One-Hour record of 45.055 km (27.996 miles) that was faster than the conventional bicycle record at that time. This caused controversy in the world of cycling as Faure was considered a "second-category" cyclist, but his recumbent bicycle had effectively allowed him to win races against professional riders of the time. It became known that the recumbent bicycle design (where a rider pedals in a reclining position) can be faster than the ordinary bicycle position due to the rider having a smaller frontal area (i.e. making a smaller hole through the wind) which lower the wind resistance. In 1934, the world governing body of cycling voted to enforce restrictions which effectively banned the recumbent bicycle from bicycle racing. These restrictions defined the placement of the seat, pedals, handlebar position etc. in relation to the rider's body. Since most commercial cycling was based on what racers would use to race, the "conventional" bicycle continued to be the dominant design. It wasn't until 2006, that an organization called the WRRA World Recumbent Racing Association was created, that recumbent records were recognized again. The current record for is held by a Frenchman, Aurelien Bonneteau who rode 56.696 km (35.229 miles) on July 16, 2014. This distance is further than the UCI Best Human Effort by Chris Boardman of 56.375 km (35.03 miles)

== Streamlined human powered vehicles Hour Record ==
With fully faired human powered vehicles (typically streamlined recumbent bicycles) much higher velocities are possible. These feature vehicle a lower frontal area than a UCI bicycle due to their recumbent seating design of the rider. They enclose the rider and machine in aerodynamic shapes made of carbon fibre, Kevlar or fiberglass to reduce air resistance. The record hour average speeds for these machines – 90 km/h (56 mph) for men and 84 km/h (52 mph) for women – are faster than a UCI rider could perform even in a short 200-meter sprint for 10 seconds, 72 km/h (45 mph), demonstrating their higher level of efficiency and speed.

The International Human Powered Vehicle Association (IHPVA) was started in 1975 by Jack Lambie and California college professor, Dr. Chet Kyle, who challenged his students to build a faster bicycle. The recumbent design (banned in 1934) and the use of additional streamlined devices (banned in 1914) were allowed back into a sanctioned competition.

The IHPVA hour record was first set in 1979 by Olympian Ron Skarin, who went 51.31 km (31.88 mi) on a streamlined upright bicycle designed by Chet and Joyce Kyle. It was 40 years since a streamlined upright had held the record, but this record was short-lived. The following year, Ron Skarin and Eric Hollander went 74.51 km (46.30 mi) on a streamlined recumbent tandem, a 23 km increase on the previous record. The record stood for ten years, and was the last time the record would be held by a tandem. The single-rider record, however, was beaten by Eric Edwards in 1980 at 59.45 km (36.94 mi), and then by Fred Markham in 1989 at 73 km (45.36 mi).

In 1990, Pat Kinch went 75.57 km (46.96 mi) on a streamlined recumbent, narrowly breaking the record set by Skarin and Hollander. Lars Teutenberg exceeded this in 1996, reaching 78.04 km (48.49 mi). Sam Whittingham went 79.13 km (49.17 mi) in 1998, then broke his own record in 2004 when he cycled 84.22 km (52.33 mi) on the GM/Opel test track in Dudenhofen, Germany.

In 2006, Fred Markham, a 1976-80 US Olympic team member, set a record distance of 85.99 km (53.43 mi) on the track at the Nissan Technical Center, near Casa Grande in Arizona. Markham won $18,000 as a share of the $25,000 Dempsey-MacCready One Hour Prize that was to be awarded to the first HPV to surpass 90 km. Although Markham had not exceeded 90 km, the prize time limit had expired and its shares awarded to those that traveled furthest. Both Markham and Whittingham rode vehicles called Varna designed and built by the Bulgarian sculptor George Georgiev, who lives in British Columbia, Canada. Sam Whittingham won back the record one year later at the Nissan Technical Center with 86.75 km, and went on to set a distance of 90.60 km (56.30 mi) in 2009, at the Ford Michigan Proving Grounds.

Since a split in the years 2004-2008 there have been two organizations recognizing world records for streamlined recumbents: the World Human Powered Vehicle Association (WHPVA) and the IHPVA. The IHPVA does not recognize all newer records.

In August 2011, Francesco Russo travelled 91.56 km (56.89 mi) at the Dekra Test Oval near Klettwitz, Germany. He rode the Eiviestretto bicycle, which he designed and built with earlier record-holder Damjan Zabovnik. The Eiviestretto is a backwards-ridden vehicle with the rider's head pointed in the direction of travel. The rider lies on his back, using a mirror to navigate. The design is based on Eivie III from Damjan Zabovnik, with several improvements. In 2016 Russo improved his record to 92.43 km (57.44 mi) on a bike he designed himself.

In July 2009, at the Ford Michigan Proving Grounds, Barbara Buatois set two world records in one weekend. Buatois, a 32-year-old French woman, first broke the existing women's record on Friday July 17, covering 82.12 km (51.03 mi). This broke the existing women's mark by 12%, and gave her the title of the 6th fastest human to have done the One Hour. However, her 84.02 km (52.20 mi) on late Sunday evening moved her up to the title of the 4th fastest human (man or woman) to have done the One Hour. She rode a vehicle called the Varna Tempest, designed and built by Georgi Georgiev of Canada. The Ford oval is around 8 km, with 60% of the course turns and 40% straightaways. It had been rebuilt and repaved the year prior to these attempts. The elevation of the course is flat at 295 meters above sea level, hence this is considered a low-altitude location (<700 meters) per IHPVA/WHPVA rules. Barbara Buatois went on to set the ladies 200-meter top speed record of 75 mph at Battle Mountain in 2009 and 2010, and also finish the 2010 RAAM Race Across America as the #1 lady finisher. She used a Stock recumbent for this ride across America.

== Unfaired recumbents and One Hour record ==
Chris Boardman's UCI Absolute (formerly known as Best Human effort) Hour record of 56.375 km (35.03 miles) has now been bettered twice by a rider on an unfaired recumbent bicycle, without a streamlined enclosure. Frenchman, Aurelien Bonneteau rode 56.696 km (35.229 miles) on July 16, 2014, and previously 56.597 km (35.168 miles) on May 25, 2012. Mr. Bonneteau is a tall rider over 2 meters in height, who at one time trained with the French national team. He hand-built each of his carbon fiber recumbents. These featured a very reclined seat position (almost flat on back), a single elliptical chainring, short-length crankset to minimize the bending of his legs and volume of air swept out for better aerodynamics, and dual 700c (ETRTO 622) approximately 27-inch diameter wheels. Both rides were at the Velodrome du Lac in Bordeaux, the site of several UCI Hour records including Rominger's, Indurain's and Obree's.

In 1934 the UCI set restrictions on bicycle design which effectively banned the use of recumbents in racing. At the time a racing cyclist, considered to be a 2nd category, not top-notch professional, broke the Hour record. This section refers to recumbent bicycles without additional aerodynamic enclosures. Amongst the various racing associations that host racing events for such bicycles, these are called Stock Recumbents or Unfaired Recumbents.

The hour record for recumbent bicycles without aerodynamic fairings, set by Francis Faure in 1933, was broken in 2007 by Sean Costin, who covered 48.80 km (28.46 mi) on the 382m outdoor concrete velodrome in Northbrook, Illinois. Costin then rode 47.89 km (29.76 mi) on the 250m indoor wooden velodrome at the ADT Event Center in California. He rode a recumbent made by the Polish manufacturer Velokraft (model name NoCom), which he converted to a fixed-gear for the indoor event. Both events were conducted by the World Recumbent Racing Association (WRRA).

On October 24, 2008, Gert-Jan Wijers bettered Costin with 50.39 km (31.31 mi) on the 250m Alkmaar velodrome located near sea-level. Wijers rode a production version of the M5 carbon high-racer recumbent modified with dual disk carbon wheels and a fixed-gear freewheel. Wijers became the first unfaired recumbent rider to exceed 50 km. On May 15, 2009, 26-year-old Aurélien Bonneteau set a new WRRA unfaired world record of 50.52 km (31.40 mi) in Bordeaux-Lax, France, at the Guy Lapebie indoor velodrome. Bonneteau was racing an M5 lowracer set up with single speed gearing, both front and rear wheel disks, and a very elliptical chainring.

On the weekend of October 17–18, 2009, a special event called the Apeldoorn Recumbent Record Weekend was held at the Apeldoorn 250 meter indoor wooden Velodrome in the Netherlands. The Unfaired Recumbent One Hour record was broken three times in quick succession this weekend. Gert-Jan Wijers of the Netherlands set a new mark of 51.287 km (31.868 miles) on a M5 Carbon High-Racer recumbent on October 17. The next day October 18, 2009, Niels van de Wal set a new mark of 51.33 km (31.895 miles) on a M5 mid-racer recumbent called the Nadir. This was slightly lower to the ground than the high-racer version. However, later in the day, Aurélien Bonneteau set a new Unfaired Recumbent One Hour record of 52.074 km (32.357 miles) this time on the M5 Carbon High-Racer recumbent. These records are recognized by the WRRA World Recumbent Racing Association. Details of the race weekend here:

Barbara Buatois of France set two Ladies Unfaired Recumbent One-Hour records within two weeks in October 2009. She rode a Zockra Le Rapide recumbent. At the Apeldoorn event on October 17, 2009, she rode 46.048 km (28.613 miles), a mark which would have also broken the long-standing men's record of Francis Faure from 1933. Two weeks later, at the Velodrome du Lac in Bordeaux, France, Buatois rode 46.348 km (28.799 miles) on October 31, 2009 for another record. At the October 2011 Apeldoorn event, Janneke Sindram unofficially broke this record with a ride of 46.505 km (28.90 miles). This record is not yet verified by the WRRA. Sindram had reportedly just starting racing that year.

Bonneteau uses a carbon fiber recumbent that he has built himself. This recumbent features two 700c-sized wheels similar to the M5 Carbon high-racer, and a single speed and an elliptical chainring. A picture of the bike was posted on a discussion forum.

== Streamlined Human Powered Vehicle Records (Men's) ==
Hour record-holders and dates:
Date	Rider	Location	Distance (km)	Distance (km)	Vehicle type
7 July 1933	Francis Faure	Paris, France	45.055		Riding a streamlined "Velocar". Originally accepted as a valid upright bicycle Hour Record it was reclassified by the UCI on 1 April 1934 to "Records Set By Human Powered Vehicles (HPV's) with Special Aerodynamic Features"
18 November 1933	Marcel Berthet	Outdoor velodrome, France	49.990		streamlined enclosed upright bicycle
13 March 1938	Francois Faure	Outdoor velodrome, France	50.537		streamlined enclosed recumbent
5 May 1979	Ron Skarin	Ontario Motor Speedway 2.5 mile oval, California, USA	51.310		streamlined enclosed upright bicycle
4 May 1980	Eric Edwards	Ontario Motor Speedway 2.5 mile oval, California, USA	59.450		streamlined enclosed recumbent tricycle
4 May 1980	Ron Skarin & Eric Hollander	Ontario Motor Speedway 2.5 mile oval, California, USA		74.510	streamlined enclosed recumbent tandem tricycle, riders back to back
29 September 1984	Fred Markham	Indianapolis Motor Speedway 2.5 mile oval, USA	60.350		streamlined enclosed recumbent
10 September 1985	Richard Crane	Mira Proving Grounds, Warwickshire, England	66.300		streamlined enclosed recumbent
28 August 1986	Fred Markham	Championships course, Vancouver, Canada	67.010		streamlined enclosed recumbent
15 September 1989	Fred Markham	Michigan International Speedway 2 mile oval, Adrian, USA	73.000		streamlined enclosed recumbent
8 September 1990	Pat Kinch	Millbrook Proving Ground, 2 mile oval Bedfordshire, England	75.570		streamlined enclosed recumbent
27 July 1996	Lars Teutenberg	BMW Test Circuit 7.7 km track, Munich, Germany	78.040		streamlined enclosed recumbent
29 July 1998	Sam Whittingham	PMG Test Track 6.86 km Blainville, Canada	79.136		streamlined enclosed recumbent
7 August 1999	Lars Teutenberg	GM/Opel Test Track 4.8 km oval, Dudenhofen, Germany	81.158		streamlined enclosed recumbent
27 July 2002	Lars Teutenberg	GM/Opel Test Track 4.8 km oval, Dudenhofen, Germany	82.600		streamlined enclosed recumbent
19 November 2003	Sam Whittingham	Continental Tire test track, 8.5 mile oval, Uvalde, Texas	83.710		streamlined enclosed recumbent
31 July 2004	Sam Whittingham	GM/Opel Test Track 4.8 km oval, Dudenhofen, Germany	84.215		streamlined enclosed recumbent
2 July 2006	Fred Markham	Nissan Proving Ground 5.662 mile oval, Casa Grande, Arizona	85.991		streamlined enclosed recumbent
8 April 2007	Sam Whittingham	Nissan Proving Ground 5.662 mile oval, Casa Grande, Arizona	86.752		streamlined enclosed recumbent
12 July 2008	Damjan Zabovnik	Dekra Lausitzring, 5.8 km oval, Germany	87.123		streamlined enclosed recumbent, rider faces backwards
19 July 2009	Sam Whittingham	Ford Michigan Proving Grounds, 5 mile oval, USA	90.598		streamlined enclosed recumbent
2 August 2011	Francesco Russo	Dekra Lausitzring, 5.8 km oval, Germany	91.556		streamlined enclosed recumbent, rider faces backward
6 July 2013	Ruben Koch & Dominik Dusek Dekra	Dekra Lausitzring, 5.8 km oval, Germany		83.013	streamlined enclosed recumbent tandem, riders on top each other
26 June 2016	Francesco Russo	Dekra Lausitzring, 5.8 km oval, Germany	92.432		streamlined enclosed recumbent, rider faces backward

== Streamlined Human Powered Vehicle Records (Women's) ==
- 84.02 km/h Barbara Buatois (FRA), 19 July 2009, Ford Michigan Proving Grounds, Romeo, Michigan
- 82.12 km/h Barbara Buatois (FRA), 17 July 2009, Ford Michigan Proving Grounds, Romeo, Michigan
- 73.41 km/h Rosmarie Bühler (SUI), August 2004
- 68.97 km/h Ellen van Vugt (NED), August 2004
- 68.33 km/h Ellen van Vugt (NED), August 2002
- 62.26 km/h Corinne van Noordenne (NED), August 2001
- 57.47 km/h Rosmarie Bühler (SUI), June 2001

== See also ==
- Cycling records
