= Sebastiaan Bowier =

Dutch cyclist

Personal information
- Full name: Sebastiaan Bowier
- Born: August 23, 1987 (age 39) Rotterdam, the Netherlands

Cycling career
- Sport: Cycling
- Role: Rider

Jonkheer Sebastiaan Bowier (born August 23, 1987) is a Dutch cyclist.

In September 2013, he achieved a speed of 133.78 kilometres per hour (83.13 mph) in a human powered vehicle (HPV), breaking the previous world record.

== Human Power Team ==
Bowier has been a member of the Human Power Team since 2011. In 2011, he won the Battle Mountain race, but failed to break the world record, instead taking the European and Dutch records with a speed of 129 kilometres per hour (80 mph). He was for the second year running the strongest cyclist during selection, and both an experienced recumbent rider and road cyclist.

== Record attempt ==
On 15 September 2013, Bowier broke the International Human Powered Vehicle Association record, previously set by Canadian Sam Whittingham in 2009, by 0.6 kilometres per hour (0.37 mph). The speed of 133.78 kilometres per hour (83.13 mph) was achieved over a 200 metres (660 ft) stretch of road in Battle Mountain, on a recumbent bicycle named VeloX3, designed by students from the Delft University of Technology and the VU University Amsterdam. He required a run-up of 8 km (5.0 mi) before setting the record.

=== Vehicle ===
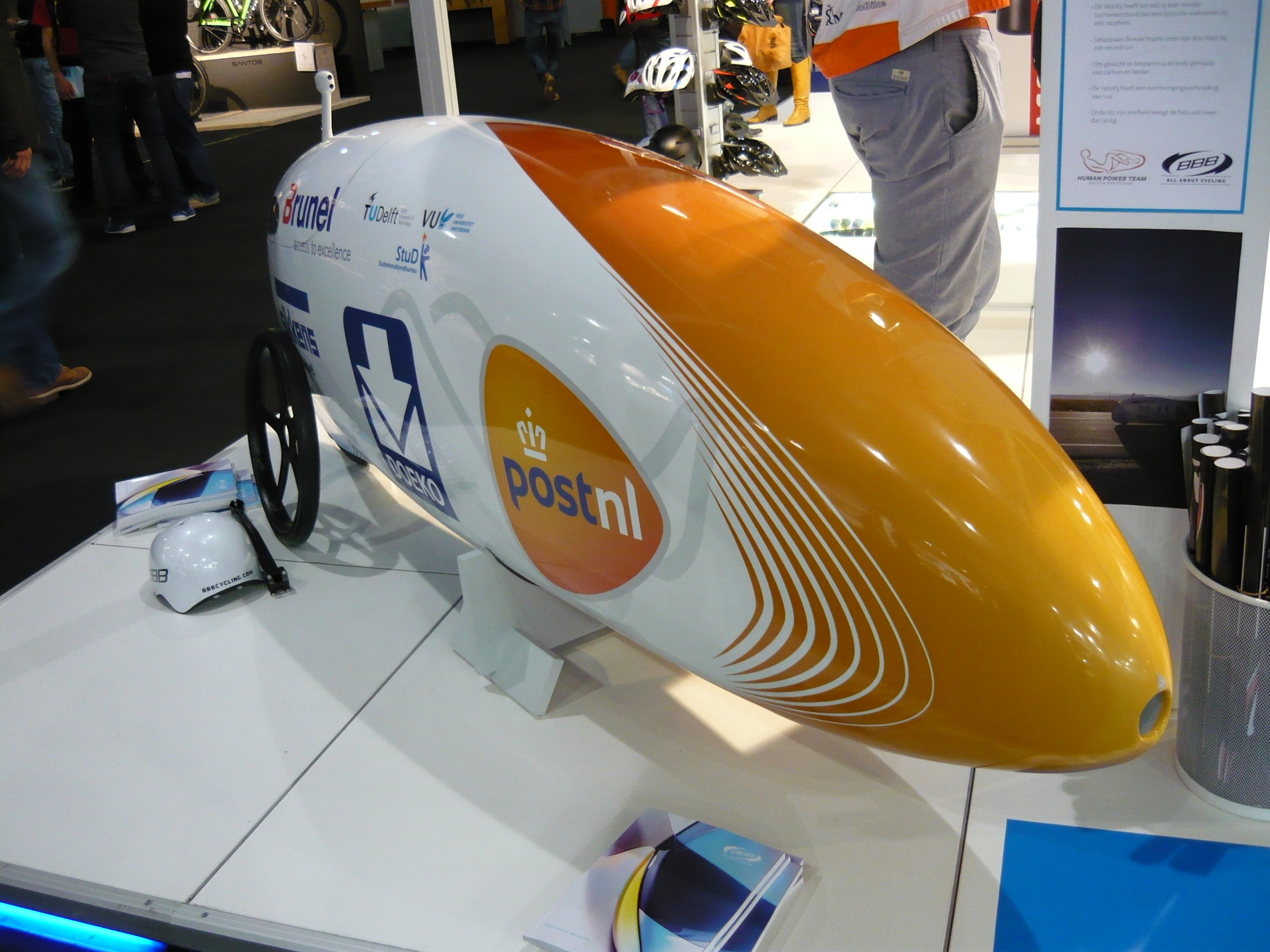
VeloX3

The VeloX3 bicycle he used has a profiled carbon fibre shell covered with the same type of coating used on Formula One cars. It experiences approximately one-tenth of the drag of a conventional bicycle, and uses a camera on the top for navigation. It was found that hard pedalling led to deformation of the shell, which had to be corrected before the record could be set. Two new shells were used for the racing, with parts from the testing vehicles being reused.

=== Training ===
He trained for 15 to 20 hours every week for a year, under a regime chosen by Human Movement Sciences students from VU University in Amsterdam.

== Personal life ==
Bowier works for bicycle component manufacturer BBB Cycles as a product designer.
