= Lars Teutenberg =

German cyclist

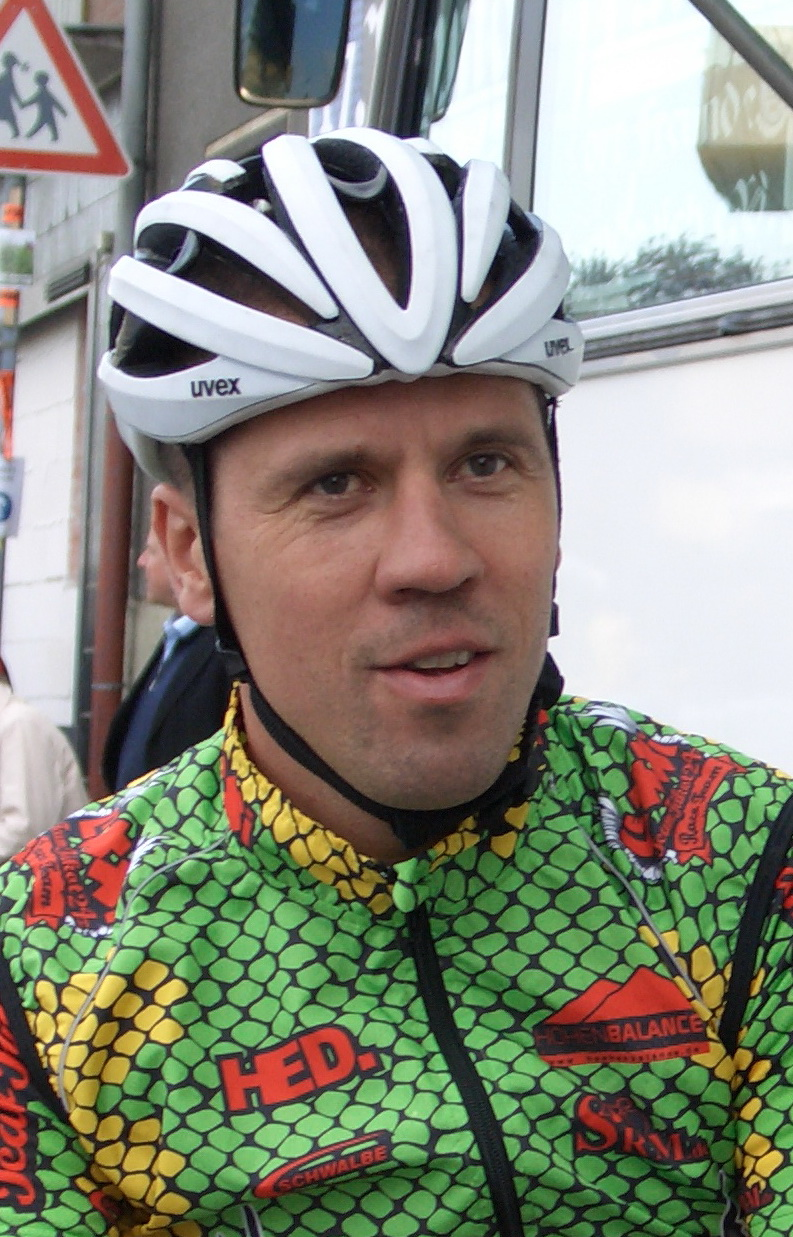
- Lars Teutenberg in 2010.

Personal information
- Full name: Lars Teutenberg
- Born: 2 September 1970 (age 56) Mettmann, West Germany

Cycling career
- Sport: Cycling
- Current team: Scott Racing
- Discipline: Road
- Role: Rider (retired); Technical director Technical consultant

Amateur teams
- 2003: C.C. Arenal–Emaya
- 2008: FC Lexxi Speedbike e.V.
- 2013: RRG Porz

Professional teams
- 1994: Küppers Kölsch
- 1995: Faggin
- 1997: E-plus Service
- 1998–1999: EC Bayer
- 2000: BankGiroLoterij–Batavus
- 2005: Team Sparkasse
- 2007: Team Volksbank

Managerial teams
- 2010–2011: Team HTC–Columbia (technical director)
- 2012–2015: GreenEDGE (technical director)
- 2012–: Scott Racing (technical consultant)
- 2017–: Bora–Hansgrohe (performance director)

Lars Teutenberg (born 2 September 1970 in Mettmann) is a former German professional bicycle rider. He is the older brother of Sven and Ina-Yoko Teutenberg, who are also professional bicycle riders. After retiring from the professional peloton, Teutenberg continued to compete in individual time trials. He has since worked as a technical director for Team HTC–Columbia and GreenEDGE. He was also involved in supervising Matthias Brändle's attempt on the hour record in October 2014.

In October 2016 Bora–Hansgrohe announced that he had been appointed as the team's performance director.

== Major results ==
1992
1st Tour de Wallonie
1996
IHPVA recumbent hour record: 78.040 km (48.492 mi)
1998
1st Overall Thüringen Rundfahrt der U23
1999
IHPVA recumbent hour record: 81.158 km (50.429 mi)
2001
9th Overall Tour of Japan

1st Stage 4

10th Nationale Sluitingsprijs
2002
IHPVA recumbent hour record: 82.600 km (51.325 mi)
2003
1st Cinturó de l'Empordà
1st Rund um Düren
2007
2nd National Time Trial Championships
2012
3rd National Time Trial Championships
2014
3rd National Time Trial Championships
2015
8th White Spot / Delta Road Race
