= Avatar 2000 =

Bicycle designed by David Gordon Wilson

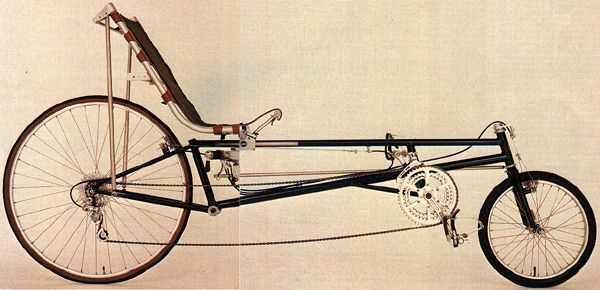

The Avatar 2000 was an early and influential long-wheelbase recumbent bicycle designed by David Gordon Wilson.

It was featured in the film Brainstorm, ridden by Christopher Walken, as well as in Richard Ballantine's Richard's Bicycle Book. Ballantine's own Avatar 2000 held the non-UCI world bicycle speed record from 1982-1983.
