= Cruzbike =

American front-wheel drive recumbent bicycle manufacturer

- Type: Private
- Industry: Bicycle manufacturing
- Founded: 2005
- Founder: John Tolhurst
- Headquarters: Newburyport, Massachusetts, United States
- Area served: Worldwide
- Key people: John Tolhurst (founder); Jim Parker (owner); Maria Parker (owner)
- Products: Recumbent bicycles
- Website: cruzbike.com

Cruzbike (/ˈkruːzˌbaɪk/ CROOZ-byke) is a brand of recumbent bicycles based in Newburyport, Massachusetts, United States. The company was founded in 2005 and all models are now designed in the United States and manufactured in Taiwan. Cruzbike started life in Australia and was featured on the ABC show The New Inventors. It is fairly unusual in that it makes a front-wheel drive recumbent bicycle with a Moving Bottom Bracket (MBB). The bottom bracket is the piece that the pedals attach to, and in this case it moves (or pivots) left and right with the front wheel when steering the bicycle. This design allows for better climbing ability (due in part to some involvement of the upper body as well), and eliminates "heel strike" on turns, but comes with (for some people) a slightly longer learning curve as there is a pedal-steer effect.

== History ==
In 2004 John Tolhurst developed a kit to convert a regular (diamond-frame, or upright) bicycle to a front-wheel drive recumbent. The purpose of the kit was to provide a means to circumvent the high purchase price of recumbent bicycles. The conversion kit served its purpose but had several disadvantages including the aesthetics of the converted bicycles, the difficulty of fitting the bike to the rider, as well as concerns about the longevity of a frame not designed for the stresses encountered in recumbent bicycles. A further concern was the lack of a direct connection between the handlebars and the bottom bracket, a problem also seen in previous recumbent bicycle designs. John Tolhurst designed the Silvio to overcome these shortcomings and was awarded a US patent for the front wheel drive moving bottom bracket Silvio in 2010.

Jim and Maria Parker joined the company in 2005 and started producing recumbent bicycles in addition to the now discontinued conversion kits. In January 2015, the Parkers bought out John Tolhurst's interest in the company and became the sole owners.

== Records ==
Maria Parker attempted the women's 12-hour record on October 12, 2009, on a Silvio. She achieved 240.01 Miles in 12 hours. This set the WUCA 200 Mile Road Record - Women Unfaired Recumbent and WUCA 100 Mile Road Record - Women Unfaired Recumbent records. In 2011 she broke her own record. In 2012 she set the adult female 24-hour time trial recumbent record with a distance of 469 miles. She also rode a Cruzbike on the 2013 Race Across America and took first in the women's category.

On May 16, 2015, Lief Zimmerman established the WUCA recumbent record crossing the state of Washington, north to south, 254.8 miles in 12h 28m.

In October 2015, Larry Oslund set the 100 mile TT world masters record for unfaired recumbent, by riding 100 miles in just under 4 hours.

In January 2016, several Cruzbike riders entered the Bike Sebring race, held at the Sebring Raceway. Kevin Gambill set a course record for the 12-hour division, riding 276.6 miles on a Vendetta (V20).

== Models ==
- Q45
- T50
- S40 (formerly Silvio)
- V20 (formerly Vendetta)

The number in the model name indicates the backrest angle (Q45 and T50 are adjustable). T50 has option for electrification. Previous models include the Sofrider, Quest, QX559, QX100, and the conversion kit.

== See also ==
- List of bicycle manufacturers
