= David Gordon Wilson =

UK-American engineer (1928–2019)

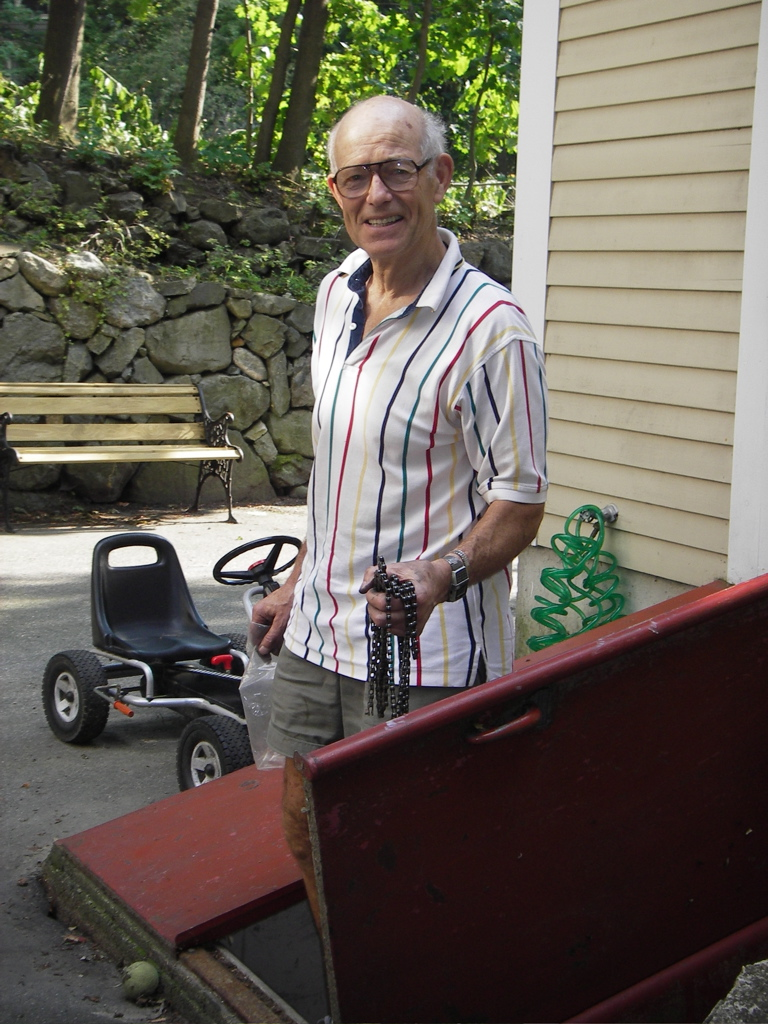
David Gordon Wilson outside his home workshop, 2005

David Gordon Wilson (11 February 1928 – 2 May 2019) was a British-born engineer who served as a professor of engineering at the Massachusetts Institute of Technology (MIT) in the United States.

Born in Warwickshire, England, Wilson went to the US on a post-doctoral fellowship in 1955. He returned to Britain in 1957 to work in the gas-turbine industry. He taught engineering in Nigeria from 1958 to 1960. He started a branch of a US company in London and in 1961 was moved to the US. In 1966 he joined the MIT faculty and taught engineering design, wrote two textbooks on his specialty gas-turbine design with co-authors and also pursued a long-standing interest into human-powered transport, coauthoring Bicycling Science. He is credited, along with Chester Kyle, with starting the modern recumbent bicycle movement in the US. Wilson was a board member of the International Human Powered Vehicle Association from 1977 through 1993, its president in 1984, and was editor and frequent author of its journal Human Power from 1984 through 2001.

In 1980, Wilson and Richard Forrestall developed a recumbent bicycle, the Avatar 2000. In 1982, Tim Gartside (Australia) rode a fully faired version as the Avatar Bluebell (UK) in a US event to a world record of 51.9 mph for 200 metres with a flying start.

Wilson held more than 60 patents; in 1982, he told the Boston Globe, "It’s a bit of a pain that all I’m known for is the bike. I’m very keen on some of the other things I do." He was also active in environmental causes, proposing a forerunner to the carbon tax in 1973, and leading a group that called for a smoking ban in public places.

In 2001, Wilson and Bruce co-founded Wilson TurboPower to commercialise two energy technologies developed at the Massachusetts Institute of Technology (MIT)—the Wilson Heat Exchanger, for which the company received $500,000 in funding from the Massachusetts Technology Collaborative in 2008, and the Wilson Microturbine, which was described as a "high-performance 300 kW microturbine [that] will dramatically improve energy economics by producing over 50% electrical efficiency." In 2010, the company changed its name and its focus, becoming the Wilson Solarpower Corporation.

Wilson lived in Winchester, Massachusetts with his second wife, Ellen.

== Notable publications ==
- Wilson, David Gordon; Schmidt, Theodor; et al. (May 2020). Bicycling Science (4th paperback ed.). Cambridge, MA: The MIT Press.
- Wilson, David Gordon; Korakianitis, Theodosios (September 2014). The Design of High-Efficiency Turbomachinery and Gas Turbines (2nd paperback ed.). Prentice Hall. ISBN 978-0-13-312000-4.
- Beck, Douglas; Wilson, David Gordon (January 1996). Gas-Turbine Regenerators (hardcover ed.). Springer. ISBN 978-0-412-98331-3.

== Memoirs ==
- Wilson, David Gordon (April 2018). Born, Blessed and Blitzed in Britain, but Battered by MIT (paperback ed.). West Wareham, MA: Omni Publishing Co. ISBN 978-1-928-75800-6.
