= X-seam =

Human body measurement

A person's X-seam is a measurement related to the person's height. It is measured from a sitting position with legs outstretched, and is the distance from the lower back to the soles of the feet. X-seam measurements are used for sizing recumbent bicycles and ultralight aircraft.
