= Crank forward =

Type of bicycle

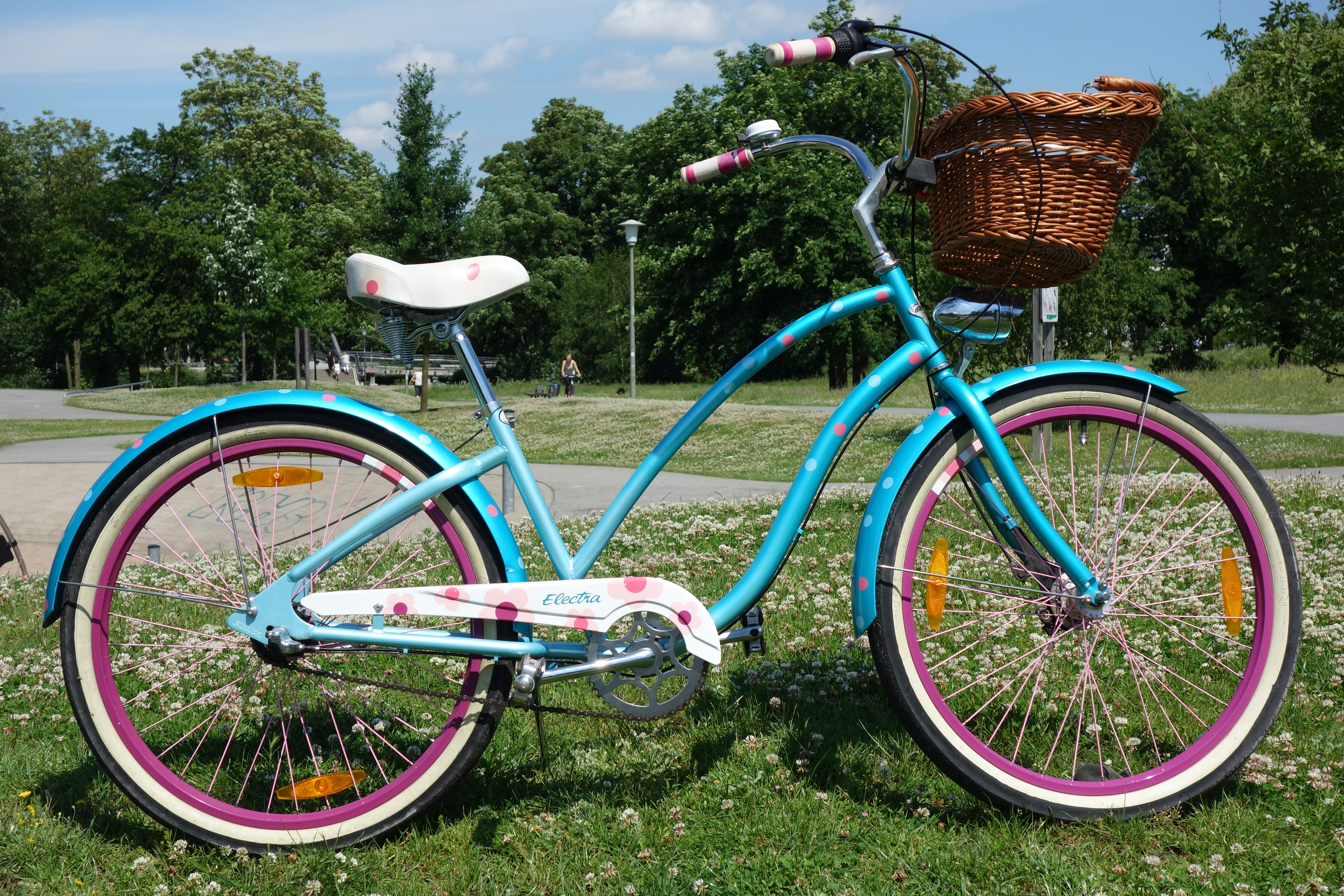
Lady bike, beach cruiser by Electra Bicycle Company

A crank forward bicycle has the bottom bracket and cranks set further forward, relative to the seat, than a traditional upright bicycle. Bicycles of this type are also called easy bikes/EZBs, flat foot bikes (from Electra's 'Flat Foot Technology'), laid back bikes, semi-recumbent/semi-bent bikes and ground-reach bikes (Lightfoot Cycles).

The term "crank forward" was created by Rans Designs, formerly a manufacturer of bicycles based in Hays, Kansas. It was a protected term that Rans used for a model of bicycles which they had manufactured, but has been genericized by the bicycle community to describe bikes with such characteristics.

The main functional difference of a crank forward bicycle is that the seat can be set closer to the ground while maintaining the correct leg extension to the pedals. This allows the rider to place their feet on the ground without getting off the seat. The crank is not so far forward, though, that a seat back is necessary, as in a semi-recumbent or recumbent bike.

== Examples ==
Commercially available examples in 2009 :

Electra Townie and Amsterdam series; Day 6 Comfort Bicycles, the Giant Suede, the Trek Pure, the K2 Big Easy, the Sun Bicycles Ruskin and Rover, and the Rans Fusion.

The following bicycles were commercially available in the United States in model year 2007:

From Rans the Fusion, Cruz, Dynamik, Citi, 700X and Zenetik; from Electra the Townie series; from Lightfoot Cycles the Surefoot, from K2 the Big Easy series; from TREK the Pure series; from Cannondale the Daytripper series; from DelSol the LowBoy series; from Raleigh the Gruv series; from Giant the Suede series; from Sun the Drifter; and from Sims the Sea Breeze.
