= Sam Whittingham =

Canadian cyclist

Sam Whittingham is a Canadian cyclist who has held several world records on recumbent bicycles.

== Records ==
As of 2009, he held the following world records under the sanction of the International Human Powered Vehicle Association:

- The 200 m flying start (single rider, World Human Powered Speed Challenge, Battle Mountain, NV): 133.284 km/h (82.819 mph) on 2009-09-18.
- First unpaced cyclist ever to break the deci-mach mark (1/10 the speed of sound, World Human Powered Speed Challenge, Battle Mountain, NV): 132.50 km/h (82.33 mph) on 2008-09-18. To date (2021), only four other persons (Sebastiaan Bowier, Andrea Gallo, Fabien Canal and Todd Reichert) have accomplished this milestone.
- The 1000 m flying start (single rider): 128.40 km/h (79.79 mph) on 2001-10-06.
- The 1 mile flying start (single rider): 126.55 km/h (78.64 mph) on 2001-10-06.
- The hour record: 90.724 km (56.373 mi) on 2009-07-17.

In 1993 he also held the record for the 200 m flying start (multiple rider).

== Designer ==
Sam Whittingham is founder, designer and builder for Naked Bicycles, a custom bicycle and accessory fabrication company based on Quadra Island, British Columbia, Canada. The company was originally named Forte bicycles before a name change in April 2006.

Whittingham won the President's Award, the People's Choice Award and the Best of Show Award at the 2008 North American Handmade Bicycle Show in Portland, Oregon with an ornate fixed-gear bicycle that blended 1890s-style wooden rims and grips with modern hubs and a front disk brake. This bike was then sold to Lance Armstrong.

== Personal life ==
Sam Whittingham is the grandson of screenwriter Jack Whittingham, who wrote the first James Bond screenplay.

He currently resides on Quadra Island, British Columbia, Canada with his family of four.

== See also ==
- Cycling records
