= Maria Parker =

American cyclist (born 1963)

Maria Parker (born February 7, 1963) is an American long-distance cyclist and the holder of multiple cycling records. She is also the founder of 3000 Miles to a Cure, an organization to raise money for Accelerate Brain Cancer Cure.

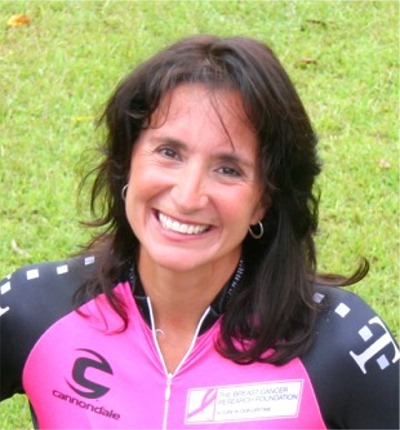
Maria Parker, ultracyclist

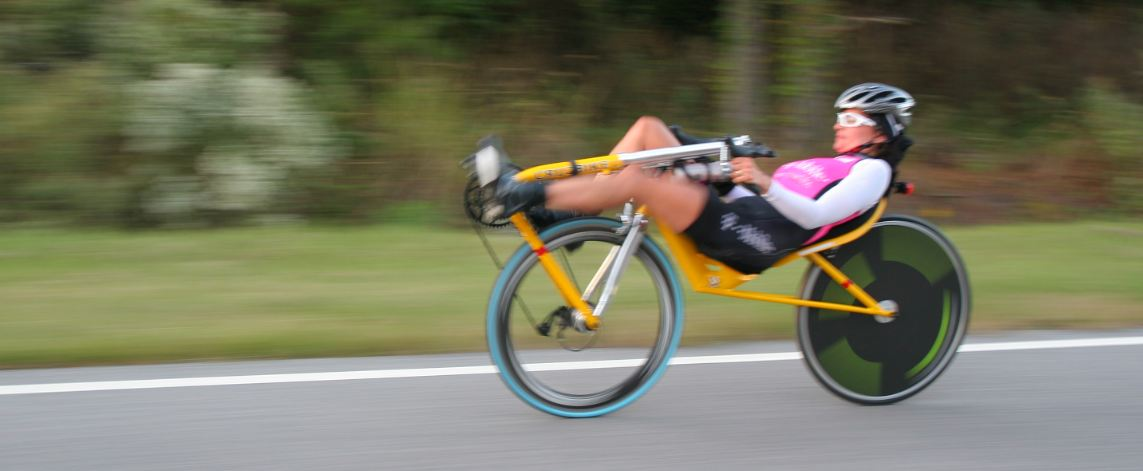
Maria Parker setting the 24-hour world record on the Cruzbike Vendetta recumbent bicycle

== Records ==
Parker rides a front-wheel drive Cruzbike recumbent bicycle and holds the:

- 24-hour road record: 469.198 miles (19.550 mph)
- 12-hour road record: 257.804 miles (21.48 mph)
- 200-mile road record : 9:17:03.0 (21.54 mph)
- 100-mile road record: 4:27:19 (22.45 mph)

=== Other cycling achievements ===
- 2012 National 24 Hour Challenge: Set women's recumbent course record (still standing as of 2016) with 407.9 miles
- 2012 Bike Sebring: 1st among male and female competitors in RAAM qualifier with 474.5 miles
- 2013 Race Across America: 1st female finisher. Over-50 Recumbent Women's Course Record, exceeding women's standard bike record by approximately 16 hours. 3002 miles in 11 days, 20 hours, and 54 minutes.
- 2015 Hoodoo 500 Solo Race, St. George, Utah, First Recumbent Female to ever finish. 46 hours, 20 minutes.
- 2015 Assault On Mt. Mitchell, Spartanburg, South Carolina, 6:58:57, Fastest Recorded Time for a Female Recumbent. 102.7 Miles, 10,357 Feet Climbing.
- 2015 Calvin's Challenge UMCA National 12 Hour Championship, Springfield, Ohio, 257 Miles, Course Record for Recumbent and also exceeding standard female record.
- 2016 Bessie's Creek 24 Hour, Brookshire, Texas, 458 miles (non-drafting). Course record, exceeding course records for both men and women on recumbent and standard road bikes.

== 3000 Miles to a Cure ==
In October 2012, after her sister was diagnosed with Stage IV brain cancer, Parker helped found 3000 Miles to a Cure, a brain cancer research funding organization with a goal of raising 1 million dollars to support brain cancer research.

=== 2013 Race Across America ===
As part of 3000 Miles to Cure's fundraising efforts, Parker participated in Race Across America, the 3000 mile cross-country bike race, in 2013. Parker won the race, despite facing setbacks early on. 612 miles into the 3000 mile race, her follow vehicle was rear-ended by a texting driver outside of Tuba City, Arizona, and several crew members, including Parker's son, suffered minor injuries. In addition, her backup bikes and primary follow vehicle were destroyed, and Parker withdrew from the race. However, after a 24-hour break, Parker resolved to continue the 3000 mile ride, believing that she would be disqualified for missing a time cut-off. Upon resuming her ride, the Race Across America organization forgave the time cutoff that would have disqualified Parker, and allowed her to re-enter the ride as an official racer.

After returning to the race, Parker quickly climbed the women's field, performing what RAAM commentator David Towle called "one of the greatest rides in Race Across America history". Helped by six-time RAAM winner Seana Hogan's early withdrawal (due to respiratory problems), Parker finished first in the women's field with a time of 11 days, 20 hours, and 54 minutes.
