= Barbara Buatois =

French cyclist

Barbara Buatois (born 24 August 1977) is a French racing cyclist and one of the fastest female recumbent racers and ultra cyclists.

Buatois was born in Oullins. She rides recumbent bikes over the complete world HPV Championships as well as long distance events such as Raid Provence Extreme and Bordeaux–Paris. She won Race Across America 2010 (One stage 3,000-mile (4,800 km) race) on a Recumbent Bicycle.

== Records ==
In 2009 she beat the women's world speed record for a 200-meter flying start speed trial, reaching 121.44 km/h (75.46 mph) at Battle Mountain, USA, in 2009, riding a streamlined recumbent bicycle. The previous record holder for this same category was Lisa Vetterlein who reached 107.16 km/h (66.59 mph) in 2005.

Her other records are:

- One hour : 84.02 km with a fully faired recumbent bicycle, a Varna Tempest
- One hour : 66.042 km with fully faired recumbent tricycle, the Varna 24
- One hour : 46.376 km unfaired
- 1000m standing start : 1.13,7 unfaired
- 200m flying start : 12,71 unfaired
- 12h road : 347 km unfaired 2600m + climbing

== Achievements ==
2004

- European Recumbent Championships : 1st Tandem

2005

- Cyclevision European Championships: 1st
- World Recumbent Championships: 3rd

2006

- Cyclevision European Championships: 1st
- World Recumbent Championships: 1st
- Bordeaux Paris 625 km Race : 2nd in 26 hours 15 minutes.

2007

- Cyclevision European Championships: 1st Unfaired
- SaintéLyon 69 km Trail : 3rd in woman teams of 3 runners
- FFC French Recumbent Championships : 6th overall ( only lady )
- World Recumbent Championships: 1st
- Paris–Brest–Paris 2007 : First Back to back tandem finisher in PBP history. 87 hours

2008

- Paris Half Marathon : 31st place ( 3900 contestants ) 1 h 33
- FFC French Recumbent Championships : 3rd place overall ( only lady )
- Bordeaux Paris 625 km Race : 1st Place 21 hours 51 minutes.( 44th overall, 2500 contestants )
- FFC French Recumbent Track Champion 2008

2009

- Paris Half Marathon : 31st place again ! ( 4900 contestant ) 1 h 31
- Raid Provence Extrème : First recumbent bike finisher in RPE history ! 29 hours 46 minutes for 610 km and 10 000m +climbing
- World Recumbent championships : 1st
- Hour World Record : 84.02 km
- 100 km World Record 80.64 km avg.
- 200m flying start, world record :121, 44 km/h

== See also ==
- Cycling records
