= World Human Powered Vehicle Association =

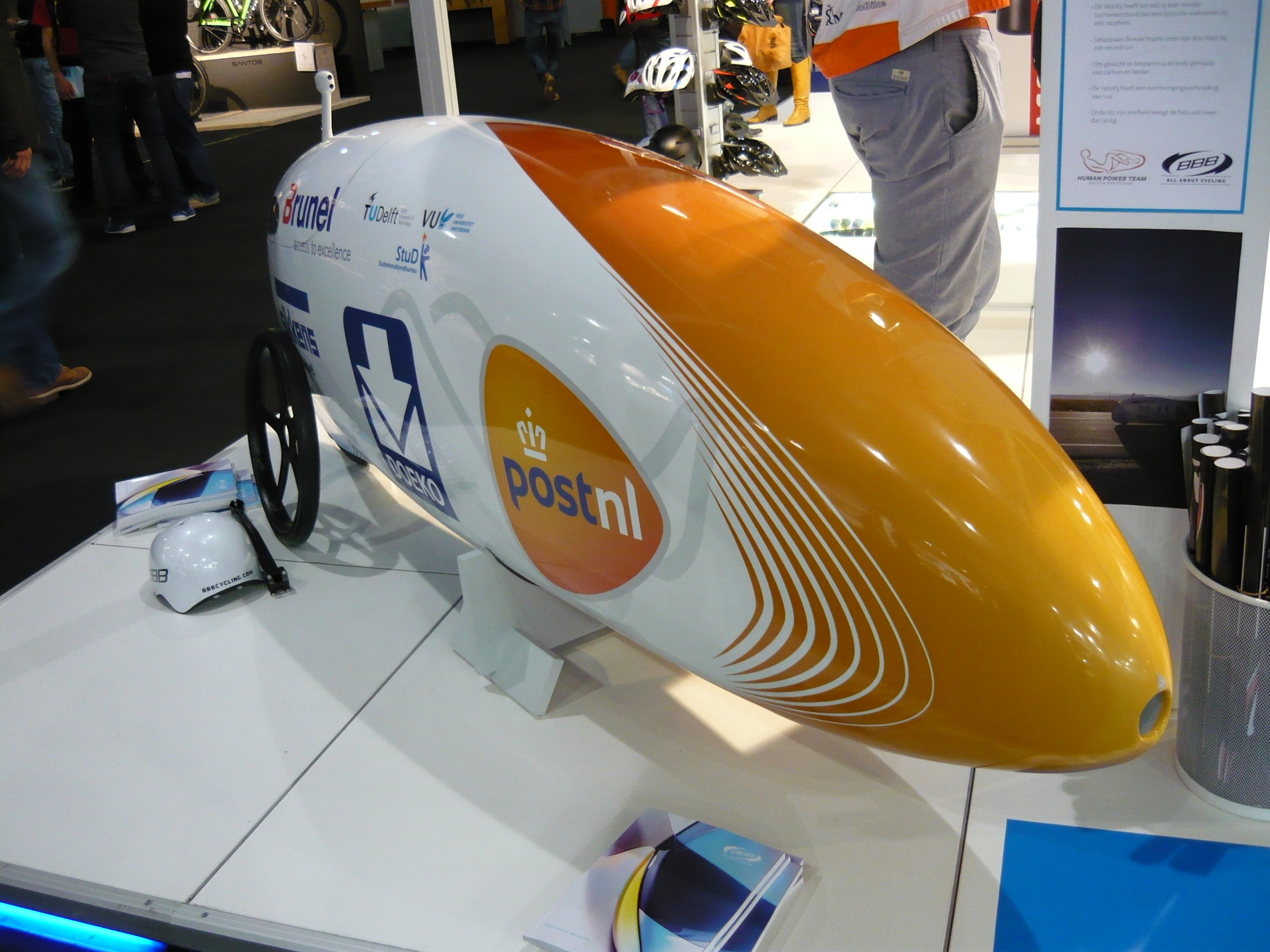
VeloX3 in which Sebastiaan Bowier broke the International Human Powered Vehicle Association record with a speed of 133.78 kilometres per hour (83.13 mph) over a 200 metres (660 ft) stretch of road on 15 September 2013, World Human Powered Speed Chall

The World Human Powered Vehicle Association is dedicated to promoting the design and development of human-powered vehicles. Its main focus is coordinating between national HPV clubs with regard to competitions and records. The WHPVA also supports the Human Power eJournal, with a broader focus including stationary uses of human power.

== History ==
The WHPVA was originally called the IHPVA (International Human Powered Vehicle Association), which was founded in 1976 in the USA and was for many years an association of individual members. In 1997 the IHPVA was reorganized into an international association with national organizations as members and an American association which adopted the name Human Powered Vehicle Association HPVA.

Due to conflicts regarding record keeping and copyrights, the HPVA left the IHPVA in 2004. In 2008 the HPVA decided to rename itself to IHPVA while the IHPVA of this time decided to keep its name, resulting in two organizations with the same name.

In a hostile takeover, the American IHPVA also seized control of the domain name ihpva.org away from the international IHPVA. The IHPVA tried to regain its domain by appealing to the ICANNs ombudsman but was unsuccessful and in 2009 itself renamed to WHPVA.

== WHPVA records ==
The WHPVA maintains speed and distance records for various times and distances for land, water and air vehicles. The best hour record is currently held by Francesco Russo of Switzerland with a total distance of 92.43 km (57.43 mi). Since 2009, this recordbase has forked from the previously identical one of the IHPVA.
