= Recumbent bicycle =

Type of bicycle

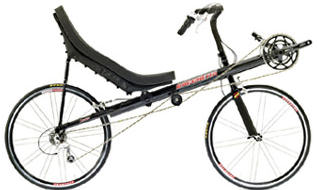
- Bacchetta Corsa, a medium-wheelbase high racer
- Classification: Vehicle
- Application: Transportation
- Fuel source: Human-power, Motor-power
- Wheels: 2-4
- Tracks: 1-3
- Aerofoils: NACA
- Axles: 2
- Components: Frame, Wheels, Tires, Saddle, Handlebar, Pedals, Drivetrain
- Invented: 19th century
- Variations: Mountain bike, Lowracer, Highracer, Semi-recumbent, Folding, Tandem, Recumbent tricycle, Handcycle, Hand-and-foot recumbent tricycle, Recumbent quadracycle, Stationary
- Wheelbase: Long, Short, Compact long wheelbase, Convertible
- Steering: Under-seat, Over-seat, Center steering
- Drive: Rear wheel drive, Front wheel drive
- Suspension: Coil, Elastomer, Air-sprung
- Seat: Mesh, Foam

A recumbent bicycle is a bicycle that places the rider in a laid-back reclining position, and often called a human-powered vehicle or HPV, especially if it has an aerodynamic fairing. Recumbents are available in a wide range of configurations, including: long to short wheelbase; large, small, or a mix of wheel sizes; overseat, underseat, or no-hands steering; and rear wheel or front wheel drive. A variant with three wheels is a recumbent tricycle, with four wheels a quadracycle.

Speed recumbents are generally faster than upright bicycles, but they were banned by the Union Cycliste Internationale (UCI) in 1934. Recumbent races and records are now overseen by the World Human Powered Vehicle Association (WHPVA), International Human Powered Vehicle Association (IHPVA) and World Recumbent Racing Association (WRRA).

Some recumbent riders may choose this type of design for ergonomic reasons: the rider's weight is distributed comfortably over a larger area, supported by back and buttocks. On a traditional upright bicycle, the body weight rests entirely on a small portion of the sitting bones, the feet, and the hands. Others may choose a recumbent because some models also have an aerodynamic advantage; the reclined, legs-forward position of the rider's body presents a smaller frontal profile.

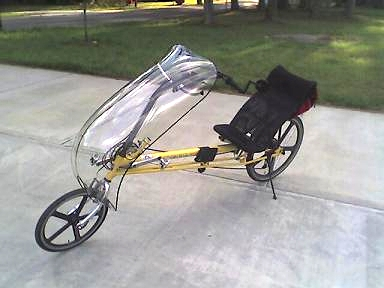
A RANS V2 Formula long-wheelbase recumbent bike fitted with a front fairing

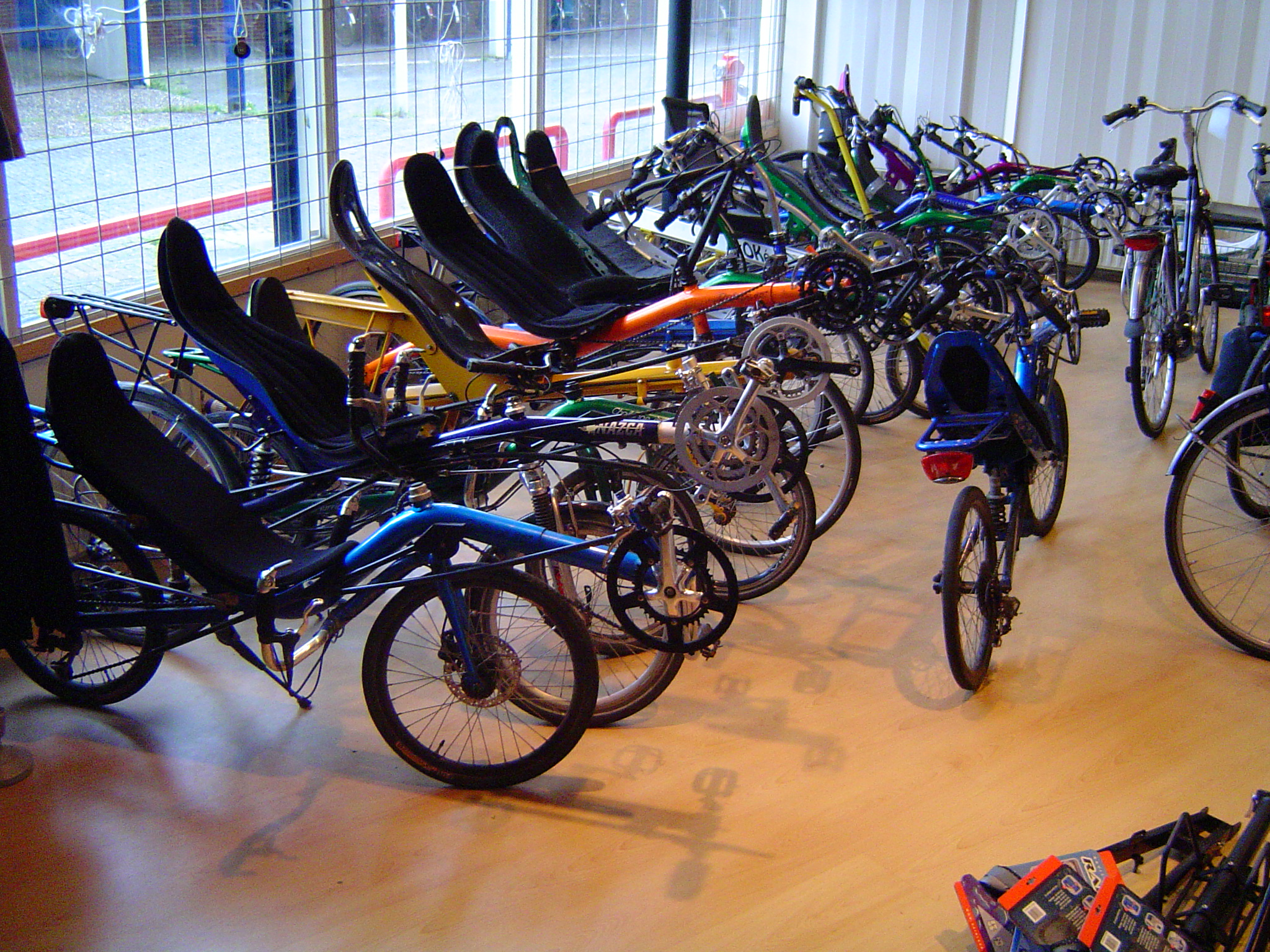
Shop for recumbents in Nijmegen, Netherlands

== Description ==
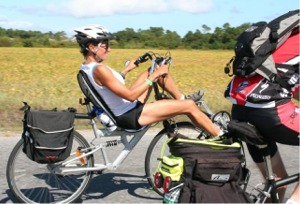
Woman riding a Cruzbike Sofrider (PBFWD recumbent) near the end of the 500-mile (800 km) "Ride Across North Carolina" 2007

Recumbents can be categorized by their wheelbase, wheel sizes, steering system, faired or unfaired, and front-wheel or rear-wheel drive.

=== Wheelbase ===
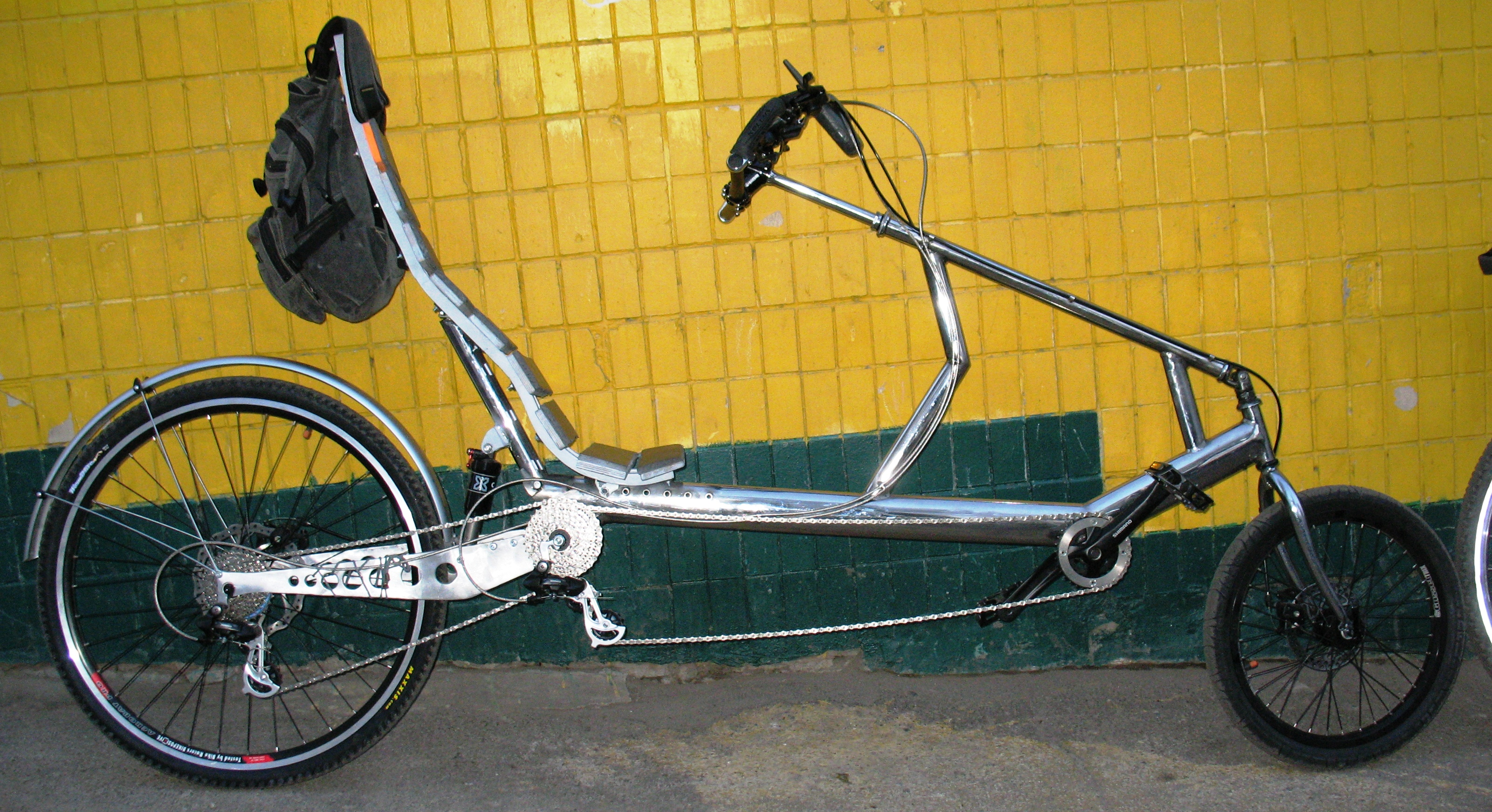
Long-wheel-base recumbent with steering u-joint (UA)

Long-wheelbase (LWB) models have the pedals located between the front and rear wheels; short (SWB) and medium-wheelbase (MWB) models have the pedals in front of the front wheel; compact long-wheelbase (CLWB) models have the pedals either very close to the front wheel or above it. Bikes with wheelbase less than 42 inches are classified as SWB, above 42 inches are MWB. Within these categories are variations, intermediate types, and even convertible designs (LWB to CLWB) –there is no "standard" recumbent.

=== Wheel sizes ===
The rear wheel of a recumbent is usually behind the rider and may be any size, from around 16 inches (410 mm) to the 700c (or 27 inches (690 mm) on some older models, as on upright road bikes of that time) of an upright racing cycle. The front wheel is commonly smaller than the rear, although a number of recumbents feature dual 26-inch (ISO 559), 650c (ISO 571), 700c (ISO 622), or even 29-by-4-inch (740 mm × 100 mm) oversize all-terrain tires. Given the smaller front wheel, loss of steering and control are somewhat more likely attempting sharp or quick changes of direction while crossing over patches of loose dirt, sand or pebbles.

Larger diameter wheels of the same type casing construction generally have lower rolling resistance but a higher profile leading to higher air resistance. High-racer aficionados also claim that they are more stable, and although it is easier to balance a bicycle with a higher center of mass, the wide variety of recumbent designs makes such generalizations unreliable. Another advantage of both wheels being the same size is that the bike requires only one size of inner tube.

One common arrangement is an ISO 559 (26-inch) rear wheel and an ISO 406 or ISO 451 (20-inch) front wheel. The small front wheel helps to keep the pedals and front wheel clear of each other, avoiding the problem on a medium wheelbase recumbents called "heel strike" (where the rider's heels catch the wheel in slow speed, small radius turns). Pedal extenders combined with a 20-inch front wheel eliminate any heel strike issue on MWB bikes.

A pivoting-boom front-wheel drive (PBFWD aka moving bottom bracket recumbent) also overcomes heel strike since the pedals and front wheel turn together. PBFWD bikes may have dual 26-inch (660 mm) wheels or larger.

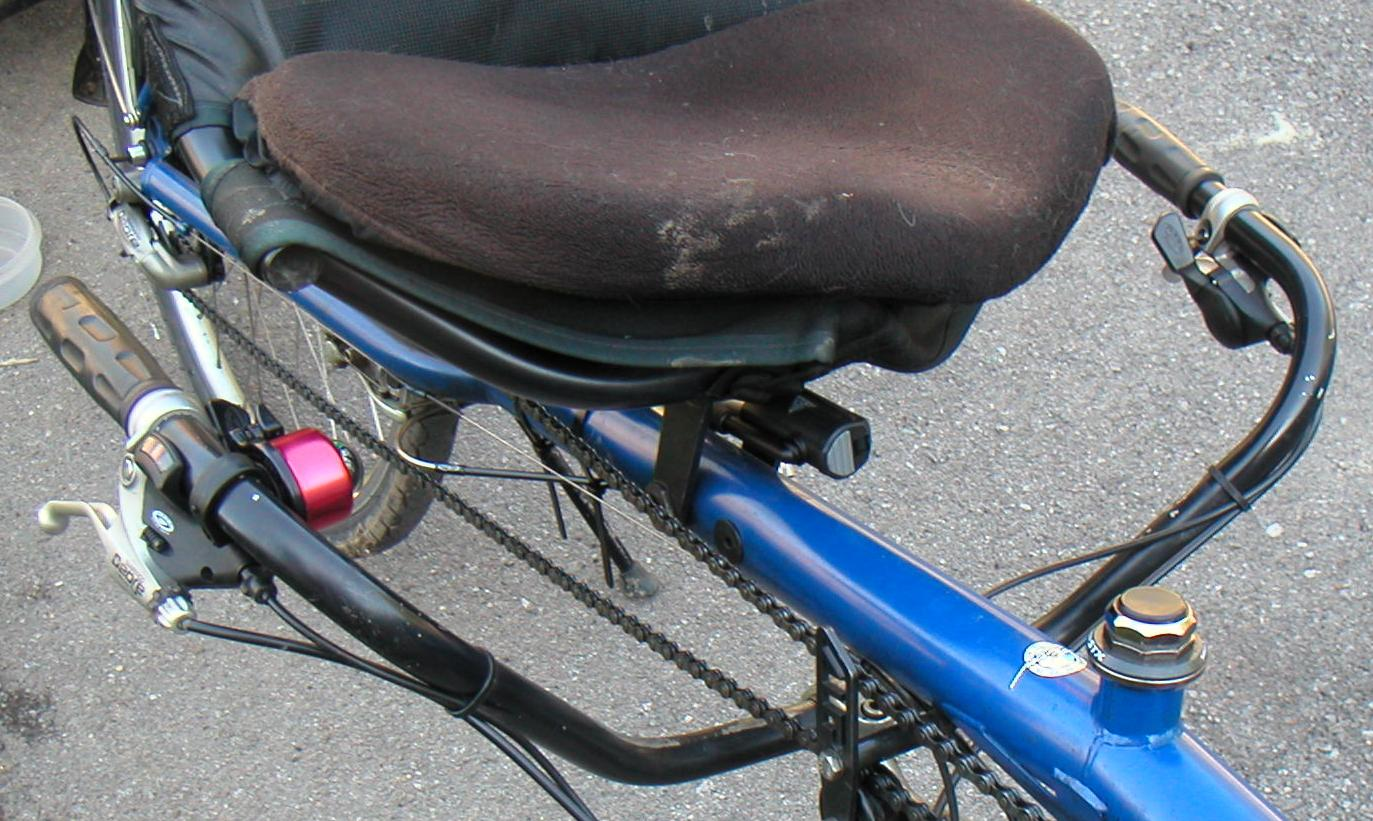
Handlebar setup for under-seat steering (USS)

=== Steering ===
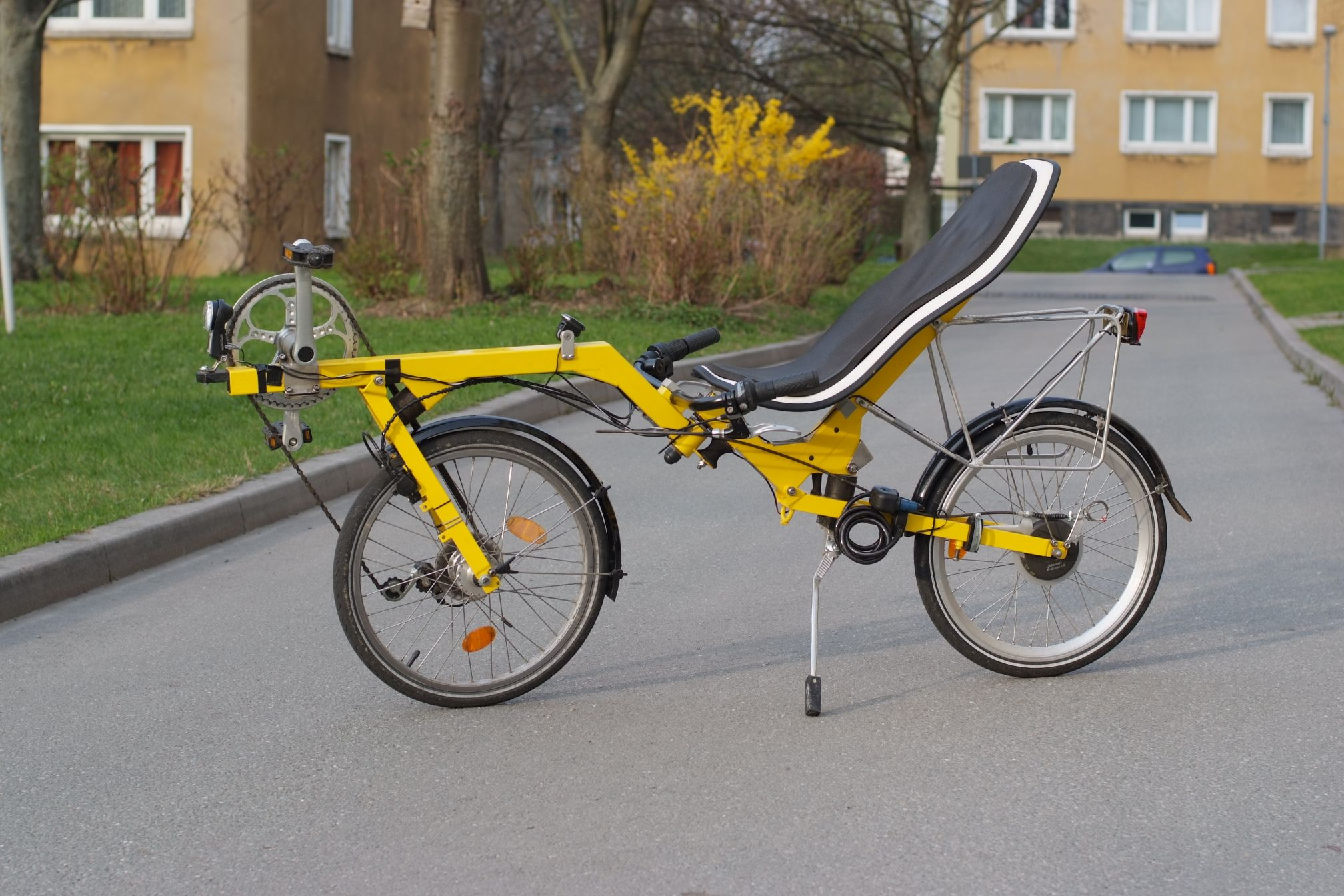
A Flevobike showing pivot steering (and FWD)

Steering for recumbent bikes can be generally categorized as

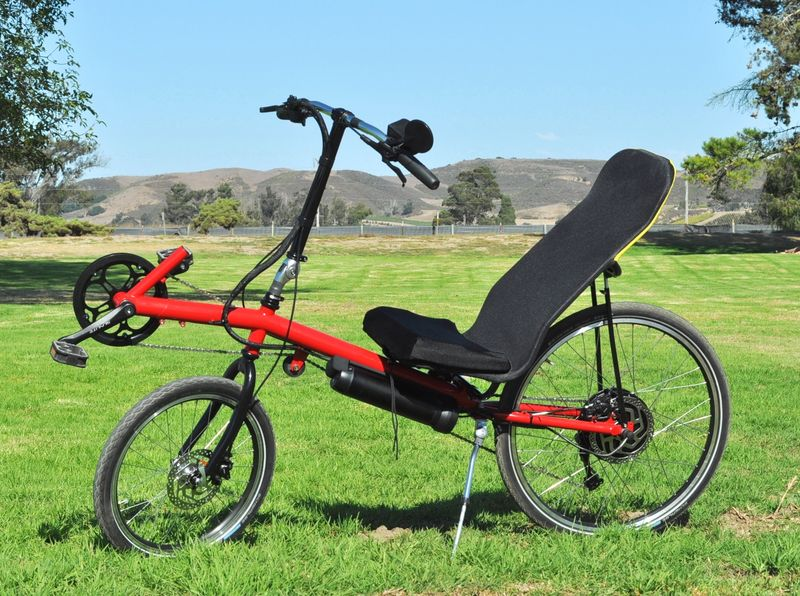
Lightning Phantom with OSS

- Over-seat (OSS);
- Under-seat (USS); or
- Center steering or pivot steering.

OSS is generally direct—the steerer acts on the front fork like a standard bicycle handlebar—but the bars themselves may extend well behind the front wheel (more like a tiller); alternatively the bars might have long rearward extensions (sometimes known as Superman or Kingcycle bars). Chopper-style bars are sometimes seen on LWB bikes.

USS is usually indirect—the bars link to the headset through a system of rods or cables and possibly a bell crank. Most tadpole trikes are USS.

Center steered or pivot steered recumbents, such as Pythons, may have no handlebars at all.

In addition, some trikes such as the Sidewinder have used rear-wheel steer, instead of the more common front-wheel steer. They can provide good maneuverability at low speeds, but have been reported to be potentially unstable at speeds above 25 mph (40 km/h).

=== Drive ===
Most recumbents have the cranks attached to a boom fixed to the frame, with a long drive chain for rear wheel drive. However, due to the proximity of the crank to the front wheel, front wheel drive (FWD) can be an option, and it allows for a much shorter chain. One style requires the chain to twist slightly to allow for steering.

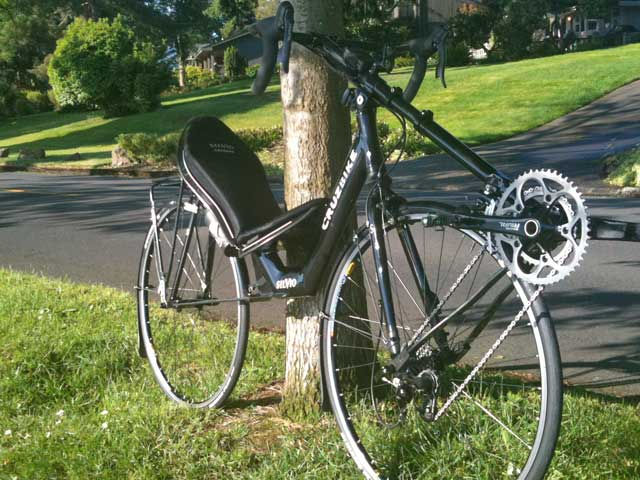
Cruzbike Silvio (2009) A moving (pivoting) bottom bracket, front wheel-drive, 700C road bike (with rear rack).

Another style, pivoting-boom FWD (PBFWD), has the crankset connected to and moving with the front fork. In addition to the much shorter chain, the advantages to PBFWD are use of a larger front wheel for lower rolling resistance.

The main disadvantage to all FWD designs is "wheelspin" when climbing steep hills covered with loose gravel, slick pavement, etc. Another disadvantage of PBFWD for some riders is a slightly longer "learning curve" due to adaptation to the pedal-steer effect (forces applied to the pedal can actually steer the bike). Beginner riders tend to swerve along a serpentine path until they adapt a balanced pedal motion. After adaptation, a PBFWD recumbent can be ridden in a straight line as any other bike, and can even be steered with the feet only. However this requires pedal force applied at an angle, resulting in a power loss greater than the long chain on MWB recumbent. Cruzbike is the only PBFWD recumbent currently in production, and features a traditional steering axis similar to most standard and recumbent bikes.

Yet another drive-train variation is on rowing cycles where the rider rows using arms and legs.

=== Fully suspended bikes ===
Modern recumbent bikes are increasingly being fitted with front and rear suspension systems for increased comfort and traction on rough surfaces. Coil, elastomer, and air-sprung suspension systems have all been used on recumbent bikes, with oil or air-damping in the forks and rear shock absorbers. The maturation of fully suspended conventional mountain bikes has aided the development of these designs, which often use many of the same parts, suitably modified for recumbent use.

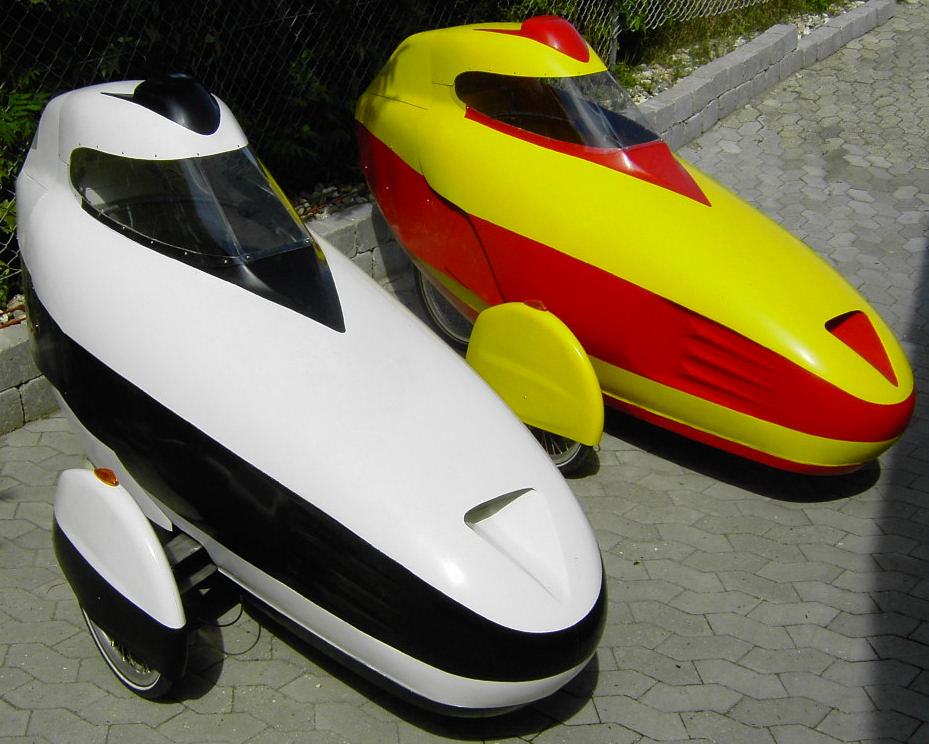
Leitra Velomobiles

=== Fairings ===
Some riders fit their bikes with aerodynamic devices called fairings. These can reduce aerodynamic drag and help keep the rider warmer and drier in cold and wet weather. Fairings are also available for upright bikes, but are much less common. Fully enclosed bikes and trikes are considered velomobiles.

=== Seats ===
The seats themselves are either of mesh stretched tightly over a frame or foam cushions over hard shells like the Stinger pictured, which might be moulded or assembled from sheet materials. Hard-shell seats predominate in Europe, mesh seats in the USA.

== Variations ==
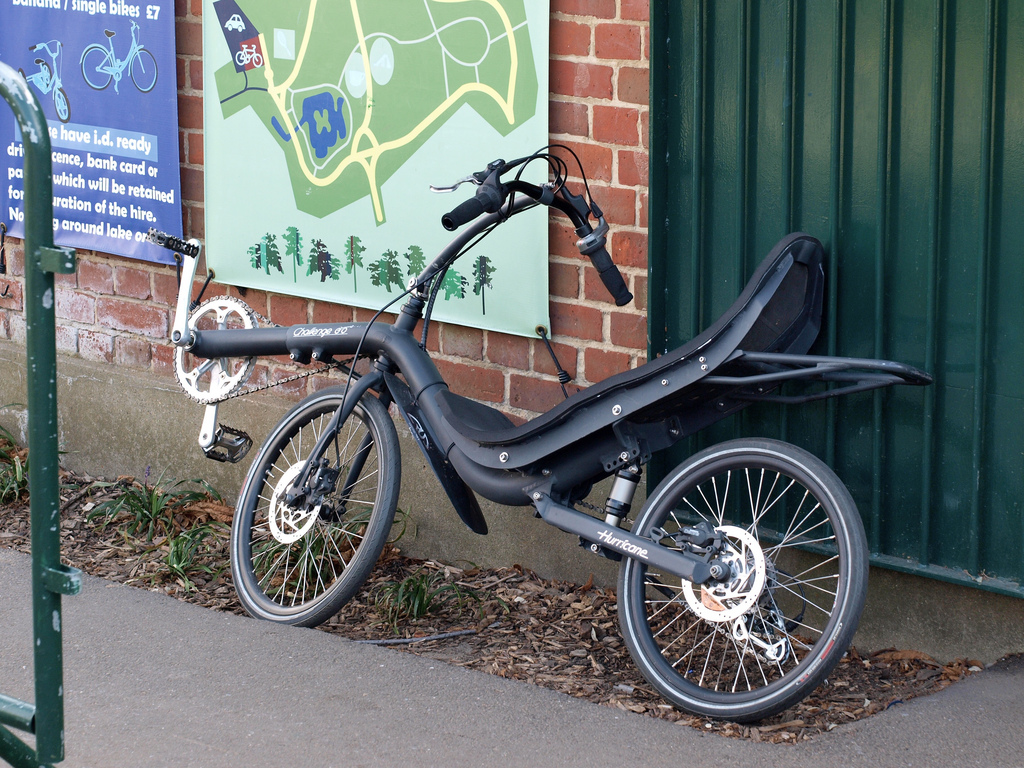
Challenge Hurricane: a mid-racer.

=== Mountain bike recumbents ===
With the right equipment and design, recumbent bikes can be used for riding unpaved roads and offroad, just as with conventional mountain bikes. Because of their longer wheelbase and the manner in which the rider is confined to the seat, recumbents are not as easy to use on tight, curving unpaved singletrack. Large-diameter wheels, mountain gearing and off-road specific design have been used since 1999. Crank-forward designs that facilitate climbing out of the saddle, such as the RANS Dynamik, also can be used off-road.

=== Lowracers ===
Lowracers are a type of recumbent more common in Europe among racing enthusiasts. These typically have two 20-inch (510 mm) wheels or a 26-inch (660 mm) wheel at the rear and 20-inch wheel at the front. The seat is positioned between the wheels rather than above them. The extreme reclined position, and the fact that the rider is sitting in line with the wheels rather than atop them, makes this type the most aerodynamic of unfaired recumbents.

=== Highracers ===
Highracers are distinguished by using two large wheels (usually ISO 559, 650c or 700c). This necessitates a higher bottom bracket than on a lowracer so that the rider's legs are above the front wheel, and this in turn requires a higher seat. The seating position may be otherwise identical to that on a lowracer allowing similar aerodynamics. "Racer" in the name implies that this will often be the case, since these bikes strive for speed.

Highracers are generally more maneuverable than lowracers since their higher center of mass make them easier to balance at lower speeds. Given the same seating position they may be faster than lowracers, since it is widely believed that rolling resistance is inversely proportional to wheel diameter. However, lowracer proponents reply that their design is faster due to aerodynamics. The reasoning is that the riders body is in line with the wheels, reducing drag.

Hip and elbow injuries are more common on highracers than on lowracers due to the greater height from which the rider can fall. However, the injuries are very rare and seldom serious.

=== Semi-recumbent and crank forward bicycles ===
Bicycles that use positions intermediate between a conventional upright and a recumbent are called semi-recumbent or crank forward designs. These generally are intended for casual use and have comfort and ease of use as primary objectives, with aerodynamics sacrificed for this purpose.

=== Tandem recumbents ===
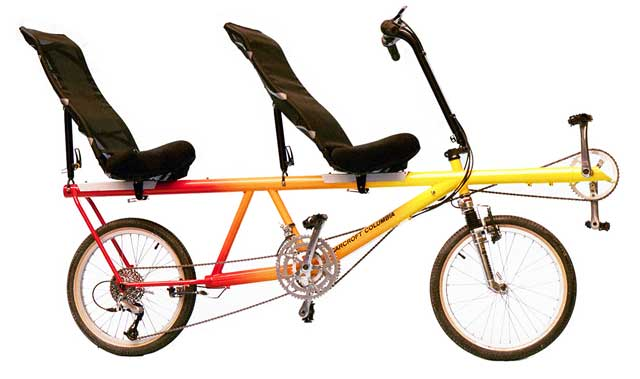
This Barcroft Columbia is an example of how a tandem recumbent can be fitted within a compact layout for easy transport.

Just as with upright bicycles, recumbents are built and marketed with more than one seat, thus combining the advantages of recumbents with those of tandem bicycles. In order to keep the wheelbase from being any longer than absolutely necessary, tandem recumbents often place the stoker's crankset under the captain's seat. A common configuration for two riders in the recumbent position is the sociable tandem, wherein the two riders ride side by side. There are also hybrid recumbent designs such as the Hase Pino Allround that use a recumbent stoker in the front, and an upright pilot in the rear.

=== Recumbent tricycles ===
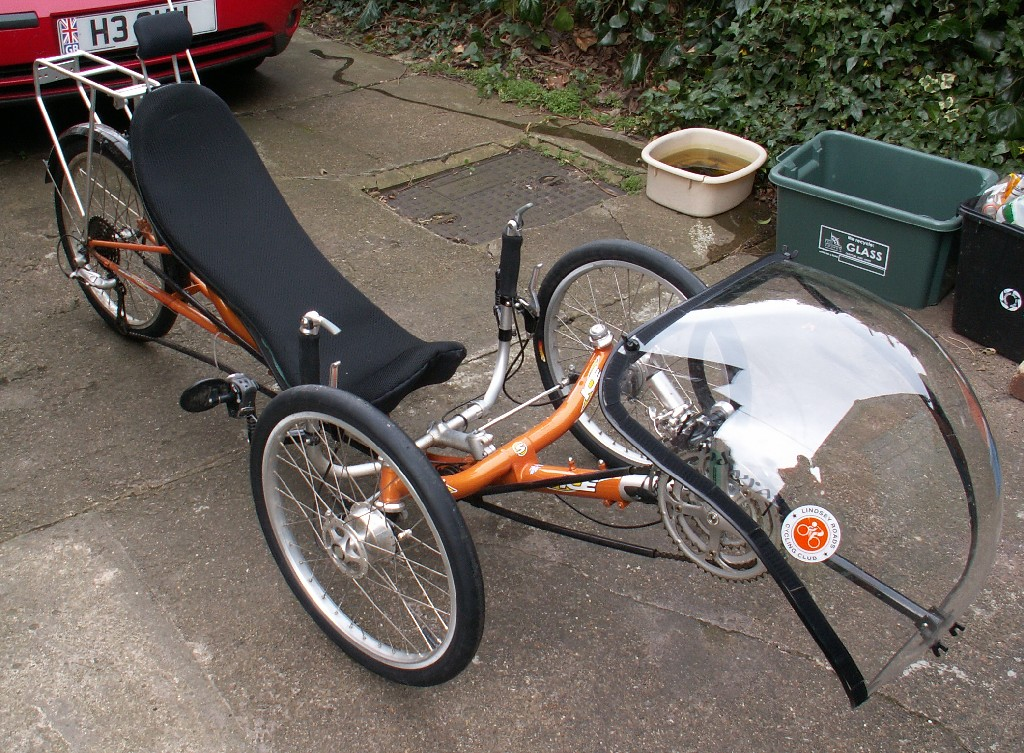
A tadpole recumbent tricycle made by Inspired Cycle Engineering with a transparent front fairing

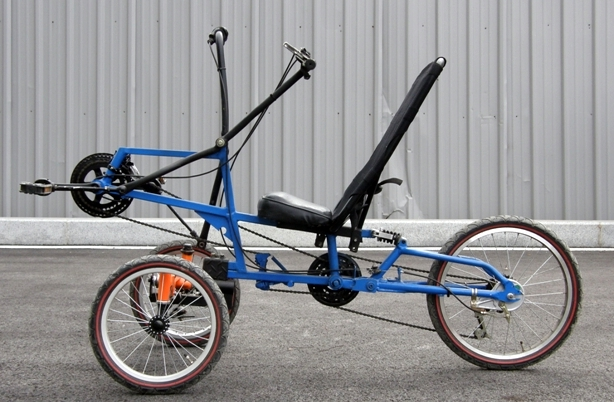
Hand and foot recumbent tricycle

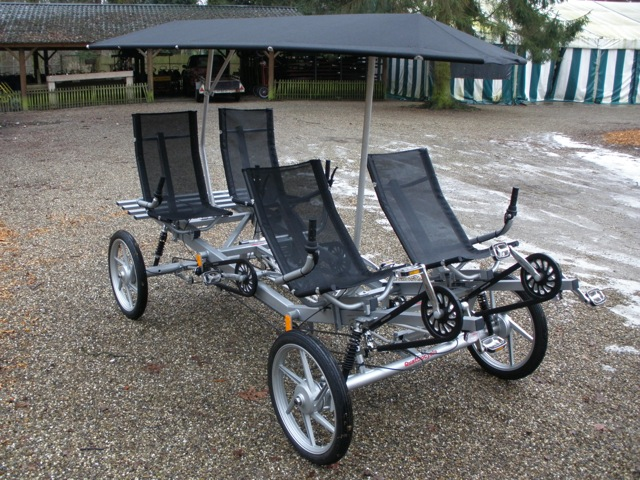
A modern touring 4-wheel recumbent quadracycle – a 2011 model Quattrocycle four seater with canopy

Recumbent tricycles (trikes) are closely related to recumbent bicycles, but have three wheels instead of two. The three wheels can be arranged in two ways: delta trikes have one front wheel and two rear wheels, while tadpole trikes have two front wheels and one rear wheel.

==== Handcycles ====
In order to accommodate paraplegics and other individuals with little or no use of their legs, many manufacturers have designed and released hand-powered recumbent trikes, or handcycles. Handcycles are a regular sight at human powered vehicle (HPV) meetings and are beginning to be seen on the streets. They usually follow a delta design with front wheels driven by standard derailleur gearing powered by hand cranks. Brake levers are usually mounted on the hand holds, which are usually set with no offset rather than the 180° of pedal cranks. The entire crank assembly and the front wheel turn together, allowing the rider to steer and crank simultaneously.

Although arms are weaker than legs, many hand cyclists are able to make use of the power of the whole upper body. A good hand cyclist can still achieve a respectable pace in competitions. Handcycles have also been used for touring, though few designers incorporate mudguards or luggage racks. Also, the gear ratios of standard handcycles tend to be less useful for long steep climbs.

==== Hand-and-foot recumbent tricycles ====
Recumbent cycles offer the possibility of combined hand and foot power inputs, and thus the potential for a full-body workout, and the option for persons with a weak or missing leg(s) to power a cycle. In one recumbent tricycle design the user makes the two front wheels change direction by shifting his center of weight, and moves forward by rotating the rear wheel. There are also hybrids between a handcycle, a recumbent bike and a tricycle; these bikes enable cycling by use of legs, despite a spinal cord injury

=== Recumbent quadracycles ===
Recumbent four-wheel cycles have more stability and fewer tracks than tricycles. More wheels introduce more weight and more complexity, namely required wheel suspension on uneven surfaces. The fourth wheel is of most benefit when going off-road. When two and sometimes four riders want to ride together in a sociable configuration the four-wheel recumbent cycle is a viable option.

=== Homebuilts ===
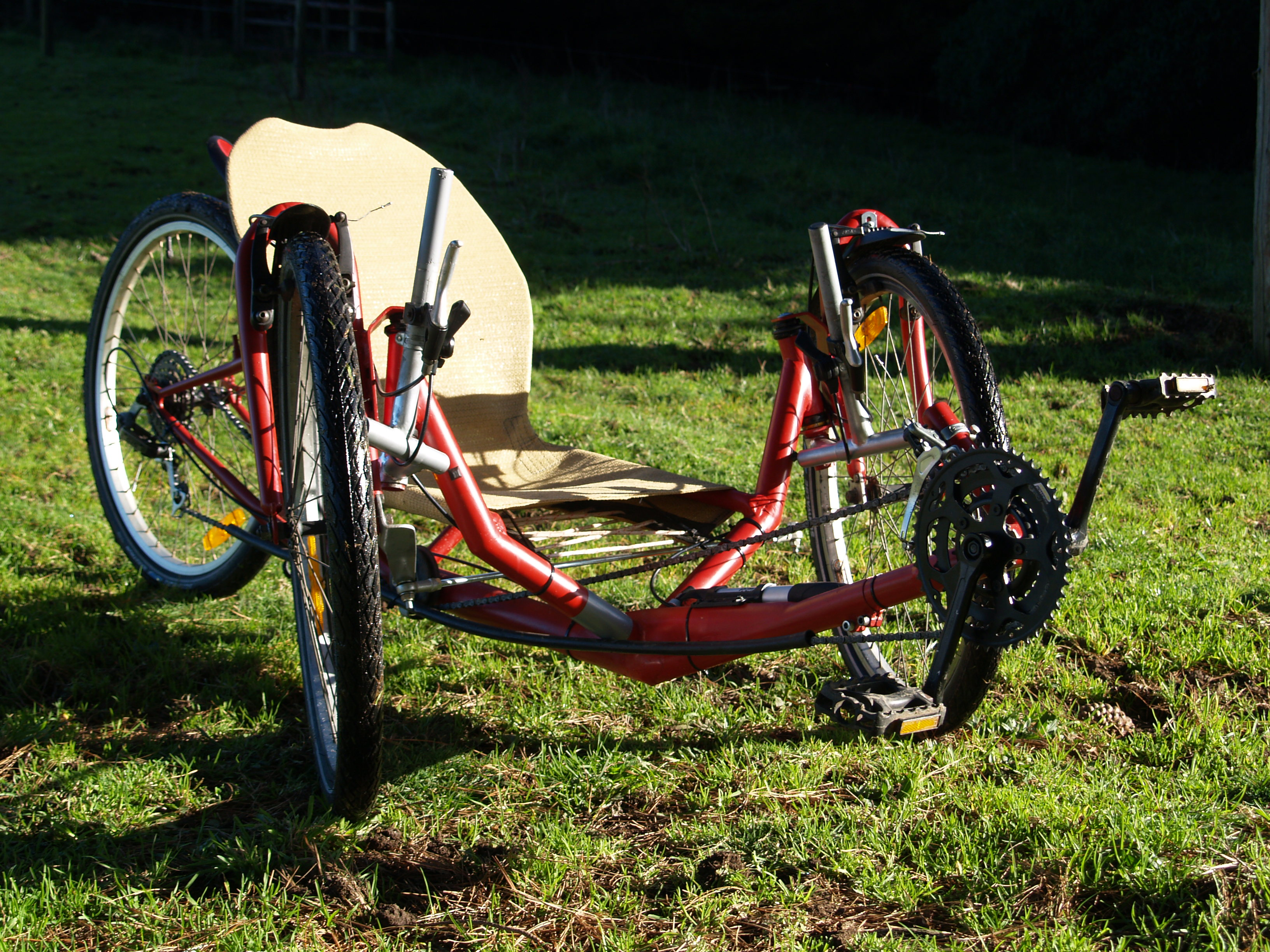
An example of a home built recumbent trike made from two 24″ MTBs

As with upright bikes, there is a subculture of recumbent builders who design and build home-built recumbents. Often these are assembled of parts from other bikes, particularly mountain bikes. The frame designs may be as simple as a long steel tube bent into the appropriate shape, or as elaborate as hand-built carbon fiber frames. For many builders, the engineering and construction of the bikes is as much of a challenge as riding them.

=== Folding ===
Several manufacturers offer folding recumbents to facilitate packing and travelling.

=== Couplers ===
It is possible to add couplers either during manufacturing or as a retrofit so that the frame can be disassembled into smaller pieces to facilitate packing and travel.

=== Stationary recumbents ===
As well as road-going recumbent bicycles with wheels, stationary versions also exist. These are often found in gyms but are also available for home use. Like a regular stationary exercise bike, these stay in one place and the user pedals against some kind of resistance mechanism such as a fan or alternator but in a recumbent position. These have the same comfort advantages as road-going recumbents. Stationary recumbents almost always have a fairly upright seat and the pedal crank is lower than the level of the seat. The seat is normally adjustable and is adjusted by sliding it along a rail.

== History ==
Recumbent bicycle designs date back to the middle of the 19th century. Several designs were patented around 1900, but these early designs were unsuccessful.

=== Early recumbents ===
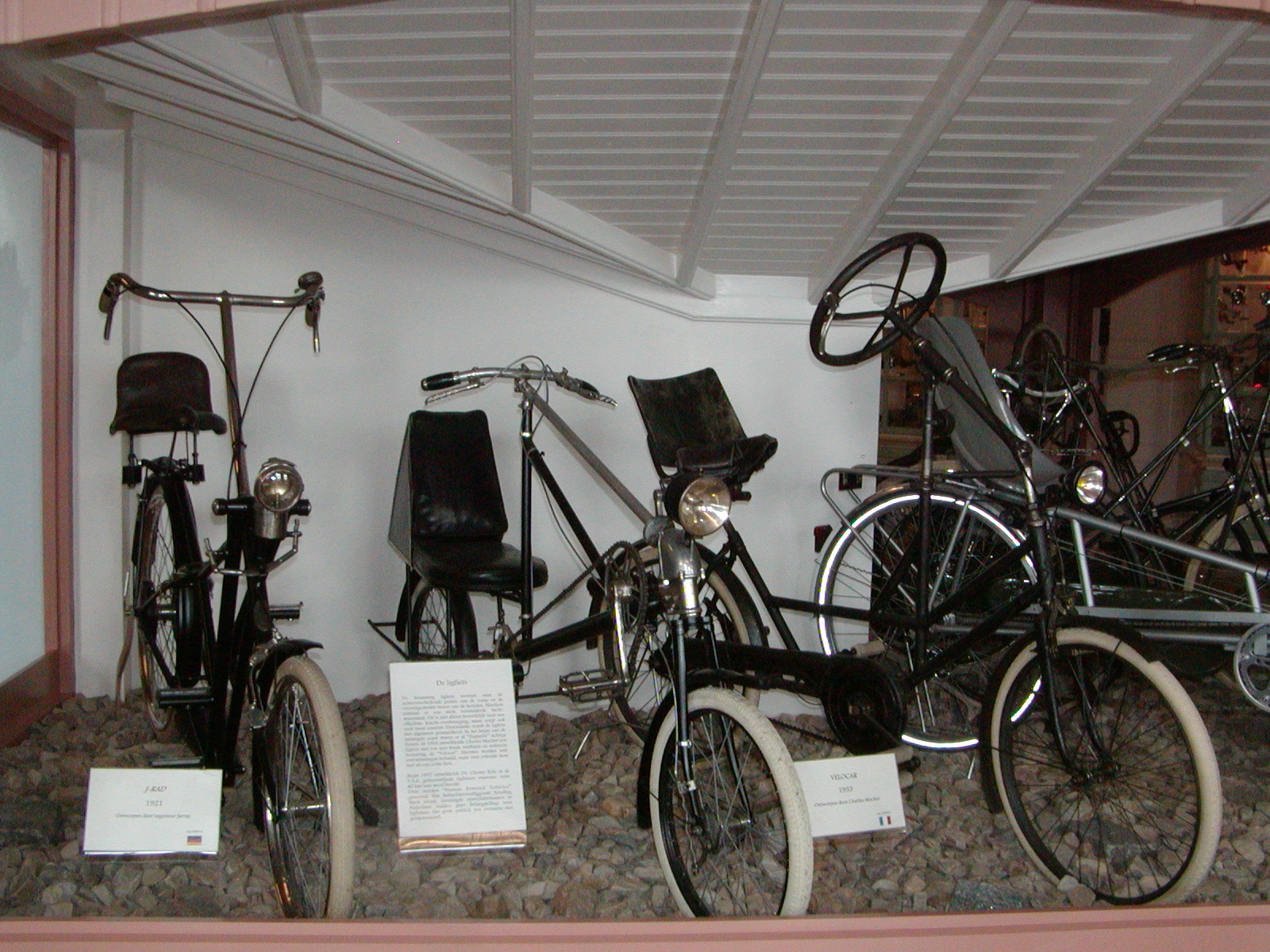
Recumbents from the 1920s in the Velorama

Recumbent designs of both prone and supine varieties can be traced back to the earliest days of the bicycle. Before the shape of the bicycle settled down following Starley's safety bicycle, there was a good deal of experimentation with various arrangements, and this included designs which might be considered recumbent. Although these dated back to the 1860s the first recorded illustration of a recumbent considered as a separate class of bicycle is considered to be in the magazine Fliegende Blätter of 10 September 1893. This year also saw what is considered the first genuine recumbent, the Fautenil Vélociped. Patent applications for a number of recumbent designs exist in the late years of the 19th century, and there were discussions in the cycling press of the relative merits of different layouts. The Challand designs of 1897 and the American Brown of 1901 are both recognisable as forerunners of today's recumbents.

=== The Mochet 'Vélo-Velocar' and 'Vélorizontal' ===
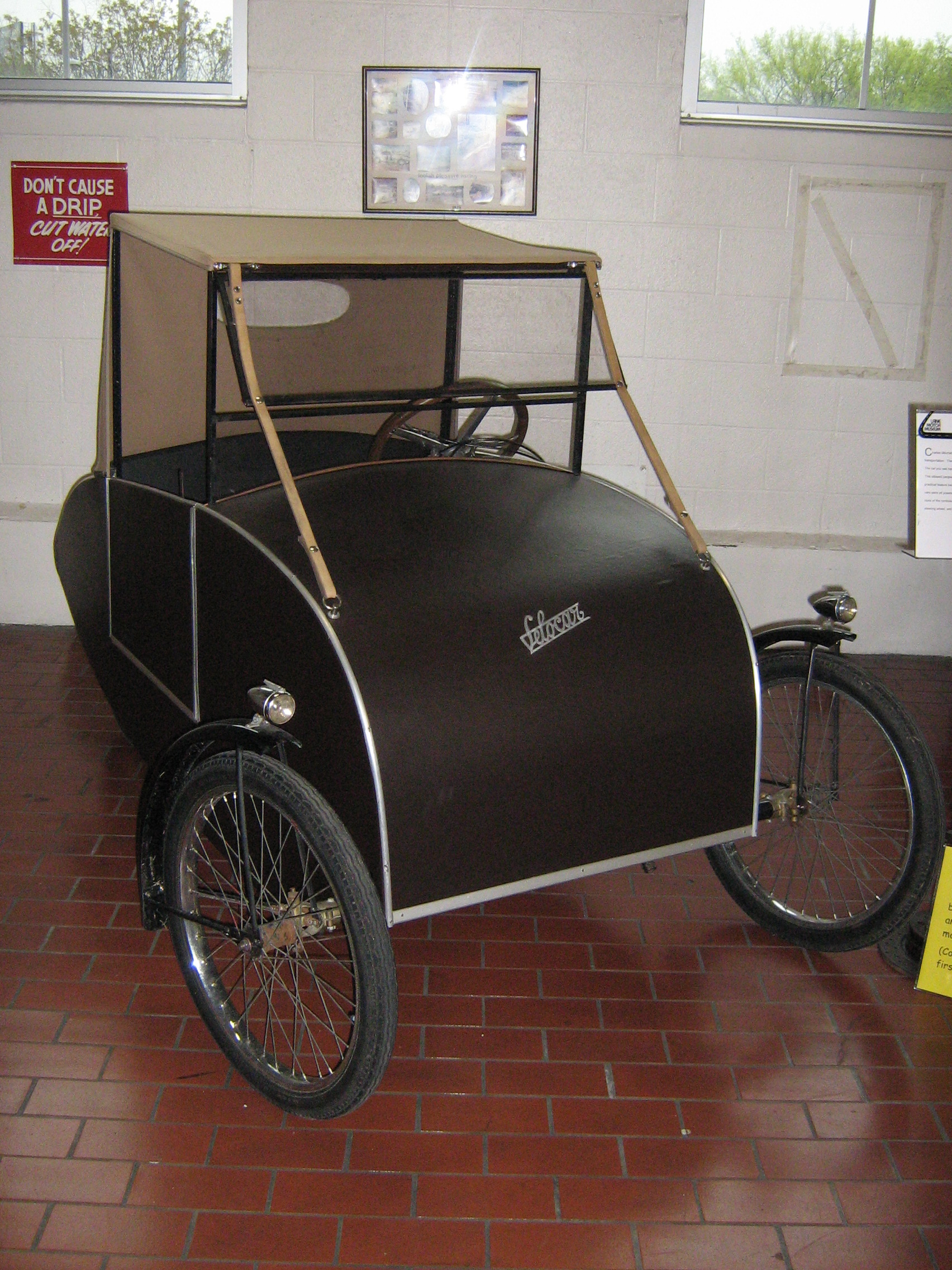
1945 Mochet Velocar

A four-wheeled, two-seater, pedal-propelled car called the 'Velocar' was built in the 1930s by French inventor and light car builder Charles Mochet. Velocars sold well to French buyers who could not afford a motor car, possibly because of a poor economy during the Great Depression. The four-wheeled Velocars were fast but didn't corner well at high speed. Mochet then experimented with a three-wheel design and finally a mould-breaking two-wheel design based on the Vélocar technology.

The early models of Mochet's 'La bicyclette de l'Avenir' (The bicycle of the Future), the 'Vélo-Vélocar', or 'V-V' as the factory referred to them, used a 40 mm (1.6 in) steel-tube, single-beam frame and 450 x 55 wheels with handlebars over the rider and steering torque transmitted by bevel gears. Various types of Mochet-designed derailleur gears were fitted, with a single gear for the track models. Gears were mid-mounted using primary and secondary chains. The back-rest was adjustable on more sporting models.

To demonstrate the speed of his recumbent bicycle, Mochet had the design ratified by the UCI and UVF and enlisted cyclist Francis Faure, a Category 2 racer, to ride it in races. Faure was highly successful, defeating many of Europe's top cyclists both on the track and in road races, and setting new world records at short distances. Another cyclist, Paul Morand, won the Paris-Limoges race in 1933 on one of Mochet's recumbents.

On 7 July 1933, at a Paris velodrome, Faure rode a modified Vélo-Velocar 45.055 km (27.996 mi) in one hour, beating an almost 20-year-old hour record held by Oscar Egg, and attracting a great deal of attention.

When the Union Cycliste Internationale (UCI) met in February 1934, manufacturers of 'upright' bicycles lobbied to have Faure's one-hour record declared invalid. On 1 April 1934, the UCI published a new definition of a racing bicycle that specified how high the bottom bracket could be above the ground, how far it could be in front of the seat and how close it could be to the front wheel. The new definition effectively banned recumbents from UCI events for a combination of tradition, safety, and economic reasons.

Charles Mochet died a short time after the ban was enacted, still protesting against the UCI decision, and the firm continued to make recumbents under his widow and, later, Georges Mochet until at least 1941 for a limited number of customers. Their final versions were a single-chain design named the 'Vélorizontal', the final model using a 'Cyclo' four-speed gear.

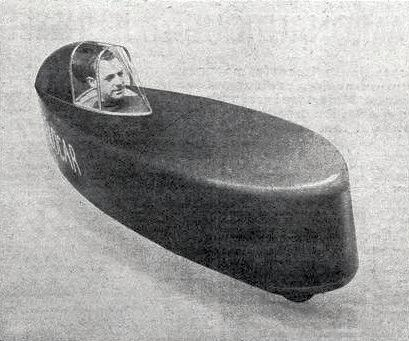
Francis Faure in his record-setting Velocar in 1938

After the UCI decision, Faure continued to race, and consistently beat upright bicycles with the Velocar. In 1938, Faure and Mochet's son, Georges, began adding fairings to the Velocar in hopes of bettering the world record of one hour for a bicycle with aerodynamic components. On 5 March 1938, Faure rode a faired Velocar 50.537 kilometers in an hour and became the first cyclist to travel more than 50 kilometers in an hour without the aid of a pace vehicle.

The UCI ban on recumbent bicycles and other aerodynamic improvements virtually stopped development of recumbents for four decades and remains in force. Although recumbent designs continued to crop up over the years they were mainly the work of lone enthusiasts and numbers remained insignificant until the 1970s. Georges Mochet died in 2008.

=== 1970s resurgence and the IHPVA ===
While developments had been made in this fallow period by Paul Rinkowski and others, the modern recumbent movement was given a boost in 1969 when the Ground Hugger by Robert Riley was featured in Popular Mechanics. There was also the work of Chester Kyle and particularly David Gordon Wilson of MIT, two Americans who opposed the UCI restrictions and continued to work on fairings and recumbents. In 1974, they also nucleated the International Human Power speed Championship in Long Beach, California, from which the IHPVA grew. Kyle and his students had been experimenting with fairings for upright bicycles, also banned by the UCI. In 1975 the brothers John and Randy Schlitter started producing recumbents at their company, Rans, and became the first U.S. company to do so.

In 1978, the "Vélérique" is the very first commercialized recumbent bicycle (fully faired), by the Belgian Erik Abergen.

In 1979, the HPV "White Lightning" broke the US 55 mph national speed limit, winning the Abbot Prize. Eventual top speed of White Lightning was 62 mph.

The Avatar 2000, a LWB bike very much like the current Easy Racers products, arrived in 1979. It was featured in the 1983 film Brainstorm, ridden by Christopher Walken, and in the popular cycling reference Richard's Bicycle Book by Richard Ballantine. From 1983 to 1991 Steven Roberts toured the U.S. in a modified Avatar, pulling a trailer with solar panels and a laptop, gaining press coverage and writing the book Computing Across America. A faired Avatar 2000 was the first two-wheeler to beat the European Vector three-wheeler in the streamliner races. For about ten years afterward, speed records were exchanged between Easy Racers with Freddy Markham in the cockpit and the Lightning Team. So America's strength became the flying 200 meter sprint in the streamliner division. The oil crises of the 1970s sparked a resurgence in cycling coincident with the arrival of these "new" designs.

A parallel but somewhat separate scene grew up in Europe, with the first European human power championships being held in 1983. The European scene was more dominated by competition than was the US, with the result that European bikes are more likely to be low SWB machines, while LWB are much more popular in the US (although there have been some notable European LWB bikes, such as the Peer Gynt).

=== In the 1980s ===
In 1984, Linear Recumbents of Iowa began producing bicycles. In 2002, Linear Manufacturing's assets were bought by Bicycle Man LLC and moved to New York. Since then owner Peter Stull has been working with senior engineering students at Alfred University, local engineers and machinists using available technology including computer FEA testing to improve their recumbent bikes.

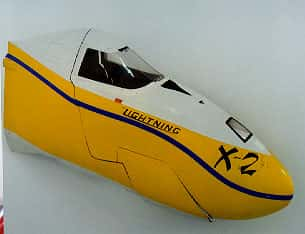
Lightning X-2 record setting HPV

Also in 1984, Lightning X-2 became the first 2-wheel recumbent to pass 55 mph. All previous records had been set by three wheel faired recumbents. Since 1986 the absolute HPV top speed records have been set by two wheel recumbents.

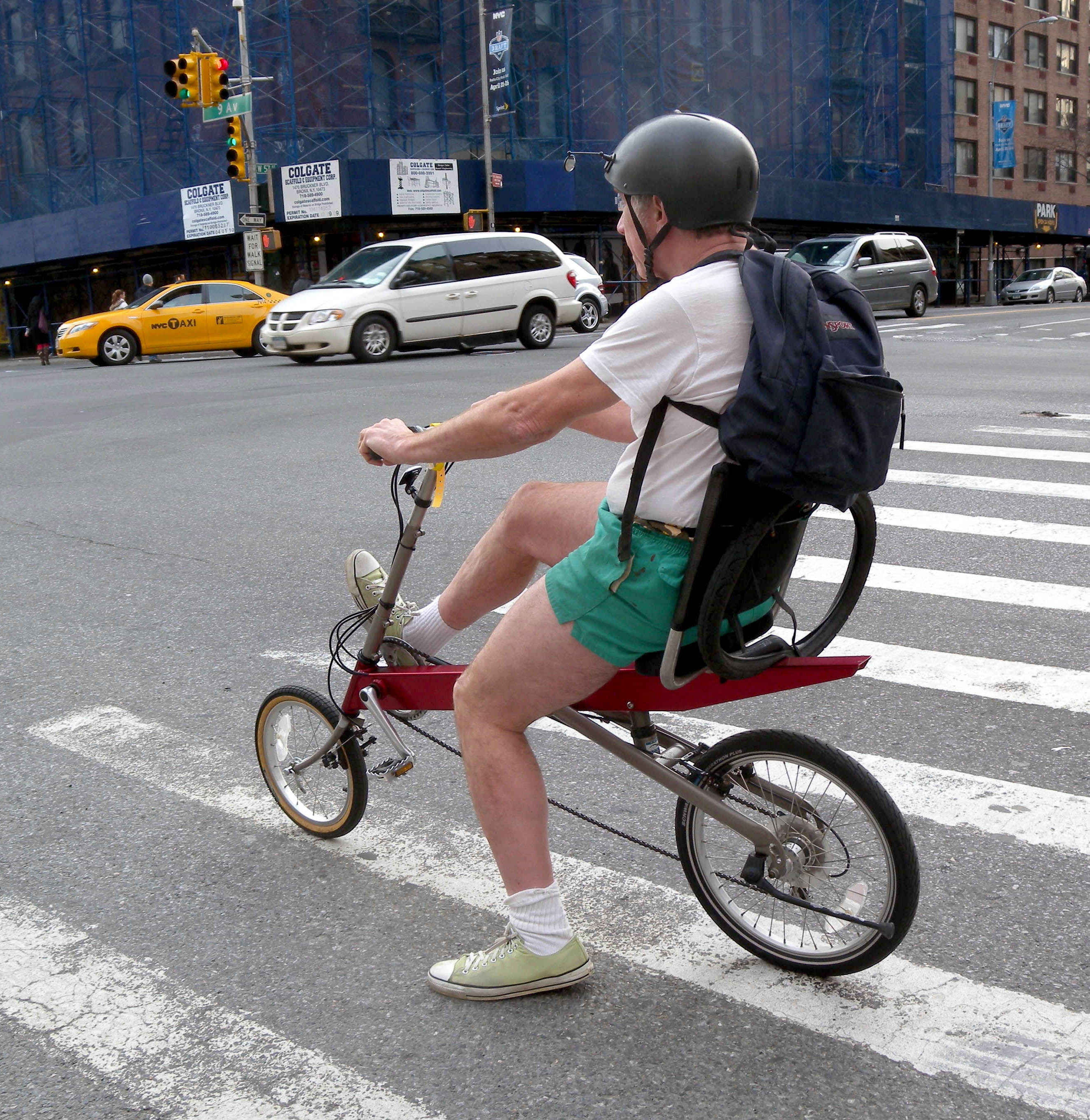
Bike-E

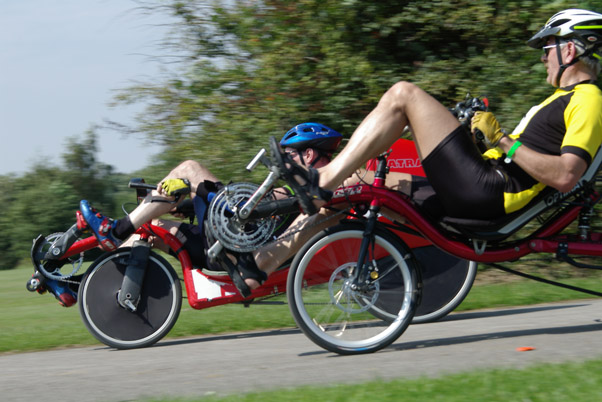
Two medium-wheelbase recumbents in an amateur HPV race

In the UK in the 1980s, the most publicised recumbent cycle in the UK was the delta configuration, sometime electrically powered Sinclair C5. Although sold as an "electric car", the C5 could be characterised as a recumbent tricycle with electrical assistance.

A study by Bussolari and Nadel (1989) led them to pick a recumbent riding position for the Daedalus flight even though the English Channel crossing was accomplished in the Gossamer Albatross with an upright position. Drela in 1998 confirmed "that there was no significant difference in power output between recumbent and conventional bicycling."

Next in 1989, the partly faired Lightning F-40 recumbent bike set the four man Race Across America (RAAM) record, travelling 3000 miles from Los Angeles to New York in 5 days, 1 hour.

=== In the 2000s ===
Three of the largest recumbent manufacturers in the US went out of business after the 1990s, including BikeE (August 2002), ATP-Vision (early 2004) and Burley Design Cooperative (September 2006).

== Performance ==
Over distances recumbent bicycles outperform upright bicycles as evidenced by their dominance in ultra-distance events like 24 hours at Sebring. Official speed records for recumbents are governed by the rules of the International Human Powered Vehicle Association. A number of records are recognised, the fastest of which is the "flying 200 m", a distance of 200 m on level ground from a flying start with a maximum allowable tailwind of 1.66 m/s. The current record is 144.17 km/h (89.58 mph), set by Todd Reichert of Canada in a fully faired front-wheel-drive recumbent lowracer bicycle. The official record for an upright bicycle under IHPVA-legal conditions (but at sea level, not high altitude) is 82.53 km/h (51.28 mph) set by Jim Glover in 1986 with an English-made Moulton bicycle with a USA-made hardshell fairing around him and the bike.

The IHPVA hour record is 90.60 km (56.30 mi), set by Sam Whittingham on 19 July 2009. The latest known hour record is 92.432 km kilometers (57.434 miles), set by Francesco Russo of Switzerland, using Metastretto on the DEKRA Test Oval track in Klettwitz, Germany, 26.06.2016

The equivalent record for an upright bicycle is 55.089 km (34.231 mi), set by Victor Campenaerts in 2019. The UCI no longer considers the bike Chris Boardman rode for his 1996 record to be in compliance with its definition of an upright bicycle. Boardman's Monocoque bike was designed by Mike Burrows, whose Windcheetah recumbent trike (see above) also holds the record from Land's End to John o' Groats, 861 miles (1,386 km) in 41 h 4 min 22 s with Andy Wilkinson riding.

In 2003, Rob English took on and beat the UK 4-man pursuit champions VC St Raphael in a 4000 m challenge race at Reading, beating them by a margin of 4 min 55.5 s to 5 min 6.87 s – and dropping one of the St Raphael riders along the way.

Faired Lightning recumbents ridden by Pete Penseyres.

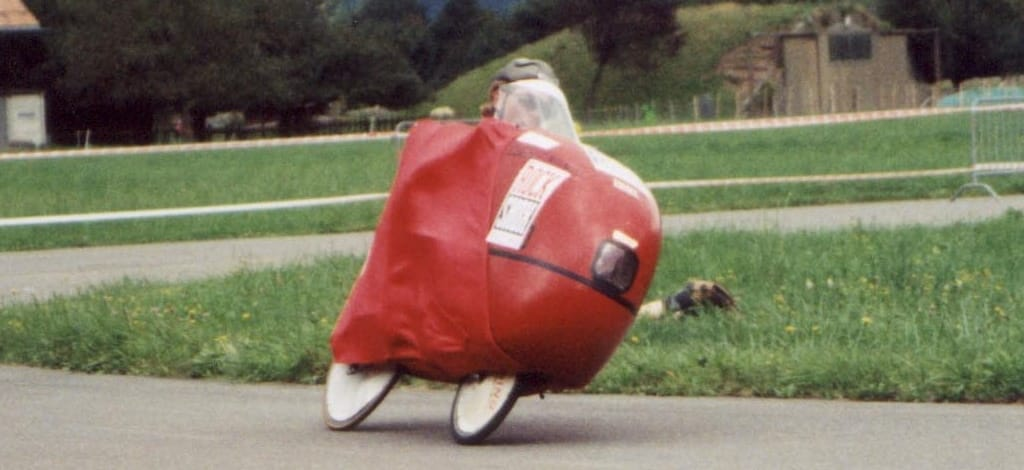
Lightning F-40 cross US record holder

set the Los Angeles to New York (5 days, 1 hour), San Francisco to Los Angeles (18 hours), and Seattle to Portland (7 hours, 31 minutes) records.

In 2009 Team RANS won the Race Across America (RAAM) four person division on unfaired recumbents in 6 days, 3 hours.

== See also ==
- Bicycle and motorcycle dynamics
- Bicycle and motorcycle geometry
- Bicycle performance
- Bicycle seat
- Bicycle suspension
- Feet forwards motorcycle recumbent motorbike equivalent.
- Fastest speed on a bicycle
- Handcycles
- International Human Powered Vehicle Association
- Prone bicycle
- Quadracycle (human-powered vehicle)
- Tricycle
- Unicycle
- Velomobile
- X-seam
- World Human Powered Vehicle Association
- Whike, a recumbent bicycle with a sail
