= International Human Powered Vehicle Association =

The International Human Powered Vehicle Association (IHPVA) is a US-based organization dedicated to promoting the design and development of human powered vehicles (HPVs) and the keeping of speed and distance records for these vehicles and bikes.

== History ==
The IHPVA was founded in 1976 in the USA and was for many years an association of individual members with the publications Human Power and HPV News. In 1997, the IHPVA was reorganised into an international association with national organisations as members and an American association which adopted the name Human Powered Vehicle Association HPVA.

Due to conflicts regarding record keeping and copyrights, the HPVA left the IHPVA in 2004. In 2008, the HPVA renamed itself to IHPVA while the IHPVA of this time decided to keep its name, resulting in a brief period with two organisations of the same name.

In a hostile takeover, the American IHPVA also seized control of the domain name ihpva.org away from the international IHPVA. This tried to regain its domain by appealing to the ICANN's ombudsman but was unsuccessful and in 2009 renamed itself to World Human Powered Vehicle Association (WHPVA).

== Members ==
Today's IHPVA is an association of individuals from all over the world and has affiliate associations in North America. The affiliates are:

- Association des Véhicules à Propulsion Humaine du Québec (aVPHq)
- BRAG - Bent Riders of Arizona Group
- Chicagoland Recumbent Riders
- Easy Riders Recumbent Club (ERRC) - Oregon
- Florida, Georgia, and Alabama- Loose Assemblage of SouthEast Recumbent Riders (LASERR)
- HPVs of Southern Ontario
- Human Powered Vehicle Operators of Ottawa (HPVOoO)
- Los Angeles/Orange County Recumbent Riders
- Los Angeles Recumbent Riders (LARRs)
- Louisville's Relaxed Recumbent Riders' Group
- Mars- (Metro Area Recumbent Society) - New Jersey
- Michigan HPVA
- Minnesota HPVA (MnHPVA)
- Bent Trail Riders (BTR) of OHIO
- Omaha-Nebraska Country Cruisers
- Oregon Human Power Vehicles (OHPV)
- Recumbenteers of Western New York
- Recumbent Cycling Ontario formally HPVSO
- R-BENT, Recumbent-Bike Enthusiasts of North Texas
- R-Best (Recumbent - Bicycle Enthusiast of South Texas)
- Redwood Empire HPV
- Rochester Area Recumbent Enthusiasts (RARE)
- San Diego Recumbent Riders
- Seattle Area Bike Builders' Group
- Washington's Happily Independent Recumbent Lovers (WHIRL)
- Wisconsin/Illinois HPV riders (WISIL HPVers)
- Wolver-Bents Recumbent Cyclist
- League of Michigan Bicyclist Spin-off

== IHPVA records ==
The IHPVA maintains speed and distance records for various times and distances for land, water and air vehicles. The current hour record was achieved by Sam Wittingham with a total Distance of 90.60 km (56.29 mi) in 2009. Its recordbase has forked from the WHPVA in 2009, who currently recognizes Francesco Russo's 2016 claim of 92.43 km (57.43 mi) as the hour record.
