= Coyote (disambiguation) =

The coyote is a species of canine found throughout North and Central America.

Coyote or El Coyote may also refer to:

== Mythology ==
- Coyote (mythology), trickster spirit of many indigenous cultures of North America
- Coyote (Navajo mythology)

== Places ==
- Coyote, California, an unincorporated community
- Coyote, Lincoln County, New Mexico, an unincorporated community
- Coyote, Rio Arriba County, New Mexico, a census-designated place
- Coyote Buttes, Utah and Arizona
- Coyote Creek (disambiguation)
- Coyote Dam (Santa Clara County, California)
- Coyote Gold Mine, in the remote Tanami Desert of Australia
- Coyote Hills (disambiguation)
- Coyote Lake (disambiguation)
- Coyote Mountain (disambiguation)
- Coyote Mountains (Arizona)
- Coyote Mountains, California
- Coyote Valley, California
- Coyote Valley, Colorado (Kawuneeche Valley)
- Rancho Los Coyotes, an 1834 Mexican land grant

== People ==
=== Types of people ===
- Coyote (person), who smuggles people illegally into the US from Mexico
- Coyote (racial category), in colonial Mexico, a person with Amerindian and Spanish ancestry

=== People with the given name Coyote ===
- Coyote Park (born 1999), Spanish-born American visual artist, of mixed heritage
- Coyote Peterson (born 1981), American YouTuber and wildlife educator
- Coyote Shivers (born 1965), Canadian musician and actor
- El Coyote (singer), Mexican singer José Angel Ledezma Quintero (born 1970)

=== People with the surname Coyote ===
- Alberto Coyote (born 1967), Mexican football player
- Ivan Coyote (born 1969), Canadian spoken word performer and writer
- Peter Coyote (born 1941), American actor

== Arts and entertainment ==
=== Fictional characters ===
- Coyote, a character in the TV series Gargoyles
- Coyote, a character in the webcomic Gunnerkrigg Court
- Calamity Coyote, a cartoon character in the TV series Tiny Toon Adventures
- Coyote Bergstein, a character in the TV series Grace and Frankie
- El Coyote (character), a Zorro-like character created by José Mallorquí
- Tech E. Coyote, a cartoon character
- Wile E. Coyote, a cartoon character
- Coyote Stark, a character in the anime and manga Bleach

=== Films ===
- The Coyote (film), a 1955 Mexican-Spanish western
- Coyote (1992 film), a Canadian-French film
- Coyote (2007 film), an independent film
- Coyote (2017 film), a biography of the sailor Mike Plant
- Coyote (2022 film), a Canadian drama directed by Katherine Jerkovic
- Coyotes (film), a 2025 American horror comedy directed by Colin Minihan

=== Literature ===
- Coyotes (book), a 1987 nonfiction book on Mexican migrant workers
- Coyote (comics), a comic book series by Steve Englehart
- Coyote (novel), a 2002 science fiction novel by Allen Steele
- Coyote, a manga by Kouta Hirano
- Coyote, a 1990 mystery novel by Linda Barnes

=== Other arts and entertainment ===
- Coyote (TV series), an American drama TV series
- Coyote: I Like America and America Likes Me, 1974 performance by Joseph Beuys

=== Music ===
==== Albums ====
- Coyote (Tommy Richman album) (2024)
- Coyote (Dylan LeBlanc album) (2023)
- Coyote (Kayo Dot album) (2010)
- Coyote (Matt Mays album) (2012)

==== Songs ====
- "Coyote" (song), from the 1976 Joni Mitchell album Hejira
- "Coyote", a song from the 1989 album Water in Time and Space by Susumu Hirasawa
- "Coyote", a song from the 1993 album Deluxe (Better Than Ezra album) by Better Than Ezra
- "Coyote", a song from the 2002 album The Ragpicker's Dream by Mark Knopfler
- "Coyote", a song from the 2026 album Middle of Nowhere by Kacey Musgraves
- "Coyote", a song by Country Joe McDonald
- "Coyotes" (song), an American Western song by Bob McDill
- "Coyotes", a song from We Sing, We Dance, We Steal Things by Jason Mraz
- "El Coyote", a song from My Favorite Picture of You by Guy Clark

== Radio stations ==
- KCLQ, licensed to Lebanon, Missouri, branded as 107.9 FM The Coyote
- KCYE, licensed to serve Meadview, Arizona, branded as 107.9 Coyote Country
- KIOT, licensed to Los Lunas, New Mexico, branded as Coyote 102.5 FM
- KLQB, licensed to Austin, Texas, at one time branded as KOYT 104.3 FM The Coyote
- KVGS, in Boulder City, Nevada, formerly branded as 102.7 FM The Coyote
- WCYO, licensed to Irvine, Kentucky, branded as 100.7 FM The Coyote
- WYOT, licensed to Rochelle, Illinois, branded as 102.3 FM The Coyote

== Military ==
- Coyote Reconnaissance Vehicle, used by the Canadian Armed Forces
- Coyote Tactical Support Vehicle, used by the UK Armed Forces
- GQM-163 Coyote, a US Navy target drone
- HMLA-775, a US Marine Corps helicopter squadron known as the Coyotes
- Raytheon Coyote, a small, expendable, unmanned aircraft system
- USS Coyote (SP-84), US Navy patrol craft, training vessel, and supply boat
- Coyote brown, a color, often used in military camouflage

== Sports ==
=== Teams ===
- Alliston Coyotes, a Canadian Junior A ice hockey team in Ontario
- Arizona Coyotes, a National Hockey League team
- Cal State San Bernardino Coyotes, the athletics teams of Cal State University, San Bernardino
- Canton Coyotes, a former minor league baseball team from Ohio
- Central Valley Coyotes, a defunct arena football team from California
- Connecticut Coyotes, a former arena football team from Connecticut
- Edinburg Roadrunners, a defunct independent baseball team from Texas, known as the Edinburg Coyotes from 2006 to 2008
- Kansas Wesleyan Coyotes, the athletics teams of Kansas Wesleyan University
- Las Vegas Coyotes, a former inline hockey team
- Osoyoos Coyotes, a Canadian Junior B ice hockey team in British Columbia
- Palm Desert Coyotes, a possibly defunct independent baseball team from Palm Springs, California
- South Dakota Coyotes, the University of South Dakota athletics teams
- Thetford Mines Coyotes, former name of the Thetford Mines Isothermic, a Canadian ice hockey team in Quebec

=== Other sports uses ===
- Los Coyotes LPGA Classic, an LPGA golf tournament from 1989 to 1992
- The Coyote (mascot), mascot of the National Basketball Association team San Antonio Spurs

== Transportation ==
=== Air ===
- Advanced Aviation Coyote
- Rans S-4 Coyote
- Rans S-5 Coyote
- Rans S-6 Coyote II

=== Land ===
- Coyote (automobile), American automobile built from 1909 to 1910
- Coyote (chassis), a brand of car chassis used by A. J. Foyt's race team
- 5.0 L Coyote, a version of the Ford Modular engine

== Other uses ==
- Coyote Building, Chicago
- Coyote (Apache), an HTTP connector built into the Apache Tomcat Web container
- Call Off Your Old Tired Ethics (COYOTE), a sex workers' rights organization

== See also ==
- Coyote Ugly (film) (2000)
- Eugene Little Coyote, president of the Northern Cheyenne Indian Reservation
- Koyote, South Korean pop group
