= Palm Springs Chill =

Minor-league professional baseball team in Palm Springs, California

Logo
Cap insignia

Information
- League: California Winter League
- Location: Palm Springs, California
- Ballpark: Palm Springs Stadium
- Founded: 2008
- League championships: 0
- Division championships: 0
- Former league: Arizona Winter League
- Colors: Black, columbia blue, white
- Ownership: Palm Springs Power
- General manager: Andrew Starke (principal owner)
- Manager: TBA
- Media: The Business Press (newspaper); The Desert Sun (newspaper); KPSI-AM 920 (Radio); KRP Broadcasting (internet)
- Website: CA Winter League: Palm Springs Chill

The Palm Springs Chill are an independent baseball team based in Palm Springs, California. They are co-owned by the Palm Springs Power and play their home games at Palm Springs Stadium. Andrew Starke is the team president and Darrell Evans is the manager.

== Team history ==
=== Arizona Winter League (2008–2009) ===
They were a member of the Arizona Winter League, a short-season instructional winter league affiliated with the Golden Baseball League in 2008 and 2009, making the playoffs and championship game both seasons, before losing to the Blythe Heat and Yuma Scorpions respectively.

=== California Winter League (2010) ===
The Chill ownership created a brand new winter league in 2010, the California Winter League, to offer more opportunities for aspiring players to flourish. They will be joined by the Coachella Valley Snowbirds, the Palm Desert Coyotes and the Canada A's. Former Major Leaguer and former Victoria Seals manager Darrell Evans was named commissioner of this new league.

== Year-by-year records ==
Arizona Winter League:

Season	W	L	Win %	Place	Playoff
2008	15	4	.789	1st	Qualified. Lost to Blythe in the Playoffs.
2009	12	8	.600	2nd, American Division	Qualified. Lost to Yuma in the Playoffs.

California Winter League:

Season	W	L	Win %	Place	Playoff

== Mascot ==
Tundra is the official mascot of the Palm Springs Chill. During the 2012 California Winter League baseball season the Palm Springs Chill started to become very popular in the Palm Springs area. Due to the success of the Palm Springs Power college baseball team in the summer the revenue in the California Winter League was at an all-time high in 2012. The Palm Springs Chill are filled with Independent level players who usually have the same talent level as low minor league players. They have a roster full of signed players such as Jacob Taylor, Jimmy Waters, and Miles Walding who is an Arizona Diamondback minor league signed player, 29-year-old star outfielder Derrick Pyles who played for the New York Federals in 2011 after he finished college at Embry-Riddle University in Florida is also a big reason for the Chill success. The Chill are managed by Ricky Vanasselberg as of 2012. Ricky is also manager of the Grand Prairie Air Hogs who compete in the American Association of Independent Baseball which is Double A level baseball players and ex major league players trying to stay in the game as long as possible. The Chill usually are made up of former college baseball players with talent to sign professional contracts after the season. The team finished 13 and 6 during the 2012 California Winter League season and were California Winter League runner up finishers after losing to the Palm Springs Power 7 to 5 in the Championship game in front of 2,500 fans at Palm Springs Stadium.
