= Palm Desert Coyotes =

American independent basketball team

- Logo

Information
- League: California Winter League
- Location: Palm Springs, California
- Ballpark: Palm Springs Stadium
- Founded: 2009
- League championships: 0
- Division championships: 0
- Colors: Black & Gold
- Ownership: California Winter League
- Media: The Desert Sun (newspaper); KPSI-AM 920 (Radio); KRP Broadcasting (internet)
- Website: www.californiawinterleague.com

The Palm Desert Coyotes are an independent professional baseball team that is based in Palm Springs, California as a part of the California Winter League. They play their games in a short-season schedule from January to February at Palm Springs Stadium and at the nearby Palm Springs High School baseball field, along with the Palm Springs Chill, Canada A's and Coachella Valley Snowbirds and several other teams. The Coyotes didn't play in 2012 due to a team suspension of operations. They were replaced by the winter league version of the Palm Springs Power. The Coyotes returned in 2013.

== Year-by-year records ==
California Winter League:

Season	W	L	Win %	Place	Playoff
2010					
