= Coyote Dam =

Coyote Dam may refer to:

- Coyote Creek Dam (Lake County, California) which impounds Hidden Valley Lake
- Coyote Dam (Santa Clara County, California) which impounds Coyote Lake
- Coyote Dam (Colorado)
- Coyote Flat Dam (Lassen County, California) which impounds Coyote Reservoir
- Coyote Hold Dam (Arizona)
- Coyote Valley Dam (Mendocino County, California) which impounds Lake Mendocino
