= Canada A's =

- Logo

Information
- League: California Winter League
- Location: Palm Springs, California
- Ballpark: Palm Springs Stadium
- Founded: 2009
- League championships: 0
- Division championships: 0
- Former name: Canada A's (2010–present); Team Canada (2009)
- Former league: Arizona Winter League
- Former ballpark: Desert Sun Stadium
- Colors: Crimson & White
- Ownership: California Winter League
- General manager: TBA
- Manager: TBA
- Media: The Desert Sun (newspaper); KPSI-AM 920 (Radio); KRP Broadcasting (internet)
- Website: www.californiawinterleague.com

The Canada A's are an independent professional baseball team representing Canada (and Cathedral City, California) that will be based in Palm Springs, California as a part of the California Winter League. They play their games in a short-season schedule from January to February at Palm Springs Stadium along with the Palm Springs Chill, Coachella Valley Snowbirds and Palm Desert Coyotes.

They started as Team Canada in the rival Arizona Winter League, a short-season instructional winter league affiliated with the Golden Baseball League and played in the International Division. They were reported to have left the AWL and joined the CWL as the "Canada A's".

== Year-By-Year Records ==
Arizona Winter League:

Season	W	L	Win %	Place	Playoff
2009	8	12	.400	3rd, International Division	Did not qualify.

California Winter League:

Season	W	L	Win %	Place	Playoff
2015	11	4	.733	1st, Champion's League	1st place
