= Darrell Evans =

American baseball player (born 1947)

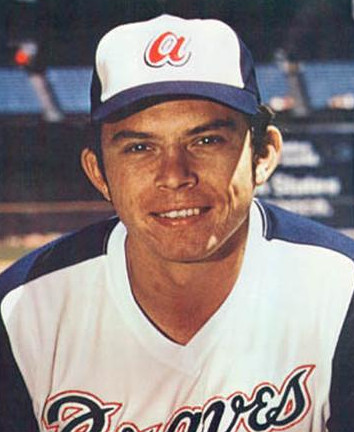
- Evans with the Atlanta Braves in 1974
- Third baseman / First baseman
- Born: May 26, 1947 (age 79); Pasadena, California, U.S.
- Batted: Left Threw: Right

MLB debut
- April 20, 1969, for the Atlanta Braves

Last MLB appearance
- October 1, 1989, for the Atlanta Braves

MLB statistics
- Batting average: .248
- Hits: 2,223
- Home runs: 414
- Runs batted in: 1,354
- Stats at Baseball Reference

Teams
- Atlanta Braves (1969–1976); San Francisco Giants (1976–1983); Detroit Tigers (1984–1988); Atlanta Braves (1989)

Career highlights and awards
- 2× All-Star (1973, 1983); World Series champion (1984); AL home run leader (1985); San Francisco Giants Wall of Fame

Darrell Wayne Evans (born May 26, 1947) is an American former baseball player, coach and manager. He played 21 seasons in Major League Baseball (MLB), beginning his career as a third baseman with the Atlanta Braves (1969–1976, 1989), alternating between first and third base with the San Francisco Giants (1976–1983), and playing much of his later career as a first baseman and sometimes as a designated hitter for the Detroit Tigers (1984–1988). He won a World Series championship with the Tigers in 1984. Evans had most of his success in the early and late stages of his career. He was a two-time All-Star, first with the Braves in 1973 and then with the Giants in 1983. He led MLB in home runs in 1985 with the Tigers, and walks in 1973 and 1974 with the Braves.

Born in Pasadena, California, Evans was the son of a professional fast pitch softball player. He attended Pasadena City College and helped lead the baseball and basketball teams to California junior college championships. In the majors, Evans had a breakout season in 1973, finishing third in MLB with 41 home runs and leading the league in runs created and walks. He was traded to the San Francisco Giants in the middle of his lackluster 1976 season. His best season with the Giants was his 1983 All-Star season when he hit 30 home runs and compiled a .378 on-base percentage in his last year with the team. Evans signed as a free agent with the Detroit Tigers prior to the 1984 season, winning the World Series in his first year with the team. He led MLB in home runs with 40 in 1985 at age 38, becoming the oldest player in history to accomplish the feat. By hitting his home runs in the American League, he also became the first in MLB history to have a 40-homer season in both the American and the National Leagues. Evans concluded his playing career with a return to the Braves in 1989.

Baseball historian Bill James rated Evans as "the most underrated player in baseball history." He was the 22nd player in MLB history to hit 400 home runs and the second to hit at least 100 home runs with three different teams. His 1,605 walks ranked eighth in MLB history at the time of his retirement, and he drew 90 or more walks in eight separate seasons (reaching 100+ walks five times). His skill in drawing walks contributed to a .361 career on-base percentage despite a .248 career batting average. After retiring as a player, Evans served as a manager and coach in Minor League Baseball and independent leagues from 1990 to 2010. His career as a manager included stints with the Wilmington Blue Rocks and the Huntsville Stars in the minors.

== Early years ==
Evans was born in 1947 in Pasadena, California, to Eleanor (née Salazar, 1923–2013) and Richard Evans, both of whom came from baseball families. His mother and her sister Margaret played professional fast pitch softball together for a national championship team in Southern California, and his aunt in particular was selected as an All-American outfielder. Evans attended his mother's softball games as an infant and later served as the team's bat boy. His father was a sheet metal mechanic who had played college baseball. Both of Evans' parents had relatives in professional baseball. His maternal grandfather Dave Salazar was a pitcher in the Chicago White Sox organization and played for the San Francisco Seals in the Pacific Coast League. His uncle Bob Evans had also played minor league ball in the St. Louis Cardinals' organization. Evans attended John Muir High School in Pasadena. He played baseball at Muir as a right-handed throwing pitcher and third baseman who batted left handed. In March 1965, he threw a no-hitter for Muir.

In the fall of 1965, Evans enrolled at Pasadena City College (PCC). As a freshman during the 1965–66 academic year, he was the leading scorer for PCC's basketball team and led the baseball team with a .423 batting average. In December 1965, he scored 12 points in a losing effort against a UCLA team featuring Lew Alcindor. During the 1966–67 academic year, he hit .451 for the PCC baseball team and led both the baseball and basketball teams to California junior college championships. His basketball coach during the 1966–67 season was Jerry Tarkanian. Evans received the school's athlete of the year award in 1967, and he was later inducted into the PCC Hall of Fame as "the ultimate in Pasadena City College legends."

== Professional baseball player ==
=== Minor leagues ===
Evans was drafted by the Chicago Cubs in 1965, the New York Yankees and Detroit Tigers in 1966, and the Philadelphia Phillies and Kansas City Athletics in 1967. He originally didn't sign with the Cubs out of high school because he was planning to play baseball on full scholarship at the University of Southern California, but that did not materialize. In June 1967, he finally signed a pro contract with the Athletics, receiving a $15,000 signing bonus.

Evans played for three different minor league clubs during the 1967 season: Leesburg in the Florida State League, Peninsula in the Carolina League, and Bradenton of the Gulf Coast League. He compiled a .326 batting average with a .402 on-base percentage in 61 minor league games during the 1967 season. In his time at Bradenton, he hit .489. He was named 1967 player of the year in the Gulf Coast League.

He spent the 1968 season with Birmingham in the Southern League. Evans's playing time was limited in 1967 and 1968 by his service in the United States Marine Corps. Evans later recalled that his arm "always one of my strong points, was sore and gone" after his discharge from the Marines, resulting in a poor performance in 1968. However, Evans credited the strength he gained in the Marines with helping him become a pull hitter. Evans compiled a .248 batting average and .299 on-base percentage in 56 games for Birmingham. Alf Van Hoose, sports editor of The Birmingham News recalled Evans as "a terrible infielder" with a "smooth swing."

=== Atlanta Braves ===
==== 1969 to 1972 seasons ====
In December 1968, after the A's chose not to include Evans on their list of protected minor league players, Evans was selected by the Atlanta Braves in the Rule 5 draft for $25,000. Evans began the 1969 season with the Braves but was limited to pinch-hitting. In late April 1969, he was sent down to the Shreveport Braves in Double-A ball. He was then promoted to the Richmond Braves of the Triple-A International League where he hit .360 with a .433 on-base percentage in 59 games. He was recalled to Atlanta in late August 1969, but hit only .231 in 26 at bats.

Evans spent most of the 1970 season at Richmond where he hit .300 with 47 extra base hits and 83 RBIs in 120 games. He hit .318 in 44 at bats for Atlanta in 1970, but Atlanta manager Lum Harris continued to relegate Evans to the minors due to his "mediocre fielding". Evans received the nickname "Clank" due to his fielding difficulties. He also acquired the nickname "Howdy Doody" due to his resemblance to the popular television puppet of the same name.

Evans began the 1971 season with Richmond where he was moved to the outfield and batted .307 with a .437 on-base percentage. In late May, Evans received an opportunity to become the Braves' starting third baseman when the team released Clete Boyer following Boyer's open criticism of the team's general manager. Evans appeared in 72 games at the third base for the 1971 Braves; he hit .242 in 260 at bats in his rookie season. Atlanta hitting coach (and later manager) Eddie Mathews worked with Evans on his fielding. Evans later recalled: "Eddie was not only my manager, he was my friend. He used to talk to me, pump into me that I had to do it."

In 1972, Evans was the Braves' regular third baseman, appearing in 125 games. He demonstrated his control of the strike zone, drawing 90 walks (fifth in the National League) and compiling a .384 on-base percentage (seventh in the league). Although his 25 errors ranked second among National League third basemen, he improved defensively, leading the league's third basemen with a range factor of 3.24 per game and ranking high among the league's third basemen with 126 putouts (second), 273 assists (fourth), and 20 double plays (fourth).

==== 1973 breakout season ====
Evans had a breakout season in 1973. He was selected as the reserve third baseman (behind starter Ron Santo) on the 1973 National League All-Star team, ultimately finishing the year with 41 home runs (third in MLB behind Willie Stargell and teammate Davey Johnson) and an on-base plus slugging percentage (OPS) of .959 (third in MLB behind teammate Hank Aaron and Stargell). Evans also led the major leagues in walks with 125 and runs created with 143. With his high walk rate, he reached base 294 times, second only to Pete Rose, and had a .403 on-base percentage. Additionally, he was third in extra-base hits with 74, and also finished fourth in runs scored with 114 and fifth in RBIs with 105. This was the only season of Evans's career where he had over 100 runs or 100 RBIs. He also ranked among the best defensive third basemen in the National League with a 3.08 range factor per game (first in NL), 124 putouts (second in NL), and 325 assists (second in NL). Evans told reporters in July 1973 that his defensive improvement "has meant more to me than the home runs."

Evans' 1973 accomplishments were overshadowed by teammate Hank Aaron's pursuit of Babe Ruth's career home run record. Evans responded to the lack of attention to his accomplishments, telling reporters in August 1973: "I can't say it bothers me. Hell, I enjoy reading about Hank, just like everyone else." Evans hit before Aaron in the Braves' batting order, and in April the following season, he was on first base when Aaron hit his historic 715th home run. The 1973 Braves were the first team in major league history to have three players – Evans, Aaron, and Davey Johnson – hit at least 40 home runs. Despite the surge in power, the 1973 Braves finished fifth in the National League West with a 76–85 record due to a pitching staff that allowed the most runs in the National League.

==== 1974 to 1976 seasons ====
Prior to the 1974 season, Evans pursued salary arbitration, where he was awarded a $52,500 salary. Evans appeared in 160 games at third base for the Braves. For the second consecutive year, he led the majors in walks, tallying a career-high 126 bases on balls. In a remarkable turn-around, the player formerly known as "Clank" had a 3.45 range factor and led the National League with a 2.7 Defensive Wins Above Replacement rating. He also ranked among the National League's leaders with 269 times on base (fourth), 25 home runs (tied for sixth), 99 runs scored (seventh), and a 7.2 overall Wins Above Replacement rating (seventh). His 1974 performance was nevertheless considered disappointing in light of a 41-point drop in his batting average and expectations created by his 1973 season. Evans attributed his less impressive performance in part to "personal problems, some private things that were bothering me."

The 1975 season was Evans' final full season with the Braves. Following the trade of Hank Aaron, Evans took over Aaron's third spot in the batting over. After a strong start in April, Evans' output slowed. He ended up batting .243 in 156 games. His power output also declined, as he totaled just 22 home runs and 73 RBIs to go along with a .406 slugging percentage. Evans' output declined further at the start of the 1976 season. With Jerry Royster taking over at third base, Evans was moved to first base. After 44 games, Evans' batting average stood at .173 with only one home run. He sought to remedy the slump by switching from contact lenses to glasses. Evans later recalled: "It was the one time in my career when I really doubted myself. I couldn't seem to do anything right. I couldn't see the ball very well and I wasn't being patient at the plate. Then I'd take a pitch and it would be right down the middle."

=== San Francisco Giants ===
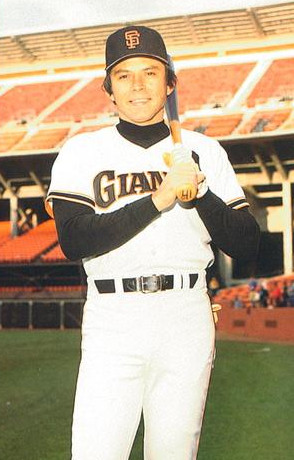
Evans with the Giants in 1983

On June 13, 1976, the Braves traded Evans with Marty Perez to the San Francisco Giants in exchange for Willie Montañez, Craig Robinson, and two other players. He promptly became the Giants' starting first baseman. In his first season in San Francisco, Evans compiled a .222 batting average with 10 home runs in 92 games. In his early years with the Giants, Evans shifted between left field, third base, and first base. In 1978, he settled in at third base, starting 612 games at that position from 1978 to 1982.

In 1983, Evans shifted back to first base and had his best season in San Francisco. He was named to the National League All-Star team as a reserve first baseman, hit 30 home runs and compiled a .378 on-base percentage and .516 slugging percentage. He won the Giants’ 1983 Willie Mac Award for his spirit and leadership. Evans spent eight seasons with the Giants, appearing in 1,094 games, compiling a .255 batting average, .358 on-base percentage, and .422 slugging percentage with 142 home runs, 525 RBIs and 605 walks.

=== Detroit Tigers ===
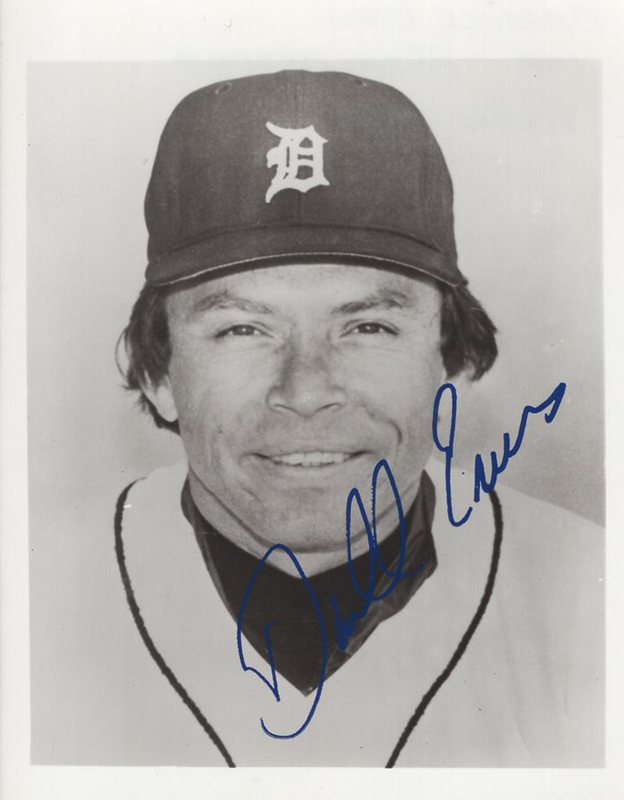
1984 card of Evans for Detroit Tigers

==== 1984 season and World Series ====
After the 1983 season, Evans entered the free agent market. He was selected by seventeen teams, more than any other player, in the November 1983 re-entry draft. The Los Angeles Dodgers, the New York Yankees and Detroit Tigers were the big pursuers, but only the latter offered a three-year deal. In December 1983, he became the first "big name" free agent to be signed by the Detroit Tigers. He signed a three-year contract worth approximately $2.25 million.

Playing for the World Series champion 1984 Detroit Tigers, Evans hit a three-run home run in his first regular season game in a Detroit uniform on the road against Minnesota. One week later, he hit another three-run home run with his first swing at Tiger Stadium. For the season, he appeared in 131 games, 62 as the designated hitter, 47 at first base, and 19 at third base. His .238 batting average was the lowest since 1976, but 77 walks (seventh in the American League) boosted his on-base percentage to .353. He also totaled 16 home runs and 63 RBIs for the 1984 Tigers. In the 1984 World Series, Evans managed only one hit in 15 at bats for a .067 batting average.

Evans' father died at the end of July 1984 after a long battle with cancer, and Evans missed several games to attend the funeral in California. He later recalled that it was the greatest disappointment of his life that his father was not able to see him play in the World Series.

==== 1985 season and home run title ====
Despite his noted leadership as an elder presence in the clubhouse, owner Tom Monaghan tried to trade Evans to New York in the off season due to his contract. However, this plot failed. In 1985, Evans had one of the best offensive seasons of his career. He appeared in 151 games, 113 at first base, 33 as the designated hitter, and seven at third base. At age 38, he led the major leagues with 40 home runs, while driving in 94 runs. He became the oldest player to register 40 home runs in American League history, a feat not topped until Nelson Cruz hit 41 homers for the Minnesota Twins in 2019 at age 38/39. Evans was also the oldest player to lead the American League in home runs, and the first player to hit 40 home runs in both the National and American Leagues. He also registered a .356 on-base percentage (as a result of drawing 85 walks), and his .519 slugging percentage was his best since his breakout season in 1973. He was selected by both Detroit sports writers and fans for the 1985 Tiger of the Year award.

==== 1986 to 1988 seasons ====
At the start of the 1986 season, Detroit manager Sparky Anderson announced that Evans would not be the Tigers' first baseman and would instead be the team's designated hitter. Evans publicly expressed his frustration at losing his spot in the lineup after hitting 40 home runs. In the end, Anderson relented, and Evans played 105 games at first base and 42 as the designated hitter for the 1986 Tigers. He hit 29 home runs (part of a Tigers infield in which all four players hit at least 20 homers) and had 85 RBIs while compiling a .356 on-base percentage.

Evans' three-year contract expired after the 1986 season, and the Tigers decided not to offer him a contract to avoid triggering Evans' arbitration rights. No other teams made offers to Evans, and in late February 1987, he signed a one-year contract with the Tigers; the contract cut his salary by $200,000 to between $500,000 and $550,000. During the 1987 season, Evans appeared in 150 games for the Tigers, including 105 at first base and 44 as the designated hitter. He drew 100 walks in 1987, fourth most in the American League, pumping his on-base percentage to .379, his highest since 1974. He also hit 34 home runs, had 99 RBIs (second most in his career), and finished 12th in the voting for the American League Most Valuable Player Award. In the 1987 American League Championship Series, he compiled a .294 batting average and .455 on-base percentage. However, he was also picked off at third base in the fourth game of the ALCS, "hammering the final nail" into the Tigers' defeat.

Evans returned to Detroit for one last season in 1988. He appeared in 144 games (72 at DH, 65 at 1B) and had 22 home runs, including his 400th career homer in September, but he saw his batting average drop precipitously to .208. At the end of the 1988 season, the Tigers announced that Evans, age 41, would not be offered a contract for the 1989 season. Evans appeared in 727 games in five years with the Tigers, hit 141 home runs, and compiled a .358 on-base percentage and .450 slugging percentage.

=== Swan song with the Braves ===
In December 1988, Evans signed to return to the Atlanta Braves for the 1989 season. He appeared in 109 games with the 1989 Braves, compiling a .207 batting average with 11 home runs. He appeared in his final major league game on October 1, 1989, at age 42. At the beginning of April 1990, the Braves released Evans, ending his playing career. At the time, Evans told the Associated Press: "It's happened to a lot of my friends and it's not easy. I guess when it slaps you in the face you don't know how to feel. I don't know what to expect because I've never been in this situation before." Evans appeared in 866 games in nine years with the Braves, hitting 131 home runs and compiling a .368 on-base percentage.

=== Career highlights ===
Evans played 21 seasons in the majors and appeared in 2,687 games. Evans compiled a .248 batting average (2,223-for-8,973) with 1,344 runs, 329 doubles, 36 triples, 414 home runs, 1,354 RBI, 98 stolen bases, 1,605 walks, 1,410 strikeouts, .361 on-base percentage and .431 slugging percentage. Defensively, he recorded a .973 fielding percentage.

Evans was the 22nd player in baseball history to total 400 home runs. He was also the first player to hit 40 home runs in a season in both leagues. He hit over 20 home runs in 10 different seasons, and he was only the second player in major league history (after Reggie Jackson) to hit at least 100 home runs with three different clubs. Evans hit 60 home runs after reaching age 40, at the time a major league record; he has since been surpassed by only Carlton Fisk. He had nineteen seasons with at least ten home runs..

Evans averaged 97 walks per 162 games, and drew 100 or more walks five times (1973–1975, 1978, and 1987). His career total of 1,605 walks ranked eighth in major league history at the time of his retirement and remains 12th most in major league history. For all players who primarily played third base up to the year of his retirement, Evans ranked as having the third most home runs for the position, the second most walks and the fifth most RBIs.

Evans has been described by author and pioneering sabremetrician Bill James as "the most underrated player in baseball history, absolutely number one on the list". In The Bill James Handbook 2019, James also rated Evans No. 7 on his list of "The 25 Best Players Who Are Not in the Hall of Fame."

== Managerial and coaching career ==
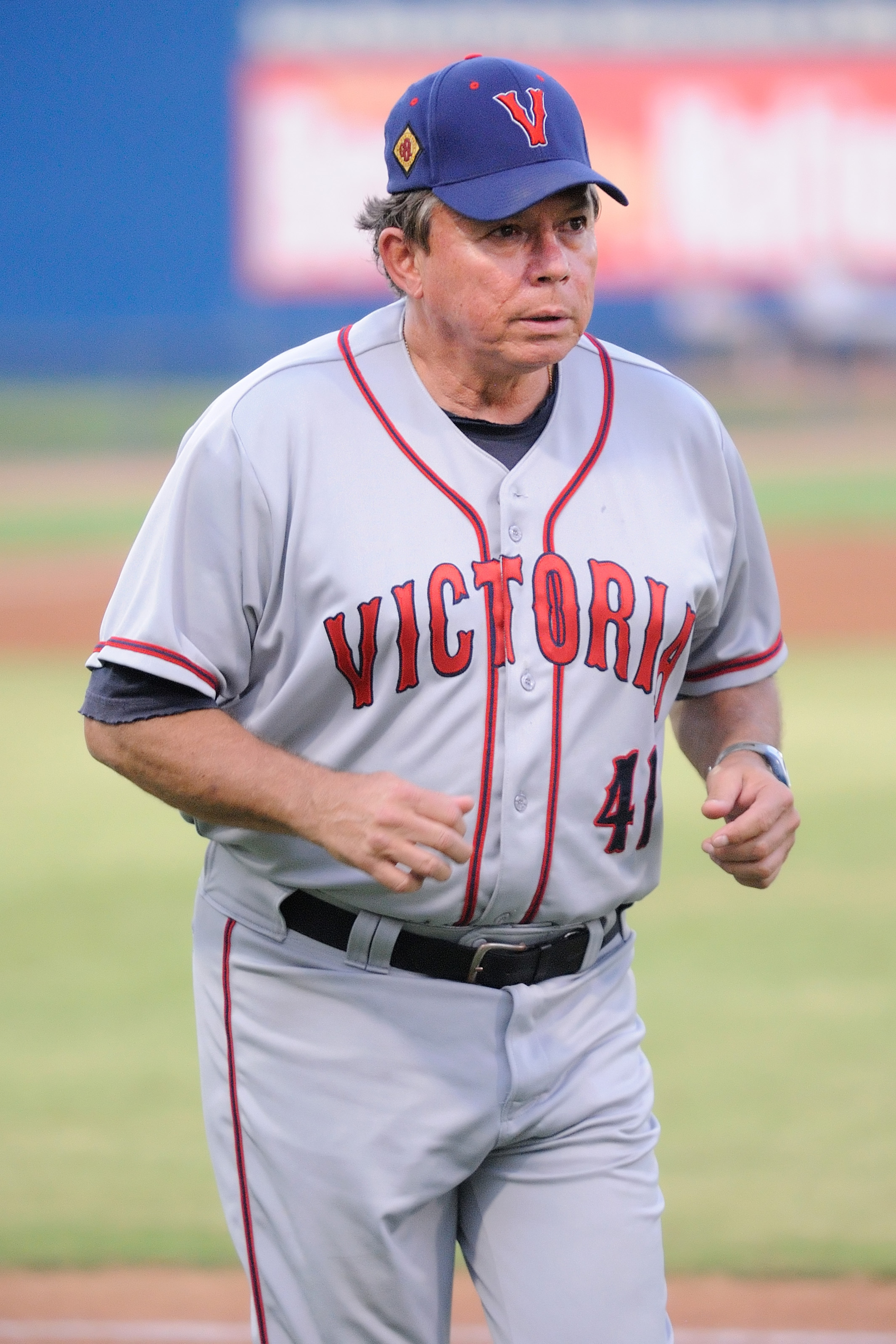
Evans as manager in Victoria

In June 1990, two months after his release by the Braves, Evans was hired by the New York Yankees as the team's hitting instructor, amid rumors that he may eventually be asked to take over Stump Merrill's job as manager. Evans was credited with making a change in rookie Kevin Maas' swing, allowing him to more effectively reach Yankee Stadium's short right field fence. At the end of the 1990 season, the Yankees named Graig Nettles as its hitting coach and announced that Evans would not return in 1991.

Evans later worked as a minor-league instructor. He was also the manager for several minor league teams, including stints with the Tyler Wildcatters of the independent Texas-Louisiana League in 1997, the Wilmington Blue Rocks of the South Atlantic League in 1998, the Huntsville Stars in the Double-A Southern League in 1999, the Aberdeen Arsenal of the independent Atlantic League in 2000, and the Allentown Ambassadors in the independent Northern League in 2002.

From 2005 to 2007, Evans was the manager of the Long Beach Armada in the independent Golden Baseball League. He led Armada to the GBL championship in 2007. He then served in 2008 as the bench and hitting coach for the Orange County Flyers, a team managed by Gary Carter. The Flyers beat Calgary for the 2008 GBL championship.

Evans was hired in November 2009 as the first manager and director of player personnel for the newly-organized Victoria Seals of the GBL. In March 2010, he was fired after the owner learned that Evans was seeking employment as a manager with another club. Evans also managed the Palm Springs Chill in 2009 in the California Winter League. After being fired by the Victoria club, Evans was hired in 2010 as the manager of the St. George RoadRunners in the GBL.

== Family and later years ==
Evans had four children. His oldest son, Derek Evans, was born during his first marriage. Then, Evans married Ladonna Martin-Evans and they had three children, Stacey Evans, Nicholas Evans, and Chad Evans. In 1984, Evans publicly revealed that, in the summer of 1982, he and his wife had seen an unidentified flying object from the porch of their home in Pleasanton, California. Evans described the UFO hovering over his neighbor's house as appearing "like a flying wing", triangular in shape with no wings and with green and red lights on the sides and white lights on the back.

In the mid-2000s, Evans worked as a consultant for Netamin Corporation in the development of its Ultimate Baseball Online multiplayer online game.

== See also ==
- List of Major League Baseball career runs batted in leaders
- List of Major League Baseball career home run leaders
- List of Major League Baseball career hits leaders
- List of Major League Baseball career runs scored leaders
- List of Major League Baseball career bases on balls leaders
- List of Major League Baseball annual home run leaders

Preceded by Terry Kennedy	National League Player of the Month; May, 1983	Succeeded by Andre Dawson
