= Coyote Lake (Santa Clara County, California) =

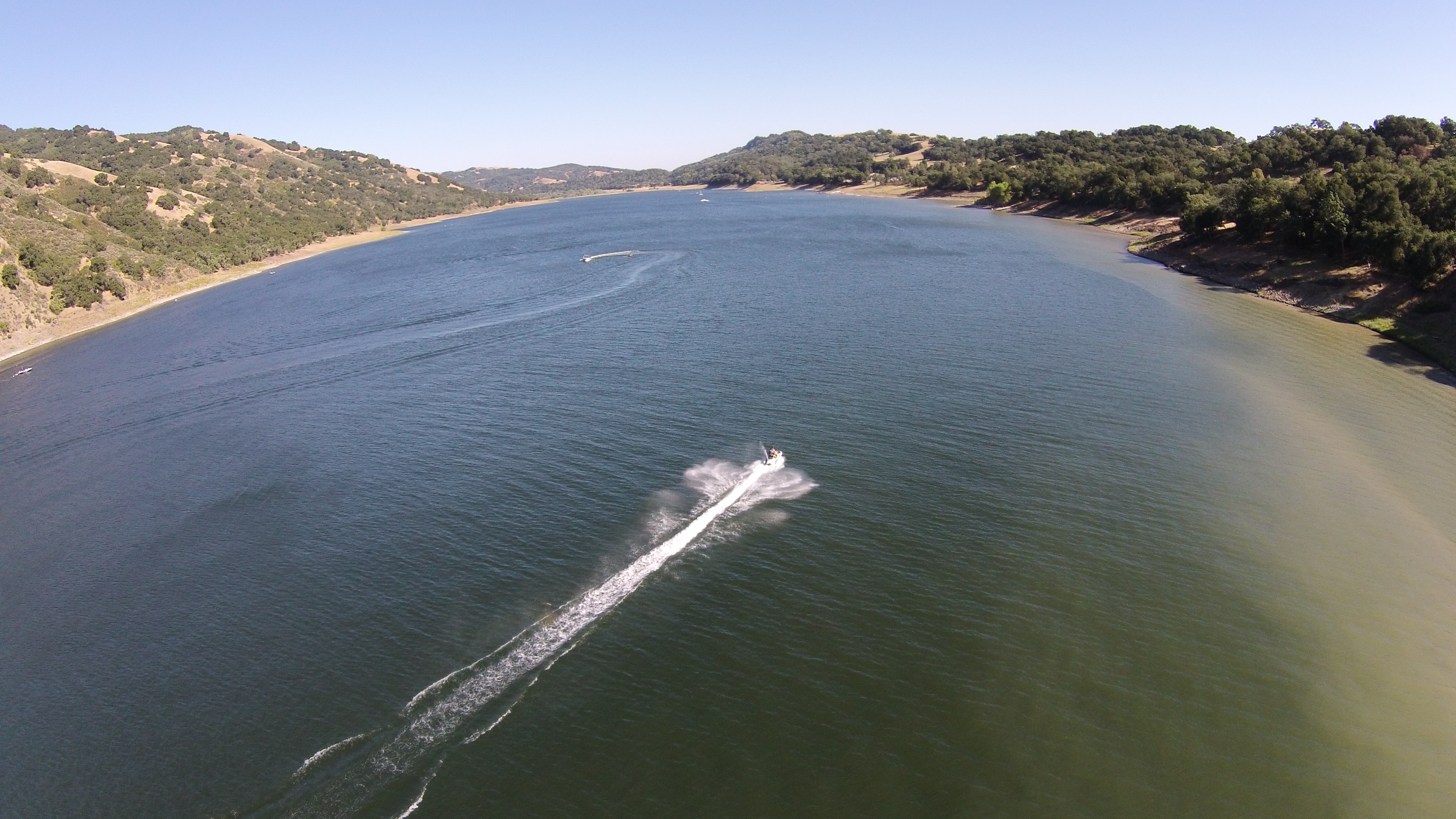
- Aerial view, May 2014

- Location within California Location within the United States
- Location: Santa Clara County, California
- Coordinates: 37°05′39″N 121°32′13″W
- Type: Reservoir
- Primary inflows: Coyote Creek
- Primary outflows: Coyote Creek
- Catchment area: 119.8 sq mi (310 km^{2})
- Basin countries: United States
- Managing agency: Santa Clara Valley Water District
- Max. length: 3.5 mi (6 km)
- Max. width: 0.5 mi (0.8 km)
- Surface area: 635 acres (2.6 km^{2})
- Water volume: 23,666 acre⋅ft (29,192,000 m^{3})
- Surface elevation: 774 feet (236 m)

Coyote Lake (also known as Coyote Reservoir) is an artificial lake in Santa Clara County, California, United States, between Morgan Hill and Gilroy.

The reservoir is impounded by Coyote Dam, a 140-foot (43 m) high, 980-foot (300 m) long, earth and rock dam built in 1936. It holds 23,244 acre feet (28,671,009 m3) of water when full. It is the second largest reservoir owned by the Santa Clara Valley Water District.

A 4,595-acre county park ("Coyote-Bear") surrounds the reservoir, and provides camping (RVs and tents), fishing ("catch-and-release"), picnicking, and hiking activities. Swimming is not allowed by order of the Santa Clara Valley Water District. Power boating, jetskiing, waterskiing, sailing, canoeing/kayaking and fishing are all allowed in the reservoir. The boat launch ramp is located two miles north of the visitor center. It has two docks, a three-lane concrete ramp, paved parking and a restroom. For fisherman, the lake contains bluegill, black crappie, channel catfish, carp and black bass. The reservoir is closed to all boating between mid-October and mid-April.

The California Office of Environmental Health Hazard Assessment has issued a safe eating advisory for any fish caught in the Coyote lake due to elevated levels of mercury.

== See also ==
- Coyote Lake (disambiguation) for other lakes of the same name
- List of lakes in California
- List of lakes in the San Francisco Bay Area
- List of reservoirs and dams in California
