= Dylan LeBlanc =

American singer-songwriter (born 1990)

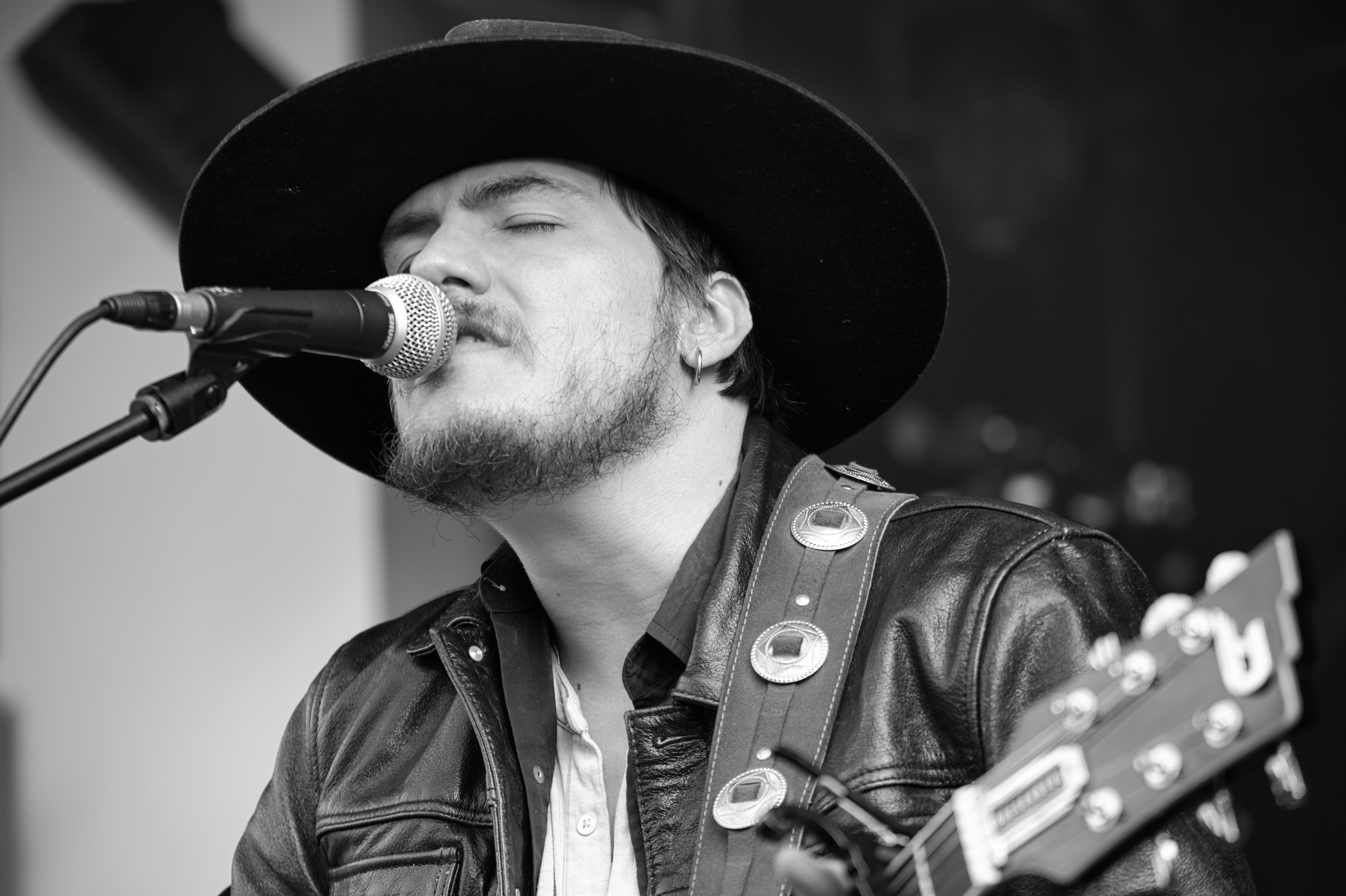
- LeBlanc performing at the Orange Blossom Special Festival, 2025

Background information
- Born: March 9, 1990 (age 36); Shreveport, Louisiana, US
- Genres: Alternative country; folk; Americana
- Occupation: Singer-songwriter
- Instruments: Vocals; acoustic guitar; electric guitar; mandolin
- Years active: 2009–present
- Labels: Rough Trade; Single Lock; ATO
- Website: dylanleblanc.com

Dylan LeBlanc (born March 9, 1990, in Shreveport, Louisiana) is an American singer-songwriter and guitarist. He has released five studio albums.

== Early life ==
Dylan LeBlanc is an American musician and artist. Born in Shreveport, Louisiana, LeBlanc began performing at age fifteen. In Shreveport and Muscle Shoals, Alabama, he began performing at local venues. From a young age, LeBlanc watched his father perform at various clubs and bars. He became intrigued with musicianship and the way of life. At the age of nineteen, after parting ways with the band Abraham, he acquired a vast amount of original material. Then, he was signed by Rough Trade Records who released his first album Pauper's Field.

At infancy LeBlanc's mother and father divorced. Until the age of nine, LeBlanc lived with his mother in Blanchard, Louisiana, a small town in the northwest corner of Shreveport. Working full-time cleaning houses, LeBlanc's mother raised Dylan and his two siblings. At the age of ten, LeBlanc relocated to Muscle Shoals so his father could pursue his musical career as a professional country music songwriter. In Muscle Shoals, LeBlanc acquired a unique musical education. He spent late nights watching musicians record at the studios where his father played on sessions for the songs that he wrote.

At the age of fourteen he moved back to Shreveport to live with his grandmother and began to attend high school at Captain Shreve High School. While there, LeBlanc met musician Daniel Goodwill and began playing music with an alternative rock band, Jimmy Sad Eyes Blue. Goodwill inspired LeBlanc to begin writing his own music. After a few years of playing with Jimmy Sad Eyes Blue, LeBlanc was forced to attend rehab. Following rehab, rather than returning to high school, LeBlanc decided to pursue a full-time music career.

LeBlanc joined the local Muscle Shoals Punk Rock band after the band lost its lead singer to the Sons of Roswell and the band toured throughout the southeast. A few years later, LeBlanc became a co-founder of the band Abraham. He made his first recordings with Abraham at Fame Recording Studios in Muscle Shoals. At that time, the studio's house engineer Ben Tanner (of Alabama Shakes) was a member of LeBlanc's band.

== Music career ==
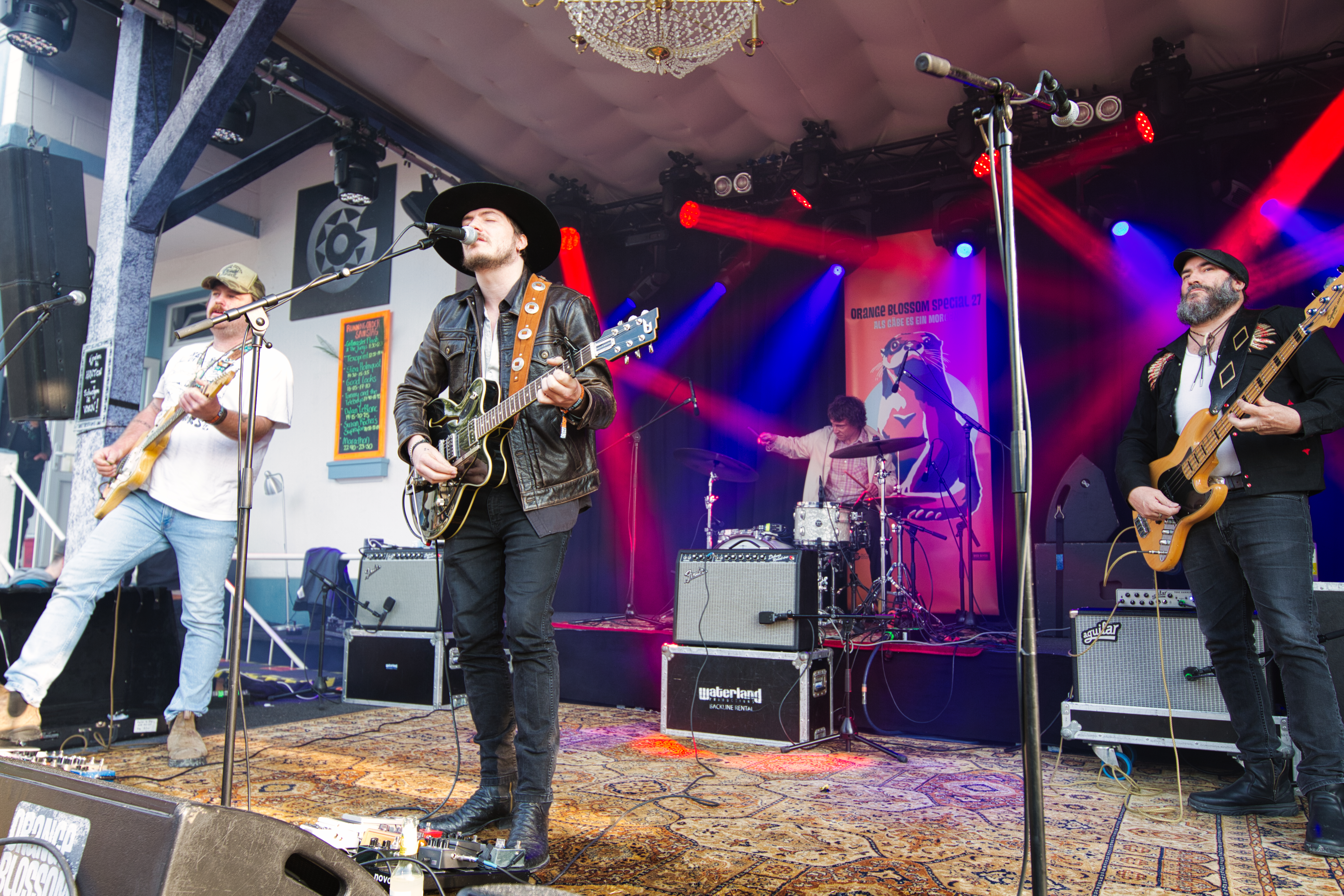
Dylan LeBlanc & Band at Orange Blossom Special Festival 2025

In early 2010, LeBlanc released his first album Paupers Field. The song "If the Creek Don't Rise" features Emmylou Harris. In support of the album, LeBlanc toured with and opened for acts such as Lucinda Williams, The Civil Wars, Laura Marling, George Ezra, and Calexico.

LeBlanc's second album, Cast the Same Old Shadow was released in August 2012. Following its release, LeBlanc played with Bruce Springsteen, First Aid Kit, The Drive By Truckers, and Alabama Shakes. The Guardian review of Cast the Same Old Shadow called its songs "as beautiful as they are bleak" and the album "eerie rather than unsettling".

Dylan LeBlanc's third studio album, Cautionary Tale, was released January 15, 2016, on Single Lock Records. His fourth studio album, Renegade, was released June 7, 2019, on ATO Records.

== Discography ==
=== Albums ===
- Paupers Field (2010)
- Cast the Same Old Shadow (2012)
- Cautionary Tale (2016)
- Renegade (2019)
- Coyote (2023)

=== Singles ===
- "Renegade" – No. 31 Adult Alternative Songs
