= Coyote Creek =

Coyote Creek may refer to:

== Streams ==
- Coyote Creek (Calaveras County), California
- Coyote Creek (Contra Costa County), California, a tributary of South San Ramon Creek
- Coyote Creek (Marin County), California
- Coyote Creek (Mora River tributary), New Mexico
- Coyote Creek (Oat Creek tributary), California
- Coyote Creek (Santa Clara County), California
- Coyote Creek (San Mateo County), California
- Coyote Creek (Yolo County), California
- Coyote Creek (Ventura County), California
- Coyote Creek (San Gabriel River), California
- Coyote Creek (Borrego Sink), California, perennial stream
- Coyote Creek (Long Tom River), Oregon

== Other ==
- Coyote Creek Trail, San Jose California - part of the National Recreation Trail system
- Coyote Creek bicycle path, Los Angeles County, California
- Coyote Creek Bridge, Lane County, Oregon
- Coyote Creek State Park, New Mexico
- Trails of Yellowstone National Park includes a Coyote Creek Trail

== See also ==
- Coyote Gulch (California), a stream or creek
