= Palm Springs Stadium =

Sports venue in Palm Springs, California

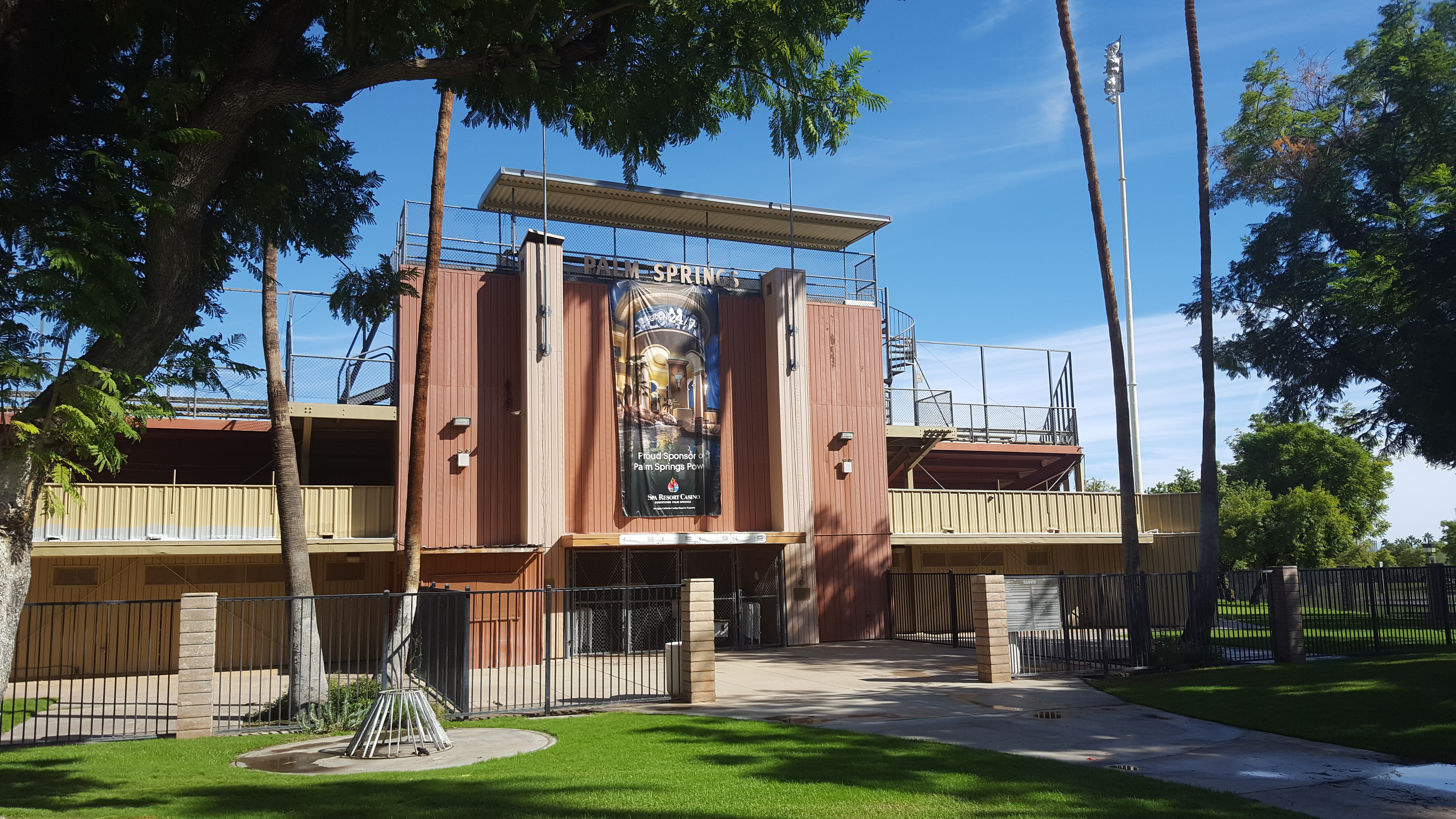
- Interactive map of Palm Springs Stadium
- Former names: Polo Grounds (1949–1961); Angels Stadium (1961–1995); Suns Stadium (1995)
- Location: 1901 E Baristo Road; Palm Springs, California 92262
- Coordinates: 33°49′6″N 116°31′33″W
- Capacity: 5,185
- Surface: Grass
- Field size: Left – 347 ft. Center – 385 ft. Right – 345 ft.

Construction
- Opened: 1949
- Architects: Harry J. Williams, E. Stewart Williams, H. Roger Williams
- Main contractors: Pittsburgh Des Moines Steel Co., H.H. Foster & Associates, Orlan R. Andrews Company

Palm Springs Stadium is a stadium in Palm Springs, California. It is primarily used for baseball. It used to be named Angels Stadium and was the home field of the Palm Springs Suns of the Western Baseball League in 1995 and 1996. Palm Springs Stadium is the home of the Palm Springs Power, a collegiate summer baseball team playing in the California Premier Collegiate League. The stadium is also the official home of the Power Summer Collegiate League and the California Winter League (2010). The stadium has a seating capacity of 5,185.

== History ==
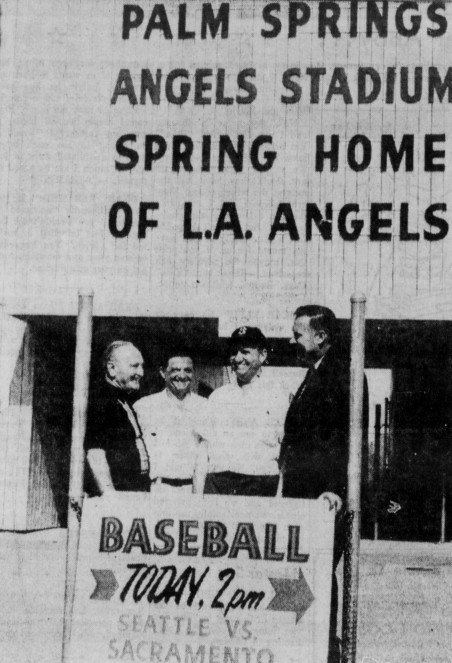
Palm Springs Stadium in Palm Springs, California in 1965, formerly the spring training home of the Los Angeles Angels of the Pacific Coast League (PCL). In the image from left to right are Angels general manager Fred Haney, trainer Freddie Frederico, owner Gene Autry and PCL president Dewey Soriano. The signboard the men are standing over is from 1955.

Formerly a polo ground, the present-day stands opened in 1949 and were expanded four times in the 1950s. They hosted exhibition games for several Pacific Coast League teams throughout the 1950s and 1960s. From 1961 to 1992, it hosted spring training for the California Angels under team owner Gene Autry, also a part-time resident. It also hosted the Chicago White Sox for spring training from 1951–53.

The class-A minor league affiliate of the Angels, the Palm Springs Angels of the California League, played "in the heat" from 1986 to their last season, 1993.

Four other teams played in the stadium, Palm Springs Promise an Independent Minor League Affiliate of Play Ball Inc operated in 1993–1994. The Cal League's Modesto A's played 20 home games that year, and the Riverside Pilots did the same in 1995 (the Pilots are now the Lancaster JetHawks). The Phoenix Firebirds of the AAA-level Pacific Coast League played 20 "home" games at the stadium in 1997 before they became the Tucson Sidewinders and their opponents were the Tucson Toros, who became the Fresno Grizzlies.

For a while, the only bond with the major leagues was softball. But the Pepsi All-Star softball game went to nearby Cathedral City in 1998 at the Field of Dreams complex. The Palm Springs Heat of the Western States Football League had lackluster games in the 1993 season with a 4–10 record before they folded operations. So has the 2007–09 Desert Valley Knights.

The status of Palm Springs Stadium was unclear in the late 1990s and early 2000s. The city council had refused to pay for renovation in the past, when Sonny Bono, then-mayor of Palm Springs, had shown little interest. As a result, baseball was lost, teams left, and locals debated whether baseball could survive in an area known for summer heat and more local interest in golf and tennis.

But the issue has largely been resolved. The City of Palm Springs repainted the entire stadium in May 2007, right before the start of Power Baseball's 2007 season. In addition, the Power have made additional capital improvements to the stadium and the field.

The stadium played an important role in times of discrimination and limited access to the major leagues: In the mid-century (1920s/30s, 40s and 50s, and ending in the 1960s or 70s), the stadium held some games of some all-Black/African-American, Latino/Mexican American (with visiting Mexican national baseball teams), White ethnic (i.e., Jewish religious organizations), women's (the "Pony League"), all-senior citizens and all-wheelchair/disabled teams or leagues were formed in this state as well.

== Present ==
It was a possible site of interest for the independent Golden Baseball League later became the North American League in 2010, before the league folded. However, the current tenant, the Palm Springs Power, draw in more fans and local media than previous baseball teams. In 2018 the Palm Springs Collegiate League has taken residence at the stadium. The Palm Springs Chill is the founder of the California Winter League (2010) who used to play in the Arizona Winter League, and their 5 opponents are the Canada A's, Coachella Valley Snowbirds, Palm Desert Coyotes, and Blythe Heat-later replaced by the Washington BlueSox.

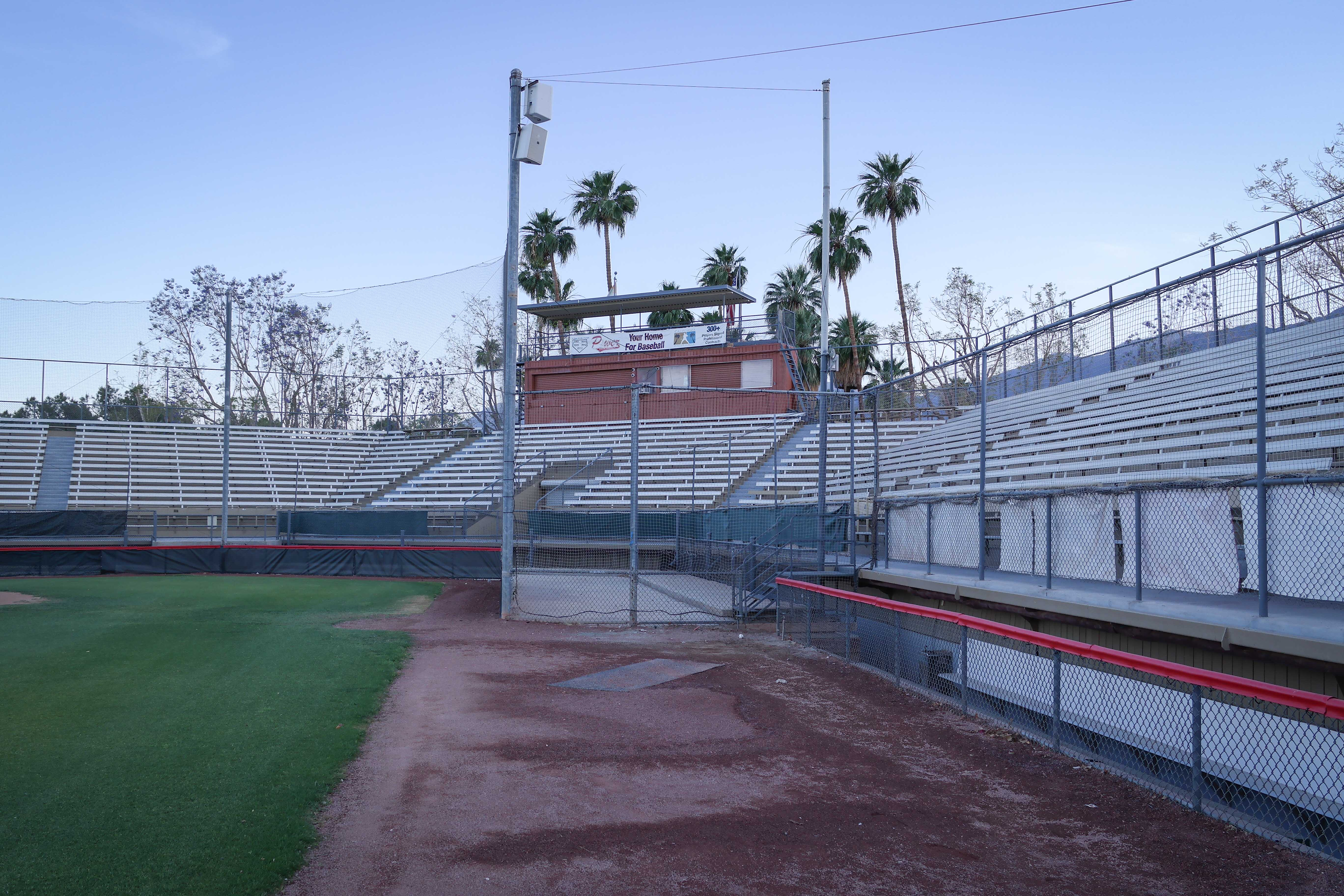
Palm Springs Stadium grandstand

The stadium is the site of the annual Palm Springs baseball tournament hosts invited 12 NCAA college baseball teams play in a month-long game series in the first week of March. Examples are the University of Oregon Ducks and the Oregon State Beavers. Since its first event in 2009 when it was 8 teams for a 4-day "weekend", the PSBT was a partial success in receiving fans to the stadium.

The stadium hosts all the games of the four team California Winter League in the 2010 season. The founding team, the Palm Springs Chill, began play in 2007/08 in the Arizona Winter League .

In addition to being the home stadium of Power and Chill baseball (who also have year round offices in the stadium), Palm Springs Stadium hosts an amateur football team, the Desert Valley Spartans, who are members of the LaBelle Community Football League (LCFL) and LCFL-West, from August to October, a springtime USABF Amateur Baseball tournament, pop-warner football, numerous local festivals, and softball tournaments throughout the year.

Palm Springs Stadium is used for community events and local sports/athletics, namely youth based programs (the AYSO or youth soccer tournaments, amateur teams of all ages such as softball, and veterans' amateur/semi-pro baseball leagues: the American Legion.

In the past, automobile exhibits or car shows, monster truck rallies and music concerts were also held in the stadium's field.

== Chronology ==
- 1950s
  - January 1950: World Class Rodeo inaugurates Polo Grounds Arena, build on an earlier recreation site used by locals.
  - 1950–1955: Pacific Coast League's Seattle Rainiers played at Polo Grounds, which had a ball diamond.
  - 1951 Chicago White Sox spend Spring Training at stadium, later the Cincinnati Reds in 1954–55 and Pittsburgh Pirates both of the National League in 1958–59 shared with Riverside, known to played the Los Angeles Dodgers in their new hometown of Southern California.
  - 1957–1959: Other Pacific Coast League and class D/AAA American Association teams use facilities most notably the Minneapolis Millers the affiliate of then-New York Giants (baseball). The PCL teams were the minor league Los Angeles Angels as a Chicago Cubs affiliate when they used Long Beach for spring training; the minor league San Diego Padres as a Boston Red Sox affiliate; the San Bernardino Pioneers under the Philadelphia Phillies whom used San Bernardino, California for spring training; and the Oakland Oaks, the San Francisco Seals, the Sacramento Solons, the Portland Beavers and Denver Bears switched leagues all made their appearances in Palm Springs.
- 1960s
  - 1960: Seattle Rainiers return to Palm Springs for 8 more years.
  - 1961: California Angels, owned by Gene Autry and Robert Reynolds, makes Palm Springs their spring training home.
  - April 1969: 250 law officers face 1,500 youths during Pop Music Festival riot.
- 1970s
  - 1970–79: The Seattle Pilots later the Milwaukee Brewers and Oakland A's both of the American League shared spring training site. They were popular in playing games against the 1969 expansion team San Diego Padres of the National League.
  - May 1975: Professional women's football all-star game is held there, the diamond is converted and used for American football play.
  - July 1976: America 200th bicentennial celebration held in stadium with fireworks display.
  - 1978–79: The California Sunshine soccer team based in Orange held exhibition games.
- 1980s
  - March 1983: Tommy John takes on Sutton at Angels preseason Game.
  - July 1983: Stadium Gets Lights Due to Funds Donated By Gene Autry.
  - 1980–91: California Angels hold an annual exhibition game series every April, an acknowledged thanks to the city and local fans.
  - 1984 preseason: The Angels soldout every game despite the stadium's small size, a new meaning to barnstorming by the major leagues.
  - October 1985: Stadium Site of the Big Circus and Halloween Carnival, a predecessor to the 1990–91 Annual Children's festival.
  - November 1985: Vintage Grand Prix Held at Stadium, later was the Palm Springs Grand Prix of the late 1980s/early 1990s.
- 1990s
  - January 1991: Darryl Strawberry and other Dodgers play in celebrity softball game held at stadium, sponsored by MTV.
  - June 1991: Power Jam Loads Stadium with Top-40 Bands for the Palm Springs Music Festival.
  - December 1991: Senior Olympics return for their fifth year, and a youth olympics event held in March 1992.
  - March 1992: Angels transfer to Tempe, Arizona after spring training ends.
  - August 1992: Kansas City Royals tryouts set in Palm Springs.
  - April 1993: PS Angels start play, their 7th (and last) season.
  - September 1993: PS Angels move to Lake Elsinore (now the Storm, a Padres affiliate) to play in 1994.
  - October 1993 Play Ball Inc. Signs multi year lease for PS Promise Baseball Club to begin single "A" Independent seasons attempting to join California League. Overall 69–19 record before city broke their agreement.
  - July 1994: Cincinnati Reds held a tryout camp for a 3-day weekend.
  - April 1995: Modesto A's hold 10 "home" games in stadium.
  - May 1995: PS Suns Start Play at Stadium, lasted two seasons before relocation to Oxnard (folded in 1999).
  - April 1996: Riverside Pilots of the California League hold 10 "home" games in the stadium.
  - June 1996: Angels Stadium renamed PS Stadium at request of PS Suns (also known for a clothing-optional fan attendance).
  - July 1997: Phoenix Firebirds and Tucson Toros of the Pacific Coast League each played 20 "home" games at the stadium.
  - January 1998: First Major League Baseball Exhibition game between the Colorado Rockies and Seattle Mariners.
- 1998 and 1999, the stadium was used by semi-pro LGBT leagues.
- 2000s
- 2000–03: Semi-pro LGBT league baseball.
  - June 2004: New hometown team, Palm Springs Power, opens. They made new attendance records in the early 2010s (2010 & 2011).
  - June 2005: PS Power starts second season – total season fan attendance over 100,000.
  - June 2006: PS Power starts third season – fan attendance climbs above 150,000.
  - June 2007: PS Power starts fourth season – fan attendance surpasses 200,000.
  - October 2007: First season of the Minor League Football Desert Valley Knights, also played in Cathedral City, California.
  - May 2008: PS Power's fifth season has total seasonal attendance of over 250,000 fans. The team is now a member of the Southern California Collegiate Baseball Association. The Power played some of their games in Palm Springs High School and briefly, Boone Field of Palm Desert.
  - December 2008: The Arizona Winter League grants a team in Palm Springs, the Palm Springs Chill.
  - January 2009: The Chill ends their first season with total fan attendance all season at above 100,000.
  - February 2009: The year's Second Major League Baseball Exhibition game of the L.A. Angels whom defeated the Los Angeles Dodgers as the first game the Los Angeles Angels of Anaheim were in Palm Springs since 1993.
  - March 2009: The first Palm Springs College Baseball Tournament.
  - May 2009: Hosts the 25th anniversary reunion of the North American Soccer League reunion of the folded league's best soccer players.
  - 2009: PS Power plays sixth season in 2009, with about 300,000 fans in attendance, as member of the Southern California Collegiate Baseball Association.
- 2010s
  - January 2010: The California Winter League premieres its first season, all their games representing four teams played in the stadium. The CWL championship was held on February 25, 2010.
  - February 2010: Another exhibition game for the Angels versus the San Diego Padres, another victory by the Angels in the stadium.
  - October 2010: Last season of the minor league football team Desert Valley Knights.
  - November 2010: The baseball field served as the home base of the 25th annual Palm Springs Pride (LGBT community pride) events.
  - January 2011: Third exhibition game of the Angels vs. the San Francisco Giants but the Angels lose.
  - October 2011: Last season of the minor league football Spartans team.
  - New Year's Eve-New Years Day (2011–2012): New Years' fireworks event.
  - January 2012: The site of the first all-Gay men's league in pro baseball enters their 3rd year: the 4–6 teams are the (Palm Springs) Gold, Good Times later merged with Happy Days, Makin Whoopee, (Alternative) Power, Rainbow Warriors, Working Men, and Youngins whom merged with the other teams.
  - February 2012: 50th anniversary game of the Los Angeles Angels of Anaheim whom defeated the Oakland A's.
    - Third CWL championship involving the crosstown rivals Palm Springs Power and the Palm Springs Chill. The more winning Chill finished 13–6 during the 2012 California Winter League season and were California Winter League runner up finishers, but have lost to the Palm Springs Power 7–5 in the Championship game in front of 2,500 fans at Palm Springs Stadium. As of 2017–18, the CWL is still active.
  - March 2012: The Palm Springs NAL team (possible name the POWER in caps) may play in the 40-game schedule season.
  - April 2012: Club Skirts Dinah Shore Weekend ("The Dinah") – home site of America's largest Lesbian social event, preceding the Kraft Nabisco Championship tournament, named for Dinah Shore the actress and former sponsor of the LPGA (Lady's Pro Golf) classic game series.
  - Summer 2012: The Palm Springs Power's 9th season, the longest in the SCBBA. Their first game vs. the Plano, Texas, Premiers.
  - In addition, the Padres' AAA-level team the Tucson Padres (formerly the Portland Beavers in 2010) used Palm Springs to host 10 "home" games in the 2012 season.
  - June 2012: The Southwest Cup, an amateur Native American tribal team soccer tournament was held there.
  - Summer 2013: The Palm Springs Power's tenth anniversary season.
  - As of 2017, The PS Power are in the California Collegiate League after they were in the SCBBA and previously, the Pacific Southwest Baseball League (2000s).
  - Summer 2018: The Palm Springs Collegiate League (6 teams) play their home games in the stadium and in nearby Palm Springs High School baseball field.
  - As of 2019, the PS Power are still active.
- 2020s
  - 2020: 100 years of stadium, local baseball and polo ground history.

== Gallery ==
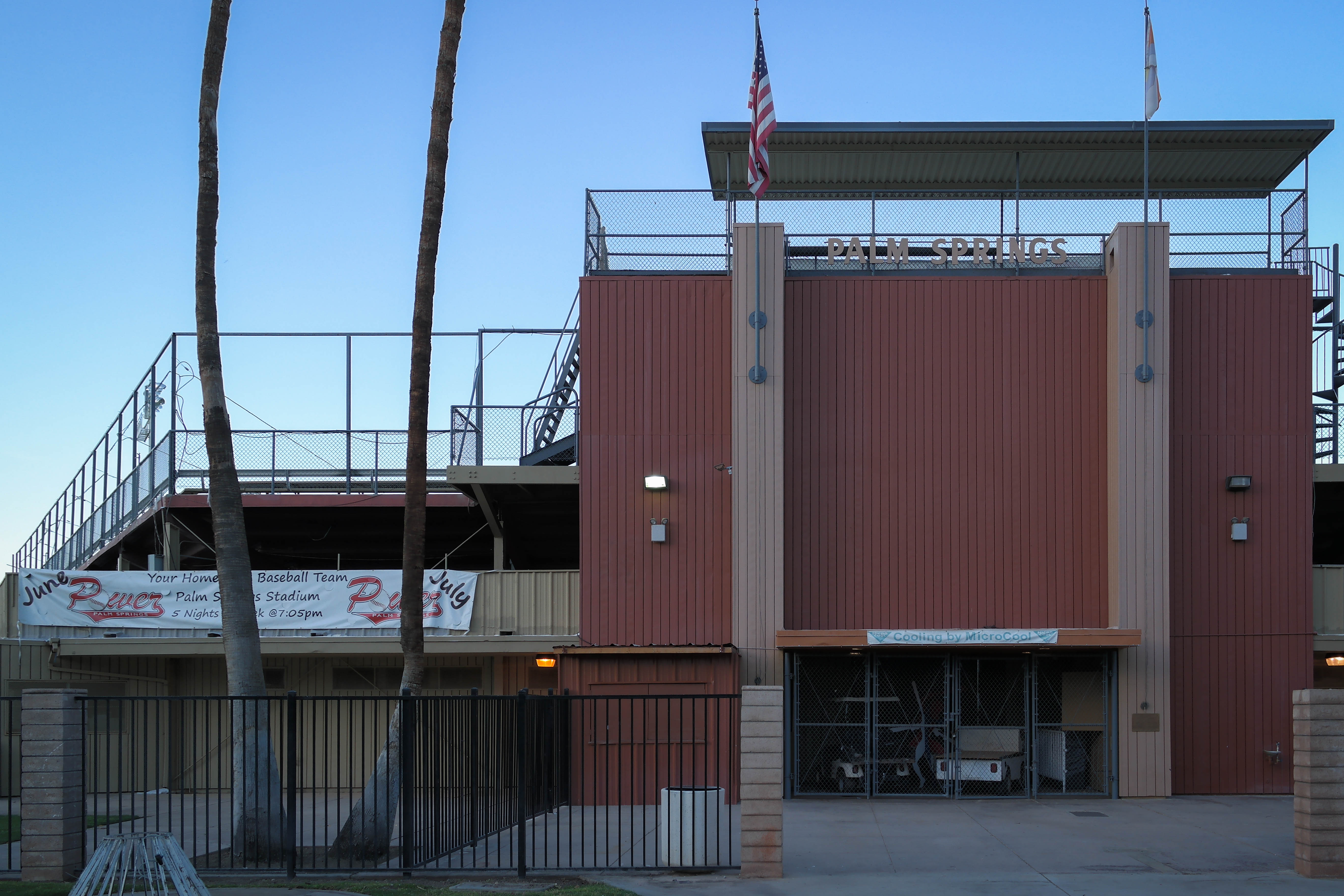
Palm Springs Stadium main entrance

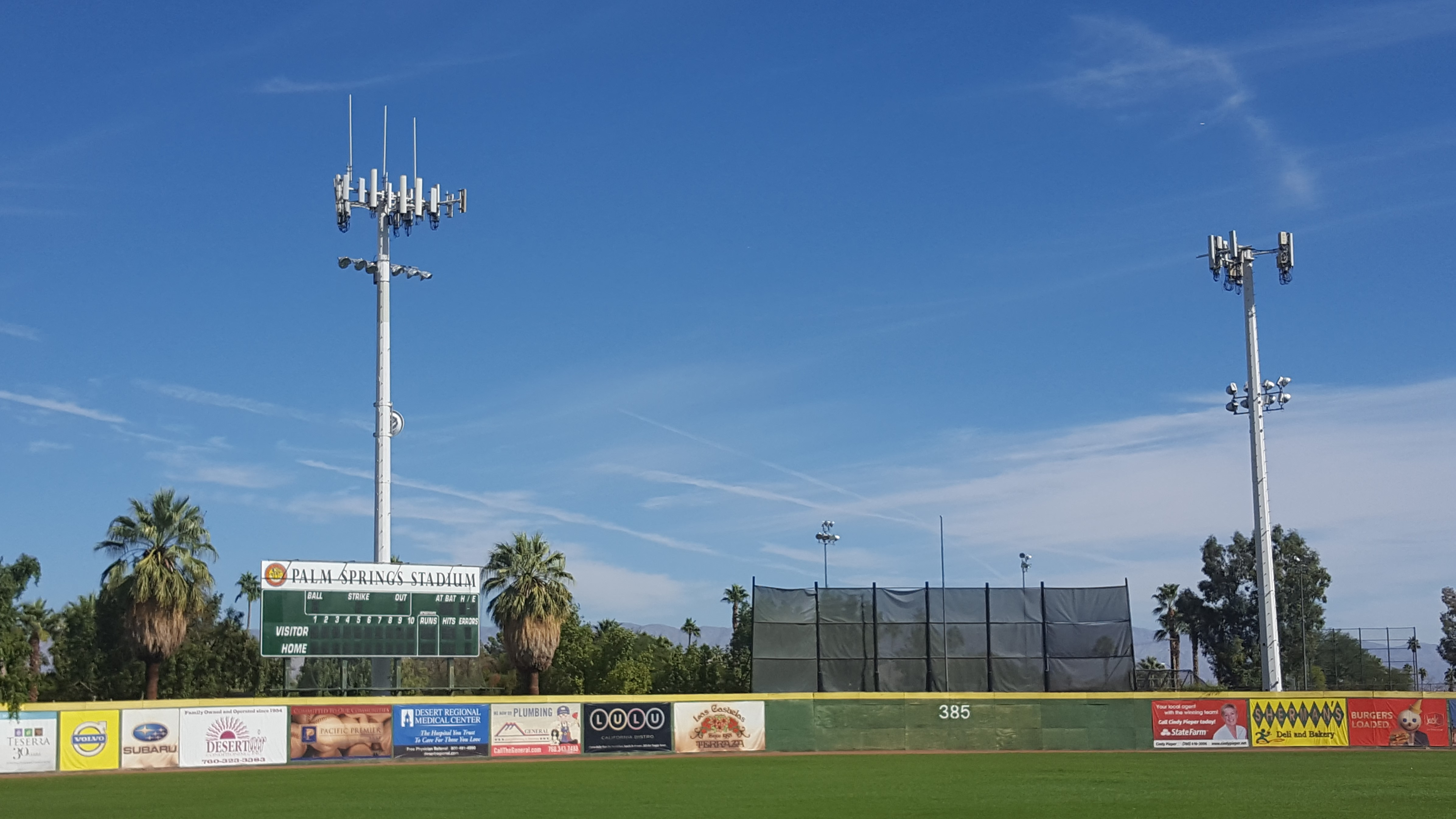
Palm Springs Stadium scoreboard
