= Coyote Creek (Oat Creek tributary) =

Stream in Tehama County, California, U.S.

Coordinates: 40.0788°N 122.1370°W

Coyote Creek is a stream in Tehama County, in the U.S. state of California. The stream runs for 18 miles (29 km) before it empties into Oat Creek.

According to tradition, Coyote Creek was named for a single coyote which was considered a nuisance by ranchers before it could be shot.
