= Coyote Lake =

Coyote Lake may refer to:

- Coyote Lake (San Bernardino County, California)
- Coyote Lake (Santa Clara County, California)
- Coyote Lake (near Dogtooth Peak in Fresno County, California)
- Coyote Lake (near Sharktooth Peak in Fresno County, California)
- Coyote Lake (Inyo County, California)
- Coyote Lake (near Sun Fair in San Bernardino County, California)
- Coyote Lake (Tulare County, California)
- Coyote Lake (Tuolumne County, California)
- Coyote Lake (Teton County, Wyoming), in Grand Teton National Park
- Coyote Lake (Alaska)
- Coyote Lake (film), a 2019 thriller drama film
