= Coyote (Dylan LeBlanc album) =

Studio album by Dylan LeBlanc
- Released: October 20, 2023
- Length: 52:54
- Label: ATO
- Producer: Dylan LeBlanc

Dylan LeBlanc chronology
Renegade (2019)	Coyote (2023)

Singles from Coyote
- 1. "No Promises Broken" Released: August 29, 2023; 2. "Coyote" Released: September 27, 2023; 3. "The Crowd Goes Wild" Released: October 17, 2023

Coyote is the fifth studio album by American singer-songwriter and guitarist Dylan LeBlanc. It was released on October 20, 2023, through ATO Records, as his first studio release in four years. The album received acclaim from critics.

== Background ==
On Coyote, LeBlanc takes on an adventure with Coyote, "a demon-haunted man on the run". Partly autobiographical and a concept album, the album tells the story of a man who lives a dangerous life and is always on the edge. Coyote finds himself caught up in the criminal underworld of Mexico and struggles to find a way out. But just as he does, Coyote gets haunted by his past and a wasted life. Finally greeted by "redemption and freedom", he has to face the "essence of human nature, materialism" and a craving for more.

== Critical reception ==
Professional ratings
Aggregate scores
Source	Rating
Metacritic	84/100
Review scores
Source	Rating
American Songwriter	4/5 stars
Far Out	3.5/5 stars
Mojo	4/5 stars
PopMatters	8/10
Uncut	4/5 stars

At Metacritic, which assigns a normalized rating out of 100 to reviews from professional critics, the album received an average score of 84 based on five reviews, indicating "universal acclaim". According to Steve Horowitz of PopMatters, LeBlanc understood what it takes "to live in the modern world" by depicting "what exists" rather "than judging it". American Songwriter's Lee Zimmerman called it his "most ambitious effort yet", showcasing a project "filled with suspenseful circumstance".

Tim Coffman at Far Out saw the album as a throwback "to the days of the old-school outlaws" with LeBlanc "willing to expand on" what the likes of "[Johnny] Cash and [Willie] Nelson" did. While Coffman opines that he runs "empty on some of this album", he is not willing "to give up on that dream".

== Track listing ==
All tracks are written by Dylan LeBlanc.

Coyote track listing
No.	Title	Length
1.	"Coyote"	4:05
2.	"Closin' In"	3:11
3.	"Dark Waters"	4:31
4.	"Dust"	4:14
5.	"Forgotten Things"	3:57
6.	"No Promises Broken"	3:49
7.	"Stranger Things"	3:48
8.	"Hate"	4:20
9.	"Wicked Kind"	5:08
10.	"Telluride"	4:03
11.	"Human Kind"	4:57
12.	"The Crowd Goes Wild"	3:34
13.	"The Outside"	3:17
Total length:		52:54
