= Coyote Mountain =

Coyote Mountain may refer to the following mountains in the United States:

- Coyote Mountain (Nevada), Humboldt County, Nevada
- Coyote Mountain (New Mexico), Sierra County, New Mexico
- Coyote Mountain (Jefferson County, Oregon), Jefferson County, Oregon
- Coyote Mountain (Lane County, Oregon), Lane County, Oregon
- Coyote Mountain (Wheeler County, Oregon), Wheeler County, Oregon
- Coyote Mountain (Ferry County, Washington), Ferry County, Washington
- Coyote Mountain (Lewis County, Washington), Lewis County, Washington
