= Coyote Dam (Santa Clara County, California) =

Dam in Santa Clara County, California, US

Coordinates: 37.118°N 121.55°W

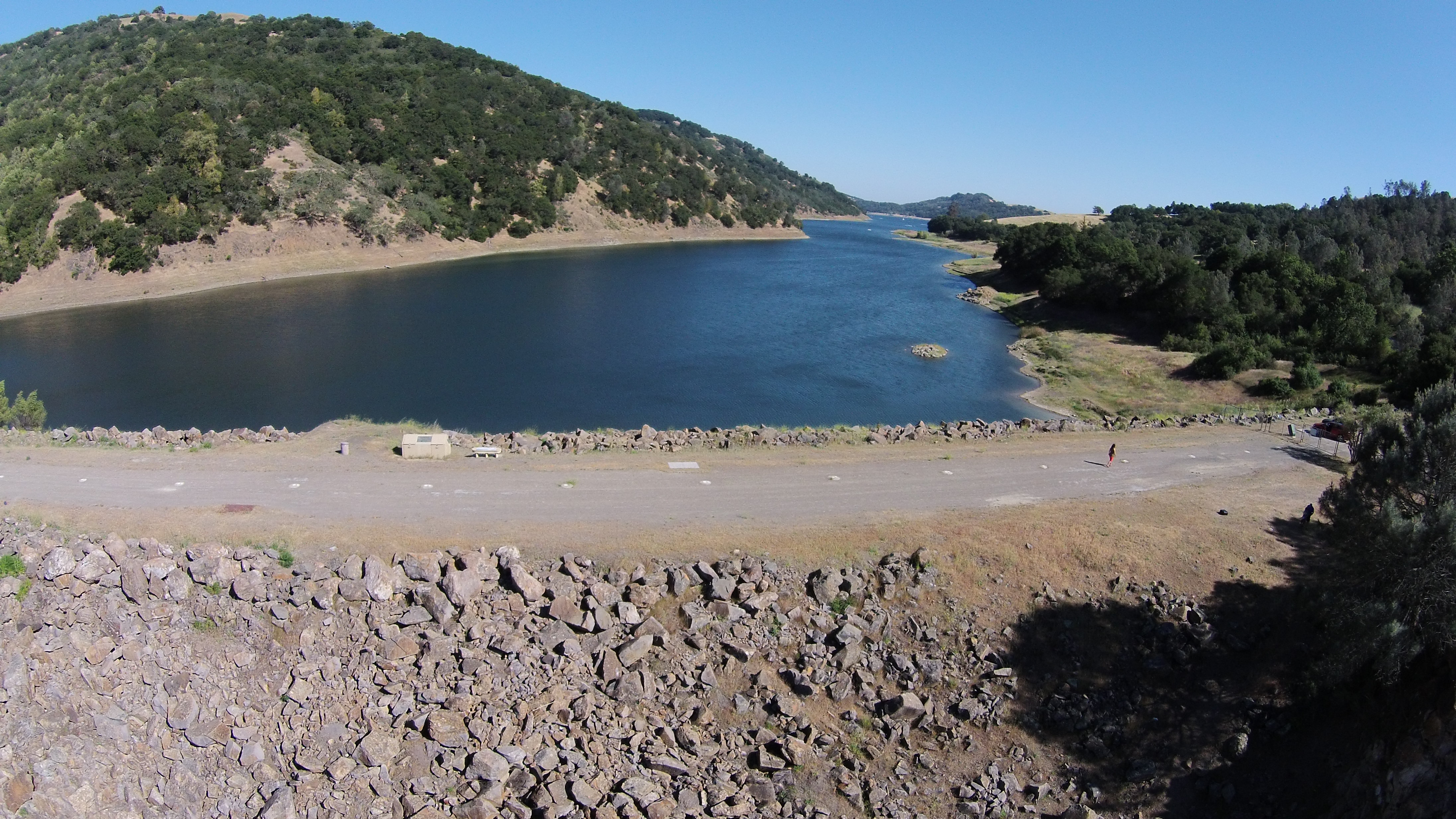
Aerial view of Coyote Dam

Coyote Dam is a 140-foot (43 m) high, 980-foot (300 m) long, earth and rock dam in Santa Clara County, California, United States, located north of Gilroy. A Public Works Administration project, it began in 1934 and was finished in 1936 (90 years ago).

It impounds the 635-acre (257 ha) 3.5-mile (5.6 km) long Coyote Lake (also known as Coyote Reservoir). The Santa Clara Valley Water District owns the dam.

== See also ==
- Coyote Lake
- List of dams and reservoirs in California
- List of lakes in the San Francisco Bay Area
