= Palm Springs Power =

Baseball team in California

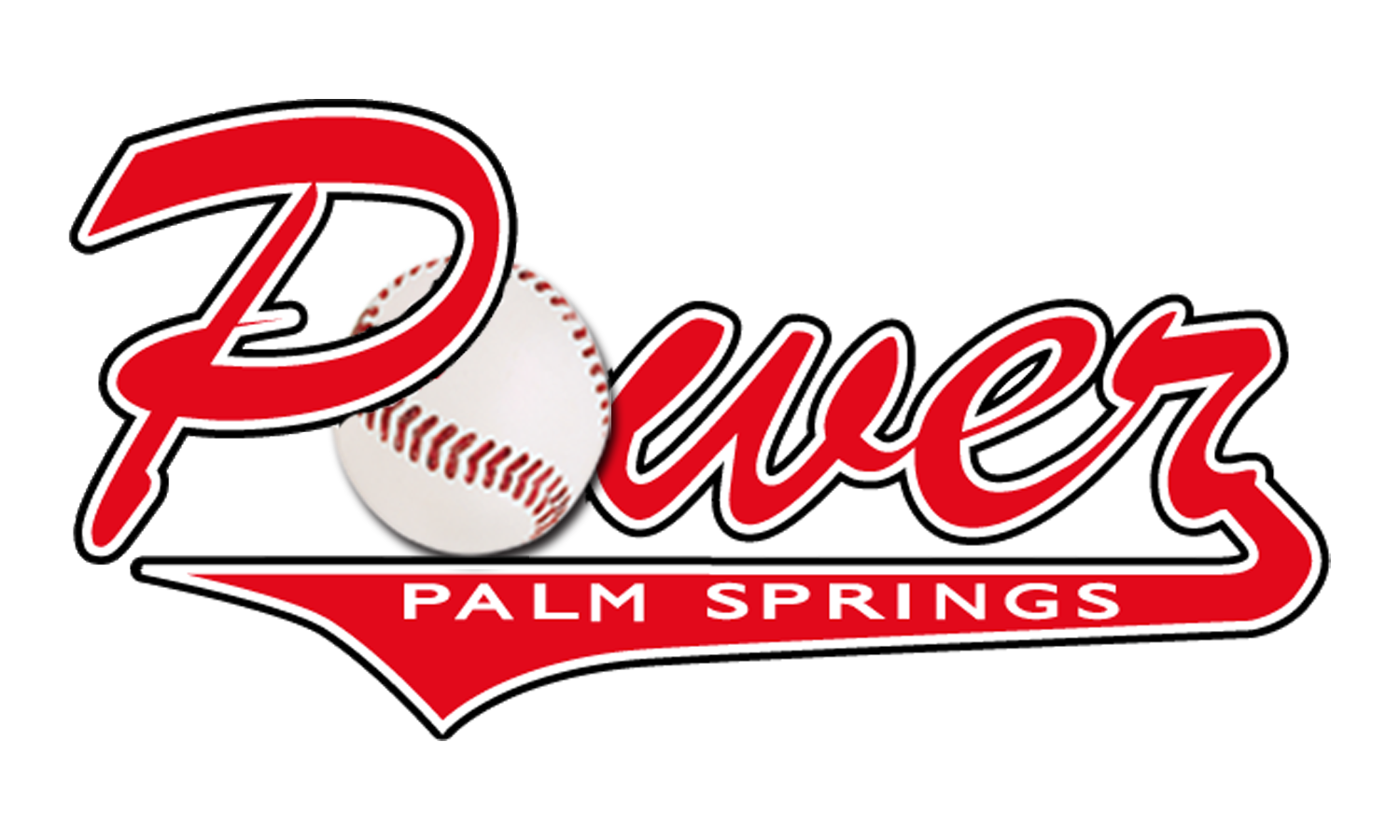

Information
- League: California Premier Collegiate League (2023–present)
- Location: Palm Springs, California
- Ballpark: Palm Springs Stadium
- Founded: 2003
- League championships: 10 (Southern California Collegiate Baseball League: 2009, 2011, 2012, 2013, 2014, 2015, 2017, 2019) (California Premier Collegiate League: 2023, 2024)
- Former league(s): Pacific Southwest League (2004–2006) Southern California Collegiate Baseball League (2007–2019); Independent (2021–2022)
- Colors: Red, White
- Mascot: Rocky the Ram
- Ownership: Andrew Starke
- Manager: Casey Dill
- Media: The Desert Sun
- Website: palmspringspowerbaseball.com

The Palm Springs Power are a summer collegiate baseball team playing at Palm Springs Stadium in Palm Springs, California. The Power debuted in 2004 and currently play in the California Premier Collegiate League.

== History ==
The Power were founded by Andrew Starke in 2003 and started playing games during the summer of 2004 at Palm Springs Stadium. The Power went 34–23 in their debut season and played in the National Baseball Congress World Series.

The Power played in the NBC World Series again in 2006. The team holds a winning record in all 20 seasons of playing baseball as of 2024 with ten outright league championships. Palm Springs were affiliated with the Pacific Southwest League from 2004 to 2006. The Power were then members of the Southern California Collegiate League from 2007 to 2019 winning eight league crowns.

As of the end of the 2024 season the Power's all-time organization record is 678–153. Their winning percentage of .816% is one of the best for any summer collegiate baseball team in the country.

== Present ==
Casey Dill has been the Power's Manager since 2017. The Power joined the California Premier Collegiate League in 2023 and won the league's inaugural championship before winning their second consecutive title in 2024.

== MLB alumni ==
Numerous former Power players have played in Major League Baseball.

- Sawyer Gipson-Long played for the Power in 2017
- Tyler Wells played for the Power in 2015
- Brian Serven played for the Power in 2015
- Luke Barker played for the Power in 2015
- Brooks Kriske played for the Power in 2014
- Brett Sullivan played for the Power in 2013
- Aaron Brooks played for the Power in 2009 and 2010
- Bryan Shaw played for the Power in 2006
