= California Winter League (2010) =

Instructional baseball league

- Sport: Baseball
- Founded: September 2009
- No. of teams: 10
- Country: United States
- Most recent champion: Washington Blue Sox
- Website: www.californiawinterleague.com

The California Winter League is an instructional showcase league for free agent baseball players who are looking to earn a professional contract before spring training begins. The league was created by Andrew Starke in 2010, and takes place in Palm Springs, California, at the Palm Springs Stadium complex which is a former spring training facility of the Los Angeles Angels.

== Instructors ==
Each season, the California Winter League hires current MLB pro scouts and professional independent league managers to act as instructors during the CWL season. These instructors manage games, work to develop CWL players, and sign CWL players during their time at the CWL. Every year, roughly 40% of CWL players receive a professional contract offer. The league has a partnership agreement with the Frontier League for scouting and player development.

== Purpose ==
The purpose of the California Winter League is to provide coaching and an avenue for players to get noticed by scouts with the ultimate goal of signing a professional contract. Past players have signed with various Independent baseball leagues

== Broadcast ==
As of the 2026 season, stadium games are broadcast for free on the Bally Sports Live App.
